= Teknaf (disambiguation) =

Teknaf is the southernmost town in Bangladesh. It may also refer to:

- Teknaf Upazila, a upazila in Cox's Bazar district
  - Teknaf Sadar Union, a union in Cox's Bazar district
- Teknaf Beach, a beach in Bay of Bengal
- Teknaf Wildlife Sanctuary, a reserve forest in Bangladesh
- Teknaf Land Port, a landport in Bangladesh
