= Teknaf Wildlife Sanctuary =

Wildlife sanctuary in Bangladesh

- টেকনাফ বন্যপ্রানী অভয়ারণ্য
- IUCN category IV (habitat/species management area)
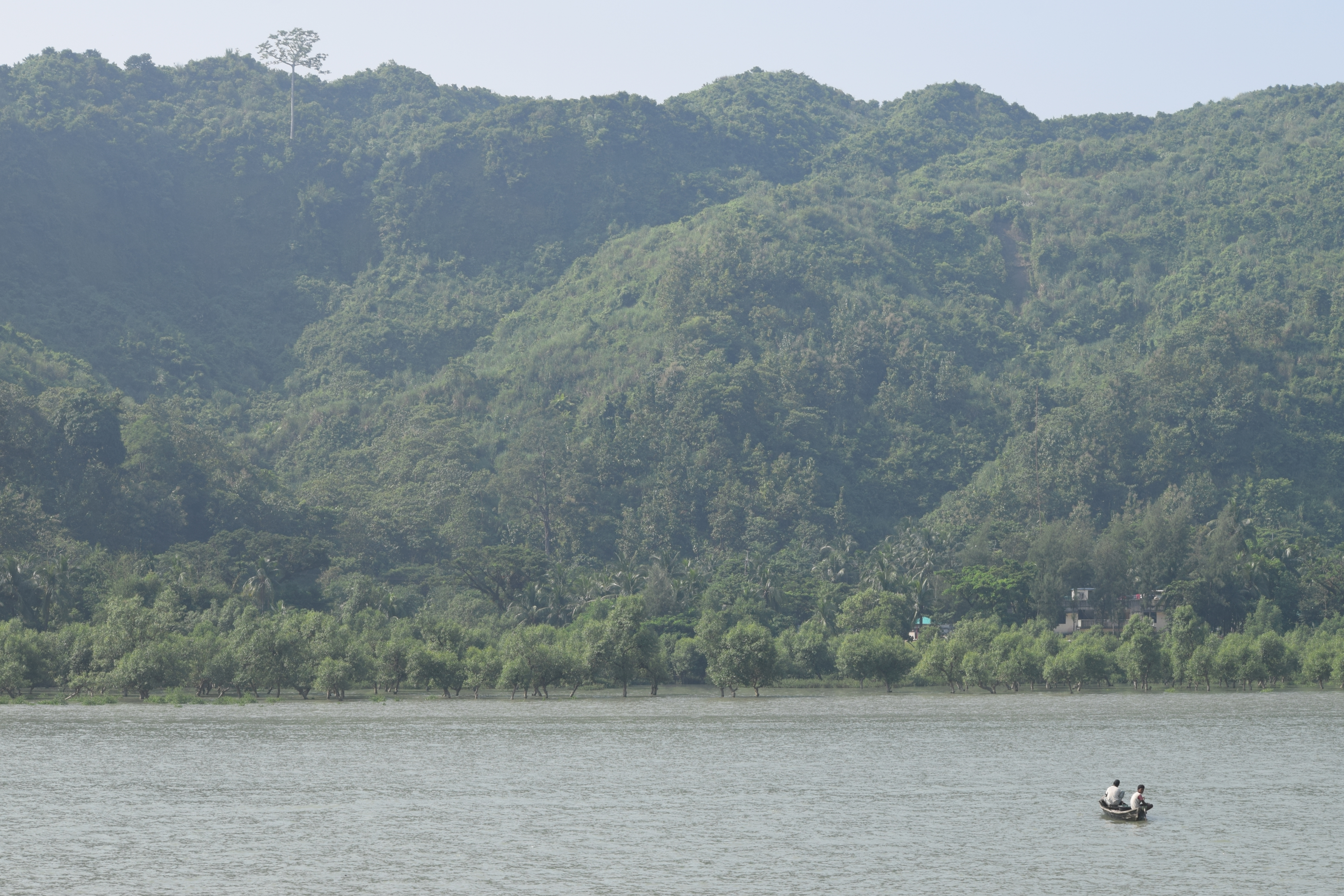

- Location within Bangladesh
- Location: Teknaf, Cox's Bazar District, Bangladesh
- Nearest city: Teknaf
- Coordinates: 21°04′00″N 92°09′00″E
- Area: 11,615 ha (28,700 acres)
- Established: 1983

Teknaf Wildlife Sanctuary is a protected area in the Cox's Bazar District of southern Bangladesh comprising a hill forest area of 11,615 ha (44.85 sq mi). In the east it is bordered by the Naf River, and in the west by the Bay of Bengal. It was established in 1983. It was once called Teknaf Game Reserve and is the only game reserve forest in the country. This is one of the few places in Bangladesh where Asian elephants can be seen in the wild. This vast sub-tropical forest has several other attractions like Nitong Hill, Kudum Cave, Kuthi Hill etc. The popular Toinga peak has an elevation of about 1000 feet. This sanctuary is rich in biodiversity.

The Teknaf Wildlife Sanctuary was declared a game reserve in 1983 under the Bangladesh Wildlife (Preservation) (Amendment) Act, 1974. The climate is humid tropical monsoon. The area receives strong winds from the southwest in the summer and gentler northeastern winds in the winter. It encompasses three biological series, Surma Series, Tipam Series and Dupi Series.

== Location and area ==
Teknaf Wildlife Sanctuary is situated in Teknaf peninsula at the south-eastern corner of Bangladesh. It spreads in 5 unions of Teknaf upazila of Cox's Bazar district; these unions are: Baharchhara Union, Nhila Union, Sabrang Union, Teknaf Sadar Union and Whykong Union.

== See also ==
- Lower Gangetic Plains moist deciduous forests ecoregion
- Sangu Matamuhari
