= Dhumdumia =

Damdamia
- Village
- Location in Bangladesh
- Coordinates: 20.9322°N 92.2631°E
- Country: Bangladesh
- Division: Chittagong Division
- District: Cox's Bazar District
- Upazila: Teknaf Upazila

Dhumdumia, also spelled Damdamia, is a village in Cox's Bazar District, Bangladesh. It is part of Teknaf Upazila and is located next to the village of Jadipara.
