= Ilias Kobra =

Bangladeshi film actor (born 1961)

Elias Kobra
- Born: 20 January 1961 (age 65); Baharchhara, Teknaf, Cox’s Bazar, Bangladesh
- Occupation: Actor
- Years active: 1987–present

Mohammad Ilias (Popularly known as Ilias Kobra) (born 20 January 1961) is a Bangladeshi film actor. He usually plays supporting negative roles in films. He made his acting debut in the 1987 film Maruk Shah, directed by Masud Parvez. In a career spanning more than two decades, Elias Cobra has acted in more than 500 films. During the 1990s, he became popular for playing negative roles in martial arts action films opposite many leading actors, including Rubel and Ratan Talukdar. Besides acting, he produced film Bhaiya Number One. He also served as the Sports and Cultural Secretary of Bangladesh Film Artists' Association (BFAA). He is the current vice-president of the organization.

== Birth & Personal life ==
He was born as Mohammad Elias on 20 January 1961 in Noakhaliyapara, Baharchhara Union, Teknaf, Cox's Bazar. Before joining the film industry, he was a martial arts instructor. He ran martial arts training centers in Teknaf, Cox's Bazar and Dhaka.

== Career ==
Elias Kobra made his acting debut in Sohel Rana's film Maruk Shah in 1986. Danny Sidak also played a villain with him at the time. Before coming to the movies, Elias Cobra ran a martial arts school. He has mostly worked in martial arts movies. He came from Burma (now Myanmar) to learn martial arts. He has acted in many films as a worthy rival to the kung fu hero Rubel, and has also appeared alongside Ratan Talukder in films such as Bojro Musthi (1989) and Lompot (1996). So far, he has acted in more than five hundred movies.

He won the 2000 Shilpi Samiti election for the post of Sports-Cultural Secretary.

== Selected movies ==
Year	Film
1996	Maruk Shah
1997	Shant Ken Mastan
1997	Bhand
1999	Mugher Mulluk
2000	Lund Bhand
2001	Chairman
2002	Major Saheb
2005	City Terror
2006	Bullet
2006	Chachchu
2007	Priya Amar Priya
2009	Thekao Andolan
2010	Hai Prem Hai Bhalobasha
2010	Search – The Search
2011	Wanted
2011	Boss Number One
2015	Dui Prithibi
2016	Musafir

== Ilias Kobra Market ==
On both sides of the paved road in Baharchhara, there is a market named Elias Kobra Market, with 45 shops. The market sells daily household goods as well as locally produced fish, vegetables, betel leaves, coconuts and seasonal fruits. The market was established in 2015.

== Criticism ==
He has been criticized for acting in several obscene movies
