= Jasmin Akter =

Cricketer and one of BBC's 100 Women 2019

- Born: 2001 (age 24–25); Nayapara refugee camp, Bangladesh
- Education: Bradford College
- Occupation: Cricketer
- Organization: Yorkshire County Cricket Club
- Known for: Captain of England's Street Child World Cup team
- Awards: BBC 100 Women 2019

Jasmin Akter (born 2001) is a Rohingya cricketer who was born in Nayapara refugee camp in Bangladesh. She came to live in Bradford, United Kingdom, as a refugee, was a child carer for her mother, and started an all-Asian girls cricket team. She represented England in the first Street Child Cricket World Cup Charity match. She was named one of the BBC's 100 most inspiring and influential women in 2019.

== Background ==
Jasmin Akter was born in 2001, in Nayapara refugee camp in Bangladesh, one of the camps where in total more than a million of the Rohingya people had been forced to flee after facing genocide and brutal persecution in Myanmar. Her father died just after she was born, and her mother had four other children, all living in poverty, so Akter had no education for almost ten years, but they eventually came via UNHRC programme to settle in the UK as refugees.

Akter was only 8 years old when they moved to Bradford, West Yorkshire but then in 2014, her mother and younger brother were seriously injured, in a car accident when visiting Bangladesh. Her mother was paralysed, with no health insurance in hospital in Bangladesh for three months. Eventually they got assisted travel back to the UK, but her mother was in and out of hospital for another two years, and needed constant care.

Akter became a child-carer at the age of 13 for her mother, and her three siblings. She had been at Bradford Football Club but had to give that up and forego a full scholarship to the USA.

== Cricket career ==
With the help of an after school club coach, she still found another route into sport as a means of release and thus her talent for cricket was discovered. Akter's skills were quickly recognised, she was made captain and tried for the county team, Yorkshire County, despite being teased for being a girl in a traditionally male sport.

She has said 'Sport is something that I feel I'm born to do. It's something that I'm really confident in and shows who I am.'' Akter also coached the younger children locally and was spotted by the charity Centrepoint who support young homeless people, and which was putting together an England national team, for a Street Child Cricket World Cup. Akter was made England's captain.

The Street Child World Cup competition was for cricket teams of young people from deprived backgrounds (aged 13–17) from Bangladesh, England, India, Mauritius, Nepal, Tanzania, and the West Indies playing competitively for their respective national teams, in London and Cambridge and also attending a mini-congress on their human rights run alongside the sporting tournament. Akter spoke about the 'light at the end of the tunnel' this opportunity gave her, at an associated event at the UK Parliament.

After an easy win in the semi-final against Tanzania, England's final was against India South and was played at the famous Lord's Cricket Ground in London just before the International Cricket Council Cricket World Cup internationals. Akter said she was really proud to be playing on the same ground as her sporting heroes like Ben Stokes. It was a close match, Akter's team losing in the final over. The Lord's steward, Ted Clark is quoted as welcoming the new young international talent into the sport, but also asking 'why in 2019, are children still sleeping on the street?'

A future Street Child World Cup is planned for the next ICC Cricket World Cup in India in 2023.

== Recognition ==
For her success at the sport, against the odds, and encouraging others in an all-Asian girls team, Akter was named as one of the BBC's top 100 Women in 2019, for inspiring and influencing others globally. She was quoted as saying about how she feels in her sport: 'All I know is the feeling, the sheer pleasure of the motion feels greater when every breath blows with liberation.'

Akter is now studying BTEC 3 diploma in business at Bradford College and aims to do a degree in accountancy next. She continues to coach and volunteer and to inspire others.

Akter was shortlisted with Sabeha Salam at the Yorkshire County Cricket Club as one of the Rising Stars in Sport at the British Muslim Awards in 2020.
