= Saint Martin Union =

Union of Cox's Bazar District, Chittagong, Bangladesh

Saint Martin Union সেন্টমার্টিন ইউনিয়ন
- Union
- Interactive map of Saint Martin Union
- Country: Bangladesh
- Division: Chittagong Division
- District: Cox's Bazar District
- Upazila: Teknaf Upazila

Area
  - Total: 8 km^{2} (3.1 sq mi)

Population (2022)
  - Total: 8,492
  - Density: 1,100/km^{2} (2,700/sq mi)
- Time zone: UTC+6 (BST)
- Postal code: 4762
- Website: saintmartinup.coxsbazar.gov.bd/en

Saint Martin Union is a Union of Teknaf Upazila under Cox's Bazar District, Bangladesh

== Demography ==
According to the 2022 census, the total population of the Union is 8492. Among them, 8,471 are Muslim, 19 are Hindu and 2 are Buddhist.

Religion-2022
1. Islam (99.8%)
2. Hinduism (0.22%)
3. Buddhism (0.02%)
4. Others (0.00%)
