= Teknaf Beach =

Part of Cox's Bazar Beach

Coordinates: 20.846196°N 92.271963°E

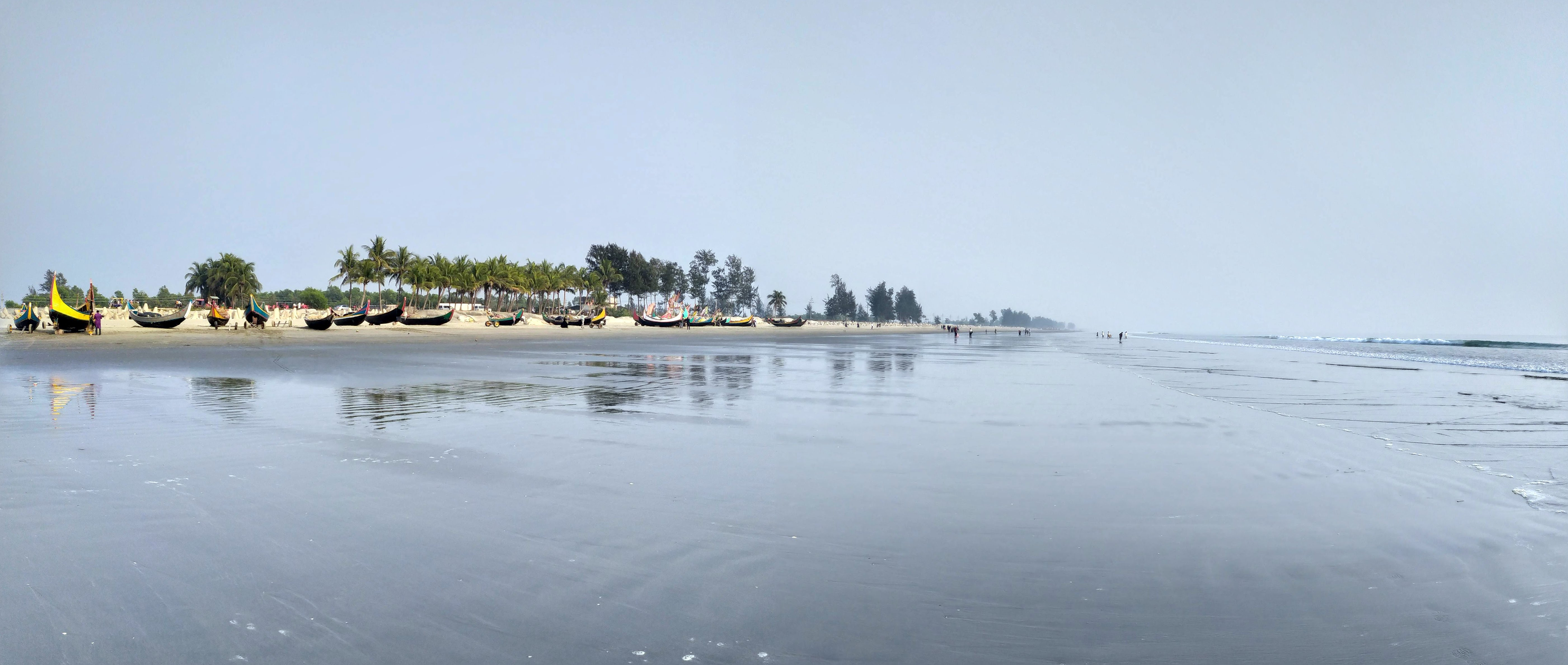
Teknaf Sea Beach

Teknaf Beach (Bengali: টেকনাফ সৈকত) is a part of Cox's Bazar Beach, located at Teknaf Upazila of Cox's bazar district. Teknaf beach is surrounded by the Teknaf peninsula mangrove area. This beach is divided into sections; Shamlapur Beach (Baharchara Beach), Shilakhali Beach, Hajampara Beach, and Shapuree Island Beach.

Fishermen's colorful fishing boats can be seen on Teknaf beach. Near this beach are the dense Zhaoban and to the north the Tainga hills.

In 2020 a boat washed up to the site with more than 24 refugees who lost their life fleeing Myanmar.

== Gallery ==
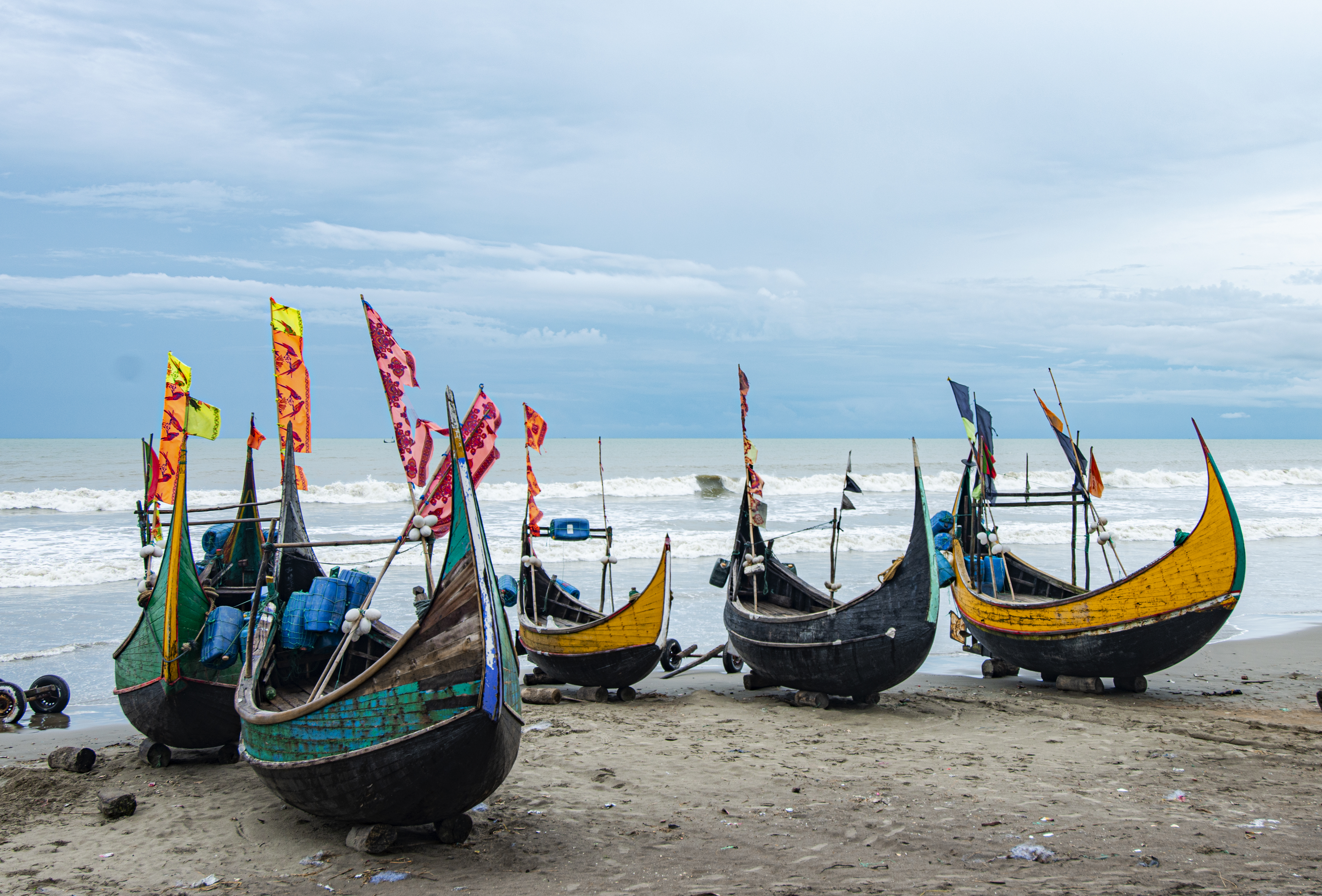
Boats at beach area

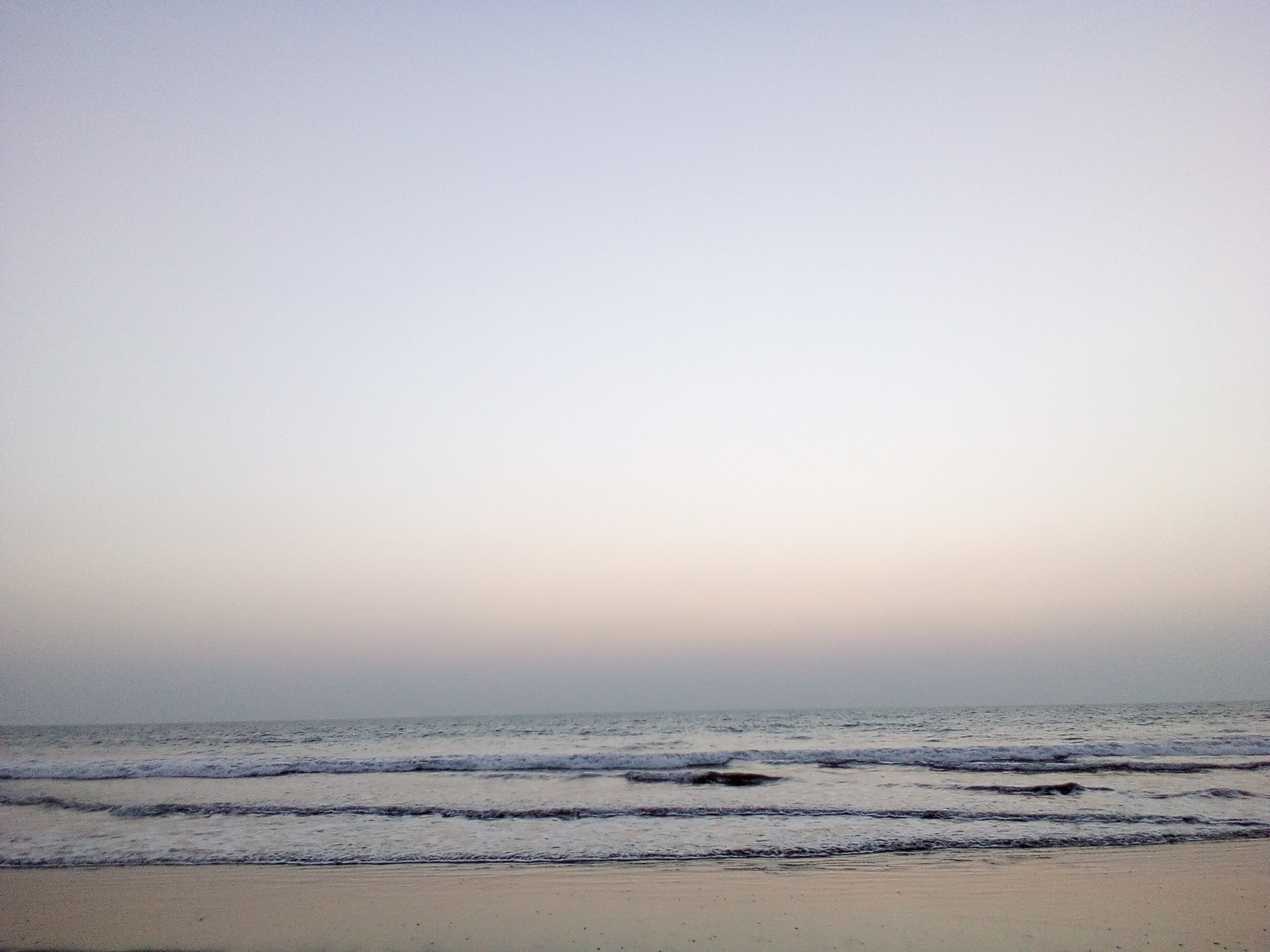
Sunset at beach

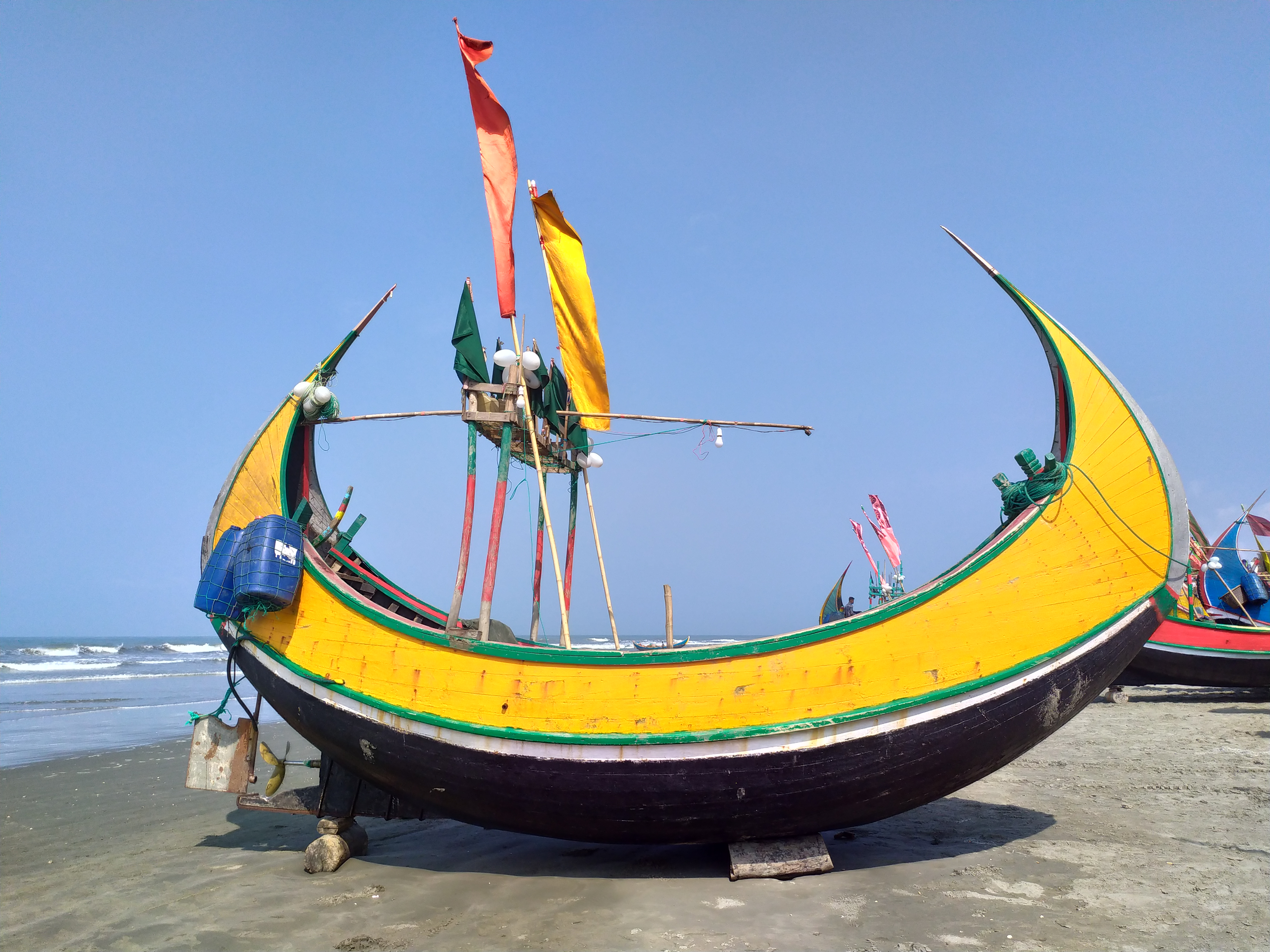
Moon boat at sea beach

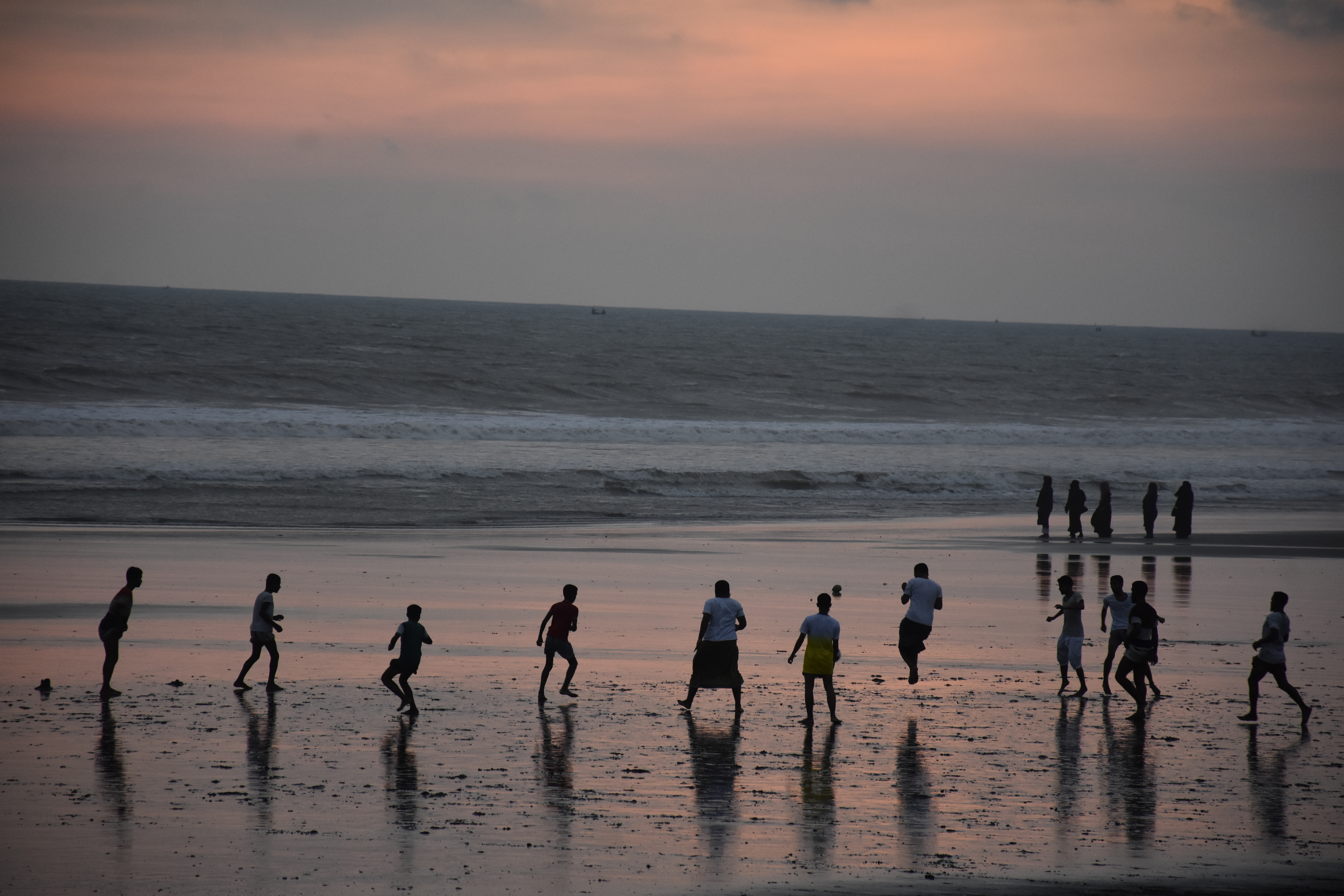
Evening at Teknaf Beach
