= Saint Martin's Island =

Island in Bangladesh

Native name: সেন্টমার্টিন দ্বীপ (Sēnṭmārṭin Dbīp) নারিকেল জিঞ্জিরা (Nārikēl Jinjirā) দারুচিনি দ্বীপ (Dārucini Dbīp)
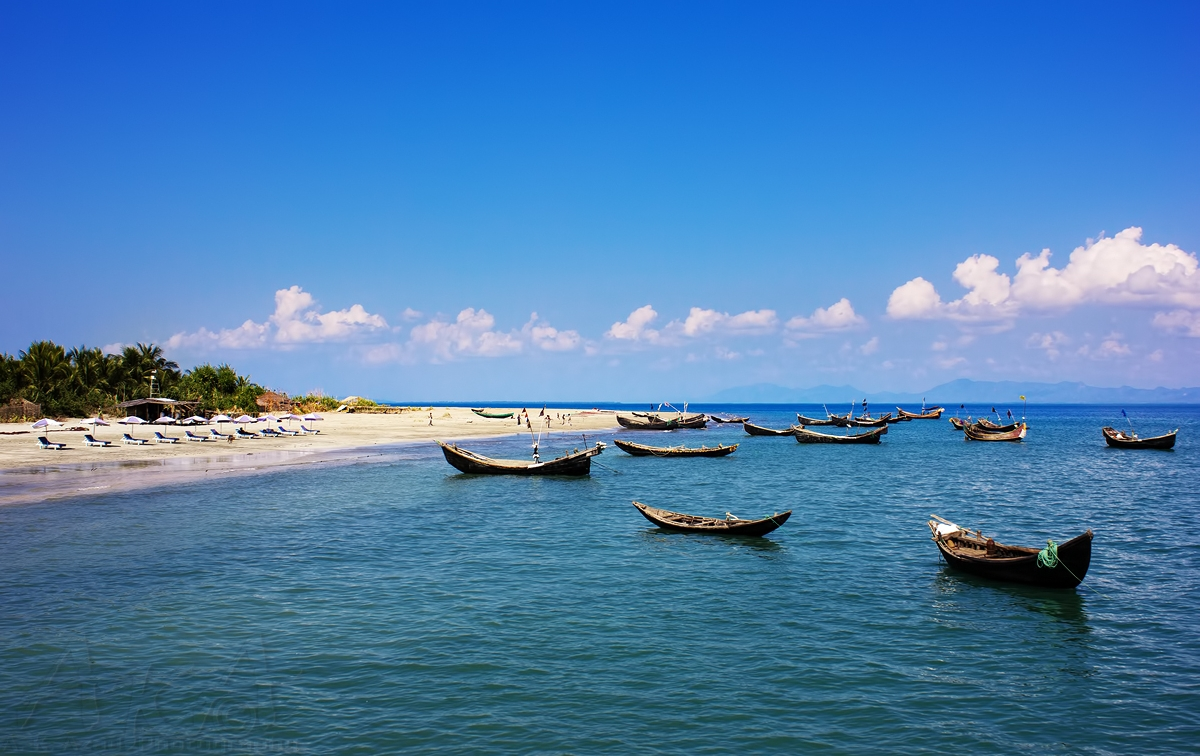
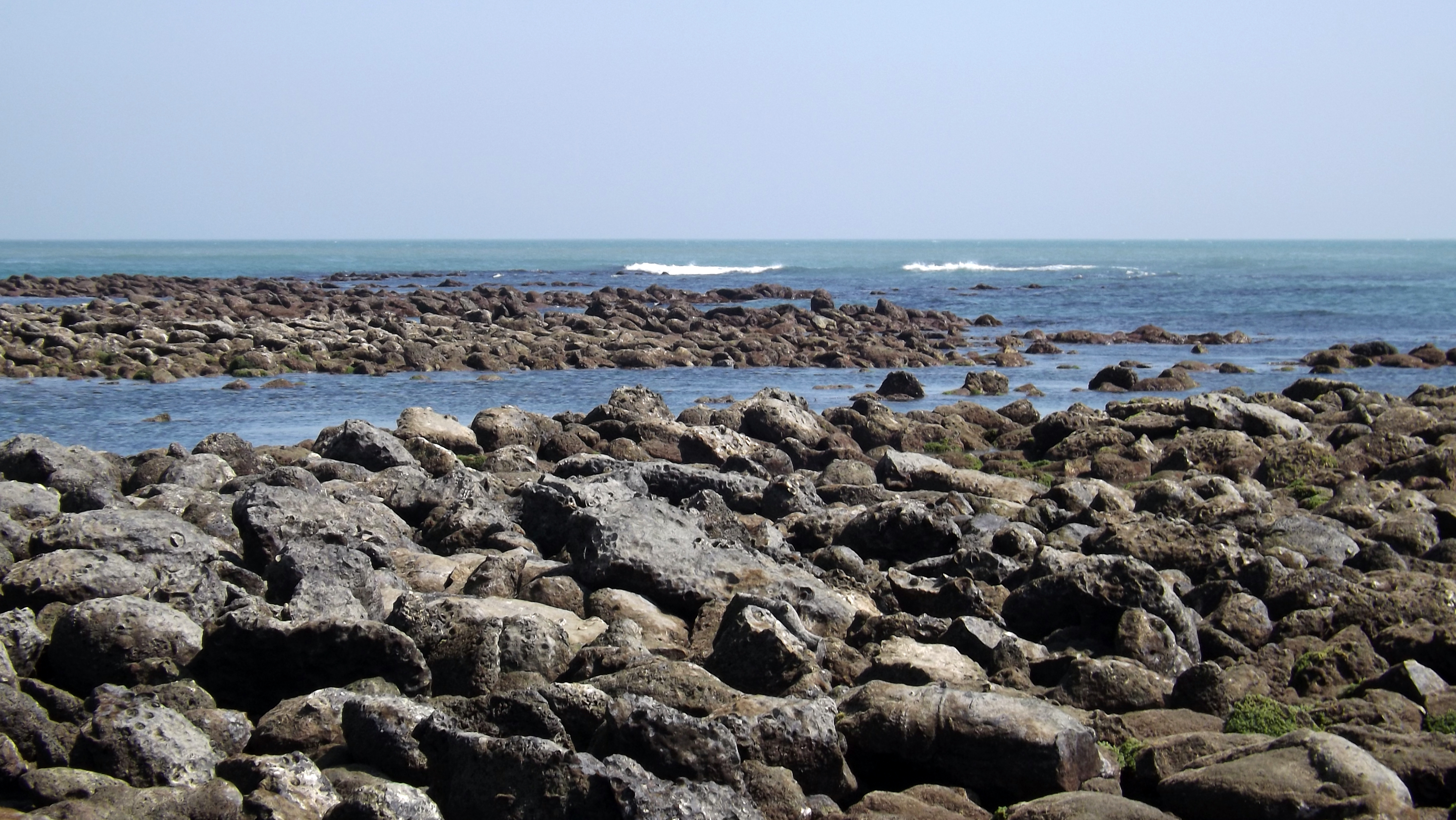
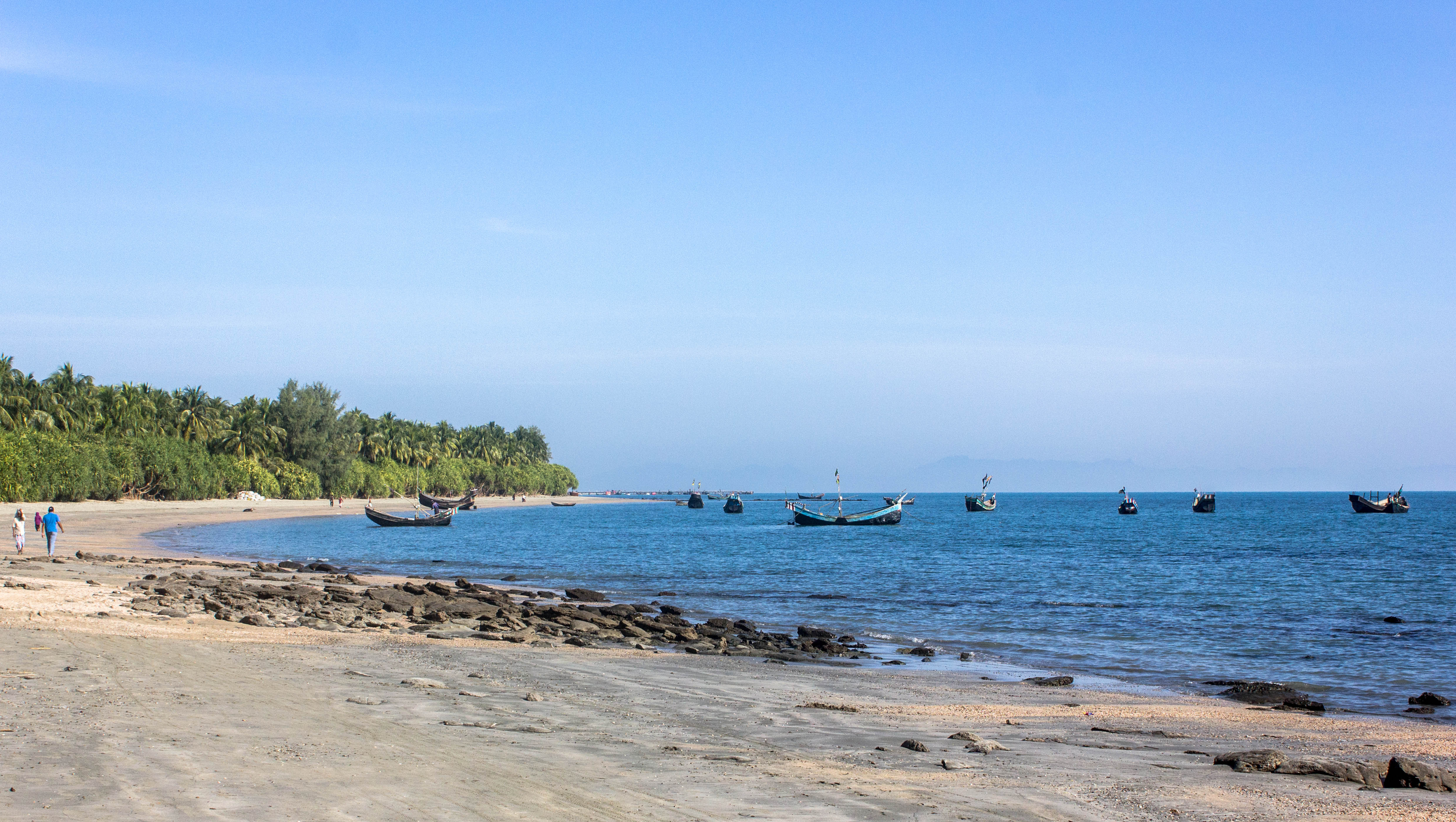
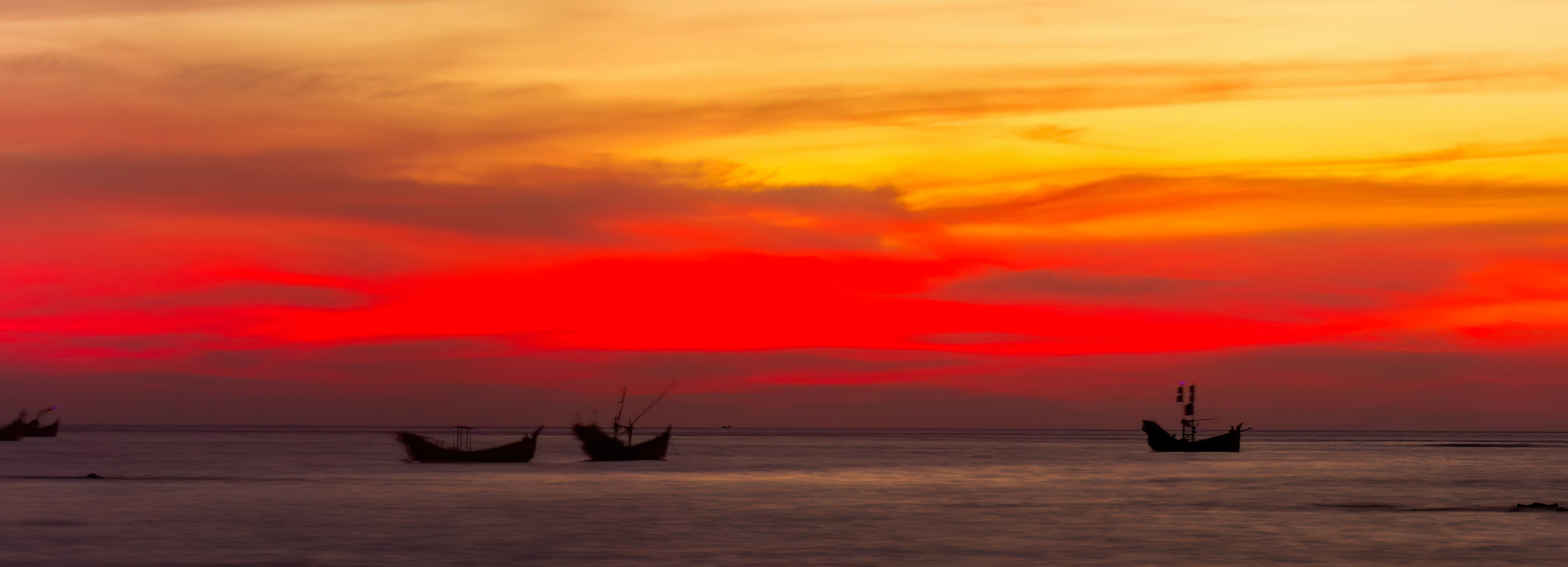
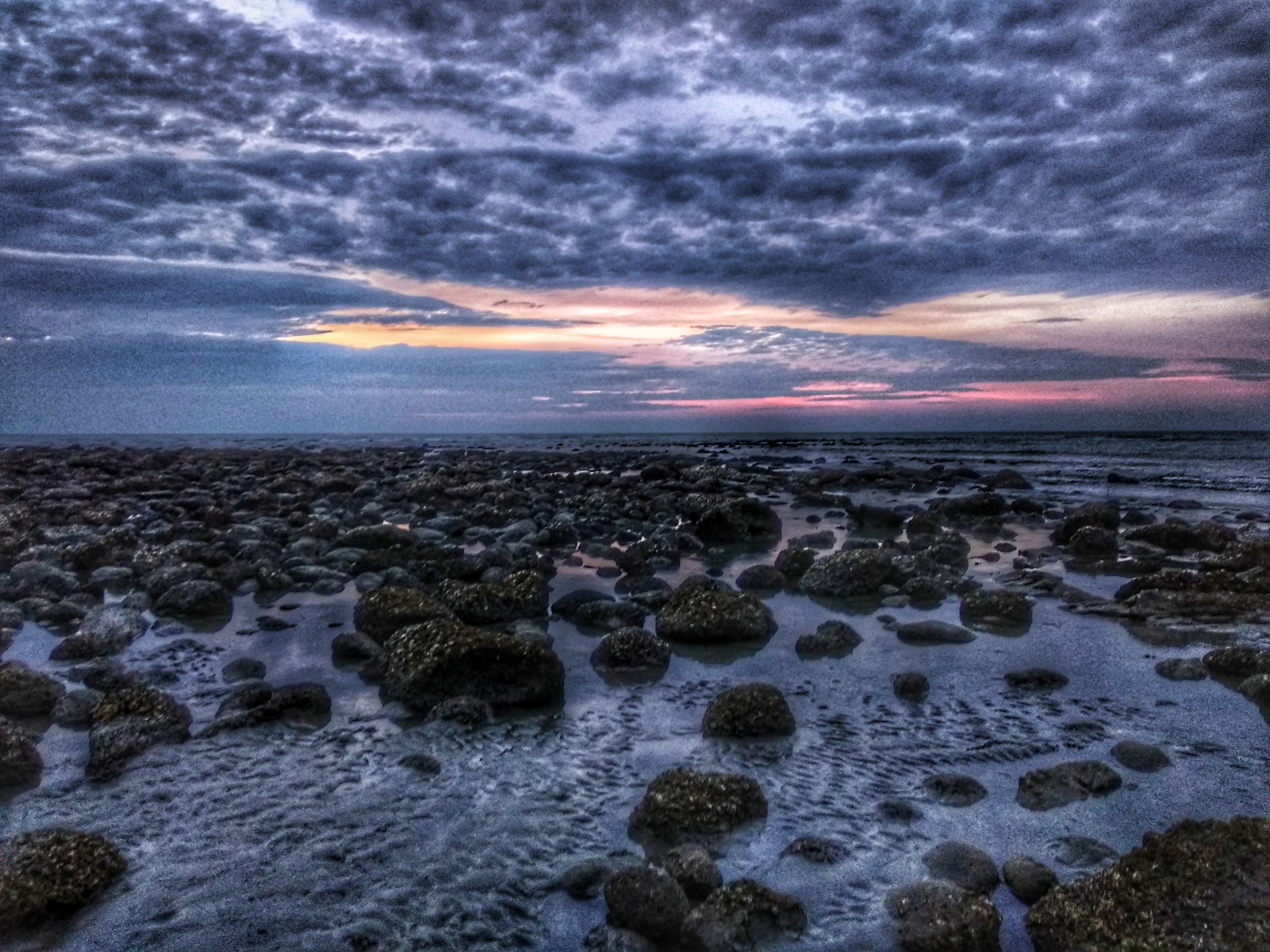
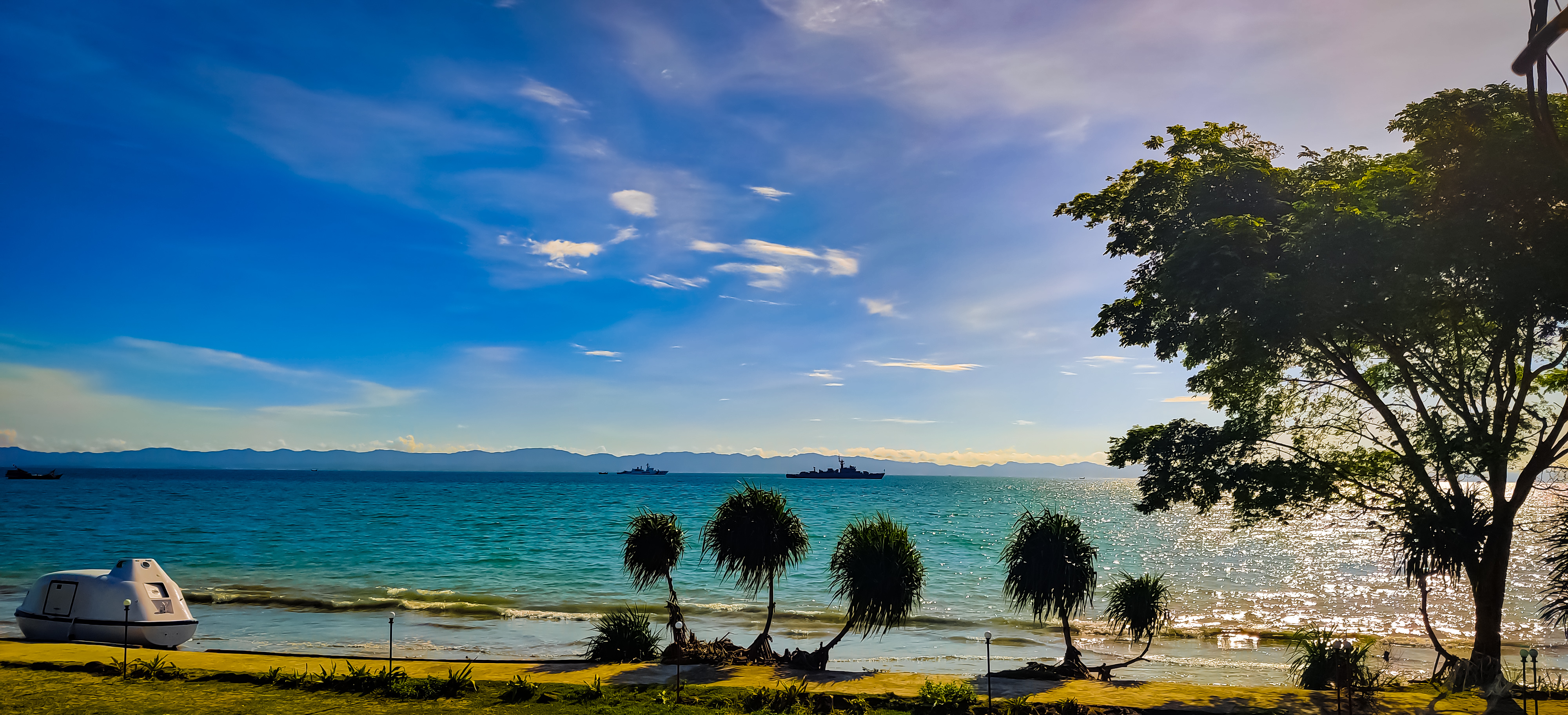
- Clockwise from the top: Fishing boats near the jetty of St. Martin's Island • Corals at the beach of St. Martin's • Corals of St. Martin's in a cloudy afternoon • Mountains off the coast of Myanmar seen from the St. Martin's • Sunset from St. Martin's • Corals at Chhera Dwip
- Interactive map of Saint Martin's Island

Geography
- Location: Bay of Bengal
- Coordinates: 20°36′47″N 92°19′36″E
- Area: 3 km^{2} (1.2 sq mi)
- Length: 9 km (5.6 mi)
- Width: 0.5 km (0.31 mi)

Administration
- Bangladesh
- Administration: Teknaf Upazila, Cox's Bazar District

Demographics
- Population: 8,000
- Saint Martin Island Lighthouse; Narikel Jinjira
- Foundation: concrete base
- Construction: metal skeletal tower
- Height: 35 m (115 ft)
- Shape: square pyramidal skeletal tower with balcony and lantern
- Markings: white and red horizontal bands, white and red horizontal daymark on the top
- Operator: Bangladesh Department of Shipping
- Racon: M
- Focal height: 39 m (128 ft)
- Range: 20 nmi (37 km; 23 mi)
- Characteristic: Fl W 37s

Saint Martin's Island (Bengali: সেন্টমার্টিন দ্বীপ, romanized: Sēnṭmārṭin Dbīp) is a small coral island in the north-eastern part of the Bay of Bengal, about 9 km south of the tip of the Cox's Bazar-Teknaf peninsula, and forms the southernmost part of Bangladesh. It has an area of only 3 km^{2}. A small adjoining island that is separated at high tide, called Chhera Dwip, is about 8 kilometres (5 miles) west of the northwest coast of Myanmar, at the mouth of the Naf River. St. Martin's Island is Bangladesh's only coral island.

A nine-month tourist restriction on St. Martin's Island has been imposed which is to start from February 1, 2025. Currently, only the Cox's Bazar-St. Martin route remains open amid Myanmar border tensions.

== History and description ==
Millennia ago, the island used to be an extension of the Teknaf peninsula, but as a portion of the peninsula was flooded by the Bay of Bengal and submerged, the southernmost part of the peninsula became an island. The island was first settled in the 18th century by Arabian merchants, who named it "Jazira". During British occupation, the island was named after the then Divisional Commissioner of Chittagong, Mr. O.M. Martin, ESQR., CIE, ICS, who was the Commissioner of Chittagong Division between 1938-1940, as St. Martin's Island. Local names of the island are "Narkel Dweep", which means "Coconut Island," and "Daruchini Dweep," which means "Cinnamon Island".

== Administration ==
The island makes up the Saint Martin's Union Parishad. It has nine villages/areas:

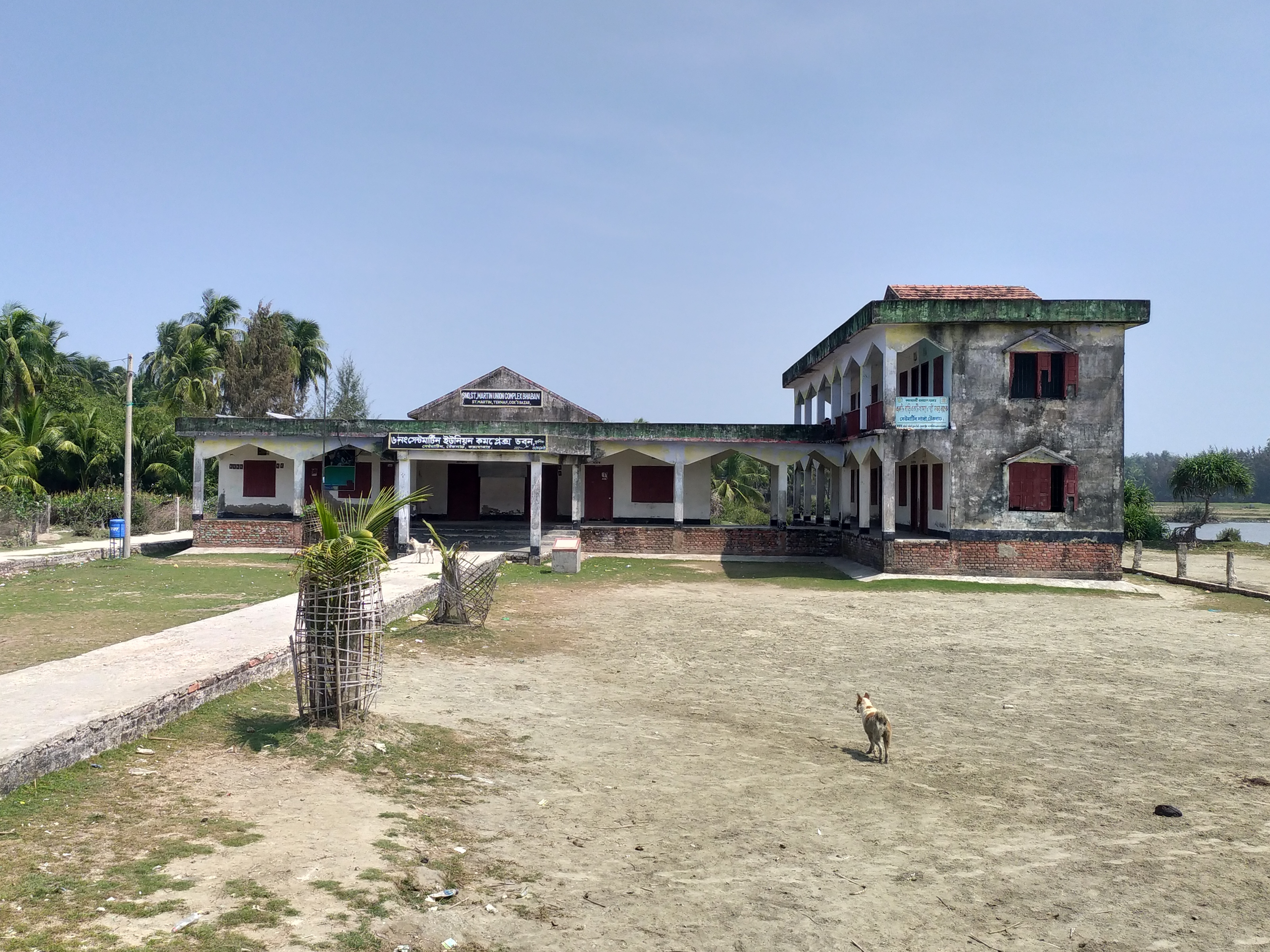
UP complex of Saint Martin Island

- Paschim Para (Western Neighbourhood)
- Deil Para
- Uttar Para (Northern Neighbourhood)
- Majher Para (Middle Neighbourhood)
- Purba Para (Eastern Neighbourhood)
- Konar Para (Edge Neighbourhood)
- Nazrul Para (Neighbourhood of Nazrul)
- Golachipa (literally "narrow neck")
- Dakkhin Para (Southern Neighbourhood)

== Inhabitants ==
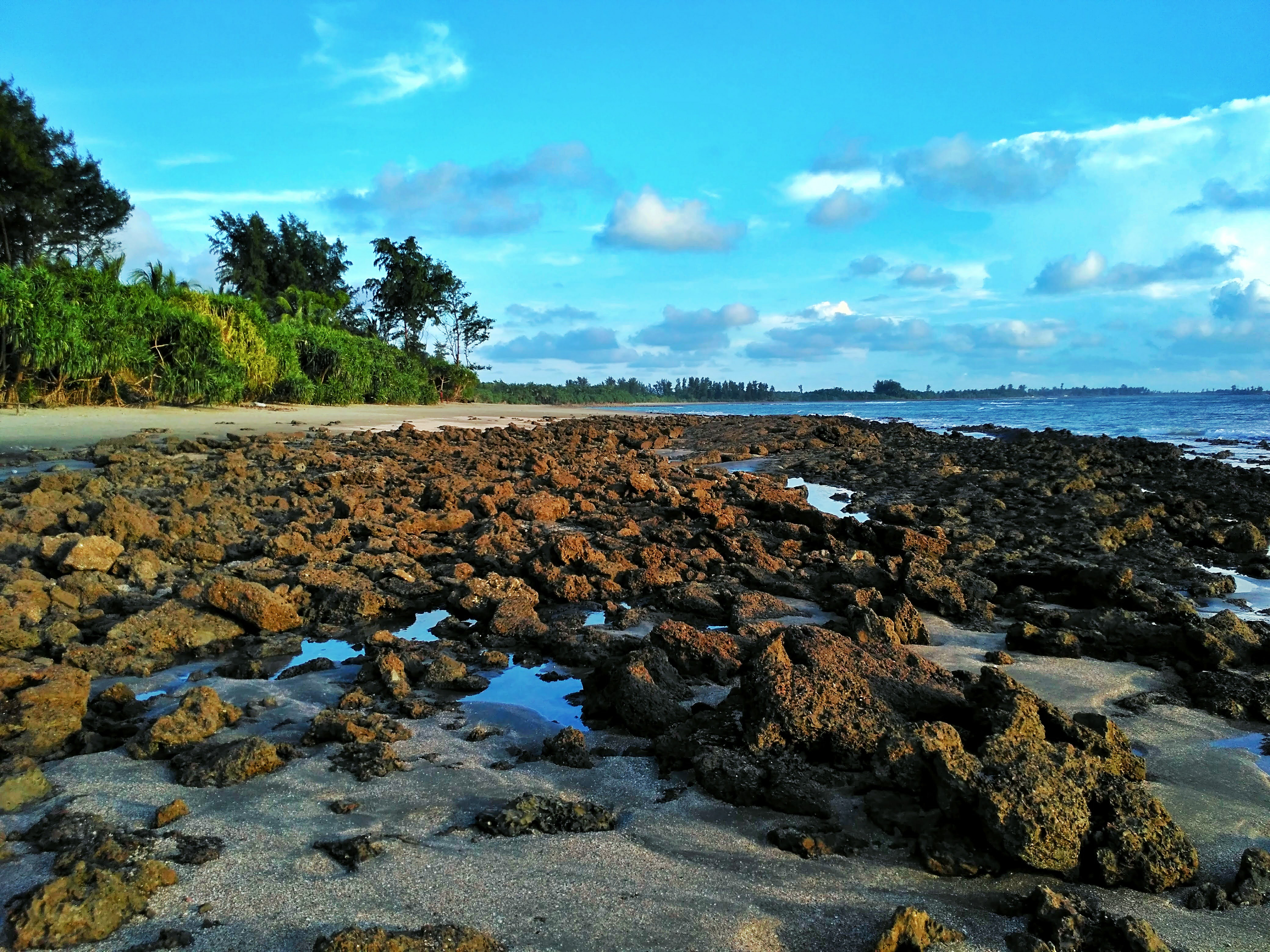
Coral in St. Martin's Island .

The island's economy is primarily based on fishing, which supports the majority of its roughly 3,700 inhabitants. The other staple crops are rice and coconut. Being very common on the island, algae are collected, dried, and exported to Myanmar. Between October and April, the fishermen from neighbouring areas bring their caught fish to the island's temporary wholesale market. However, imports of chicken, meat and other foods come in from mainland Bangladesh and Myanmar. As the centre and the south are mainly farmland and makeshift huts, most of the permanent structures are around the far north of the island.

During the rainy season, because of the dangerous conditions on the Bay of Bengal, the inhabitants are unable to travel to mainland (Teknaf), leaving the island isolated. There is a hospital on the island, but in the past there has often been no doctor.

== Biological diversity and bioprospecting potential ==
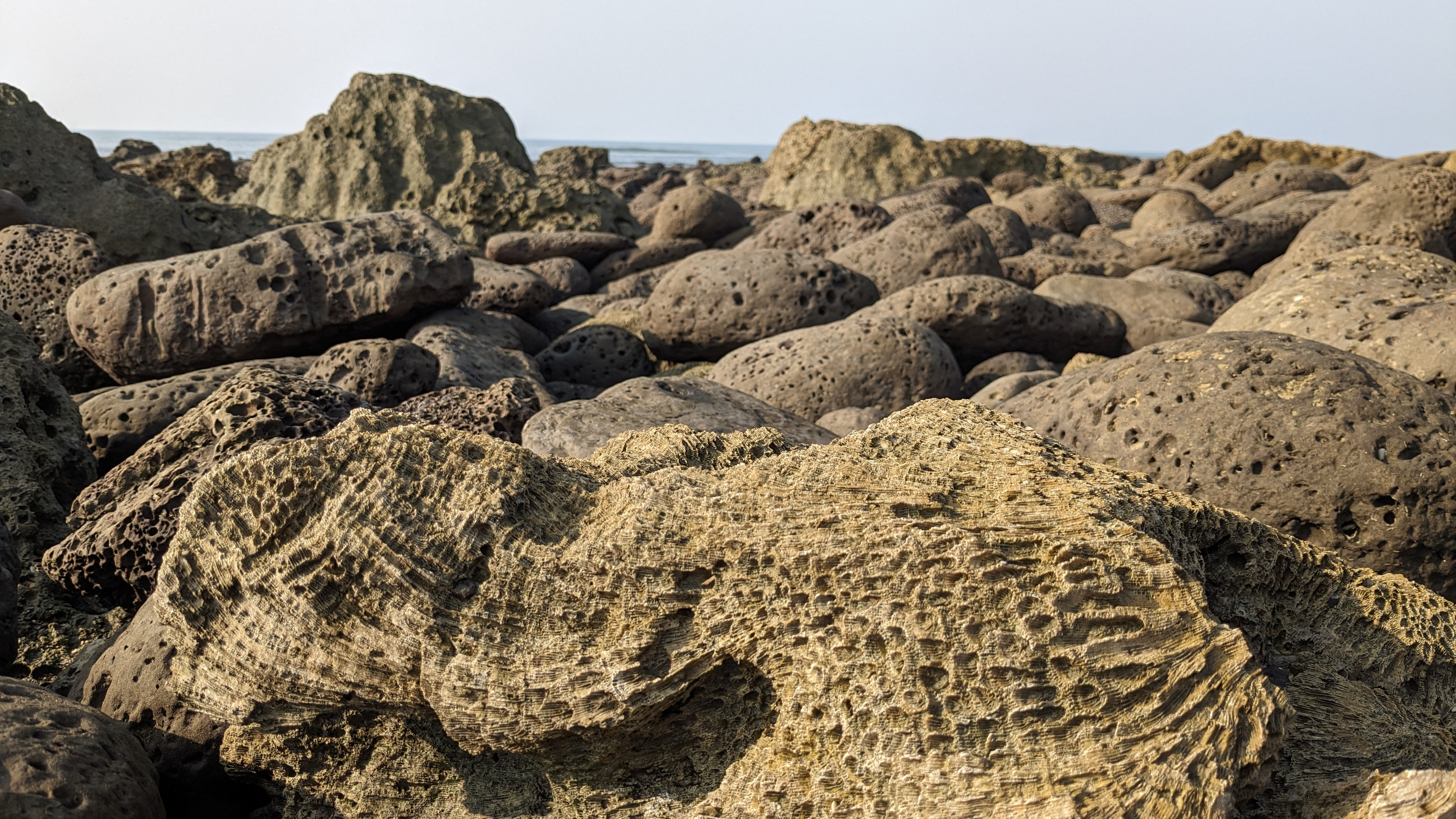
Marine coral on the island

Research by the Bangladesh Department of Environment (DoE), with the assistance of the UNDP, demonstrates that the island has a number of ecosystems, including coral-rich areas, mangroves, lagoons and stony areas. The island serves as a safe haven for diverse species of fauna. In 2010, surveys recorded 153 species of seaweeds, 66 species of coral, 187 species of oysters, 240 species of fish, 120 species of birds, 29 species of reptiles and 29 species of mammals on St Martin's Island. The area in vicinity has been declared as a Marine Protected Area in 2022.

Marine sponges and their associated microbes produce an enormous array of antitumor, antiviral, anti-inflammatory, immunosuppressive, antibiotic and other bioactive molecules. A total of 15 bacterial genera comprising 31 different bacterial species from the 9 collected marine sponges of the island. Among them Bacillus subtilis strains WS1A and YBS29 have great probiotic potential. It can produce antimicrobial compounds and prevent motile Aeromonas septicemia disease (a major fish disease in Bangladesh) of Rohu (Labeo rohita). Bacillus subtilis strains WS1A and YBS29 produce different types of antimicrobial peptides. Fish (Labeo rohita) fed with extracellular products of Bacillus subtilis strains WS1A and YBS29 develop complete disease resistance. The metabolites and bioactive compounds derived from marine sponges and sponge microbes also afford abundant potential for pharmaceutical and biotechnological applications.

== Transportation ==
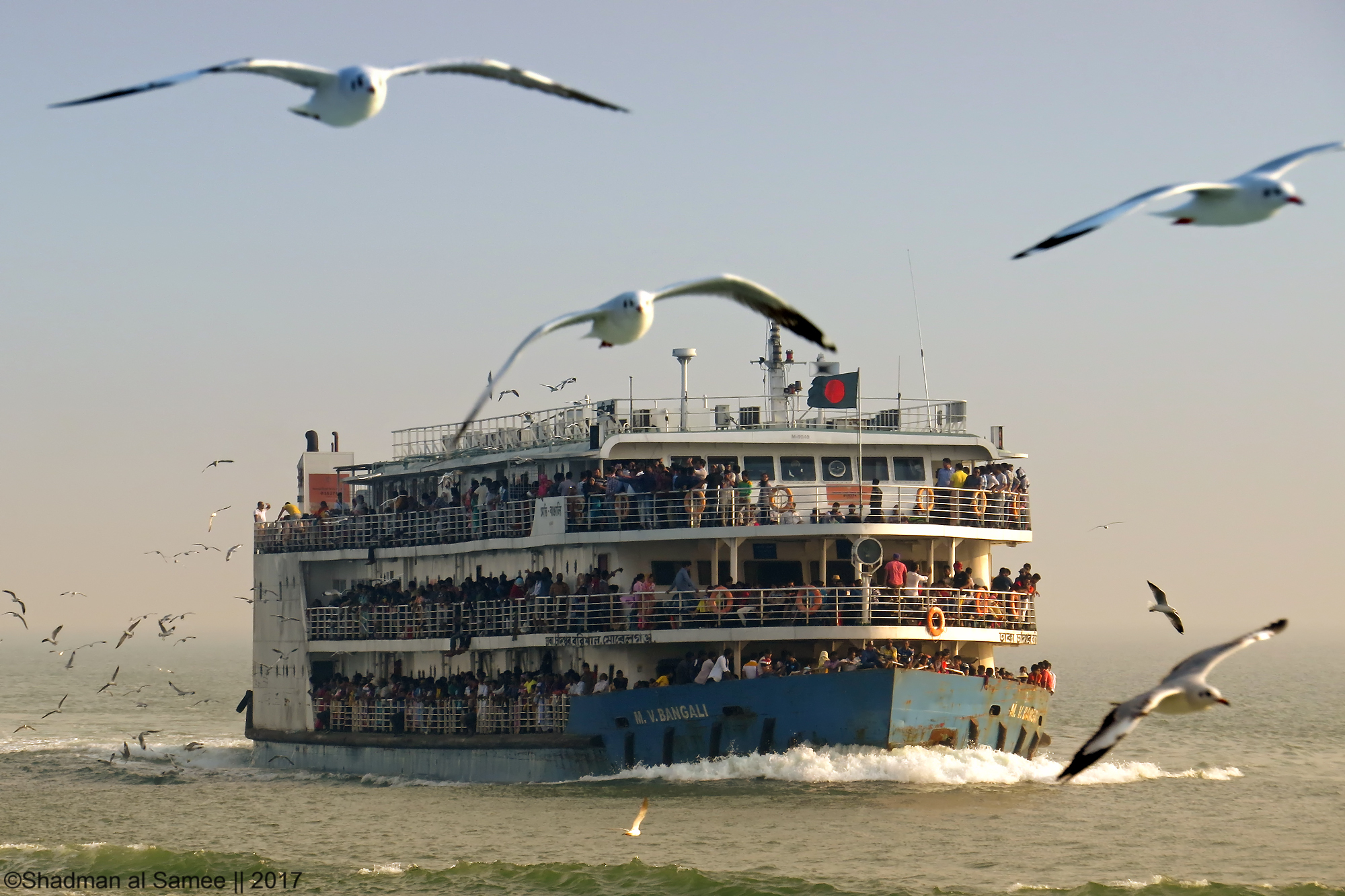
M.V. Bangali underway

The only way to reach Saint Martin Island is by water transportation: boats and ships (mostly for tourists) from Cox Bazar and Teknaf. It is the southernmost union of Bangladesh situated 120 km away from Cox's Bazar city. The internal transport for the island is battery-driven auto rickshaw, bike or bi-cycle. The roads are made of concrete, and their condition is decent. Most hotels run generators until 11 PM which is not allowed afterward, so they rely on solar power, which is popular throughout the island. There had been no electricity supply from the national grid since a hurricane in 1991 but now the electricity supply is decent and many shops and resorts also use diesel generator or solar panels to meet the demand.

== Tourism ==
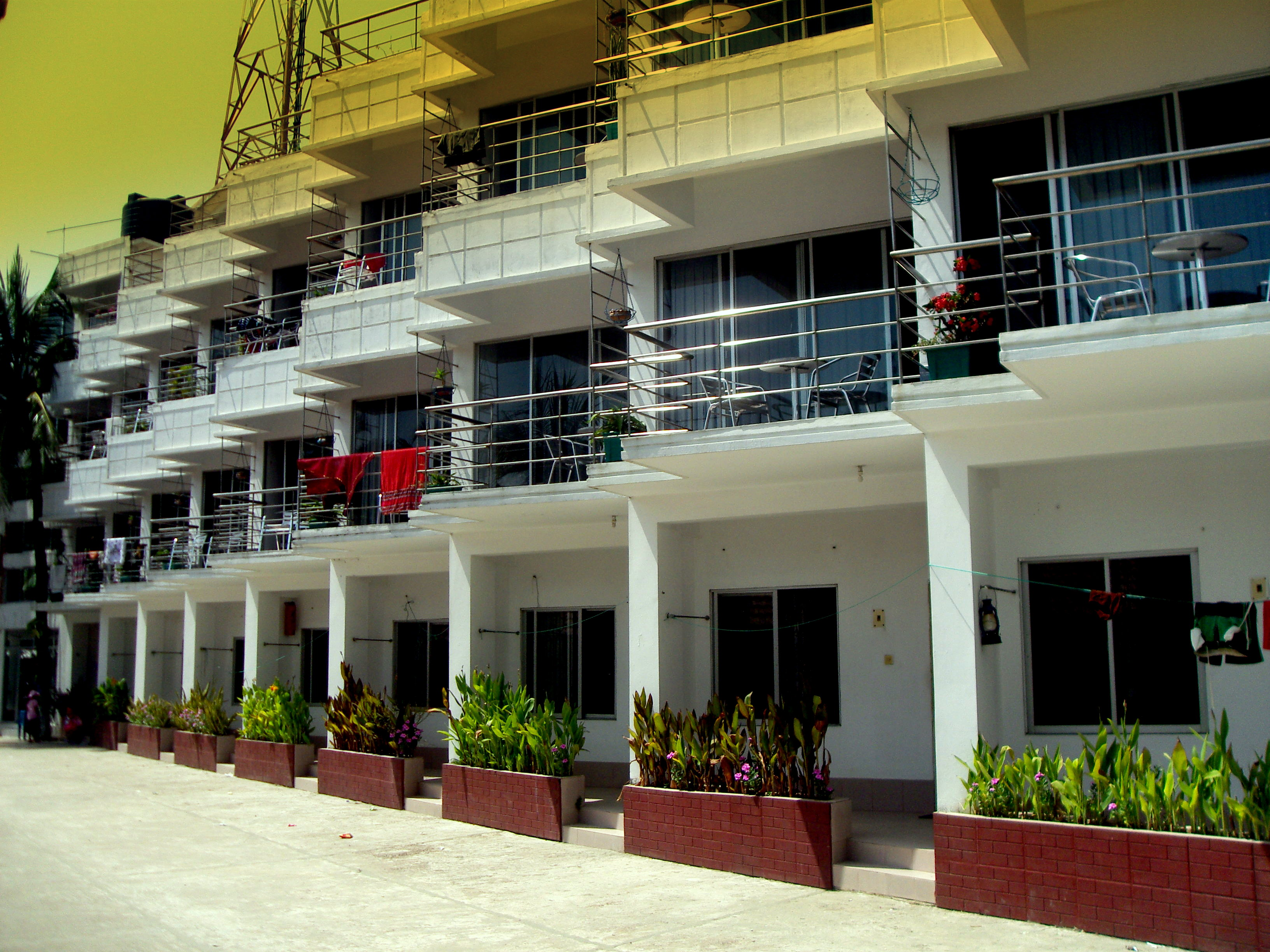
A resort hotel on St. Martin's Island

Saint Martin Island has become a tourist spot, and eight shipping liners run daily trips to the island. Nowadays, tourist has become friendly to Eco tourism. Tourists can book their trip either from Chittagong or from Cox's Bazar. The surrounding coral reef has an extension named Chera Dwip. A small bush is there, which is the only green part. People do not live on this part, so it is advisable for the tourists to go there early and come back by afternoon.

A number of efforts have been proposed to preserve the several endangered species of turtles that nest on the island, as well as the corals, some of which are found only on Narikel Jinjira. Pieces of the coral reef are being removed to be sold to tourists. Nesting turtles are sometimes taken for food, and their hatchlings are often distracted by the twinkling lights along the beach. Fish, a few recently discovered, are being overfished. Every year the fishermen must venture further out to sea to get their catch. Most of them use motor-less boats.

It is possible to walk around the island in a day because it measures only 8 km^{2} (3 sq. mile), shrinking to about 5 km^{2} (2 sq. mi) during high tide. The island is based on sedimentary rock. Its north-eastern side and southern-most part including Chhera Dwip is surrounded by sparse coral colonies. The sedimentary rocky reef surrounding the island is often misunderstood as 'coral reef'

Saint Martin lost 70% of its coral reef between 1980 and 2018 due to anthropogenic factors. This is an estimation based on Geospatial Techniques. Field level research data in this regard is nearly non-existent.

As tourism expanded to the island over the past decades, occasionally confusion arose between the Asian Saint Martin island and the Caribbean island with the same name.

== Sovereignty dispute and shootings of St. Martin's fishermen ==
Fishing is one of largest professional activities of St. Martin's Island's 5,500 residents; however, territorial disputes between Myanmar and Bangladesh have resulted in a state of tension between the countries that can erupt into violence, often targeting unarmed Bangladeshi fishermen. Below is a brief summary of shooting incidents against St. Martin's fishermen:

- On October 7, 1998, between three and five Bangladeshi fishermen were killed by Burmese Navy forces just off the coast of St. Martin's Island.
- On September 8, 1999, one Bangladeshi fisherman was shot and killed by Burmese Navy forces near Saint Martin Island. Nine crewmen from the victim's fishing boat abandoned it, swam for their lives, and were rescued by Bangladeshi forces. The Bangladeshi government lodged a formal protest note to Myanmar.
- On August 20, 2000, the Bangladeshi police reported that Burmese border guards had shot and killed four Bangladeshi fishermen off the coast of St. Martin's Island.
- In 2011 pirates attacked fishermen 5 km off the coast of Saint Martin Island and killed four of them.
- On 6 October 2018, the Government of Myanmar updated its 2015-2018 map of Myanmar Information Management Unit showing St. Martin as a part of their sovereign territory and spread the maps in two global websites. Following the event, the Myanmar Ambassador in Dhaka was summoned by the Government of Bangladesh on 6 October 2018. Rear Admiral (retd) M Khurshed Alam, maritime affairs secretary at the Ministry of Foreign Affairs, Government of Bangladesh handed over a strongly worded protest note to him. The Myanmar envoy said it was a "mistake" to show the Saint Martin Island as part of his country's territory.
- On June 11 2024, an unidentified armed group from Myanmar fired upon an island-bound speed boat along the Naf River. Moreover, warships belonging to Myanmar are now visible from Saint Martin's.

== Climate and weather ==
The best weather is usually between November and February; this is the major tourist season. Between March and July, cyclones can strike. The island was devastated by a cyclone in 1991 but has fully recovered, and was untouched by the 2004 tsunami. March to July is off-season for tourists.

== Gallery ==
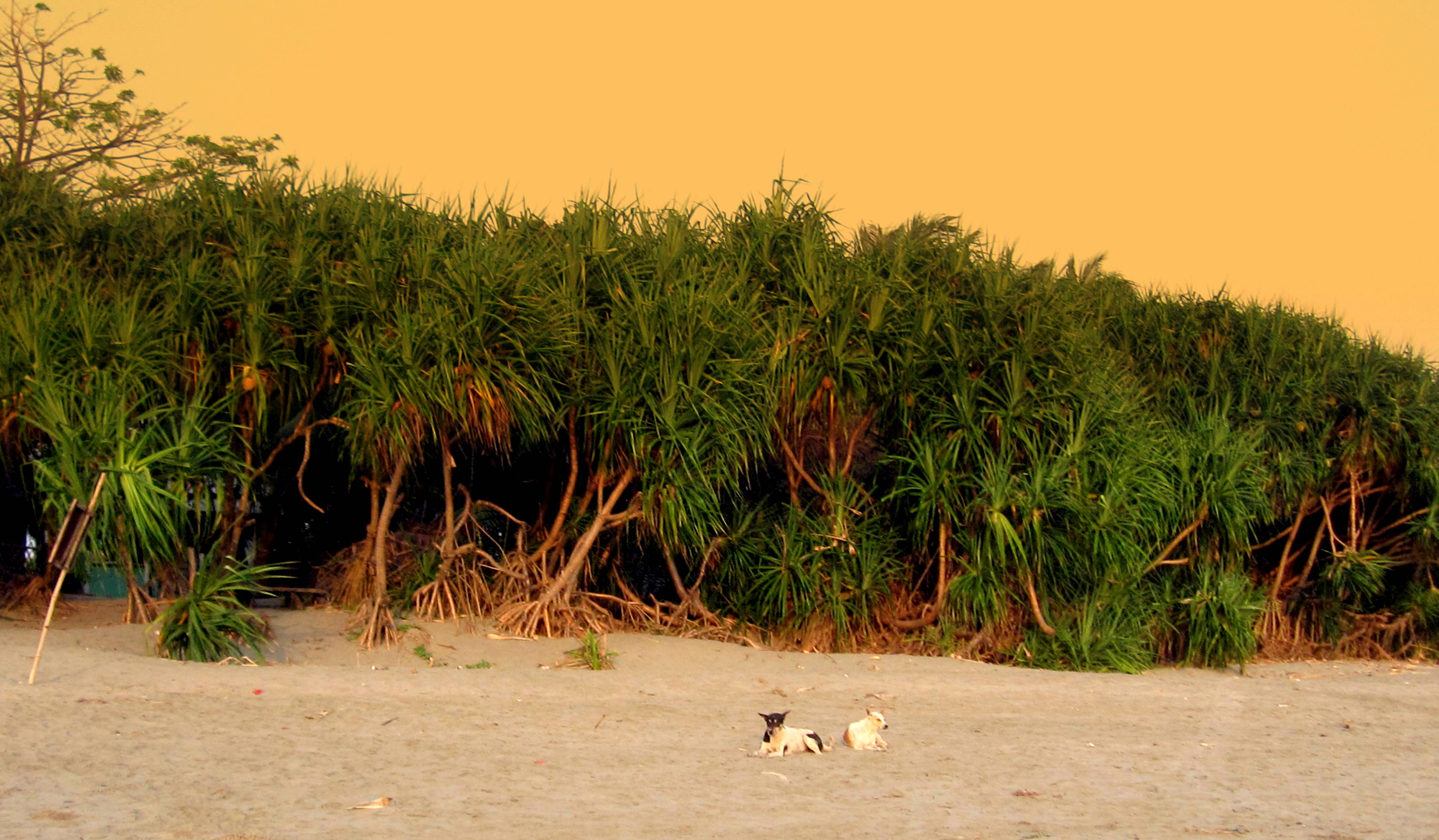
Keya Tree (Pandanus odorifer) of Saint Martin's Island

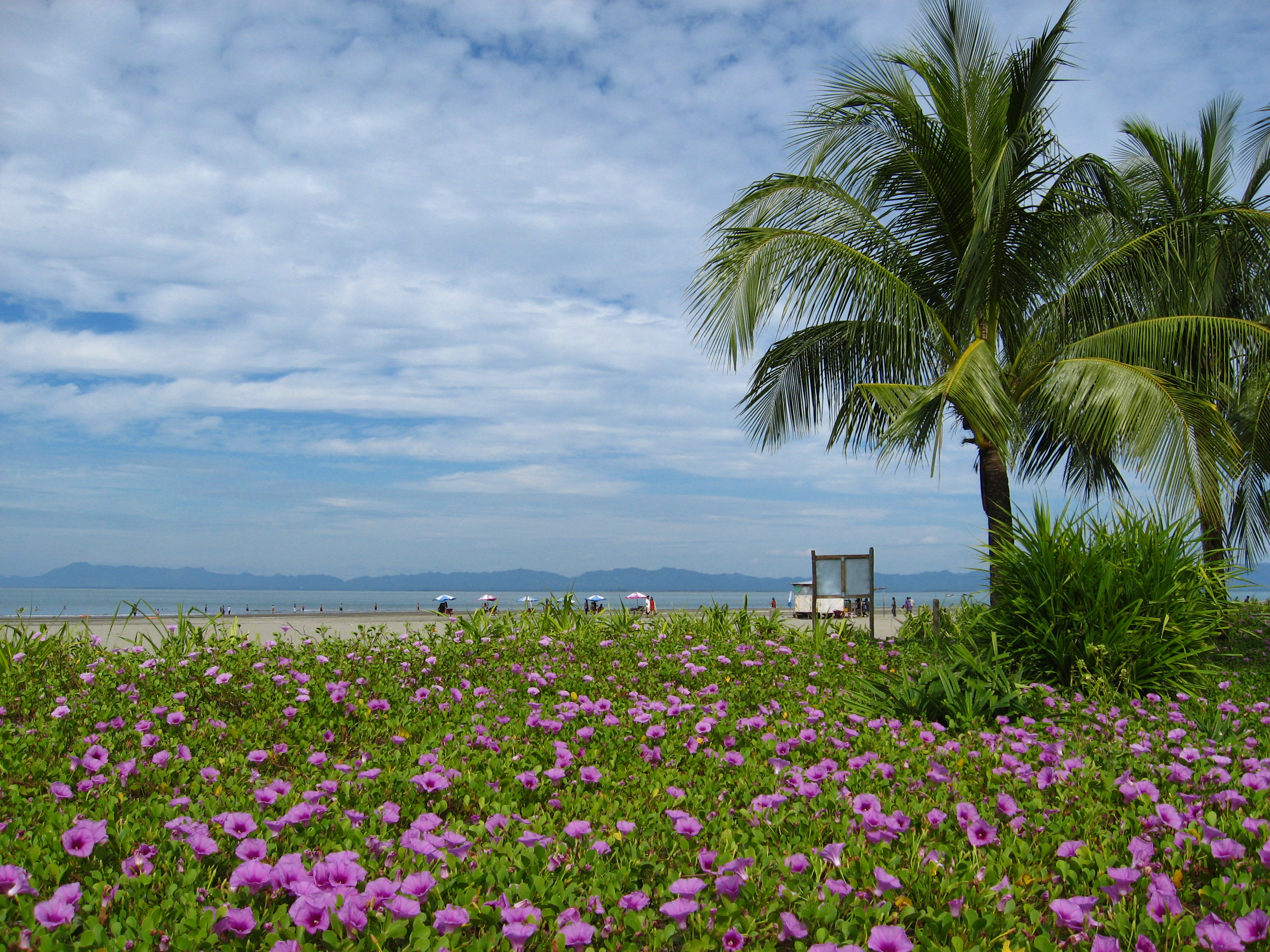
East view of Saint Martins Island

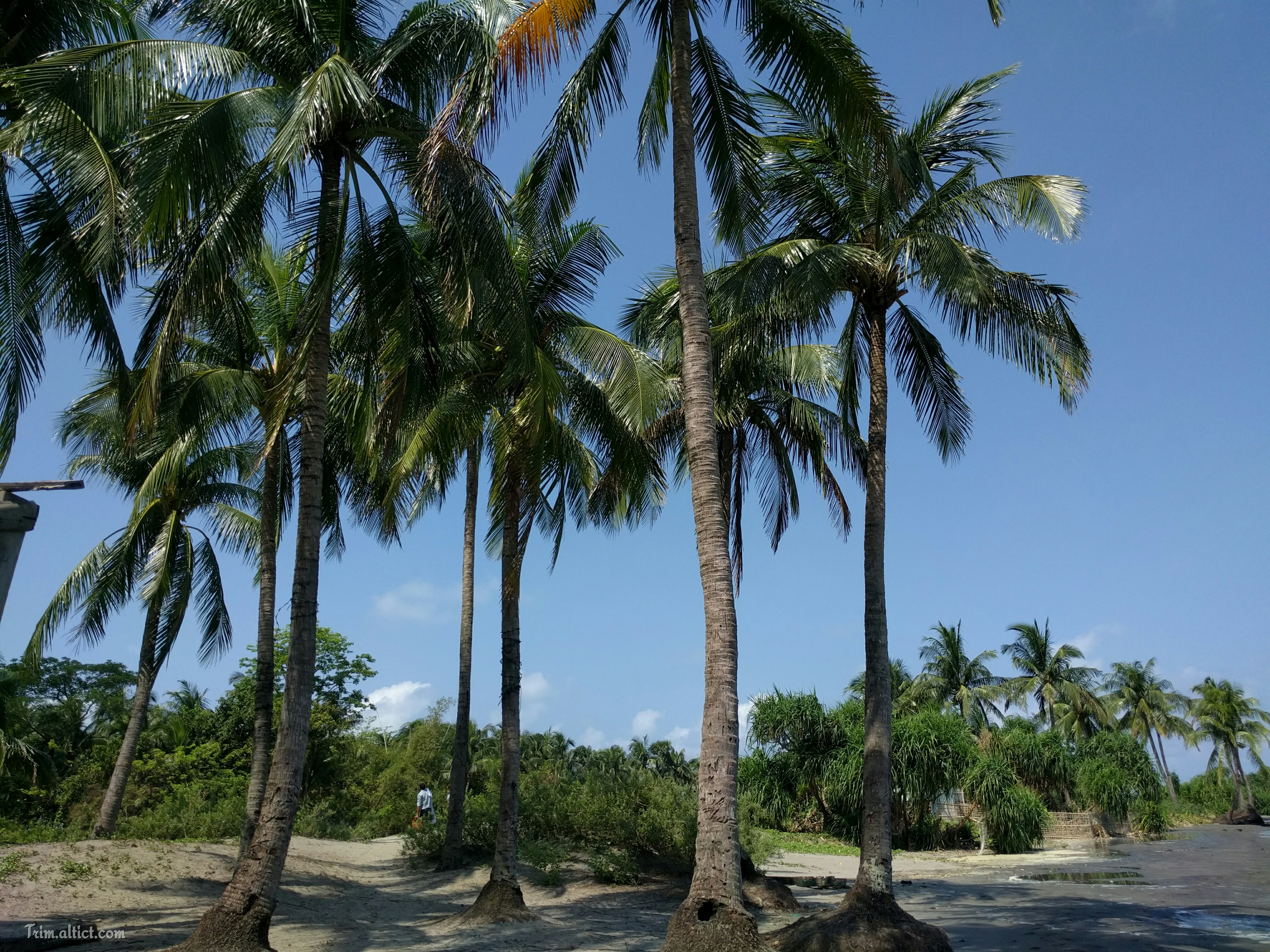
Coconut garden Saint Martins Island

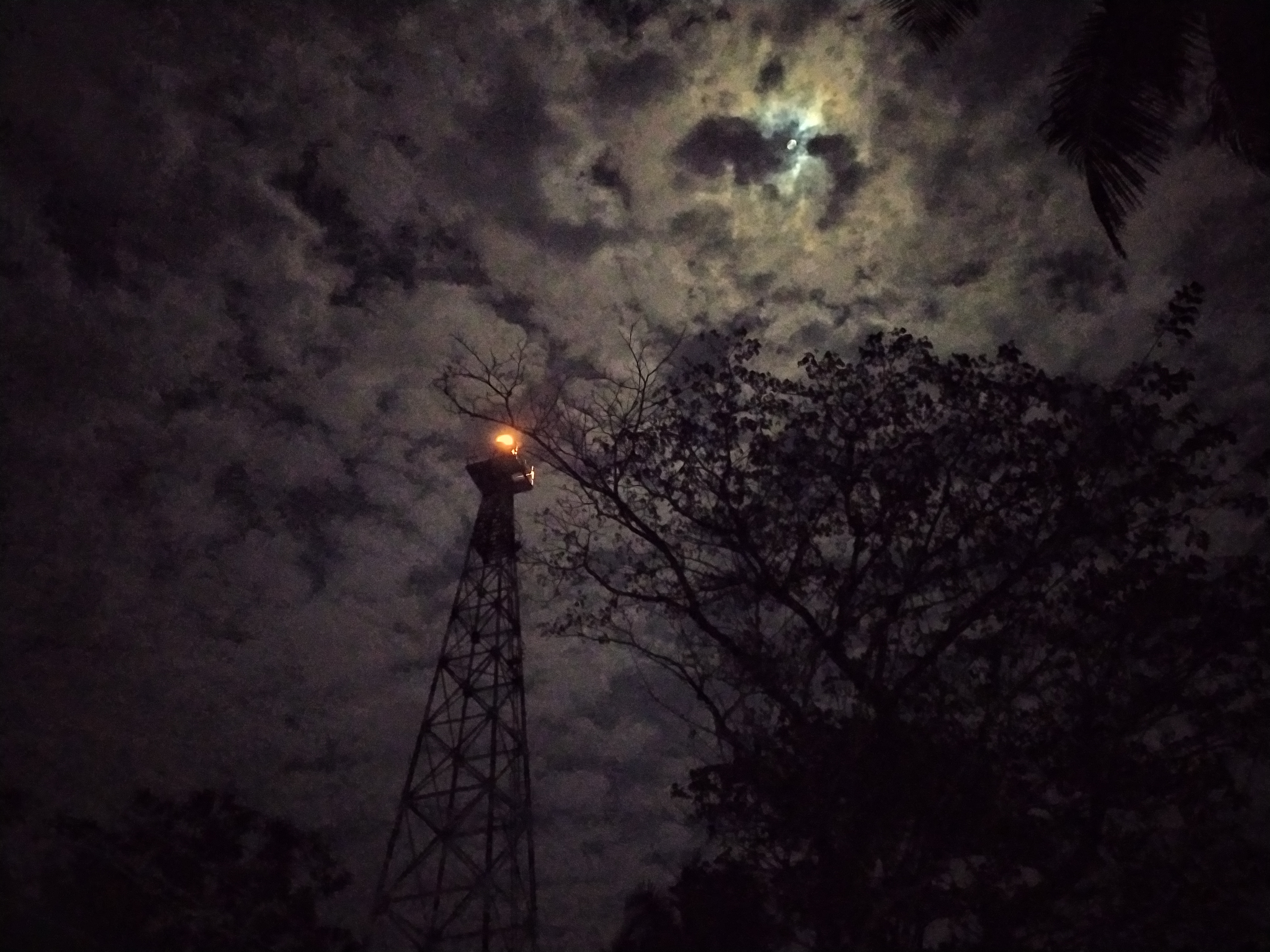
Light house of St. Martin's Island

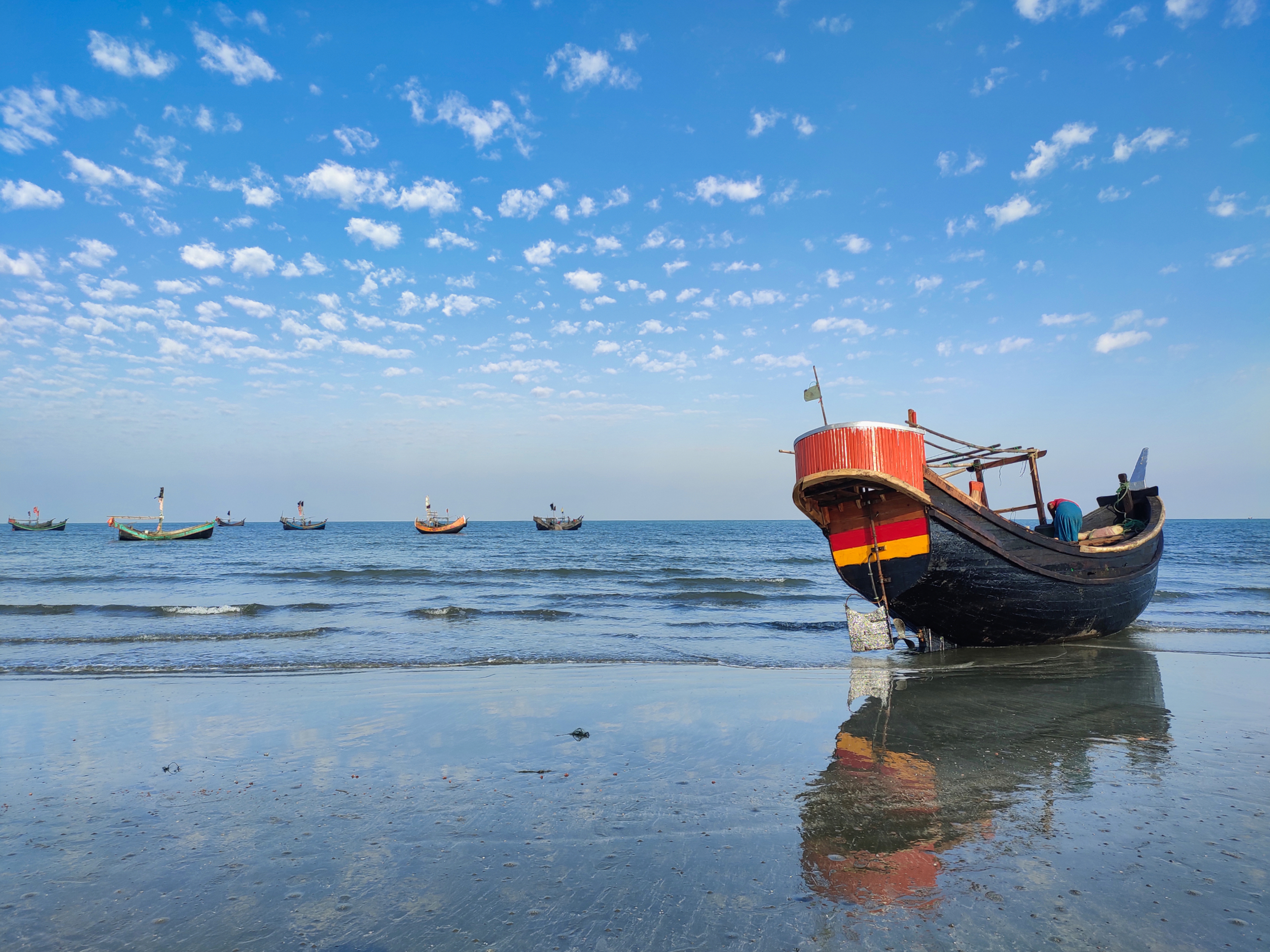
Boats at St. Martin's Island

== See also ==
- List of islands of Bangladesh
- Tourism in Bangladesh
- List of lighthouses in Bangladesh

== Sources ==
- Islam, M. Z. 2001. First Reef Check Survey in Bangladesh. Reef Check Newsletter, Volume-6, Issue 2, August 2006.
- Islam, M. Z. 2005. St. Martin Pilot Project, National Conservation Strategy (NCS) Implementation Project-1, Final Report, Ministry of Environment & Forest, Government of the People's Republic of Bangladesh, 2001, 119 pp.
- Marinelife Alliance, 2016. Final Report: Conservation of Sea Turtle along Bangladesh Coastal & Marine Territory, under Strengthening Regional Protection for Wildlife Protection Project (SRCWPP), Bangladesh Forest Department, Project ID-W2-06, 2013. 2016 Dec, 112 Pg.
