= Teknaf Upazila =

Teknaf টেকনাফ
- Upazila
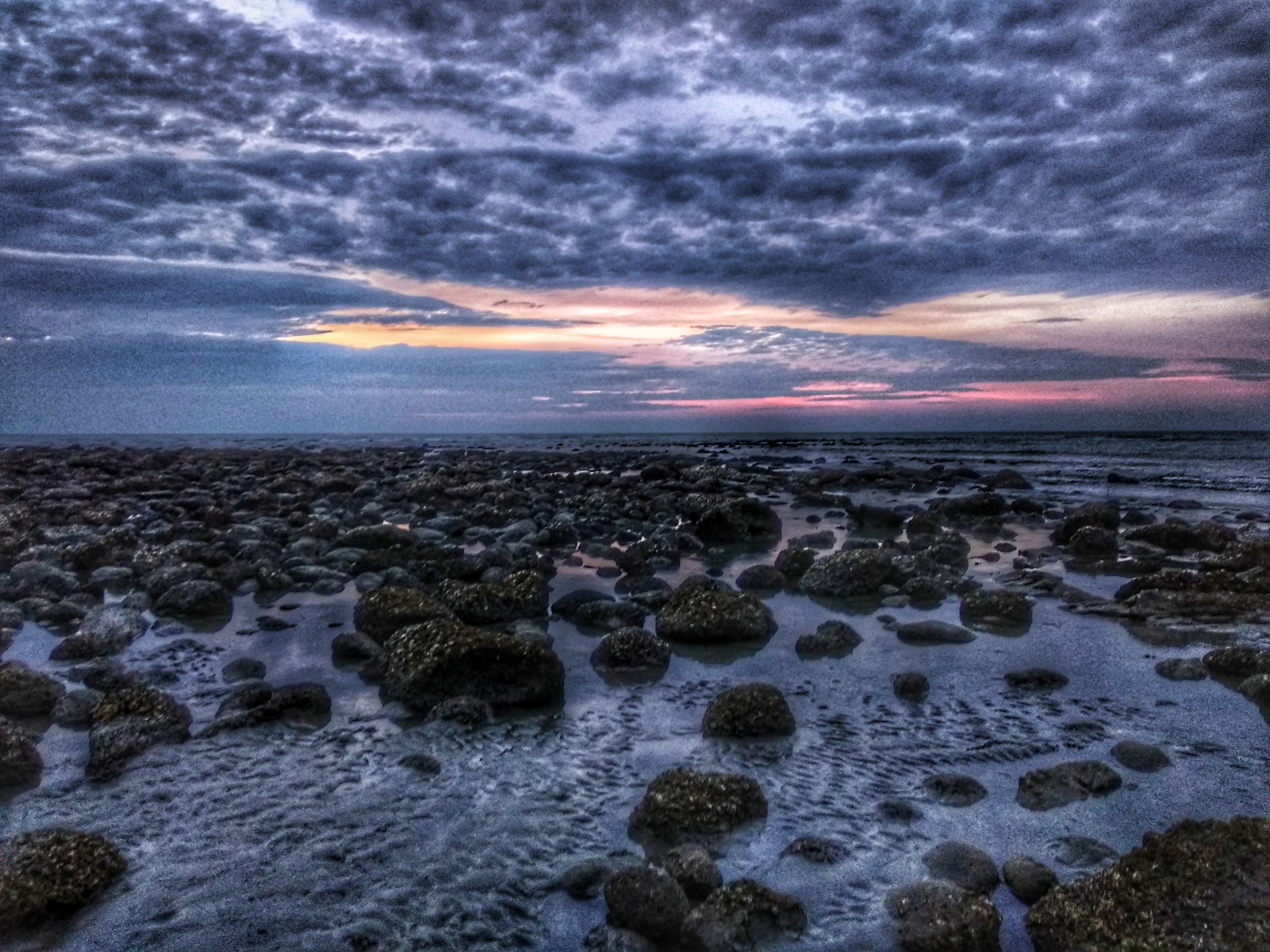
- St. Martin's Island

- Coordinates: 20°52′N 92°18′E
- Country: Bangladesh
- Division: Chittagong
- District: Cox's Bazar

Area
  - Total: 388.66 km^{2} (150.06 sq mi)

Population (2022)
  - Total: 333,865
  - Density: 859.02/km^{2} (2,224.8/sq mi)
- Time zone: UTC+6 (BST)
- Postal code: 4760
- Website: teknaf.coxsbazar.gov.bd

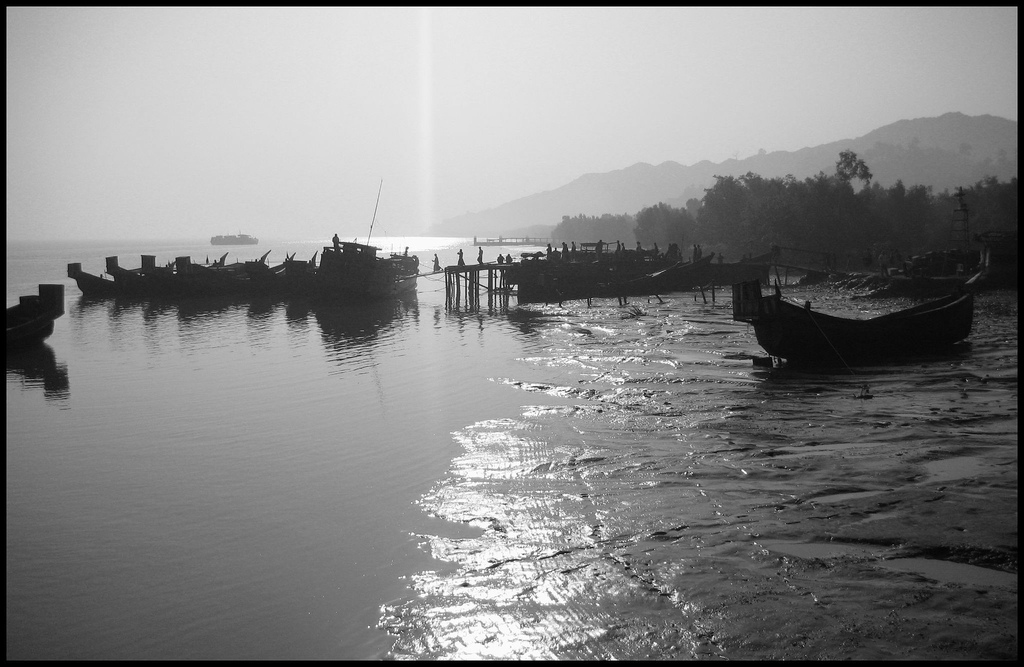
Teknaf port

Teknaf (Bengali: টেকনাফ Ṭeknaf) is an upazila of Cox's Bazar District in the Division of Chittagong, Bangladesh. It forms the southernmost point in mainland Bangladesh (St. Martin's Island is the southernmost point overall). The name of the region comes from the Naf River which forms the eastern boundary of the upazila. It shares a border with Myanmar, opposite the town of Maungdaw.

== Geography ==
Teknaf is located at 20.8667°N 92.3000°E. It has 23,675 households and a total area of 388.66 km^{2}. The tidal range at the Teknaf coastal area is strongly influenced by the Naf river estuary. The area has a warm tropical climate and sufficient rainfall to enable it to support wide biological diversity.

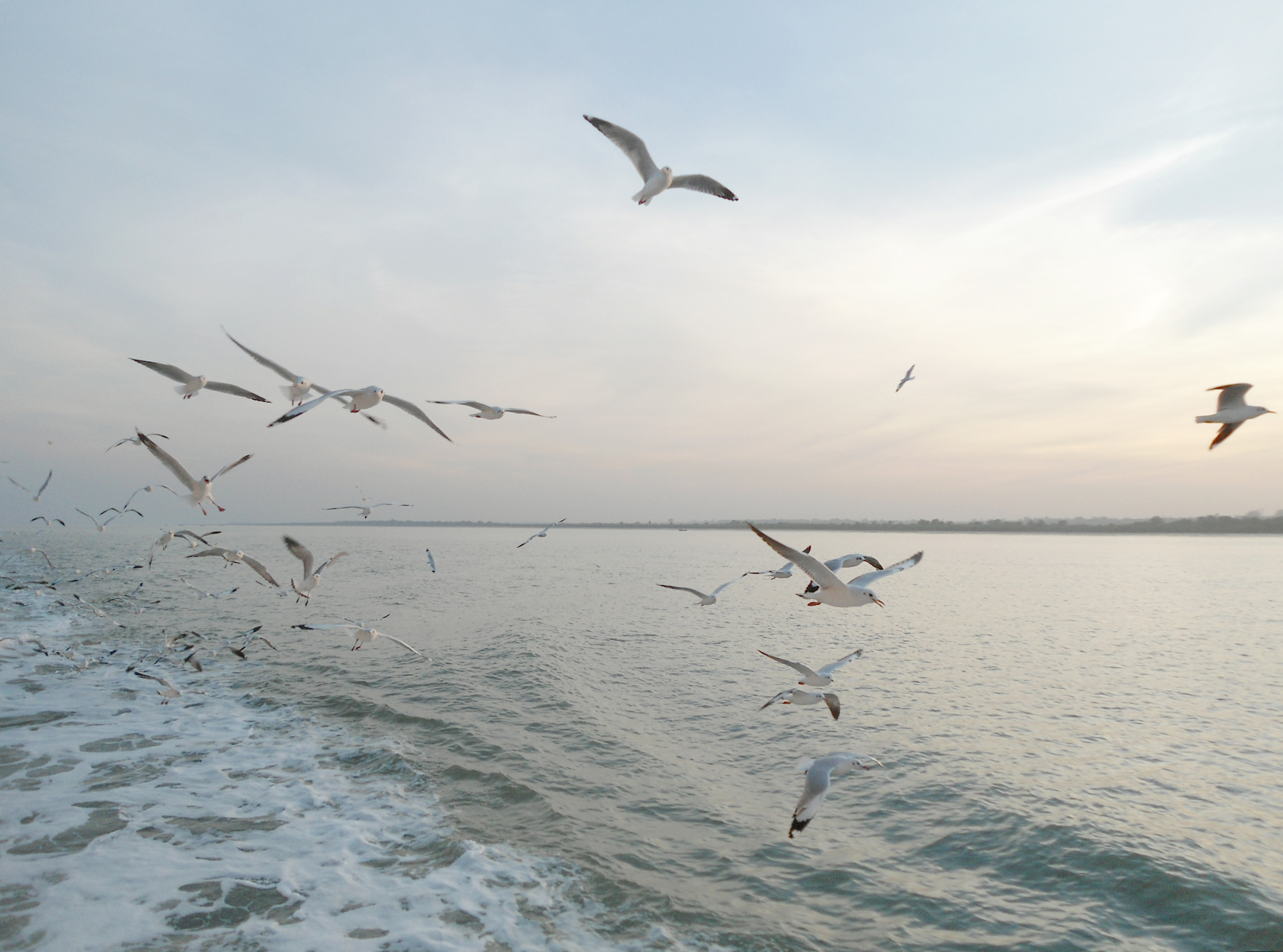
Sea Birds of Teknaf

Teknaf Peninsula is one of the longest sandy beach ecosystems (80 km) in the world. It represents a transitional ground for the fauna of the Indo-Himalayan and Indo-Malayan ecological sub-regions. Important habitats at the site include mangrove, mudflats, beaches and sand dunes, canals and lagoons and marine habitat. Mangrove forest occurs in Teknaf Peninsula both as natural forest with planted stands and mostly distributed in the inter-tidal zone. The Teknaf Peninsula mangroves support the habitat of 161 different species of fish. Teknaf Wildlife Sanctuary is one of the oldest reserved forests in Bangladesh.

== Climate ==
Teknaf has a tropical monsoon climate (Am) with very warm, dry winters and hot, extremely rainy summers.

Climate data for Teknaf
| Month | Jan | Feb | Mar | Apr | May | Jun | Jul | Aug | Sep | Oct | Nov | Dec | Year |
|---|---|---|---|---|---|---|---|---|---|---|---|---|---|
| Mean daily maximum °C (°F) | 27.2 (81.0) | 28.8 (83.8) | 30.8 (87.4) | 31.9 (89.4) | 32.1 (89.8) | 30.3 (86.5) | 29.8 (85.6) | 30.0 (86.0) | 30.7 (87.3) | 31.4 (88.5) | 30.2 (86.4) | 28.1 (82.6) | 30.1 (86.2) |
| Daily mean °C (°F) | 21.2 (70.2) | 23.0 (73.4) | 25.7 (78.3) | 27.8 (82.0) | 28.7 (83.7) | 27.8 (82.0) | 27.4 (81.3) | 27.5 (81.5) | 27.8 (82.0) | 27.7 (81.9) | 25.7 (78.3) | 22.6 (72.7) | 26.1 (78.9) |
| Mean daily minimum °C (°F) | 15.1 (59.2) | 17.1 (62.8) | 20.6 (69.1) | 23.9 (75.0) | 25.2 (77.4) | 25.2 (77.4) | 25.0 (77.0) | 24.9 (76.8) | 24.9 (76.8) | 24.0 (75.2) | 21.1 (70.0) | 17.0 (62.6) | 22.0 (71.6) |
| Average precipitation mm (inches) | 1.9 (0.07) | 16.5 (0.65) | 15.3 (0.60) | 73.0 (2.87) | 259.9 (10.23) | 968.1 (38.11) | 1,029.7 (40.54) | 898.9 (35.39) | 402.1 (15.83) | 207.4 (8.17) | 75.4 (2.97) | 5.9 (0.23) | 3,954.1 (155.66) |
| Average precipitation days | 1 | 2 | 2 | 5 | 12 | 21 | 25 | 24 | 15 | 8 | 4 | 1 | 120 |
| Average relative humidity (%) | 69 | 68 | 73 | 77 | 81 | 88 | 90 | 89 | 87 | 83 | 77 | 71 | 79 |
Source: Bangladesh Meteorological Department

== Demographics ==
Religions in Teknaf Upazila (2022)
| Religion | Percent |
| Islam | 97.48% |
| Buddhism | 1.34% |
| Hinduism | 1.15% |
| Other or not stated | 0.03% |

According to the 2022 Bangladeshi census, Teknaf Upazila had 66,564 households and a population of 333,865. 13.02% of the population were under 5 years of age. Teknaf had a literacy rate (age 7 and over) of 64.35%: 67.37% for males and 61.27% for females, and a sex ratio of 102.61 males for every 100 females. 208,941 (62.58%) lived in urban areas. Ethnic population is 4,010 (1.20%), of which 2,337 are Chakma.

According to the 1991 Bangladesh census, Teknaf had a population of 152,557. Males constituted 51.81% of the population, and females 48.19%. The population aged 18 or over was 64,417. Teknaf had an average literacy rate of 16.6% (7+ years), against the national average of 32.4%.

== Administration ==
Teknaf Upazila is divided into Teknaf Municipality and six union parishads: Baharchhara, Nhila, Sabrang, Saint Martin, Teknaf and Whykong. The union parishads are subdivided into 12 mauzas and 146 villages.

Teknaf Municipality is subdivided into 9 wards and 16 mahallas.

== Places of interest ==
- Teknaf Beach
- St. Martin Island
- Chhera Island
- Shapuree Island
- Jaliardwip
- Teknaf Wildlife Sanctuary
- Naf Tourism Park
- Naf River
- Teknaf Land Port
- Cox's Bazar–Teknaf Marine Drive
- Nayapara refugee camp
- Leda makeshift settlement

== Notable people ==
- AHA Gafur Chowdhury, Jatiya Party politician and MP
- Abdul Gani, politician and MP
- Mohammad Ali, Awami League politician and MP
- Abdur Rahman Bodi, Awami League politician, MP and drug kingpin
- Ilias Kobra, Bangladeshi film actor

== See also ==
- Cox's Bazar District topics
- List of Upazilas of Bangladesh
- Upazilas of Chittagong District
