= Leda makeshift settlement =

Refugee camp in Bangladesh

- Location in Bangladesh
- Coordinates: 20°58′21.414″N 92°14′38.476″E
- Country: Bangladesh
- Division: Chittagong Division
- District: Cox's Bazar District
- Upazila: Teknaf Upazila

Population (14 January 2018)
  - Total: 15,300 (main camp); 34,400 (extended area)

Leda makeshift settlement (Bengali: লেদা রোহিঙ্গা শিবির, romanized: Leda rohinga shibir, lit. 'Leda Rohingya Camp') is a refugee camp constructed for Rohingya refugees on government-owned land in Nhilla Union of the Teknaf sub-district in Cox's Bazar, Bangladesh. The camp is located some 15 km (9.3 mi) from Teknaf town.

== History ==
The UK-based charity Islamic Relief constructed the settlement on an area of 20 hectares (0.077 sq mi) in July 2008, and worked on providing residents with water and sanitation until the Government of Bangladesh asked it to withdraw in February 2010. Since then the camp site has been managed by the International Organization for Migration. The camp is governed by a Camp Management Committee composed of camp residents.

As of 14 January 2018, the population of refugees living within the original area of the Leda makeshift camp is 15,300. Another 34,400 are living in the extended camp area.

== Facilities ==
A ten-bed clinic run by IOM provides facility-based delivery services as well as basic emergency obstetric and newborn care. Various NGOs operating the camp also provide madrassas, drinking water, latrines, washrooms, desludging tanks and child friendly spaces. Leda has shops run by Bengali locals as well as Rohingya refugees.
