= Nhila Union =

Union of Cox's Bazar District, Chittagong, Bangladesh

Nhila হ্নীলা
- Union
- Nhila in Bangladesh
- Coordinates: 20°59′N 92°14.5′E
- Country: Bangladesh
- Division: Chittagong
- District: Cox's Bazar
- Upazila: Teknaf

Area
  - Total: 66.72 km^{2} (25.76 sq mi)

Population (2022)
  - Total: 62,468
  - Density: 936.3/km^{2} (2,425/sq mi)
- Time zone: UTC+6 (BST)
- Postal code: 4761

Nhila Union (also spelt "Nhilla Union" and "Hnila Union") is a union, the smallest administrative body of Bangladesh, located in Teknaf Upazila, Cox's Bazar District, Bangladesh.

== Demography ==
According to 2022 census, total population of the Union are 62,468. Among them, 60,129 are Muslim, 1500 are Hindu, 833 are Buddhist and 6 are others.

Religion-2022
1. Islam (96.3%)
2. Hinduism (2.40%)
3. Buddhism (1.33%)
4. Others (0.01%)

== Rohingya Camp ==
- Nayapara refugee camp
- Leda makeshift settlement
