= Shah Porir Dwip =

Island in Bangladesh

Shapuree Island
- Location within Bangladesh

Geography
- Location: Naf River, Bay of Bengal
- Coordinates: 20°44′N 92°20′E

Administration
- Bangladesh
- Division: Chittagong Division
- District: Cox's Bazar District
- Upazila: Teknaf Upazila

Demographics
- Languages: Bengali
- Ethnic groups: Bengalis

Shapuree, Shahpori, Shah Parir, Shapura, or Shinmabyu Island (Bengali: শাহপরী দ্বীপ, romanized: Sahapari Dwip; Burmese: ရှင်မဖြူကျွန်း) is an island in Bangladesh at the mouth of the Naf River, a maritime-boundary between Bangladesh and Myanmar.

== Etymology ==
According to some, the island was named by combining the name of Shah Shuja’s title "Shah" and his wife Pari Banu’s name "Pari".

== Geography ==
The island forms an extension of the peninsula of Teknaf Upazila.

== History ==
Historically, the island was claimed by the British during the First Anglo-Burmese War.

Recently, it has often been the landing place for boatloads of refugees crossing the Naf River from Myanmar, attempting to reach Bangladesh, as well as Bangladeshi border guards pushing the refugees attempting a crossing back into Myanmar.
