= Whykong Union =

Union of Cox's Bazar District, Chittagong, Bangladesh

Whykong হোয়াইক্যং
- Union
- Location within Bangladesh
- Country: Bangladesh
- Division: Chittagong Division
- District: Cox's Bazar District
- Upazila: Teknaf Upazila

Area
  - Total: 112.74 km^{2} (43.53 sq mi)

Population (2022)
  - Total: 67,091
  - Density: 595.09/km^{2} (1,541.3/sq mi)
- Time zone: UTC+6 (BST)
- Postal code: 4760
- Website: whykongup.coxsbazar.gov.bd/en

Whykong Union is a union of Teknaf Upazila under Cox's Bazar District.

== Demography ==
According to 2022 census, total population of the Union are 67,091. Among them, 63,722 are Muslim, 2,944 are Buddhist, 399 are Hindu and 26 are others.

Religion-2022
1. Islam (95.0%)
2. Buddhism (4.39%)
3. Hinduism (0.60%)
4. Others (0.03%)
