= Sabrang Union =

Union of Cox's Bazar District, Chittagong, Bangladesh

Sabrang Union সাবরাং ইউনিয়ন
- Union
- Interactive map of Sabrang Union
- Country: Bangladesh
- Division: Chittagong Division
- District: Cox's Bazar District
- Upazila: Teknaf Upazila

Area
  - Total: 63.06 km^{2} (24.35 sq mi)

Population (2022)
  - Total: 63,108
  - Density: 1,001/km^{2} (2,592/sq mi)
- Time zone: UTC+6 (BST)
- Postal code: 4760
- Website: subrangup.coxsbazar.gov.bd/en

Sabrang union is a union parishad of Teknaf Upazila under Cox's Bazar District.

== Demography ==
According to the 2022 census, the total population of the union is 63,108. Among them, 62,703 are Muslim, 386 are Hindu, 14 are Buddhist and 5 are others.

Religion-2022
1. Islam (99.4%)
2. Hinduism (0.61%)
3. Buddhism (0.02%)
4. Others (0.01%)

== Non-governmental organisations in Sabrang Union ==
Non-governmental organisations in Sabrang Union include MSF (Doctors without Borders), SHED (Society for Health Extension & Development), Brac, Pulse Bangladesh, Nacom, Muslim Aid, Uddipon, Rtm, Tai, Save the Children, IOM, Mukti Cox's Bazar, ACF, DRC, Ipsa, Codec, Aid Comilla, Caritas Bangladesh, and NRC.
