= Teknaf Land Port =

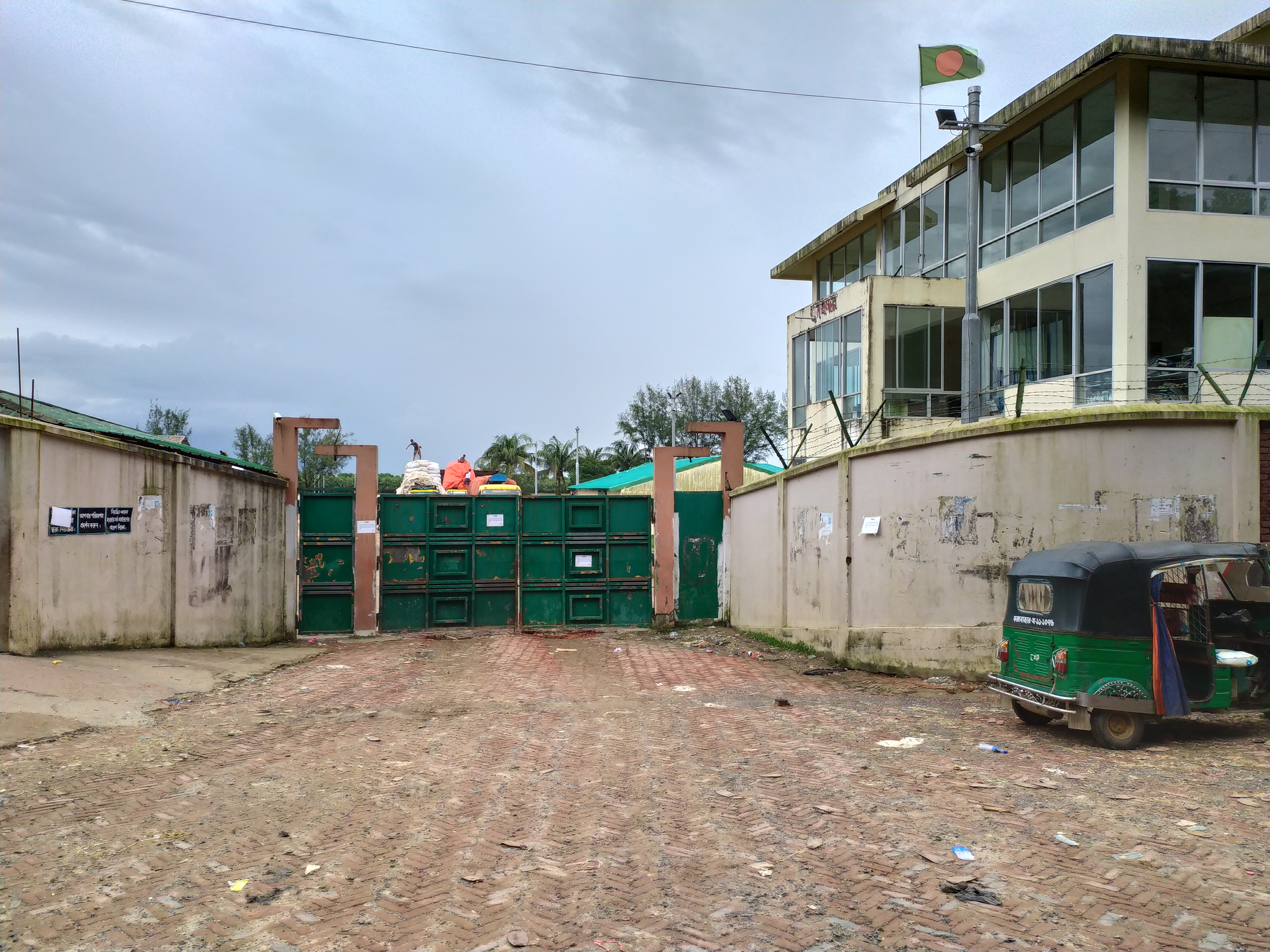
- Teknaf Land Port
- Interactive map of Teknaf Land Port
- Location within Bangladesh

Location
- Country: Bangladesh
- Location: Teknaf, Cox's Bazar
- Coordinates: 20.8647°N 92.3082°E

Details
- Opened: September 5, 1995; 31 years ago
- Type of Harbor: Dry port and river port

Teknaf Land Port aka Teknaf Port is one of the major ports in Bangladesh. It is located at Teknaf in Cox's Bazar District. The Myanmar side of the port is known as Maungdaw Port.

== History ==
In 5 September 1995, border trade opened. The Maungdaw-Teknaf border started as a customs station from both side by the Myanmar and Bangladesh.

In 2003 the Teknaf custom office was upgraded to Teknaf land Port. And in 2006, United Group took over the port under an agreement with the government of Bangladesh.

After the battle of Maungdaw during the Myanmar civil war, the trade at the port has remained suspended due to disruptions caused by the rebel group Arakan Army. Traders also allege that the group has established control over the Naf River, intercepting cargo vessels and demanding extortion payments. After a year in April 2026, Bangladesh has resumed operations at the port. State Minister for Shipping Razib Ahsan said the government and trade authorities, has begun efforts to resume border trade and cargo movement.
