= Baharchhara Union =

Union of Cox's Bazar District, Chittagong, Bangladesh

Baharchhara Union বাহারছড়া ইউনিয়ন
- Union
- Interactive map of Baharchhara Union
- Country: Bangladesh
- Division: Chittagong Division
- District: Cox's Bazar District
- Upazila: Teknaf Upazila

Area
  - Total: 15.31 km^{2} (5.91 sq mi)

Population (2022)
  - Total: 42,005
  - Density: 2,744/km^{2} (7,106/sq mi)
- Time zone: UTC+6 (BST)
- Postal code: 4760
- Website: baharcharaup.coxsbazar.gov.bd/en

Baharchhara Union is a Union of Teknaf Upazila under Cox's Bazar District.

== Demography ==
According to 2022 census, total population of the Union are 42,005. Among them, 41,433 are Muslim, 355 are Buddhist, 215 are Hindu and 2 are others.

Religion-2022
1. Islam (98.6%)
2. Buddhism (0.85%)
3. Hinduism (0.51%)
4. Others (0.00%)
