= Nayapara refugee camp =

Refugee camp in Chittagong Division, Bangladesh

Nayapara refugee camp নয়াপাড়া শরণার্থী শিবির
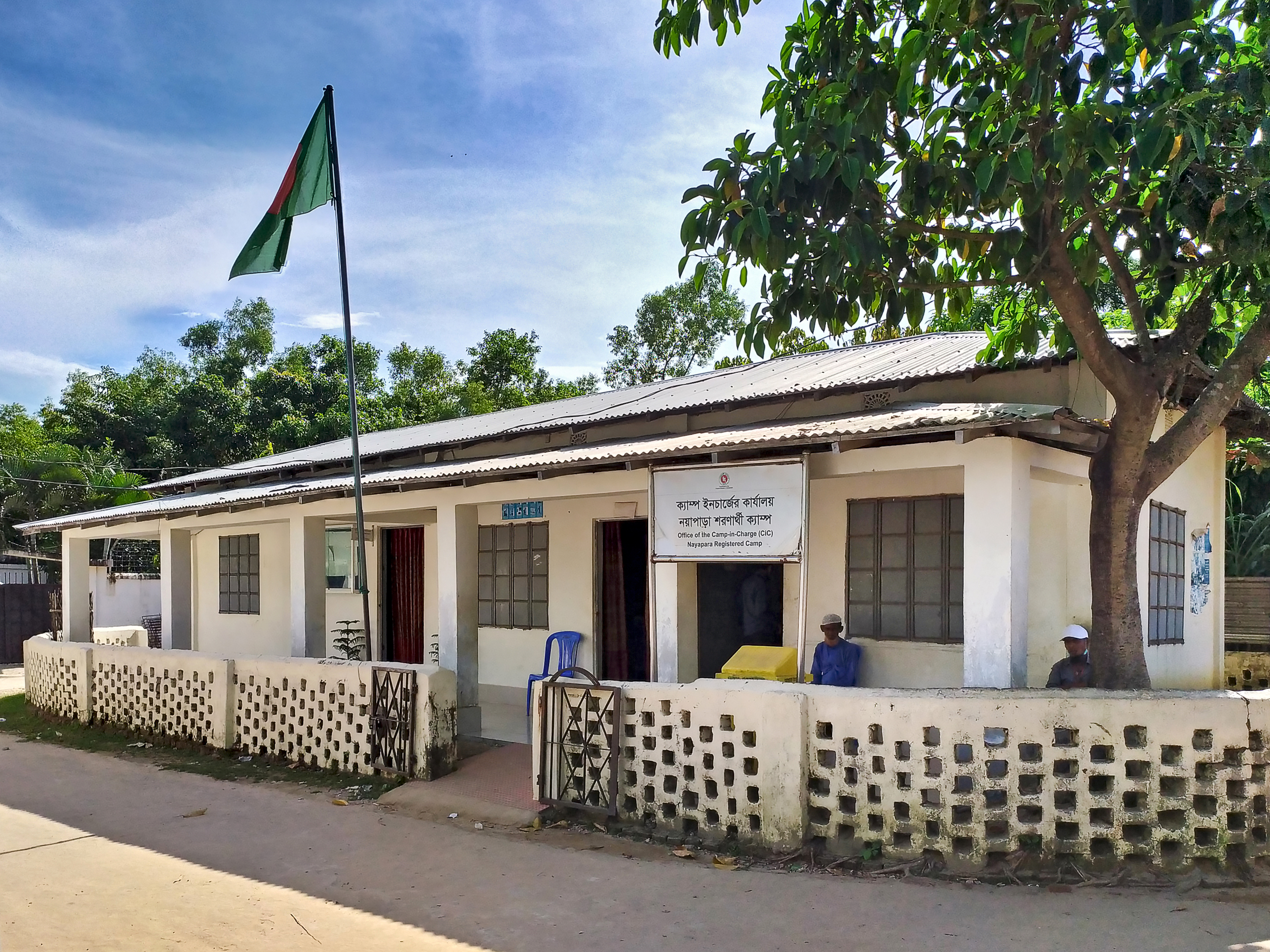
- Office of the Camp-in-Charge in Nayapara

- Location in Bangladesh
- Coordinates: 20.955979°N 92.251312°E
- Country: Bangladesh
- Division: Chittagong
- District: Cox's Bazar
- Upazila: Teknaf

Population (2024)
  - Total: 24,760

The Nayapara refugee camp (Bengali: নয়াপাড়া শরণার্থী শিবির, romanized: Noyapara shoronarthi shibir) is a refugee camp in Teknaf Upazila, Cox's Bazar District, Chittagong Division, Bangladesh. It is inhabited almost exclusively by Rohingya people who have fled from religious persecution in neighbouring Myanmar. It is one of two government-run refugee camps in Cox's Bazar District, the other being the larger Kutupalong refugee camp.

== Background ==
The Rohingya people, a predominantly Muslim ethnic minority in Myanmar, have historically been persecuted in the Buddhist-majority country. Militant attacks by Rohingya rebels in 2016 prompted a violent crackdown on Rohingyas by the Myanmar military, the Tatmadaw. Consequently, hundreds of thousands of Rohingyas fled across the border to Cox's Bazar District, Bangladesh, settling mainly in two government-run refugee camps, Nayapara and Kutupalong, which have since become one of the densest places in the world.

== Demographics ==
The Nayapara and Kutupalong refugee camps had a combined population of around 30,000 refugees in July 2017, almost all of whom were Rohingyas. The United Nations High Commissioner for Refugees (UNHCR) estimated that the combined population of the two refugee camps had increased to over 77,000 by September 2017. On 14 January 2018, the estimated population of Nayapara refugee camp was 23,065. The UNHCR recorded a population of 24,760 in the Nayapara refugee camp on 31 July 2024.

== 2021 fire ==
On 14 January 2021, a fire in the camp destroyed around 550 shelters, 150 shops, and a community center, resulting in the loss of homes and belongings of 3,500 Rohingya refugees. The UN World Food Programme, Inter Sector Coordination Group, and Bangladesh Red Crescent were among the organizations offering assistance to victims.
