= Teknaf Sadar Union =

Union of Cox's Bazar District, Chittagong, Bangladesh

Teknaf Sadar Union টেকনাফ সদর ইউনিয়ন
- Union
- Interactive map of Teknaf Sadar Union
- Country: Bangladesh
- Division: Chittagong Division
- District: Cox's Bazar District
- Upazila: Teknaf Upazila

Area
  - Total: 106.16 km^{2} (40.99 sq mi)

Population (2022)
  - Total: 64,453
  - Density: 607.13/km^{2} (1,572.5/sq mi)
- Time zone: UTC+6 (BST)
- Postal code: 4760
- Website: teknafsadarup.coxsbazar.gov.bd

Teknaf sadar union is a Union of Teknaf Upazila under Cox's Bazar District.

== Demography ==
According to 2022 census, total population of the Union are 64,448. Among them, 63,712 are Muslim, 698 are Hindu, 27 are Buddhist and 11 are others.

Religion-2022
1. Islam (98.9%)
2. Hinduism (1.08%)
3. Buddhism (0.04%)
4. Others (0.02%)
