= Naf River =

River between Bangladesh and Myanmar

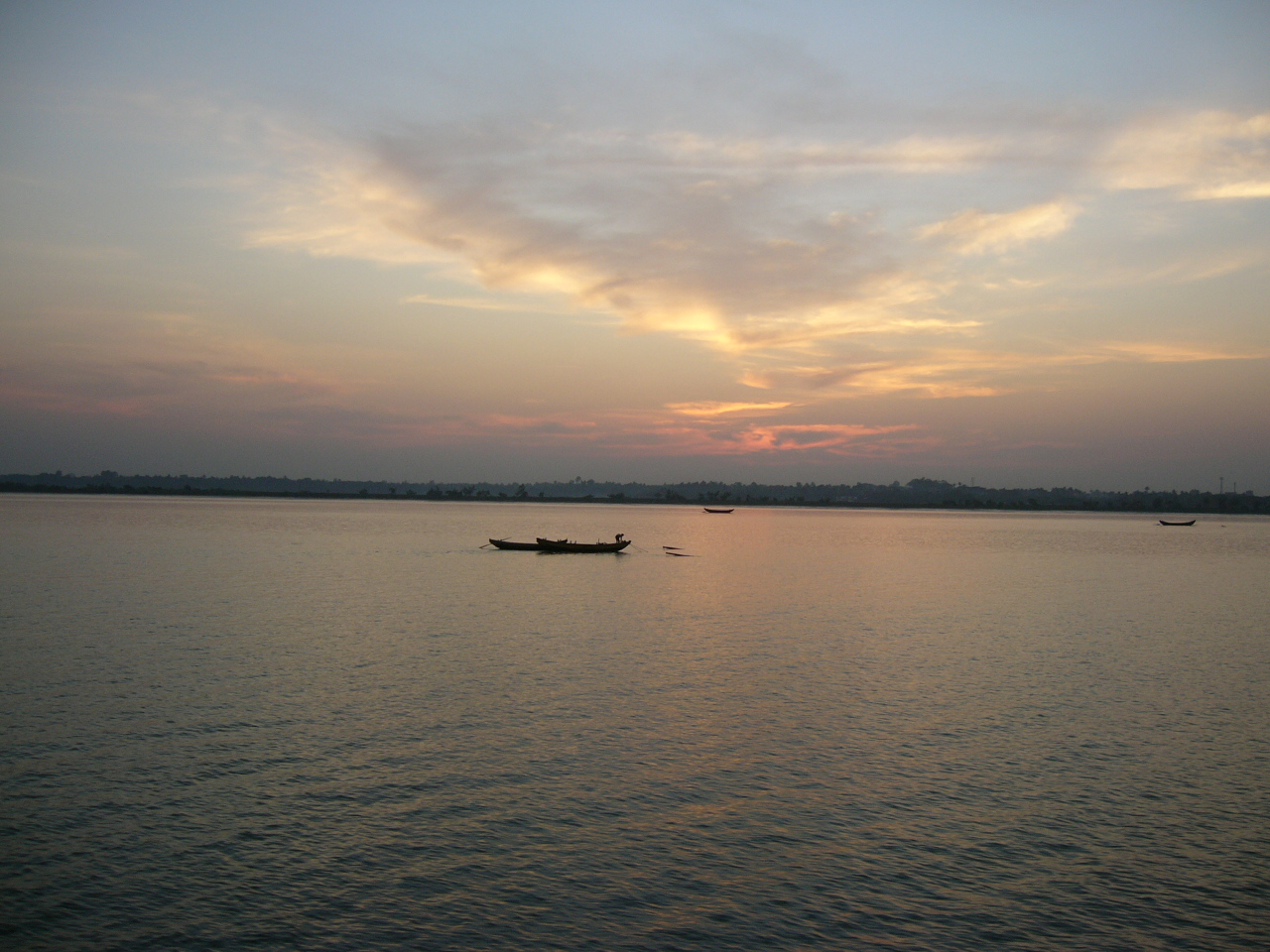

Location
- Country: Bangladesh and Myanmar
- Division/State: Chittagong Division(Bangladesh) Rakhine State(Myanmar)
- Districts: Cox's Bazar District (Bangladesh) Maungdaw District(Myanmar)
- City: Teknaf(Bangladesh) Maungdaw(Myanmar)

Physical characteristics
- Mouth
  - location: Bay of Bengal
  - coordinates: 20°43′N 92°22′E
- Depth
  - average: 128 feet (39 m)
  - maximum: 400 feet (120 m)

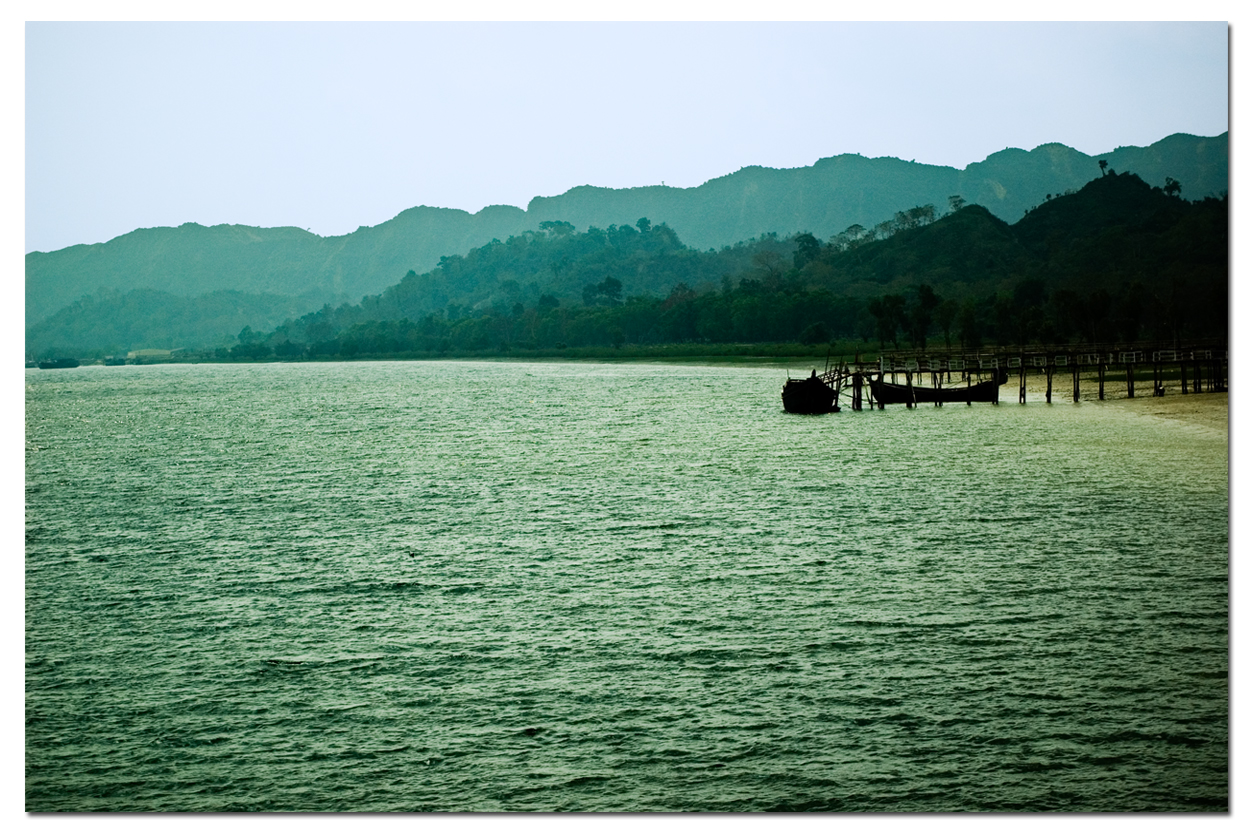
Naf River at Teknaf Upazila, Bangladesh.

The Naf River (Bengali: নাফ নদী Naf Nodi IPA: [naf nod̪i]; Burmese: နတ်မြစ် [naʔ mjɪʔ]; Rakhine: နတ်မြစ် [nɛ́ mràɪʔ]) is an international river marking part of the border of southeastern Bangladesh and northwestern Myanmar.

== Geography ==
The Naf's average depth is 128 feet (39 m), and maximum depth is 400 feet (120 m). Its width varies from 1.61 km to 3.22 km.

It flows into the Bay of Bengal in the Indian Ocean, between the Bangladeshi Cox's Bazar District of the Chittagong Division, and the Burmese Rakhine State.

Historically, Shapuree Island, located at the mouth of the river, has played an important role territorially. It is considered one of the immediate causes for the first Anglo-Burmese War. St. Martin's Island is also at the river's mouth.

== Incidents ==
Regular incidents in which fishermen and Burmese refugees are shot at by the Tatmadaw (Myanmar Armed Forces), and/or refugees fleeing Myanmar are escorted back to Myanmar by Bangladeshi troops have occurred on the Naf River.
These include but are not limited to the following:

- February 1992 — The Lun Htin, A Burmese paramilitary force killed 20 refugees who were crossing the Naf River into Bangladesh.
- 24 March 1994 — Members of the Myanmar Army's Western Military Command patrolling the Naf River found a group of Rohingya Muslims fishing in a small country boat. The soldiers tried to extort money from the fishermen, but when they were unable to do so, tied them up with rope and brought them to Balu Khali village in Maungdaw Township. Eight of the Rohingya fishermen were interrogated and tortured for five days, and then they were all shot by firing squad.
- 8 January 2000 — a three-day skirmish between Bangladeshi and Myanmar border guards amid rising tension over a controversial dam project by Myanmar.
- 27 October 2001 — Burmese border troops killed one Bangladeshi man, wounded 2, and abducted 13 while they were fishing in the Naf River.
- 22 January 2005 — 70 people were shot and killed when Burmese border guards opened fire on a group of 50 boats attempting to cross the Naf River. The border guards claimed that they believed the boats contained "smuggled rice," implying that their actions, culminating in the mass shooting of unarmed people, were justified.
- June 2012 — thousands of Rohingya Muslims fleeing sectarian violence in Rakhine State sought refuge across the Naf River in the Chittagong Division of Bangladesh, though they were often escorted back by Bangladeshi troops. On 11 July 2012, Burmese President Thein Sein suggested expelling the Rohingya people from Myanmar or having the UN relocate the 300,000 Rohingya people living in Myanmar, a policy the UN quickly rejected.
- August 2017 — The Border Guard Bangladesh station chief of the Ghumdum border post in Bangladesh accused Myanmar's military of firing on fleeing Rohingyas crossing the Naf River. An AFP reporter counted more than a dozen mortar shells and several heavy machine gun rounds fired by Burmese security forces on the fleeing Rohingyas.

=== Abduction of fishermen by Arakan Army ===
Since December 8, 2024, when the Arakan Army took control of Maungdaw and the Myanmar side of the border, reports indicate that at least 399 fishermen have been captured by Arakan Army. As of mid-May 2026, around 165 reportedly remains in Arakan Army custody. According to the Daily Star, Bangladeshi and Rohingya fishermen have been held in camps under difficult conditions. Families of detainees has reported requested payments of often between Tk 100,000 and Tk 150,000 per person through mobile financial services in exchange for their release.

== See also ==
- List of international border rivers
- List of rivers in Bangladesh
- Rohingya refugees in Bangladesh
