= Teknaf =

Southernmost town of Bangladesh

Teknaf টেকনাফ
- Municipality
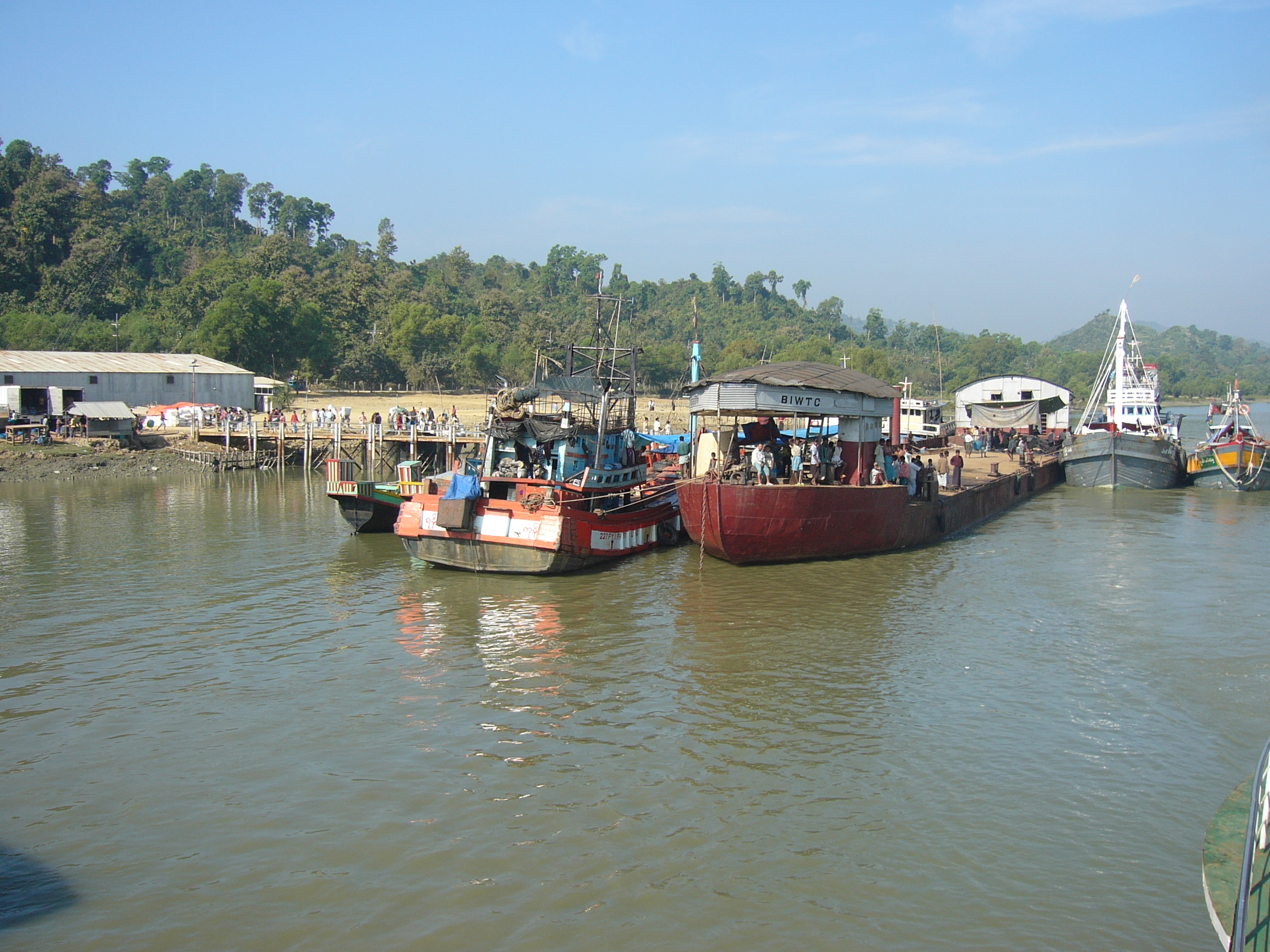
- Teknaf launch station

- Location in Bangladesh
- Coordinates: 20°52′05″N 92°17′54″E
- Country: Bangladesh
- Division: Chittagong
- District: Cox's Bazar
- Upazila: Teknaf

Population
  - Total: 25,056
- Time zone: UTC+6 (BST)

Teknaf (Bengali: টেকনাফ) is a municipality of Teknaf Upazila of Cox's Bazar District in south-eastern Bangladesh. It forms the southernmost point in mainland Bangladesh (St. Martin's Island is the southernmost point).

The name of the region comes from the Naf River which forms the eastern boundary of the upazila and is the boundary between Bangladesh and Myanmar. Teknaf port is used to trade with Myanmar.

== History ==
The earliest known inhabitants of Teknaf were the Rakhine people, who referred to the area as Kawau Sang.

In October 2017, seven Detective Branch officers kidnapped the brother of Teknaf mayor Moniruzzaman and demanded a ransom for his freedom. After being released, the victim's family filed a complaint with the Bangladesh Army check post which detained the officers with the ransom money.

In May 2018, Ekramul Haque, councillor of Teknaf Municipality Ward three, was killed by a unit of Rapid Action Battalion. He was elected as councilor in Teknaf Municipality three times in a row as a candidate of Awami League. On 10 December 2021, the United States approved sanctions against seven current and former officers of Rapid Action Battalion under the Magnitsky Act, the first Bangladeshi officials to face sanctions under the act, for the killing of Ekramul Haque.

== Administration and demographics ==
Teknaf municipality has nine wards and 16 Mahallas.

Teknaf has a population of 25,056 and a literacy rate of 40.9%.

== See also ==
- Cox's Bazar District
- St. Martin's Island
- Naf River
