= Cox's Bazar District =

District of Bangladesh

Cox's Bazar District কক্সবাজার জেলা
- District of Bangladesh
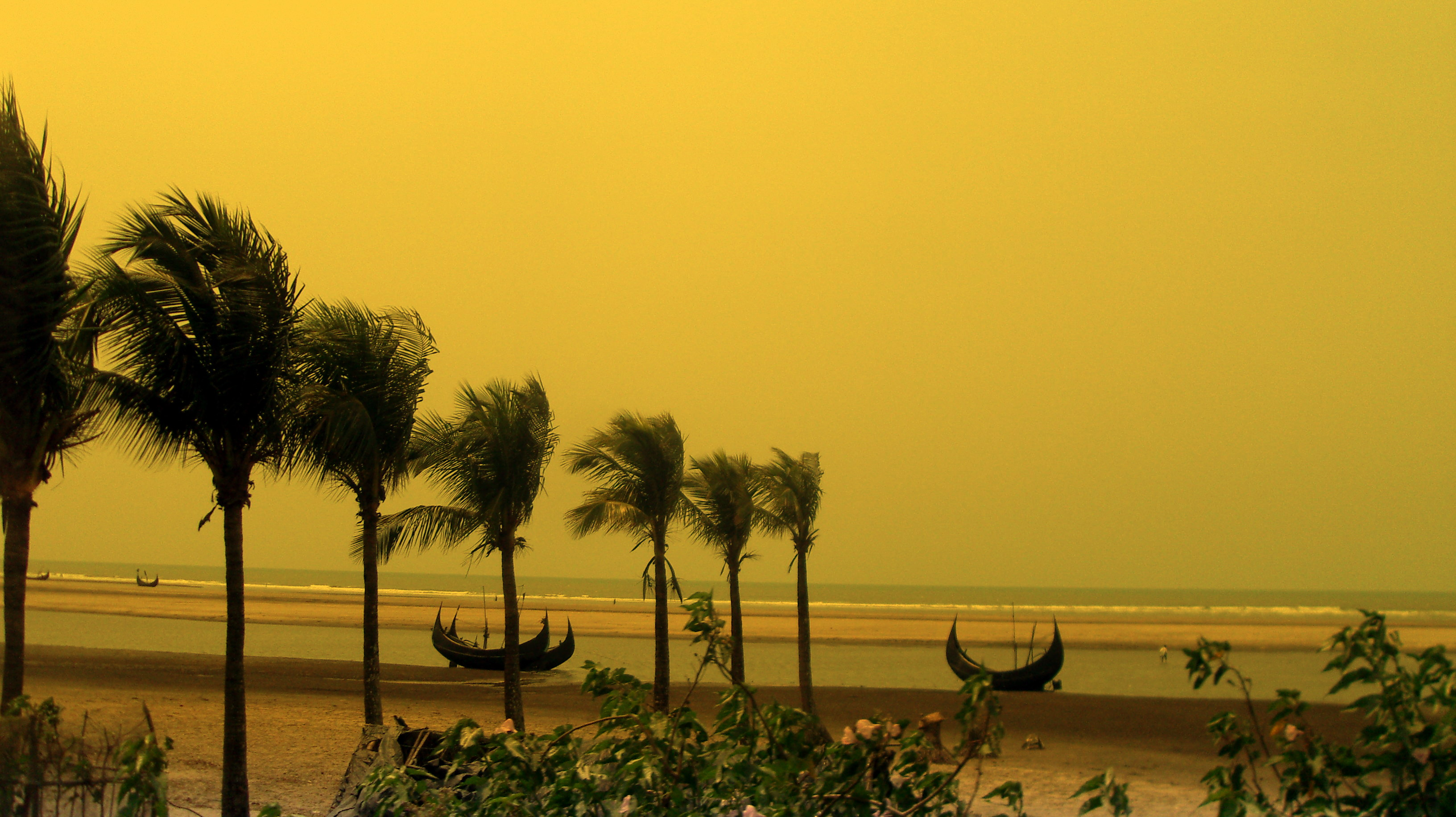
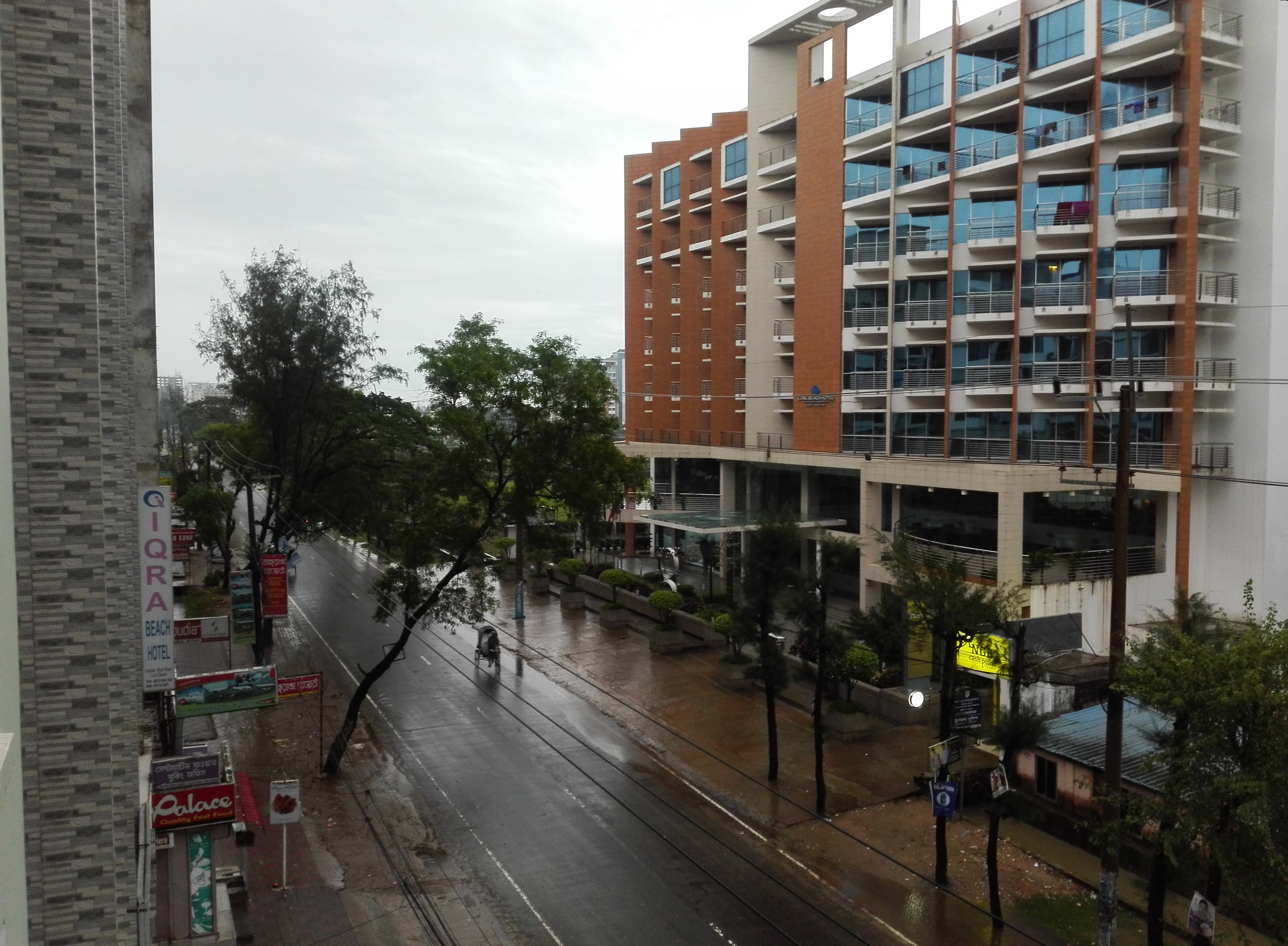
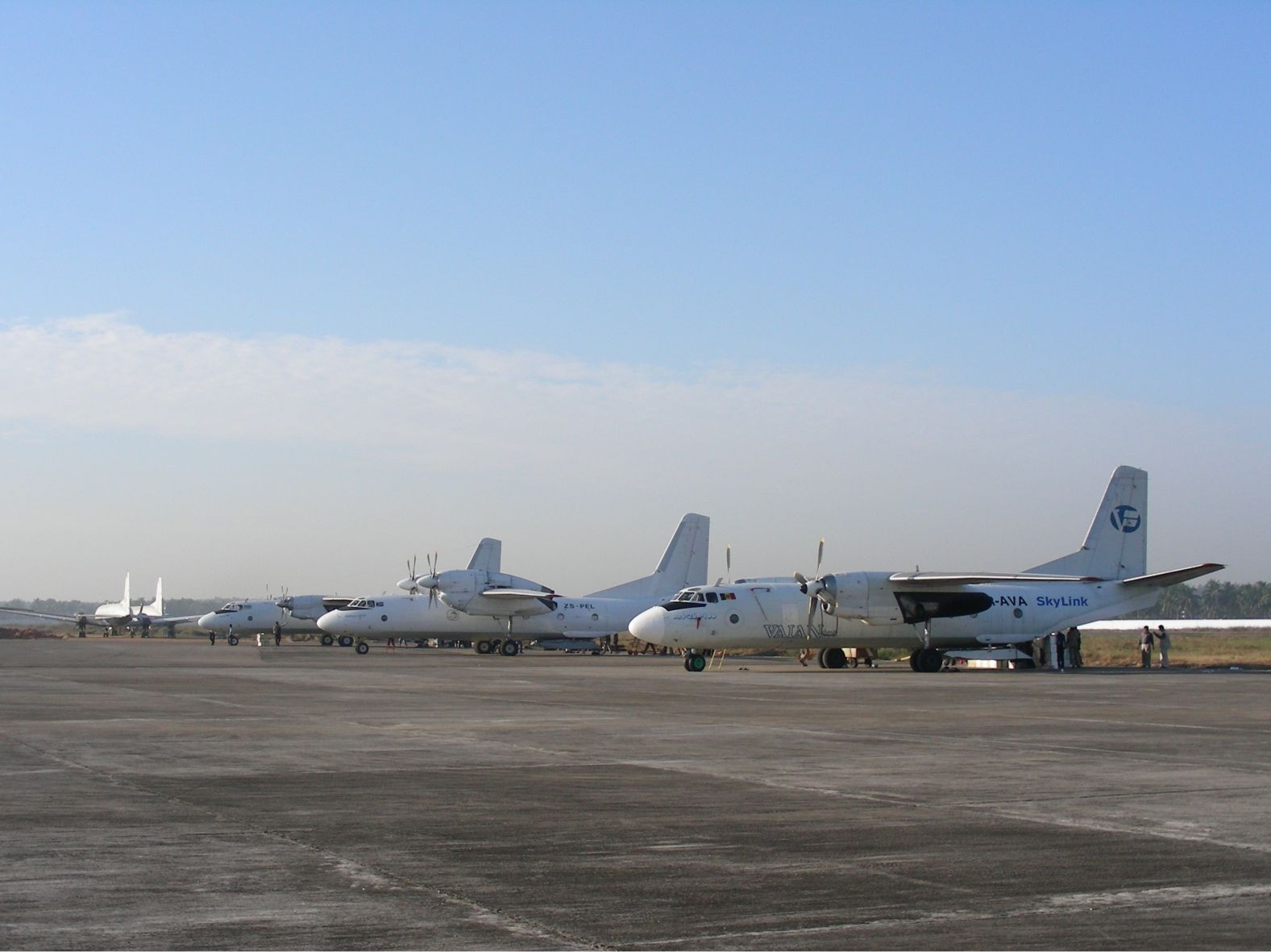
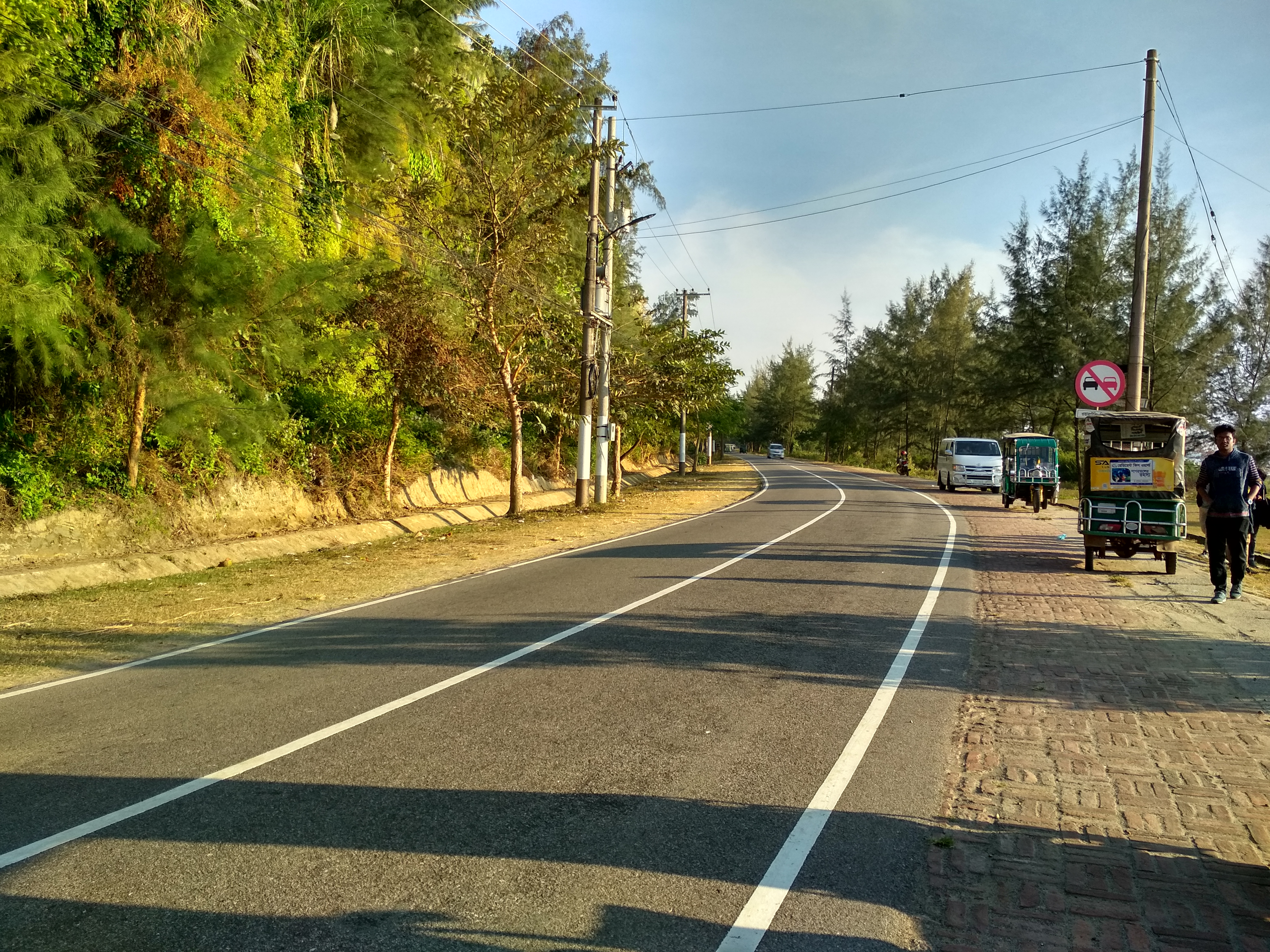
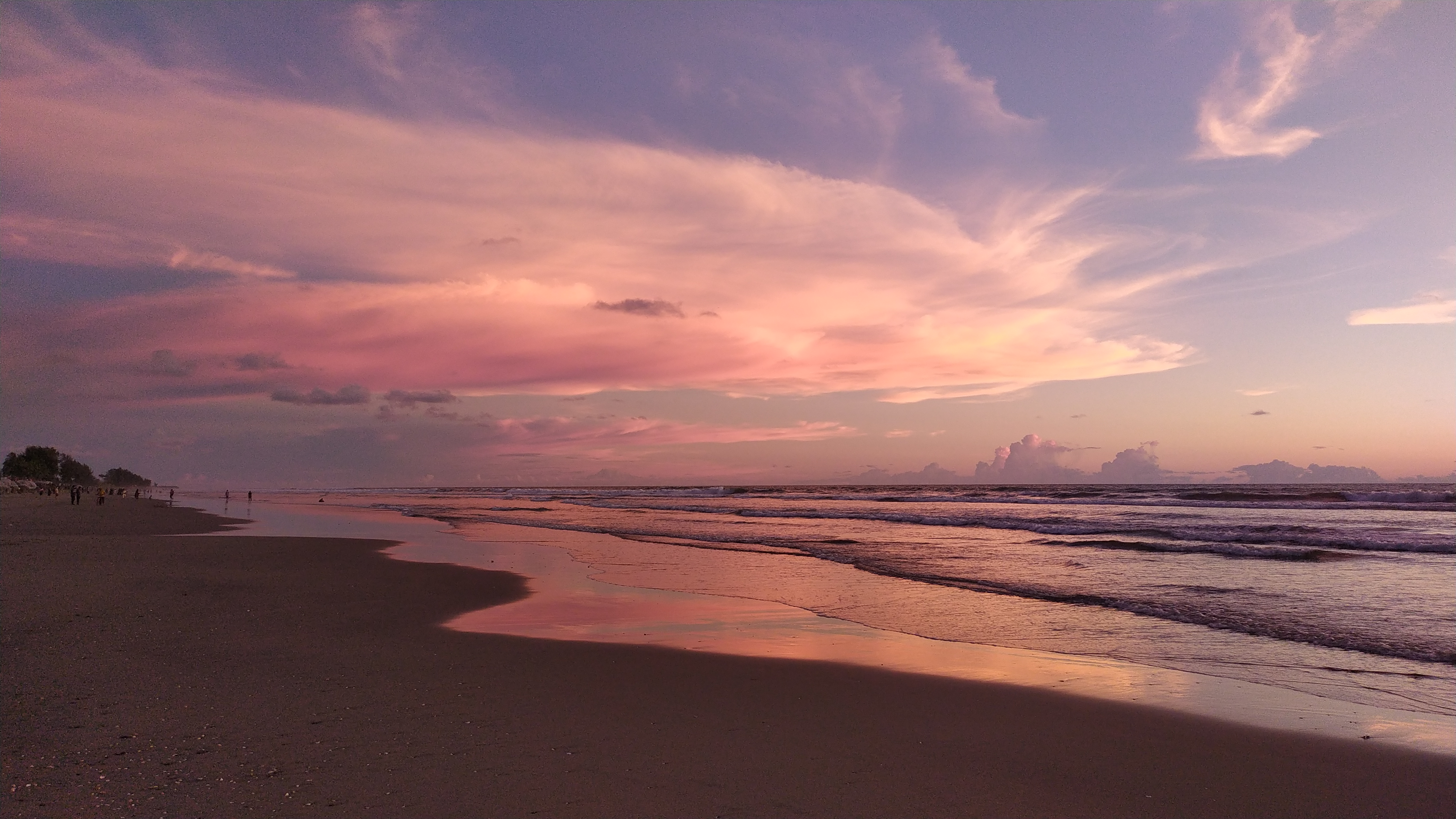
- Clockwise from top-left: Cox’s Bazar sea beach, Railway station, Marine drive road, Teknaf Beach, Cox’s Bazar Airport and Hotel-Motel zone

- Location of Cox's Bazar District within Bangladesh
- Interactive map of Cox's Bazar District
- Coordinates: 21.25°N 92.10°E
- Country: Bangladesh
- Division: Chittagong Division

Area
  - Total: 2,491.85 km^{2} (962.11 sq mi)

Population (2022)
  - Total: 2,823,268
  - Density: 1,133.00/km^{2} (2,934.46/sq mi)
- Time zone: UTC+06:00 (BST)
- Postal code: 4700
- Area code: 0341
- ISO 3166 code: BD-11
- HDI (2019): 0.574 medium · 19th of 20
- Website: www.coxsbazar.gov.bd

Cox's Bazar District (Bengali: কক্সবাজার জেলা) is a district in the Chittagong Division of Bangladesh. It is named after the town of Cox's Bazar. It is located 150 kilometres (93 mi) south of Chittagong. Cox's Bazar is also known by the names Panowa ("yellow flower") and Palongkee. The modern Cox's Bazar derives its name from Captain Hiram Cox (died 1799), an army officer who served in British India. It is one of the fishing ports of Bangladesh, and contains one of the world's longest natural sea beaches (120 kilometres (75 mi) long including mud flats).

In 1984 during the Ershad regime, Cox's Bazar district was established by dividing Chittagong District. Today, Cox's Bazar is a major tourist destination within Bangladesh.

== Geography ==
Cox's Bazar District has an area of 2,491.86 km^{2} (962.11 sq mi). It is bounded by Chittagong District on the north, Bay of Bengal in the south, Bandarban District on the east, and the Bay of Bengal on the west. Major rivers include Matamuhuri, Bakkhali, Reju Khal, Naf River, Maheshkhali channel and Kutubdia channel. The area of the city of Cox's Bazar is 6.85 km^{2} (2.64 sq mi).

== History ==
The known history of Cox's Bazar begins in the Mughal period. On his way to Arakan, when the Mughal Prince Shah Shuja (1616–1660) passed through the hilly terrain of the present day Cox's Bazar, he was attracted to the scenic nature of the region. He commanded his forces to camp there. A place named Dulahazara, meaning "one thousand palanquins", still exists in the area.

Cox's Bazar is named after Captain Hiram Cox, an officer of the East India Company, who was assigned with the charges of the current day Cox's Bazar and its adjacent areas. The town of Cox's Bazar was established in 1799 as a market town to honour Captain Cox. In 1854, Cox's Bazar was made a Sub Divisional headquarters of Chittagong district under the Bengal Presidency of British India.

After the end of British rule in 1947, Cox's Bazar remained a part of East Pakistan under Pakistan until 1971. Captain Advocate Fazlul Karim was the first chairman of Cox's Bazar municipality following independence from the British. He established the Tamarisk Forest along the beach to draw tourism to the town and to protect the beach from the tide. He donated many of his father-in-law's and his own lands to establish a public library and town hall. In 1971, the wharf was used as a naval port by the Pakistan Navy's gunboats. This and the nearby airstrip of the Pakistan Air Force were the scene of intense shelling by the Indian Navy during the Bangladesh War of Independence in 1971.

In the year 1984, Cox's Bazar was upgraded into a District from a Sub Division under the Chittagong Division.

Starting in 2017, a "mass human exodus" of the Rohingya Muslim minority group from neighboring Myanmar's Rakhine State has led to Cox's Bazar housing the "world's largest refugee settlement" over the following years. In the first year, the UNHCR estimated that 725,000 refugees had sought safety in Bangladesh.

== Upazila (Subdivisions) ==
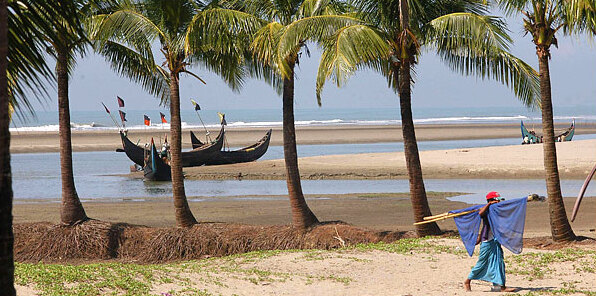
Inani Beach

There are ten upazilas under this district, namely:

1. Cox's Bazar Sadar Upazila
2. Chakaria Upazila
3. Teknaf Upazila
4. Maheshkhali Upazila
5. Kutubdia Upazila
6. Ramu Upazila
7. Ukhia Upazila
8. Pekua Upazila
9. Eidgaon Upazila
10. Matamuhuri Upazila

== Education ==
- Cox's Bazar Medical College
- Cox's Bazar International University
- Cox's Bazar Polytechnic Institute
- Cox's Bazar Government College
- Cox's Bazar Govt. Women College
- Cox's Bazar Government High School
- Cox's Bazar Government Girls High School
- Cox's Bazar City College
- Cox's Bazar International University
- Cox's Bazar Commerce College
- Cox's Bazar Harvard College
- Chakaria College
- Dulahazara Degree College
- Ramu College

== Climate ==
The annual average temperature in Cox's Bazar is 32.8 °C (91.0 °F) and a minimum of 16.1 °C (61.0 °F). The climate remains hot and humid with some seasons of temperate weather. The average amount of rainfall is 4,285 mm (168.7 in).

== Demographics ==
Historical population
Year	Pop.	±% p.a.
1974	809,310	—
1981	1,026,172	+3.45%
1991	1,419,260	+3.30%
2001	1,773,709	+2.25%
2011	2,289,990	+2.59%
2022	2,823,268	+1.92%

According to the 2022 Census of Bangladesh, Cox's Bazar District had 587,114 households and a population of 2,823,268 with an average of 4.75 people per household. Among the population, 671,286 (23.78%) of the inhabitants were under 10 years of age. The population density was 1,133 people per km^{2}. Cox's Bazar District had a literacy rate (age 7 and over) of 71.58%, compared to the national average of 74.80%, and a sex ratio of 103.32 males per 100 females. Approximately 43.62% (1,231,639) of the population lived in urban areas. The ethnic population was 14,881 (0.64%), mainly Rakhine with some Chakma and Tanchangya.

Religions in Cox's Bazar District (2022)
Religion	Percent
Islam	94.57%
Hinduism	3.83%
Buddhism	1.50%
Other or not stated	0.10%

Religion	1941		1981		1991		2001		2011		2022	
Religion	Pop.	%	Pop.	%	Pop.	%	Pop.	%	Pop.	%	Pop.	%
Islam	342,378	86.22%	941,630	91.76%	1307467	92.13%	1,648,211	92.92%	2151958	93.97%	2,669,977	94.57%
Hinduism	26,907	6.78%	58,974	5.75%	79,499	5.60%	87,123	4.91%	97,648	4.26%	108,166	3.83%
Buddhism	—N/a	—N/a	24,011	2.34%	30,853	2.17%	35,737	2.01%	37,822	1.65%	42,305	1.50%
Others (Note: Including Jainism, Christianity, Buddhism, Zoroastrianism, Judaism, Ad-Dharmis, or not stated)	27,828	7.00%	1,557	0.15%	1,441	0.10%	2,638	0.16%	2,562	0.12%	2,820	0.10%
Total Population	397,113	100%	1,026,172	100%	1,419,260	100%	1,773,709	100%	2,289,990	100%	2,823,268	100%

Muslims are the largest religious community. Prior to Partition, the southern upazilas of Ukhiya and Teknaf had a large ethnic Buddhist Rakhine population, but most have moved to the Rakhine state in Myanmar over the years. The local dialect is Chittagonian as well as presence of many Rohingya speakers due to the massive refugee camps.

== Economy ==
The most significant livelihood of Cox's Bazar district is tourism. Millions of foreign and Bangladeshi natives visit this coastal city every year. A number of hotels, guest houses, and motels have been built in the city and coastal region and the hospitality industry is a major employer in the area.

A number of people are involved in the fishing and collection of seafoods, sea products and salt-farming. Oysters, snails, pearls and jewelry made from shells are popular with the tourists in the seaside and city stores. A number of people are also employed by the transportation business for tourists. Additionally, many people of the district are farmers.

In 2002, a surfing club was initiated at Cox's Bazar by a local Bangladeshi. It has now extended to holding an annual competition including locals and foreign tourists. This is the first surfing initiative in Bangladesh's history.

== Places of interest ==
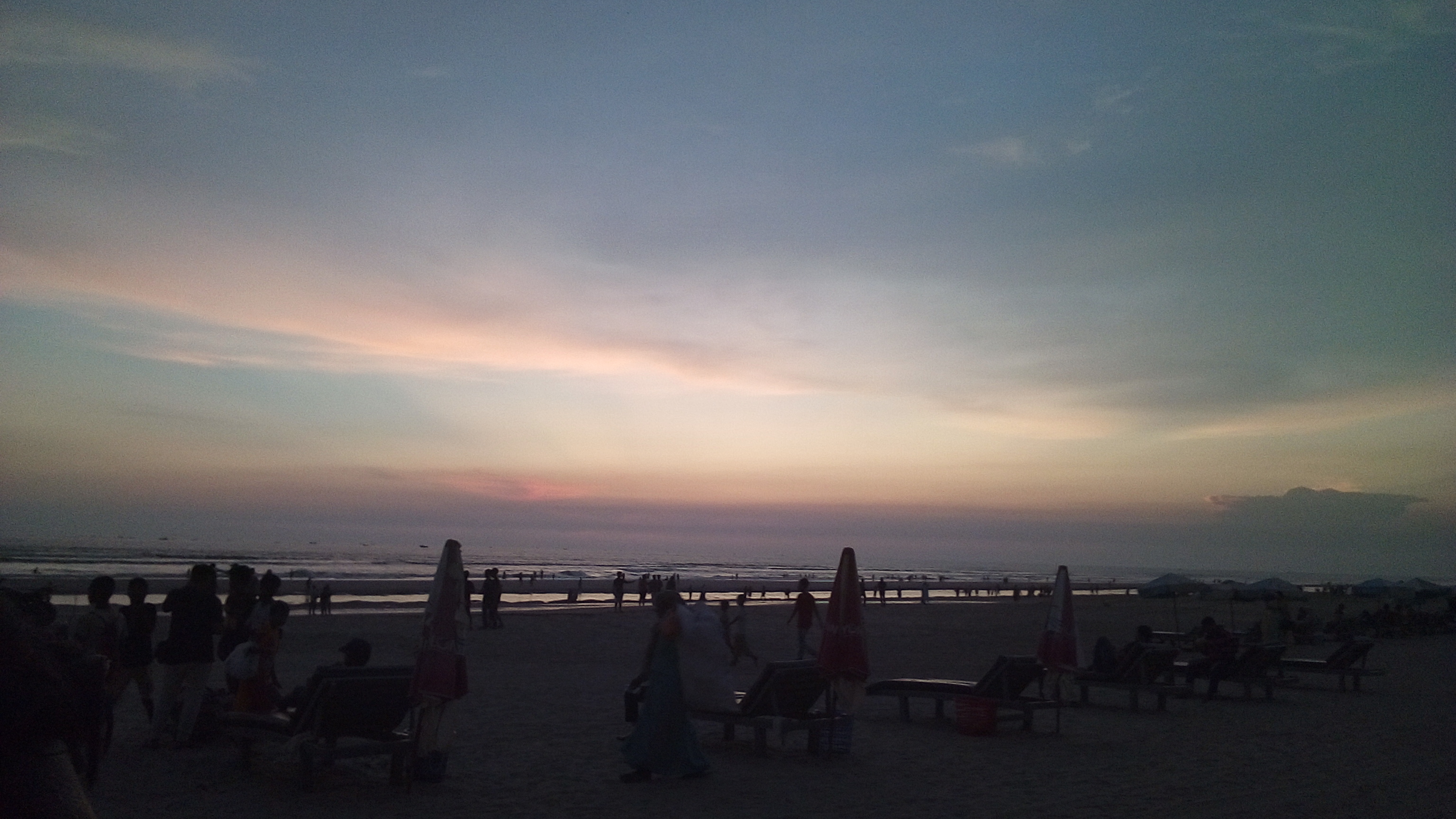
Cox's Bazar (Kolatoli Sea Beach) after sunset

- Cox's Bazar Beach
- Inani Beach
- Teknaf Beach

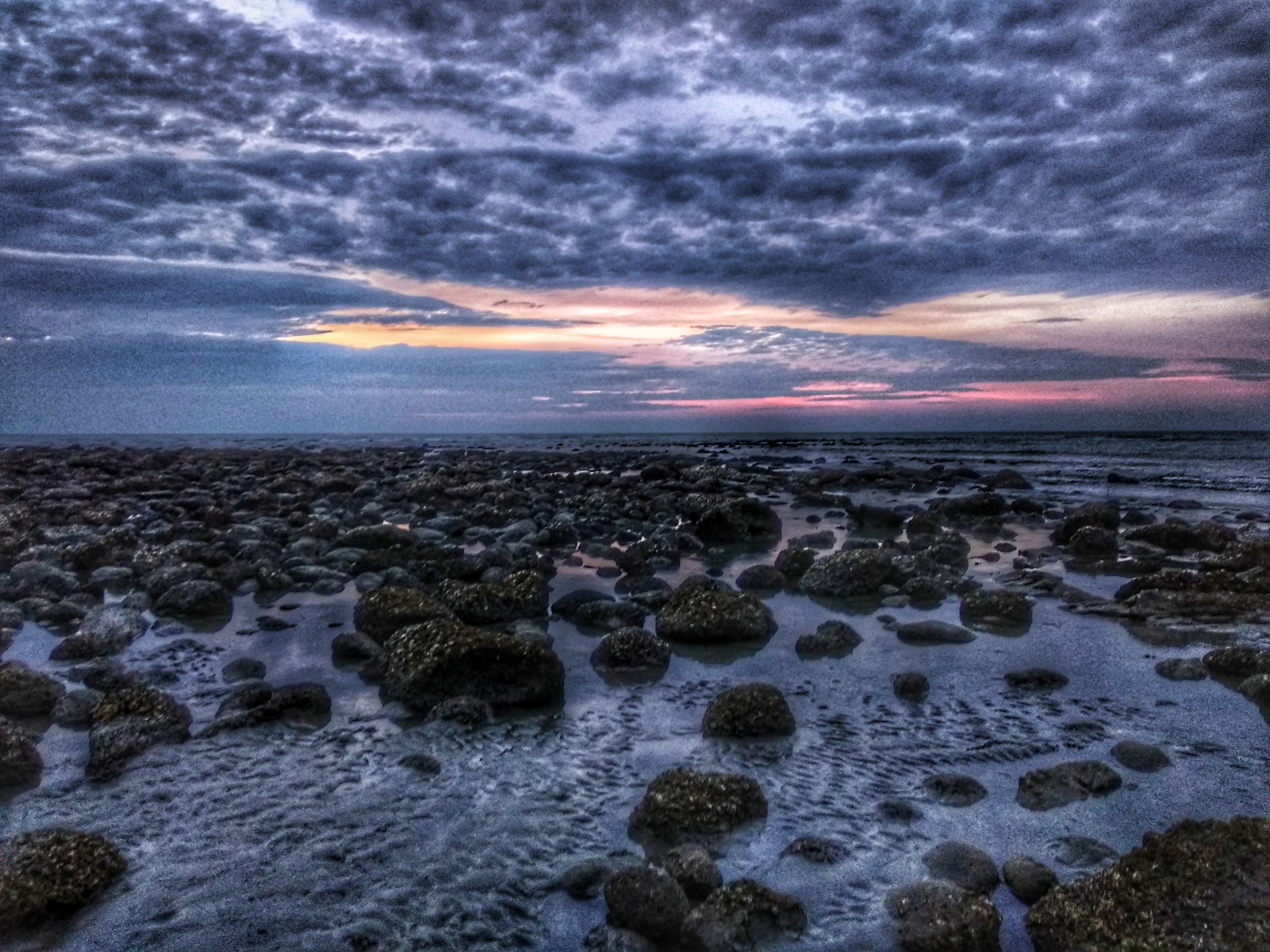
St. Martin's Island

- Kutubdia Beach
- St. Martin's Island, the only coral island in Bangladesh, is situated at 9 km (5.6 mi) south of Teknaf. It is a tourist spot.
- Chhera Island
- Maheshkhali Island
- Matarbari Island
- Sonadia Island
- Kutubdia Dwip
- Shah Porir Dwip
- Jaliardwip
- Naf Tourism Park
- Dulhazra Safari Park, a safari park in Bangladesh which is situated at Chakaria Upazila. It has a range of exotic animals such as birds, snakes, and water beasts.

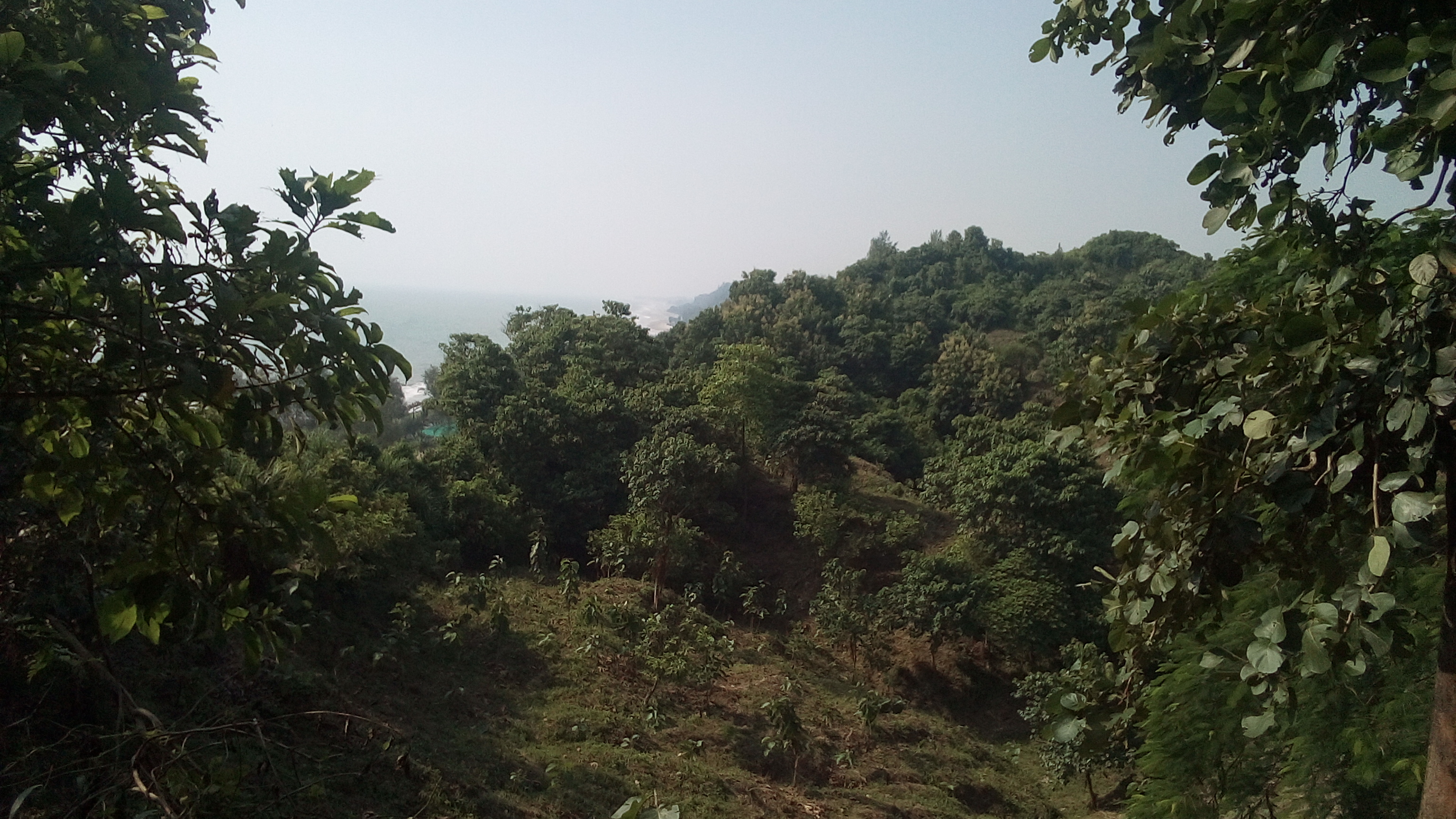
Himchori from top

- Himchari National Park, located about 8 km (5 mi) south of Cox's Bazar, is a picnic spot with waterfalls and hill top from where views of the sea can be seen. Birds and terrestrial animals roam near the road.
- Medhakachhapia National Park
- Inani National Park
- Fasiakhali Wildlife Sanctuary
- Teknaf Wildlife Sanctuary
- Ajgobi Mosque
- Adinath Temple, Maheshkhali
- Ramkot Banashram
- Cox's Bazar–Teknaf Marine Drive
- Sheikh Kamal International Stadium, Cox's Bazar
- Cox's Bazar International Airport
- Cox's Bazar railway station
- Ramu Cantonment

== Notable people ==
=== Politician ===
1. Salahuddin Ahmed (Cox's Bazar politician), Member of Parliament from Cox's Bazar-1
2. Hasina Ahmed, Member of Parliament from Cox's Bazar-1
3. A. H. Salahuddin Mahmud
4. Jafar Alam, Member of Parliament from Cox's Bazar-1
5. Mohammed Ellias, Member of Parliament from Cox's Bazar-1
6. Enamul Haq Manju, Member of Parliament from Cox's Bazar-1
7. Syed Muhammad Ibrahim, Member of Parliament from Cox's Bazar-1
8. Alamgir Mohammad Mahfuzullah Farid, Member of Parliament from Cox's Bazar-2
9. A. H. M. Hamidur Rahman Azad, Member of Parliament from Cox's Bazar-2
10. Asheq Ullah Rafiq, Member of Parliament from Cox's Bazar-2
11. A. T. M. Nurul Bashar Chowdhury, Member of Parliament from Cox's Bazar-2
12. Jahirul Islam, Member of Parliament from Cox's Bazar-2
13. Md. Ishak, Member of Parliament from Cox's Bazar-2
14. Lutfur Rahman Kajal, Member of Parliament from Cox's Bazar-3
15. Shaimum Sarwar Kamal, Member of Parliament from Cox's Bazar-3
16. Mostaq Ahmad Chowdhury, Member of Parliament from Cox's Bazar-3
17. Didarul Alam Chowdhury, Member of Parliament from Cox's Bazar-3
18. Mohammad Khalequzzaman, Member of Parliament from Cox's Bazar-3
19. Mohammad Sahiduzzaman, Member of Parliament from Cox's Bazar-3
20. Shahjahan Chowdhury, Member of Parliament from Cox's Bazar-4
21. Abdur Rahman Bodi, Member of Parliament from Cox's Bazar-4
22. Shahin Akhtar, Member of Parliament from Cox's Bazar-4
23. Mohammad Ali (Cox's Bazar politician), Member of Parliament from Cox's Bazar-4
24. Abdul Gani (Cox's Bazar politician), Member of Parliament from Cox's Bazar-4
25. AHA Gafur Chowdhury, Member of Parliament from Cox's Bazar-4
26. Aye Thein Rakhaine, Member of Parliament from Cox's Bazar
27. Kaniz Fatema Ahmed, Member of Parliament from Cox's Bazar
28. Khorshed Ara Haque, Member of Parliament from Cox's Bazar
29. Mahmudul Karim Chowdhury, Member of Parliament from Cox's Bazar
30. Osman Sarwar Alam Chowdhury, Member of Parliament from Cox's Bazar
31. Shamsuddin Ahmad Chowdhury, Member of Parliament from Cox's Bazar
32. Farid Ahmad, Minister of Pakistan
33. Fazlul Karim (lawyer), Adviser

=== Educators and Researchers ===
1. Badiul Alam, Vice Chancellor of Chittagong University
2. Shireen Akhter, Vice Chancellor of Chittagong University
3. Shyamal Kanti Biswas, Vice Chancellor of Chittagong University of Engineering and Technology
4. Mohammad Zoynal Abedin, Vice Chancellor of Dhaka University of Engineering and Technology
5. Nurul Mustafa, Vice Chancellor of BGC Trust University and Southern University, Bangladesh
6. Obaidullah Hamzah, Secretary-General of Anjuman-e-Ittihadul Madaris Bangladesh
7. Siddique Ahmad, Secretary-General of Anjuman-e-Ittihadul Madaris Bangladesh
8. Mohammad Nurul Huda, Director General of Bangla Academy
9. Mongsen Ching Monsin, Ekushey Padak awarded researcher
10. Rashiduddin Ahmad, Independence Awarded neurosurgeon
11. Salimullah Khan, public intellectual

=== Secretary and Officers ===
1. Mohammad Shafiul Alam, 21st Cabinet Secretary
2. Helal Uddin Ahmed, member of the Bangladesh Public Service Commission
3. AMM Nasir Uddin, current Chief Election Commissioner of Bangladesh
4. Mohammad Ali (judge), justice of the High Court Division of the Bangladesh Supreme Court.
5. Hamidul Haque, retired two-star officer of Bangladesh Army

=== Freedom Fighters ===
1. ATM Zafar Alam, Independence Day Awarded Freedom Fighter
2. Mohammad Ziauddin, Bir Uttam
3. Shahid Saber

=== Players ===
1. Hasan Murad, Cricketer
2. Mominul Haque, Cricketer
3. Tawhidul Alam Sabuz, Footballer
4. Mohammad Ibrahim (footballer, born 1997)
5. Sushanto Tripura, Footballer
6. Anisur Rahman Zico, Footballer
7. Hasan Murad Tipu, Footballer
8. Sunil Krishna Dey Chowdhury, Footballer

=== Others ===
1. Jinnat Ali, tallest person from Bangladesh
2. Rima Sultana Rimu, Human Rights Activists
3. Satya Priya Mahathero, Ekushey Padak awarded monk
4. Ilias Kobra, Actor
5. Jalaluddin Ahmad, Landlord
