= Matamuhuri Upazila =

Matamuhuri মাতামুহুরী
- Upazila
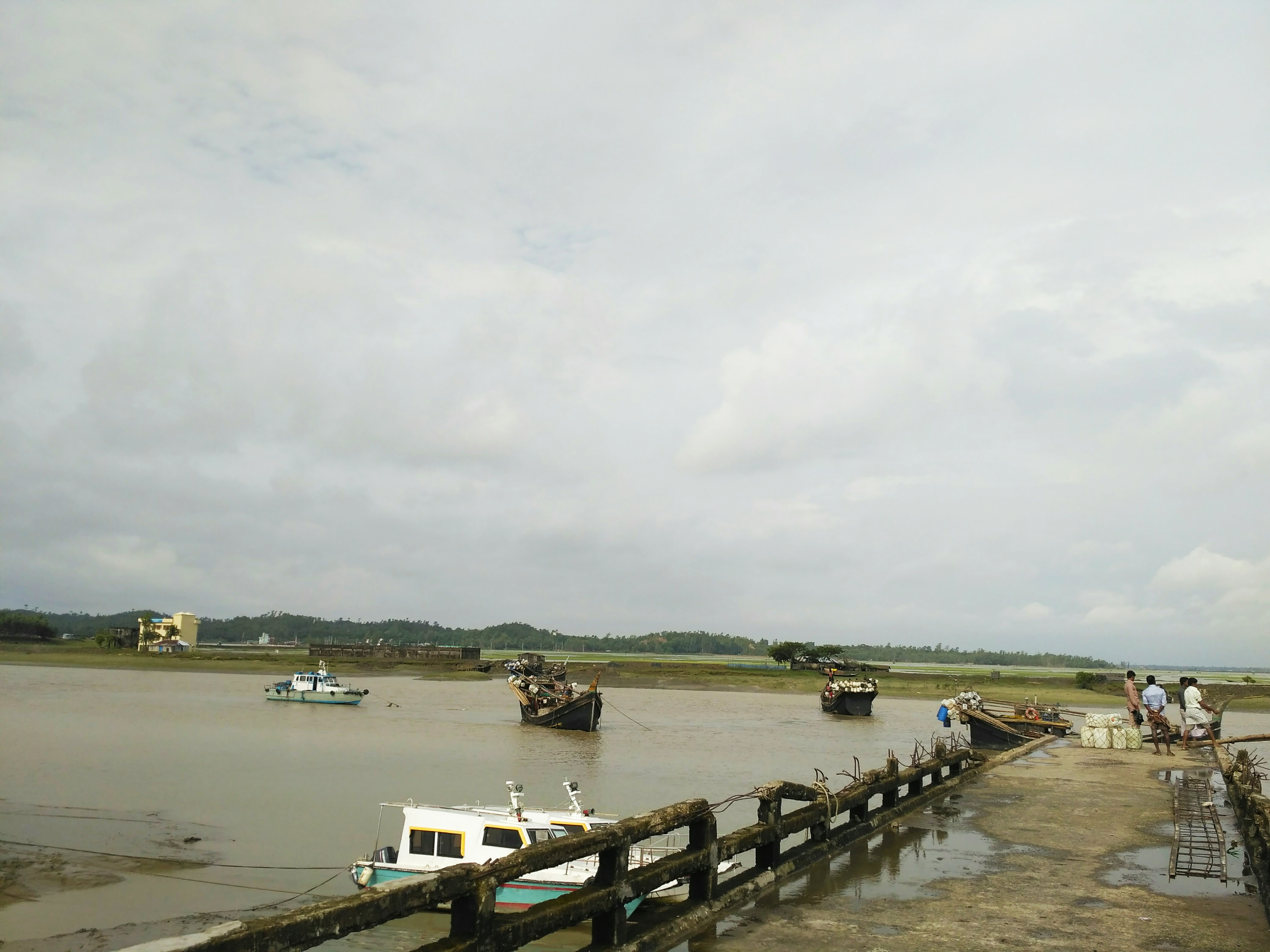
- Matamuhuri River at Badarkhali Union, Matamuhuri Upazila
- Country: Bangladesh
- Division: Chittagong
- District: Cox's Bazar
- Established: 7 May 2026

Area
  - Total: 143.08 km^{2} (55.24 sq mi)

Population (2022)
  - Total: 162,702
  - Density: 1,137.1/km^{2} (2,945.2/sq mi)
- Postal code: 4742

Matamuhuri (Bengali: মাতামুহুরী) is an upazila of Cox's Bazar District in Bangladesh. It is being formed by bifurcating the Chakaria Upazila. The upazila is named after the Matamuhuri River.

== Geography ==
The total area of Matamuhuri Upazila is 143.08 square kilometres (55.24 sq mi). It is located approximately 67 km from the Cox's Bazar district headquarters. It is bounded by Pekua Upazila to the north, Eidgaon Upazila to the south, Chakaria Upazila to the east, and Maheshkhali Upazila to the west.

== Administrative divisions ==
The proposed upazila consists of seven unions:

- Badarkhali Union
- Purba Boro Veola Union
- Saharbil Union
- Veola Manikchar Union
- Paschim Boro Veola Union
- Demushia Union
- Konakhali Union

== Demographics ==
According to the 2022 census, the total population of the seven unions forming Matamuhuri is 162,702.

Religious Demographics (2022)
Religion	Population	Percentage
Islam	160,052	98.37%
Hinduism	2,592	1.59%
Others	58	0.04%

The majority of the population are Muslims, followed by a Hindu minority.

== Education ==
Notable educational institutions in the area include:

- Badarkhali College
- Badarkhali MS Fazil Madrasa
- Al-Azhar High School
- Virtu School and College
- RK Nurul Amin Chowdhury High School
- BMS High School
- Badarkhali Colony High School
- Veola Manikchar High School
- Bahaddarkata High School
- Purba Boro Veola GNA Missionary High School
- Demushia Jinnat Ali Chowdhury High School
- Konakhali Karimia High School
- Elishia Jamila Begum High School
- Darbeshkata High School

== River system ==
The major rivers flowing through Matamuhuri Upazila are the Matamuhuri River, the Bura Matamuhuri River, and the Maheshkhali Channel.

== Notable people ==
- Nurul Mustafa, former Vice-Chancellor of BGC Trust University Bangladesh and Southern University, Bangladesh.

== Politics ==
Matamuhuri is part of the Cox's Bazar-1 parliamentary constituency. The current Member of Parliament for this area is Salahuddin Ahmed, representing the Bangladesh Nationalist Party.

== See also ==
- Upazilas of Bangladesh
- Districts of Bangladesh
- Chittagong Division
