= Matamuhuri =

Matamuhuri may refer to:

- Matamuhuri Upazila, a upazila of Cox’s Bazar District.
- Matamuhuri River, a river in southeastern Bangladesh.
