= Saroj Kanti Singh Hazari =

Bangladeshi academic

- Born: December 1, 1947 (age 78); Dohazari, Chandanaish, Chittagong, Bangladesh
- Education: Technical University of Berlin
- Occupations: Academic, writer, professor
- Employer(s): University of Chittagong; BGC Trust University Bangladesh; Dhaka Residential Model College
- Known for: Chemistry textbooks, contributions to chemistry education in Bangladesh
- Title: Vice-Chancellor of BGC Trust University Bangladesh (2009–2021)
- Successor: A. F. M. Aaurangajeb

Saroj Kanti Singh Hazari is a Bangladeshi chemist and academic renowned for his chemistry textbooks taught on Bangladeshi schools and colleges. He was a professor at the University of Chittagong He was the Vice-chancellor at BGC Trust from 2009–2021.

== Biography ==
Hazari was born on 1 December, 1947, at Dohazari in Chandanaish, Chittagong. He earned his M.sc. from University of Dhaka, PhD from the Technical University of Berlin, Germany. Subsequently, he conducted his postdoctoral research at the University of Exeter in the United Kingdom, Tokyo University of Technology in Japan, the University of Hamburg in Germany, and Friedrich Schiller University Jena.

He taught in the Department of Chemistry at the University of Chittagong for a long period of 43 years. Afterwards, he joined BGC Trust University Bangladesh, a private university established in Chittagong, as its Vice-Chancellor. After serving around 12 years in this role, he retired in January 2021, and A. F. M. Aurangzeb succeeded him.
