= Moheshkhali Island =

Island in Bangladesh

- Interactive map of Moheshkhali Island

Geography
- Location: Moheshkhali Upazila
- Coordinates: 21.5840°N 91.9226°E

Administration
- Bangladesh

Moheshkhali Island (Bengali: মহেশখালী, romanized: Môhēśkhālī, pronounced [mɔɦeʃkʰaliː]) is the main island of Moheshkhali Upazila, in the Cox's Bazar District of Bangladesh. There will be two LNG terminals FSRU and gas pipeline created to ease Bangladesh gas shortage.

Moheshkhali is the only hilly island in Bangladesh. Combined with Kutubdia, another island smaller than itself, Moheshkhali forms the constituency known as Cox's Bazar-2 in Bangladesh Parliament. It is an Upazila under Cox's Bazar District. It's famous nationwide for its sweet betel nut leaf. On Moheshkhali you'll find the traditional Hindu Adinath Temple. Around 400,000 people live on the island.

The island's chief products are betel nut leaf and salt and it’s also known for its sun‑dried fish known as "Shutki". Right now, one of Bangladesh's largest deep‑water port is located in Moheshkhali.
