= A. J. M. Nuruddin Chowdhury =

AJM Nuruddin Chowdhury
- Born: c. 1950
- Died: 26 September 2020; Dhaka, Bangladesh
- Occupation: Academic
- Employer: University of Chittagong
- Known for: Vice Chancellor of the University of Chittagong
- Title: Professor
- Term: February 2002 – February 2006
- Spouse: Yes
- Children: 3

AJM Nuruddin Chowdhury (c. 1950 – 26 September 2020) was a Bangladeshi academic and former vice chancellor of the University of Chittagong. He served as the university's vice chancellor from February 2002 to February 2006.

== Career ==
Chowdhury was a professor at the Department of Marketing, University of Chittagong. He also served as the department's chairman. He had established the Department of Marketing in 1992.

In 2002, Chowdhury was appointed as the vice chancellor of the University of Chittagong. His administration faced allegations of irregularities in the appointments and promotions of teachers and staff. He was accused of favouritism toward individuals linked to the ruling Bangladesh Jamaat-e-Islami, and the Bangladesh Nationalist Party. Controversy arose particularly over the appointment of Professor Zahirul Haq as chairman of the Finance Department, bypassing a more senior candidate, which led to protests from student and teacher groups. He was criticised for the over-appointment of 90 Class Three and Class Four employees within two and a half years, many of whom were allegedly selected based on political affiliation or personal ties. Reports indicated that over 25 of the appointees were associated with the Bangladesh Jamaat-e-Islami and the Bangladesh Nationalist Party, while around 30 were from the Vice Chancellor's home village of Madarsha, including two of his nephews and a former domestic worker. He attended a conference of the Muniriaia Tablig Committee.

In December 2005, Chowdhury hosted Muhmmad Yunus, his wife, and daughters Monica and Dina at the University of Chittagong. He served as the vice chancellor of the University of Chittagong until 2006. Dr. M. Badiul Alam succeeded him as the vice-chancellor.

Chowdhury later served as the vice-chancellor of Southern University Bangladesh. He was the Director of IQAC at Southern University Bangladesh. He conducted a workshop at the International Islamic University Chittagong.

== Death ==
Chowdhury died of COVID-19 on 26 September 2020 while undergoing treatment at United Hospital, Dhaka during the COVID-19 pandemic in Bangladesh.
