= Cox's Bazar Government High School =

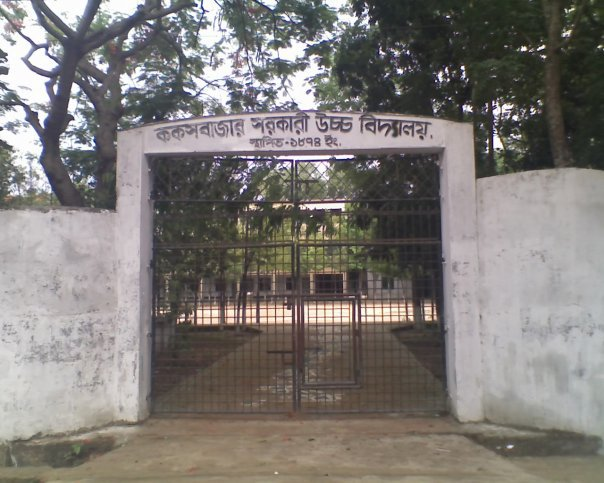

Location
- Hospital road, Cox's Bazar, Chittagong Division; Bangladesh; 21.4405°N 91.9778°E

Information
- Type: Government Boys' High School
- Motto: মানসম্পন্ন বিদ্যালয়, মানসম্পন্ন জাতি তৈরী করে (Better School Make A Better Nation)
- Established: 1874
- School board: Chittagong Education Board
- Grades: Class 6-10
- Enrollment: Approximately 2400
- Language: Bengali
- Campus size: About 23 acres
- Color

Cox's Bazar Government High School is a secondary boys' school in Cox's Bazar, the administrative headquarters of the district in Bangladesh of the same name. It was founded in 1874. It is located on the north-east side of Bir-Sreshtho Ruhul Amin Stadium, hospital road 9 no. word Cox’s Bazar Municipality The area of the school is 23 acres. This is one of the oldest schools in the country.

== The school ==
The school campus is urban, but has a well-maintained garden with trees of various kinds. There are five academic buildings. The library is associated with Bishwa Sahitya Kendra. It has a big auditorium named Shaheed Shah Alam - Bashir Milonayoton . The school has labs for physics, chemistry, agricultural science, computer science, and biology. These labs are equipped with necessary apparatus which are required to perform all the secondary school level experiment. It has a residence for headmaster, a canteen, a teacher's dormitory and a big play ground.

== Structure ==
The school enrolls students from class (grade) 6 to 10. The school operates in two shifts - morning and day. In each shift generally exists two sections in each class (grade). And each section with 60 to 70 students. Every year about 300+ students appear in the SSC and JSC examination, with about two-thirds in science, and the rest in business studies.

== Admissions ==
Every year an admission test is used to be arranged between November–December session where authority select the students on the basis of merit position. Since 2021, authority select the students on lottery.

== Uniform ==
The uniform of the school is a white shirt, white pant, black belt and white shoes. There is a badge on the shoulder which indicates morning or day shift student.

== Co-curricular activities ==
- Boy Scouts
- Red Crescent

== Notable alumni ==
- Khaled Mosharraf, one of the great freedom fighters of Bangladesh, Sector Commander of 'Sector 2' during liberation war, salute as 'Bir Uttom' the best honor to a living freedom fighter.

== Gallery ==
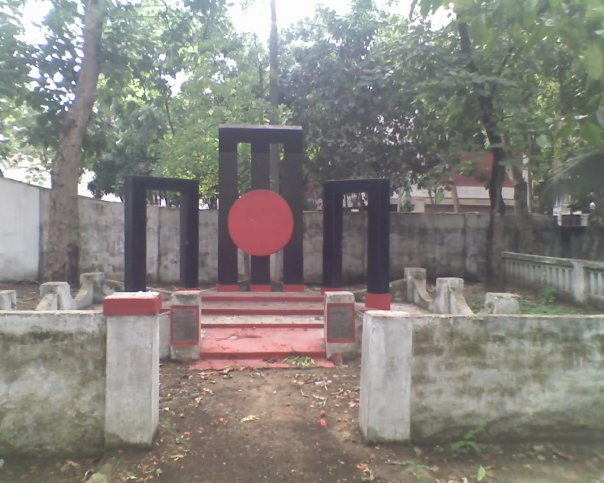
Shaheed Minar

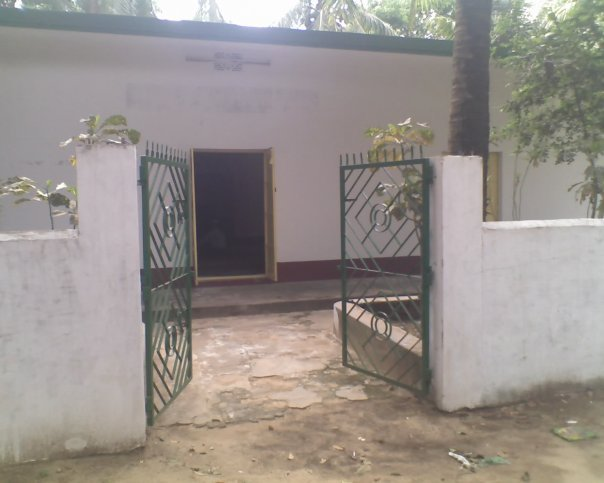
Mosque

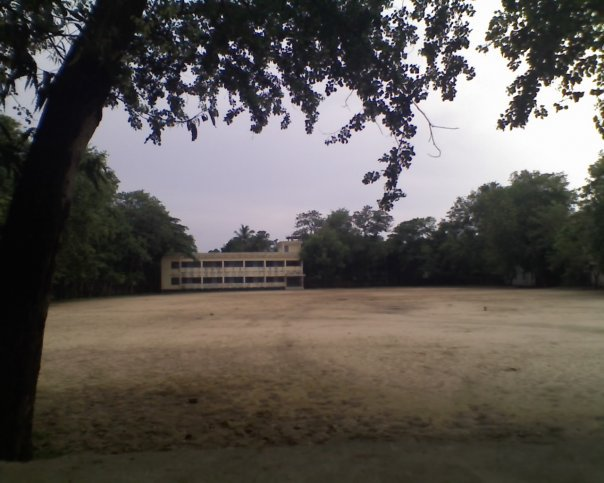
Hostel and playground

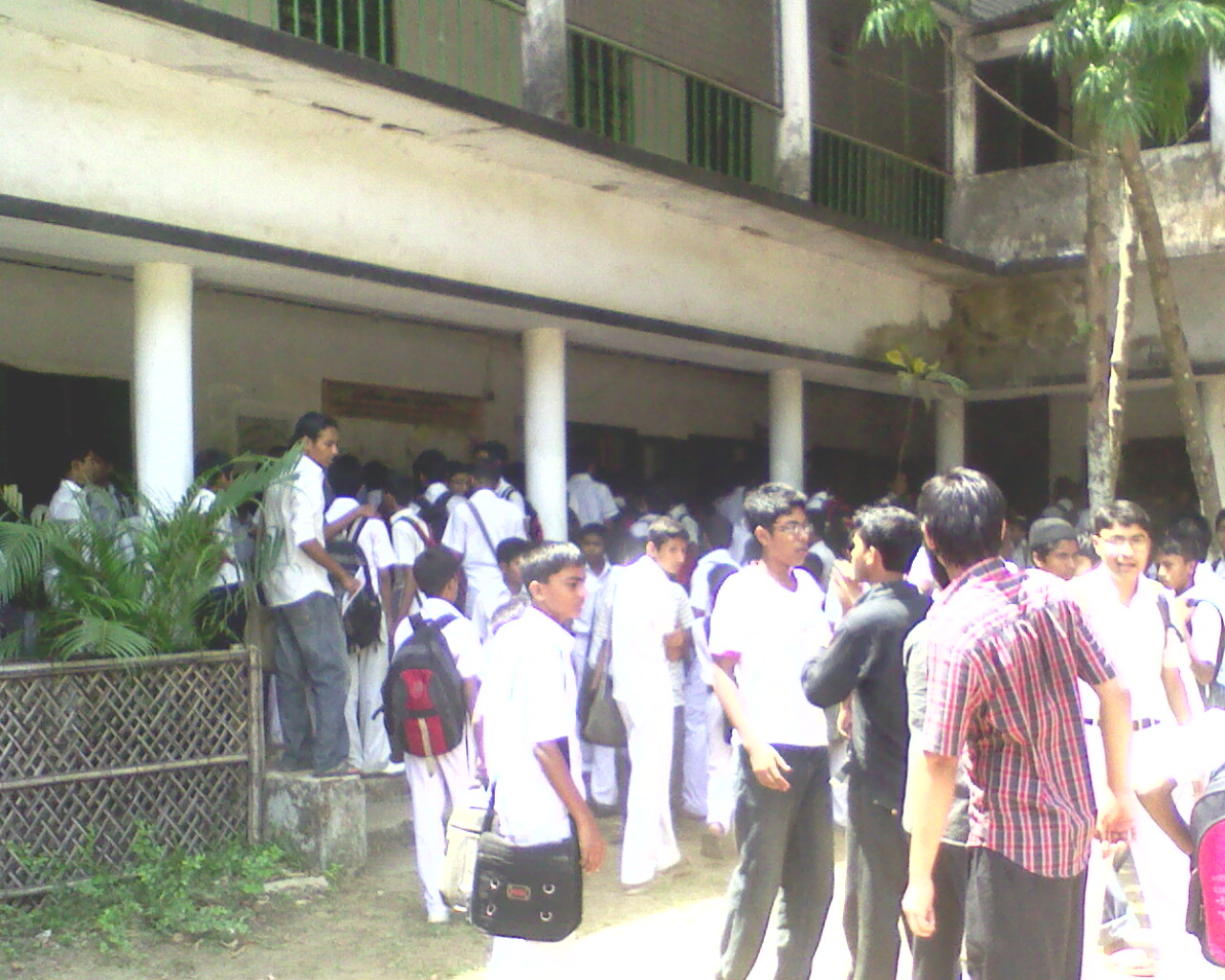
Students in front of the Administrative Building (on the result day of 2010 SSC examination)
