= Rima Sultana Rimu =

Bangladeshi women's rights activist

Rima Sultana Rimu (Bengali: রিমা সুলতানা রিমু; born c. 2002) is a Bangladeshi women's rights activists and advocate for gender-responsive humanitarian action in Cox's Bazar. She was named as one of the BBC's 100 Women for 2020.

== Personal life ==
Rimu was born in 2002 in Ramu in the Chittagong Division of Bangladesh, into a peasant farming family.

== Activism ==
In 2018, Rimu joined Young Women Leaders for Peace within the Global Network of Women Peacebuilders (GNWP), established in collaboration with the local non-governmental organisation Jago Nari Unnayon Sangsta (JNUS) and supported by UN Women. As part of this role, she first visited Rohingya refugee camps in Cox's Bazar whilst taking part in JNUS' literacy and numeracy initiative. She subsequently helped devise formal literary and numeracy training courses to deliver to Rohingya children living in the Balukhali camp following finds that 50% of Rohingya children under the age of 12 were receiving no formal education.

In addition to her work with refugees, Rimu has also advocated for mediation and restoration work between refugees and the local population in Cox's Bazar, where tensions were high due to high levels of poverty in the district prior to the arrival of the refugees. Rimu's initiatives on literary and numeracy education, as well as spreading awareness of issues including child marriage, dowries, and domestic abuse, are done among women in Cox's Bazar, regardless if they are Bangladeshi nationals or refugees. Rimu has also used radio broadcasts and plays to spread awareness of these issues.

Rimu has cited Bangladeshi prime minister Sheikh Hasina as amongst her inspirations.

== Recognition ==
In 2020, Rimu was named as one of the BBC's 100 Women; one of two Bangladeshi women recognised that year, alongside Rina Akter.
