= Inani National Park =

National park in Bangladesh

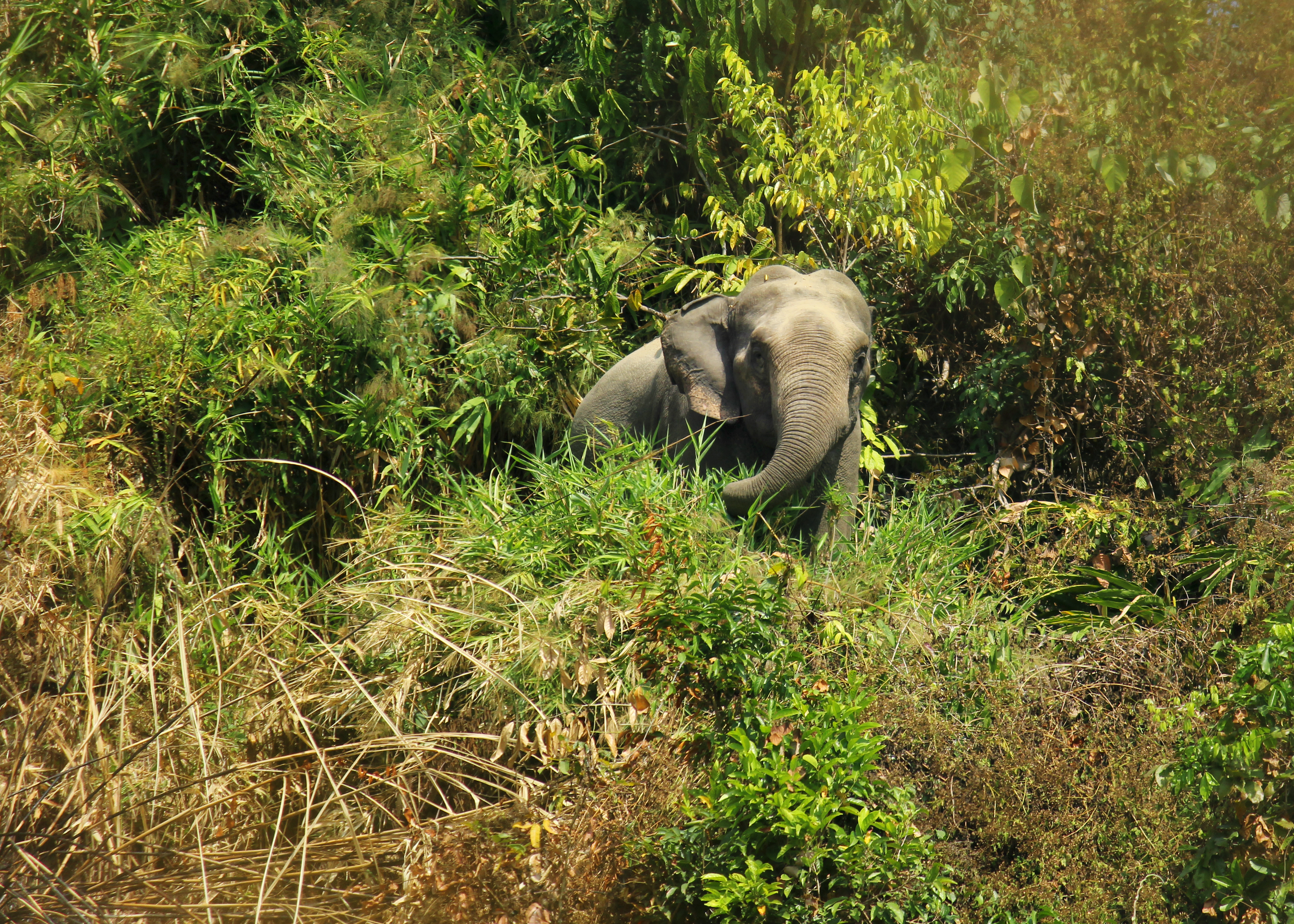
- Asian Elephant in Inani National Park

- Location within Bangladesh
- Location: Cox's Bazar, Chattogram, Bangladesh
- Coordinates: 21.1400025°N 92.0820834°E
- Area: 7,085 ha (17,510 acres)
- Established: 9 July 2019

Inani National Park (formerly known as Sheikh Jamal Inani National Park) is a protected national park in Bangladesh.

== History ==
Located at Ukhia Upazila under Cox's Bazar District, the park was named after Sheikh Jamal, the second son of Bangladesh's first president Sheikh Mujibur Rahman. After the fall of the Hasina regime in 2024, Sheikh Jamal was removed from its name.

The government of Bangladesh declared it as a national park on 9 July 2019. Home to the Asian elephant, it covers an area of 7,085 hectares. It is located in the Inani reserved forest range of Ukhia.
