= Rina Akter =

Bangladeshi humanitarian

- Born: 1988 (age 37–38); Bangladesh
- Occupation: Sex worker turned humanitarian
- Known for: Providing meals for unemployed Dhaka sex workers during the COVID-19 pandemic.

Rina Akter (born c.1988) is a Bangladeshi sex worker turned humanitarian. She was recognised as one of BBC's 100 Women in 2020 for her work when she was organising 400 meals a day during the COVID-19 pandemic for unemployed Dhaka sex workers.

== Life ==
Akter was born in Bangladesh in about 1988. Her family let her go to be employed as a maid. The intermediaries however sold her to brothel when she was eight or ten years old. She worked amongst the sex workers in Dhaka. The organisation she was part of was called Durjoy Nari Sangha and after a while she joined the organisation Lighthouse. There is a drop-in centre where the workers can accessed support including health and legal advice and when required they can get help with births and funerals.

Her work became invaluable during the COVID-19 pandemic when Dhaka's sex workers were starving. Due to fear of infection the sex workers had lost their customers. Some had some savings but many had none and as the brothels (classed as entertainment venues) closed many of their workers tried to sell on the street which created more competition and increased health risks for those involved. Routine health checks for HIV/AIDS became unavailable due to restrictions. National restrictions required social distancing and the workers were getting no food or assistance. With the help of others and NGOs she organises 400 meals a day for these women.

Akter was trying to arrange sewing classes for older sex workers so that they could find paid work as an alternative to begging for assistance.

In 2020 she was one of 100 women and only two Bangladeshi women to be recognised by the BBC for outstanding achievement. The other Bangladeshi woman was the teacher Rima Sultana Rimu who was teaching Rohingya refugees.
