= Kutubdia Dwip =

Island in Bangladesh

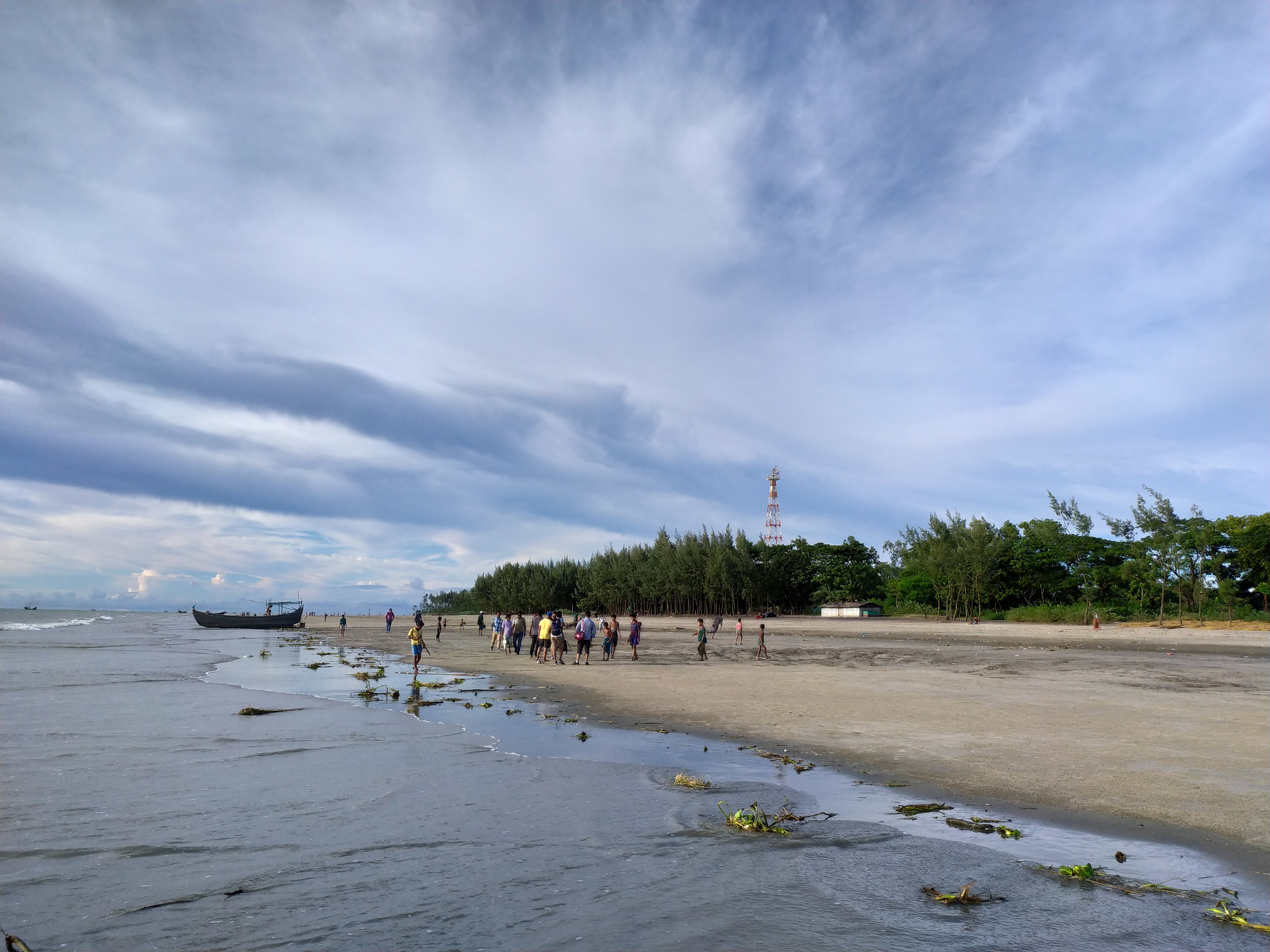
- Interactive map of Kutubdia Dwip

Geography
- Location: Cox's Bazar District
- Coordinates: 21.8167°N 91.8583°E

Administration
- Bangladesh

Kutubdia Dwip (Bengali: কুতুবদিয়া দ্বীপ) is an island of the Cox's Bazar District of Bangladesh. It is famous for its lighthouse.

== Location ==
It is located in north part Cox's Bazar District .

== Effect of climate change ==
Kutubdia Island reduced to half of its original size in 20 years due to erosion. Since 1991, six villages on the island of fishermen and salt workers have been swamped as well as about 40,000 people have fled from their homeland.
