= Satya Priya Mahathero =

Bangladeshi Buddhist leader

Personal life
- Born: Bidhu Bhushan Barua; 10 June 1930 South Merongloa, Cox's Bazar, Bengal Presidency
- Died: 4 October 2019 (aged 89) Dhaka, Bangladesh

Religious life
- Religion: Buddhist

Upa-Sangharaj Satya Priya Mahathero (Bidhu Bhiushan Barua, (born on 10 June 1930, Died on 4 October 2019) Ramu Upazilla, Cox's Bazar, Bangladesh) was a Bangladeshi Buddhist monk, writer, religious leader and social worker. He is mostly known for received the highest honourable national prize of Bangladesh "Ekushey Padak". He was the President of Bangladesh Sangharaj Bhikkhu Mahasava. He was the first translator & writer of 'The Chullyabarga' which is an important part of the Buddhist holy book Tripitaka.

== Biography ==
Satya Priya Mahathero was born on 10 June 1930 in South Merongloa Village of Fatekharpul Union which is situated in Ramu Upazila of Cox's Bazar District. His father was Harakumar Barua and his mother was Premamayi Barua.

Mahathero received pravrajya in February 1950 from Binayacharya Aryabangsha Mahathero and dedicated himself to human beings. Six months later he became a bhikkhu on Maghi Purnima. He received Ekushey Padak in 2015 for social service.

Mahathero died on 4 October 2019 at the age of 89 at Bangabandhu Sheikh Mujib Medical University Hospital, Dhaka.
