= Medhakachhapia National Park =

National park of Bangladesh

- IUCN category IV (habitat/species management area)
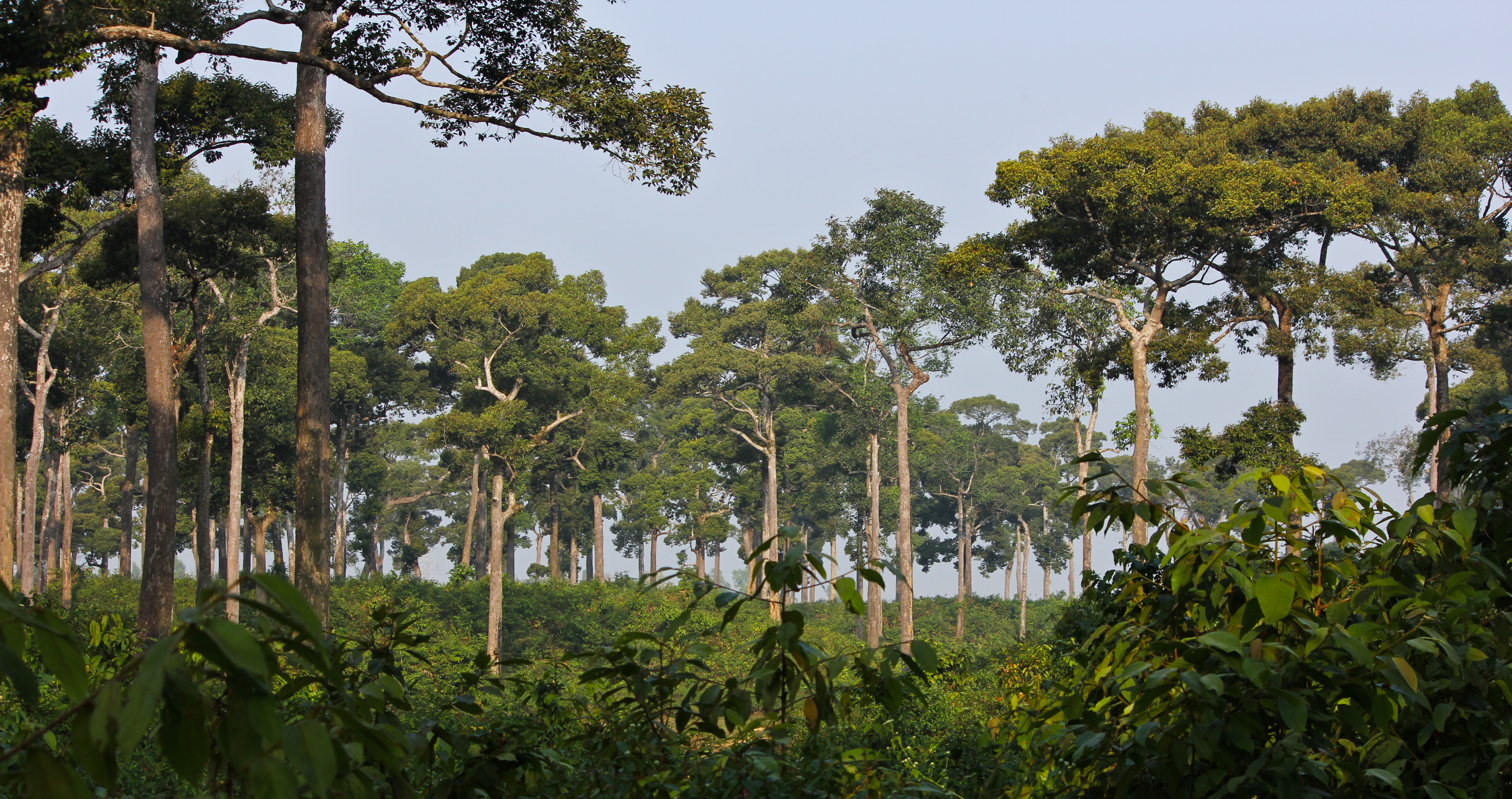
- Interactive map of Medhakachhapia National Park
- Location: Cox's Bazar, Chattogram, Bangladesh
- Coordinates: 21°41′15.56″N 92°9′21.66″E
- Area: 395.92 ha (978.3 acres)
- Established: 8 August 2008

Medhakachhapia National Park is an IUCN Category IV protected national park in Bangladesh. Established in 2004 the park was officially declared as a national park by the government of Bangladesh on 8 August 2008. It is located at the Chakaria Upazila under Cox's Bazar District. It covers an area of 395.92 hectares.

It is a tropical evergreen forest under the control of Cox's Bazar North Forest Department. The main purpose behind establishing this national park was to protect the century-old Rhizophora apiculata.
