= Ajgobi Mosque =

Mosque in Chittagong, Bangladesh

- আজগবি মসজিদ
- Location within Bangladesh Ajgobi Mosque (Bangladesh)

Religion
- Affiliation: Islam
- District: Cox's Bazar
- Status: Operational

Location
- Location: BGB Camp Road, Chowdhurypara, Cox's Bazar
- Country: Bangladesh
- Coordinates: 21.4318398°N 92.0029307°E

Architecture
- Style: Mughal architecture

Ajgobi Mosque (Note: also known as Gayebi Mosque, Sanchi Chowdhury Mosque and Shah Shuja Mosque.) is a mosque situated in Cox's Bazar, Bangladesh, near to the camp of Border Guards Bangladesh, which is one of the tourist attractions in the city. The mosque is located on the banks of Bankkhali River in Chowdhurypara of the city.

== Origin ==
It was established around 17th century when Mughal Prince Shah Shuja was alive. Although its origin is unknown. However, according to the report of Naya Diganta, the mosque was built before the 14th century.

== Architecture ==
Small in size, the mosque has a pond on the north and a 5–6 feet veranda with a courtyard on the east. It is built in the Mughal architectural style. The mosque has a major dome which looks like a Chelonodon. The mosque is 30 feet long and 20 feet wide, its wall is 5 feet thick and no iron was used in construction.

== Legends ==
According to legends, Jinns pray here at the night. Besides, people come to the mosque to make vows to fulfill their wishes. It is said that the mosque survived during 1960 East Pakistan cyclone and 1991 Bangladesh cyclone.

== Heritage ==
In 2020, the Department of Archeology announced that the government has taken initiatives to preserve the mosque as an archaeological site.
