= Adinath Temple, Maheshkhali =

Hindu temple in Bangladesh

Sri Sri Adinath Temple Moheshkhali
- শ্রী শ্রী আদিনাথ মন্দির মহেশখালী
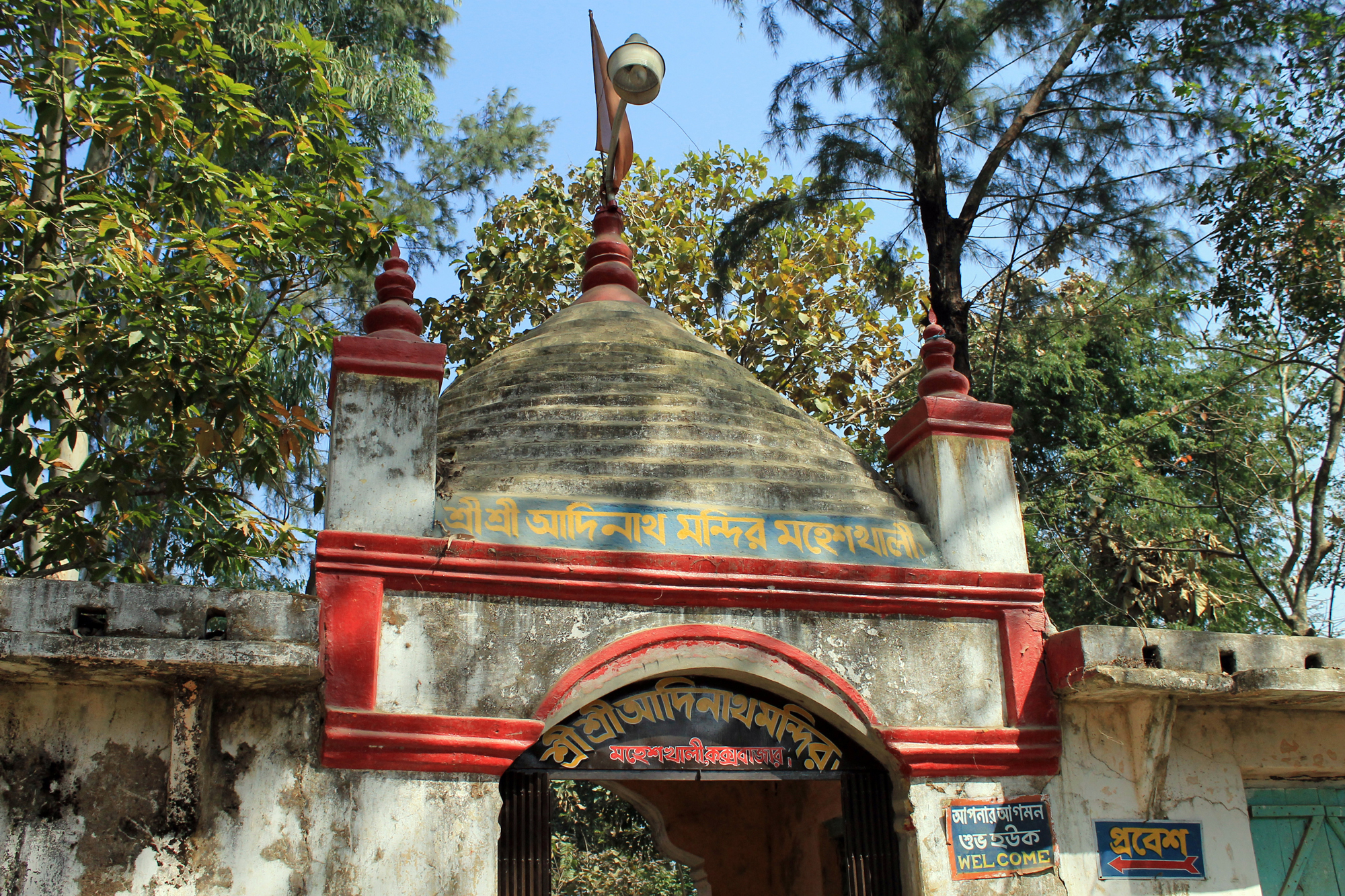
- Entrance to Adinath Temple, 2013

- Location within Bangladesh

Religion
- Affiliation: Hinduism
- Deity: Shiva

Location
- Location: Mainak Hill, Moheshkhali, Cox's Bazar District
- Country: Bangladesh
- Interactive map of Sri Sri Adinath Temple Moheshkhali
- Coordinates: 21.528118°N 91.974811°E

Architecture
- Elevation: 85.3 m (280 ft)

Adinath Temple, located on the summit of Mainak Hill on Maheshkhali Island off the coast of Cox's Bazar, Bangladesh, is dedicated to the Hindu God, Shiva, who is worshipped as Adinath. The temple is famous for the annual fair held at the foot of Mainak Hill in the month of Phalgun as per the Bengali calendar. The fair, which lasts 13 days, draws thousands of Hindus from across Bangladesh.

== Gallery ==
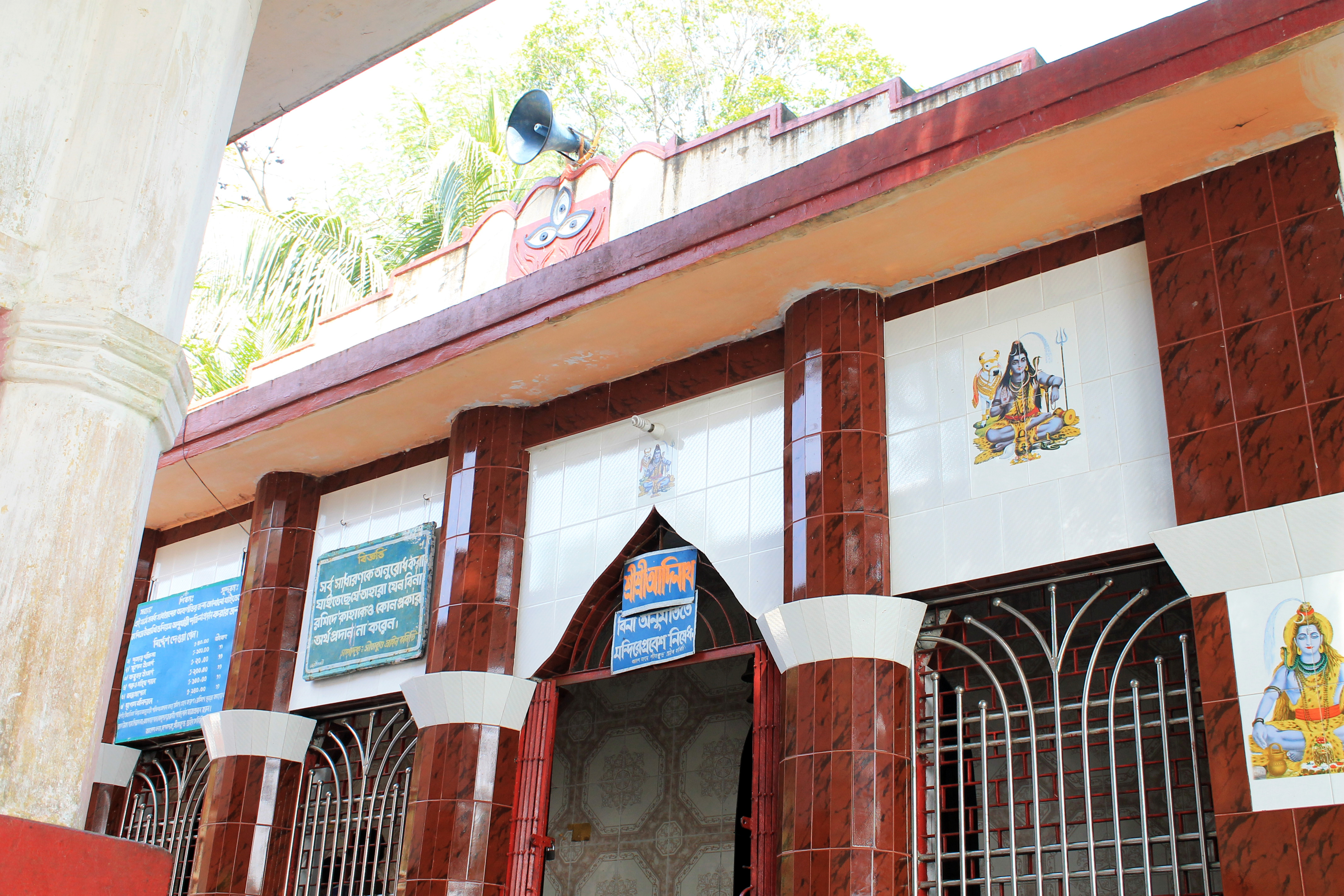
The facade of Adinath temple.

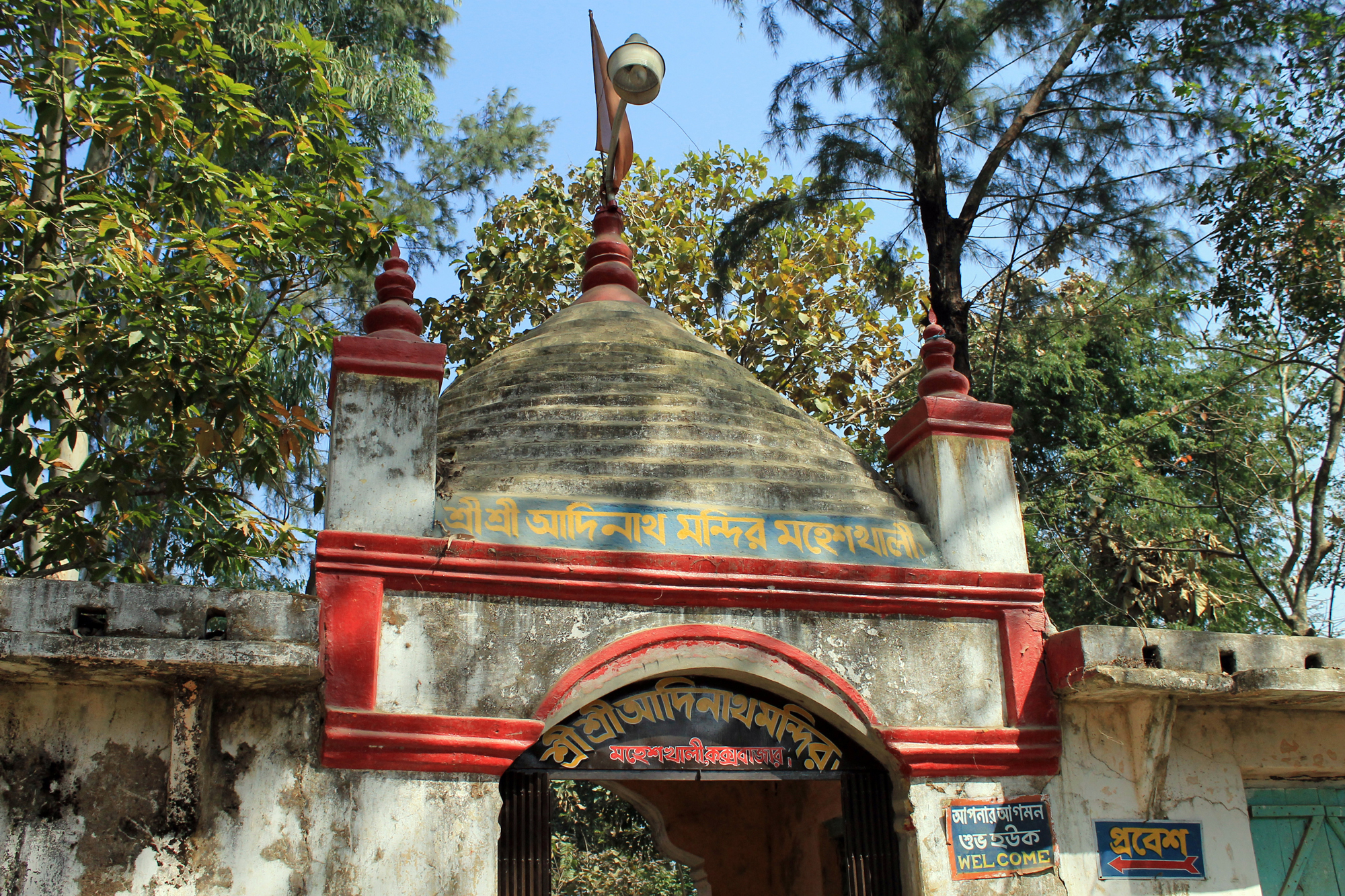
The entrance of Adinath temple in 2013.

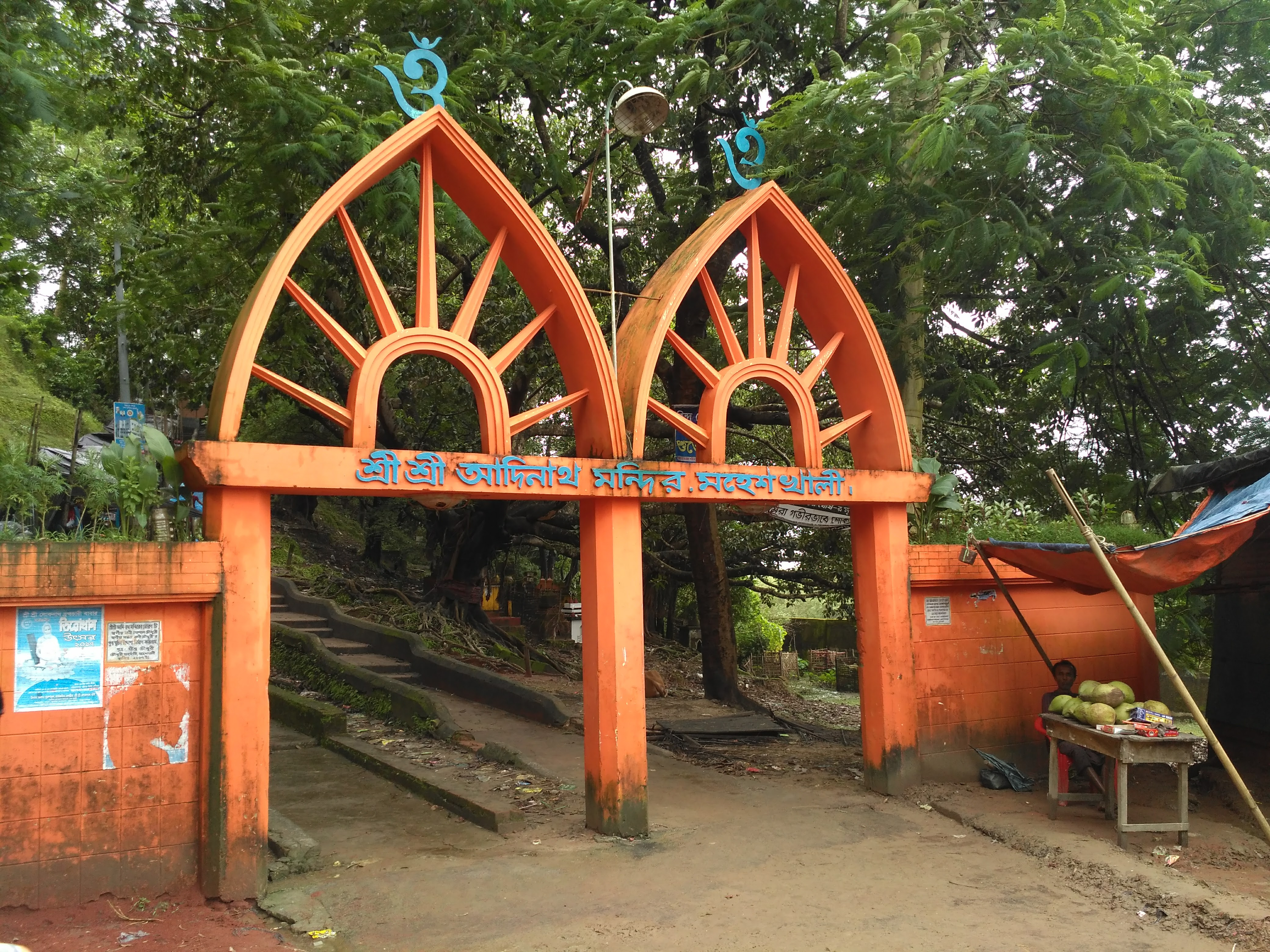
The first gate of Adinath Temple. 2017.

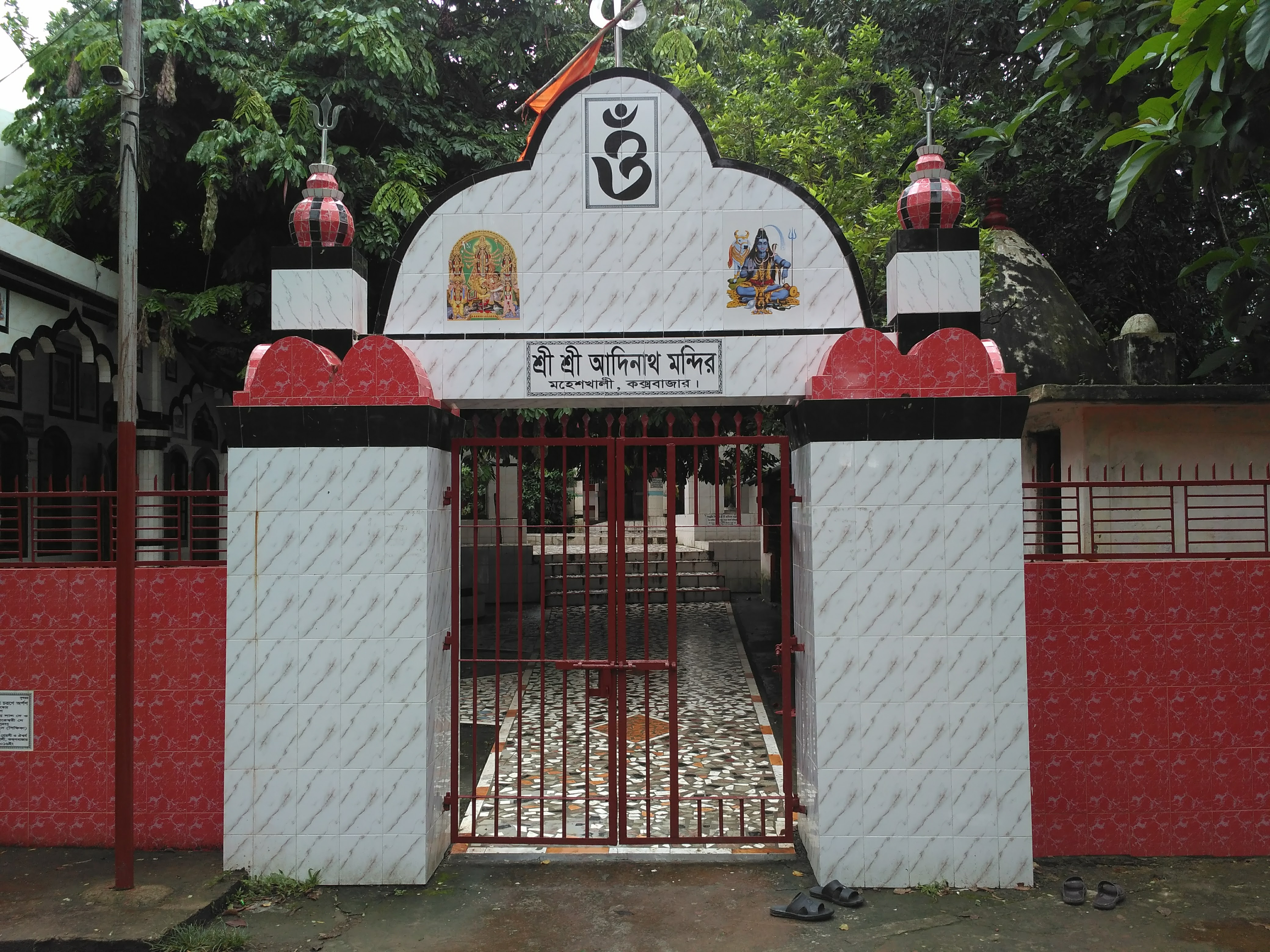
The second gate of Adinath Temple. 2017.

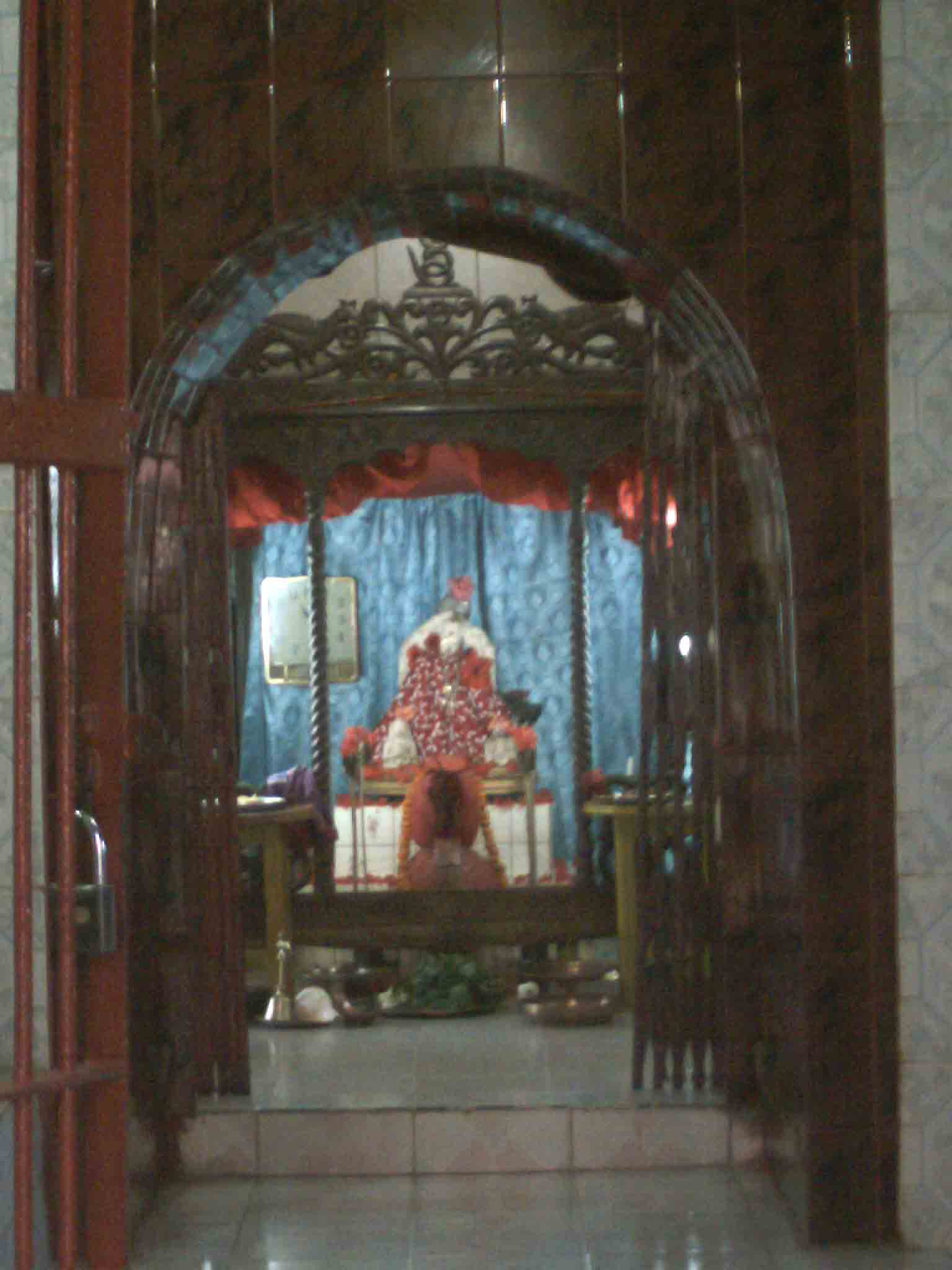
Lord Adinath's idol in the Temple
