= Matamuhuri River =

Coordinates: 21°45′N 91°56′E

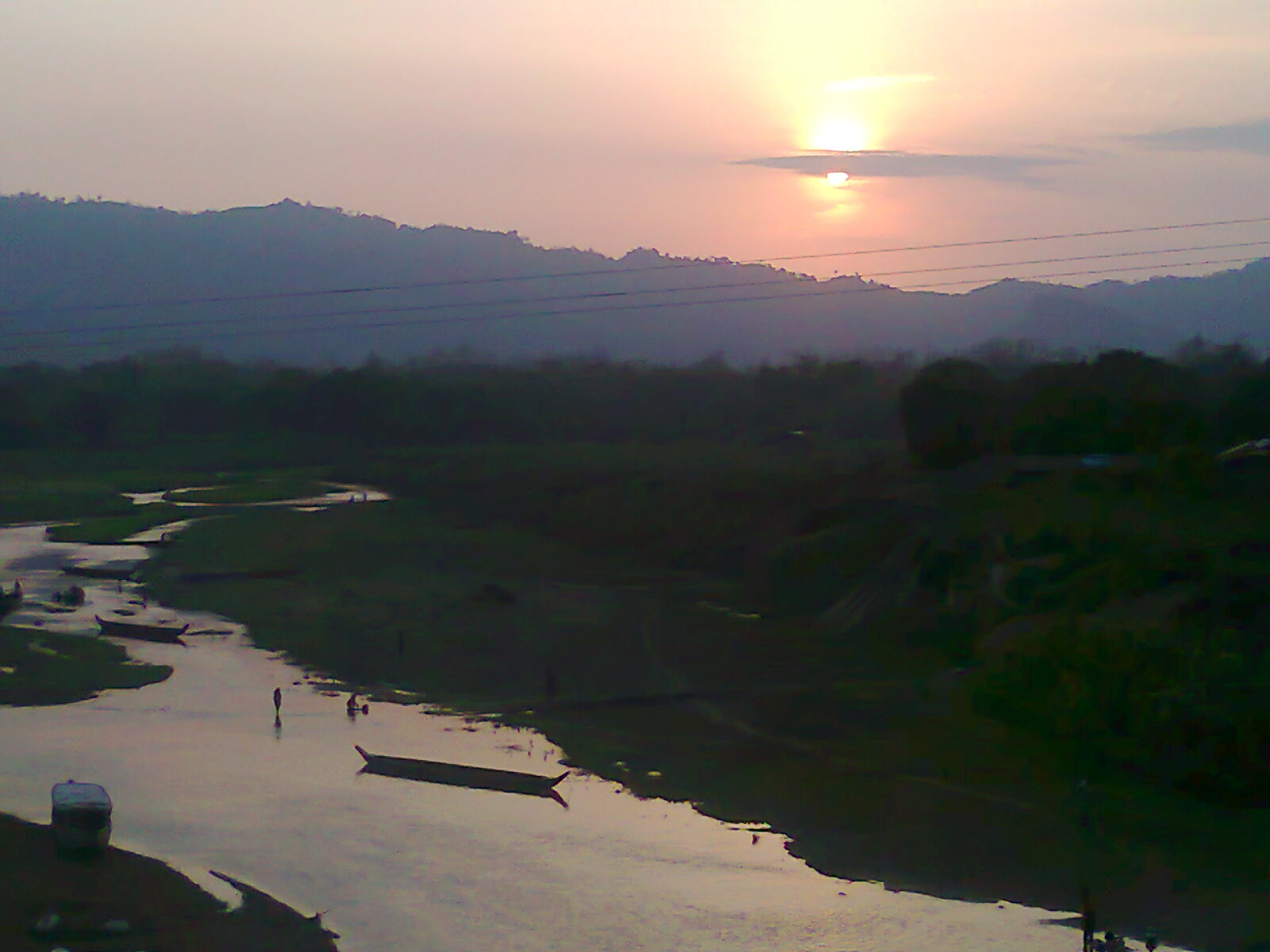
- Sunset over the Matamuhuri River

Location
- Country: Bangladesh
- Region: Chattogram Division
- District: Bandarban District, Cox's Bazar District

Physical characteristics
- Source: Maiver Hills
  - location: Lama
- Mouth: Bay of Bengal
- Length: 287 kilometres (178 mi)

Matamuhuri River is a Bangladeshi river located in the eastern hill region, flowing through both Bandarban District and Cox's Bazar District. The river is about 287 kilometres (178 mi) long, with an average width of 154 metres (505 ft). It flows in a winding, serpentine pattern.

According to the Bangladesh Water Development Board (BWDB), the official identification number of the Matamuhuri River under the eastern hilly region category is River No. 13.

== Origin and dynamics ==
There are multiple views about the exact origin of the Matamuhuri River. Some believe it rises in the Maiver Hills in Lama. In the Marma language, the river is called "Mamuri".

There's a local legend behind the river's name. It is said that the river was not born from a single source or waterfall. Instead, water seeped down from various hills resembling a mother's breasts, slowly forming the river. Thus the name "Matamuhuri"—'mata' meaning 'mother' and 'muhuri' referring to water seeping through many small holes, much like a shower.

The river flows along the western edge of Chakaria Upazila and eventually empties into the Bay of Bengal. It has an approximate total length of 287 km.

The river forms a delta at its mouth in the Bay of Bengal, which stretches from Bholakhal to Khutakhali.

== Settlements ==
Several towns have grown along the Matamuhuri River, including Chakaria, Lama, and Alikadam. A portion of the river also flows through Pekua Upazila. Just as the Nile is vital to Egypt, the Matamuhuri River has been a lifeline for Lama, Alikadam, and Chakaria.

For a long time, this river served as a key route for trade and travel in these areas. Most of the major marketplaces in these upazilas are located on its banks. Human settlement and migration in the hilly regions of Lama and Alikadam began and expanded alongside the river.

== See also ==
- Jadukata River
- Mehgna River
