= Kaniz Fatema Ahmed =

Bangladeshi politician

- কানিজ ফাতেমা আহমেদ

Personal details
- Born: 1 January 1966 (age 59)
- Party: Awami League
- Education: LLM
- Occupation: Lawyer; Business; Politics

Kaniz Fatema Ahmed is an Awami League politician, a senior advocate of the Supreme Court of Bangladesh, lobbyist.

== Career ==
Ahmed is a senior advocate of Supreme Court of Bangladesh. In addition, she is involved in family business and philanthropic activities in her birthplace in Barishal. She is known to be one of the most influential lobbyists for Bangladesh in the international arena.
