= Southern University, Bangladesh =

Private University in Bangladesh

- সাদার্ন ইউনিভার্সিটি বাংলাদেশ
- Former names: Institute of Management and Information Technology
- Motto: Committed to Academic Excellence
- Type: Private
- Established: 1998; 28 years ago
- Founder: Sarwar Jahan
- Accreditation: Institution of Engineers, Bangladesh
- Affiliations: University Grants Commission (UGC)
- Chancellor: President Hafiz Uddin Ahmad
- Vice-Chancellor: Dr. Sharif Ashrafuzzaman
- Location: New/471, University Road, Arefin Nagar, Baizid Bostami, Chittagong, 4210, Bangladesh; 22°23′7″N 91°48′6″E
- Website: www.southern.ac.bd

Southern University Bangladesh (Bengali: সাদার্ন ইউনিভার্সিটি বাংলাদেশ) is a private university in Chittagong, Bangladesh.

Almost since it became a university in 2002, it has been at odds with the University Grants Commission (UGC). The main issues have been the university's opening of unauthorized branch campuses, their failure to establish a permanent campus on time, and a dysfunctional board of trustees split by internal conflicts.

The UGC has warned students against enrolling at Southern University Bangladesh since 2014.

== History ==
The Institute of Management and Information Technology was established in 1998. Sarwar Jahan and Ishrat Jahan obtained approval in 2002 from the Ministry of Education to elevate the institute to a private university named Southern University Bangladesh. Academic activities began in January 2003.

In October 2004, a blue-ribbon panel formed by the education ministry and headed by M. Asaduzzaman, chairman of the UGC, recommended shutting down Southern University and seven other private universities because they violated the Private University Act, 1992. A judicial body formed to follow up on the allegations against the private universities reiterated in January 2005 the recommendation to close Southern University.

The Daily Star reported in 2006 that the university had opened branch campuses in Dhaka, Jessore, and Rangpur without the approval of the UGC. A decade later, the number of illegal campuses it was operating had grown to seven, in Chittagong, Dhaka, Khulna, Kushtia, and Rangpur.

The university had been approved in 2002 on the condition that they establish a permanent campus within five years. By December 2010, the university had purchased sufficient land for a campus, but had not yet begun construction. The education ministry threatened not to allow them to enroll new students unless they moved to their own campus by September 2011. Deadlines were extended four times, and by 2017 construction was underway.

In 2014, the Dhaka Tribune described the university's board of trustees as "driven by conflict". Two court cases involving rival factions on the board were still pending in 2018.

Starting in 2014, the UGC repeatedly warned students that Southern University was operating without approval, and they should be cautious about enrolling at such "crisis-torn universities". Their degrees might not be recognized, and the UGC and education ministry would not accept responsibility if students got into difficulties.

== Administration and organization ==
The university is administered by the Southern University Bangladesh Trust.

A.J.M. Nuruddin Chowdhury was vice-chancellor at the time of the university's first convocation, in 2010. Mohammad Ali served as vice-chancellor from about 2011 to 2016. Nurul Mustafa became vice-chancellor in 2016, and was succeeded by Mozammel Haque in April 2021.

== Academics ==
=== Departments and programs ===
- Department of Business Administration
  - Bachelor of Business Administration (BBA)
  - Master of Business Administration (MBA)
  - Bachelor of Hotel & Tourism Management (HTM)
  - Executive Master of Business Administration (EMBA)
- Department of Computer Science
  - Bachelor of Computer Sc. (B.Sc. in CS)
  - Master of Science in Computer Sc. (M.S. in CS)
- Department of Civil Engineering
  - Bachelor of Civil Engineering (B.Sc. in CE)
- Department of Electronic & Communication Engineering
  - Bachelor of Science in Electronic & Communication Engineering (B.Sc. in ECE)
- Department of Electrical & Electronic Engineering
  - Bachelor of Electrical and Electronic Engineering (B.Sc. in EEE)
- Department of Pharmacy
  - Bachelor of Pharmacy (B.Pharm.)
- Department of Law
  - Bachelor of Law (LLB 4 Years)
  - Bachelor of Law (LLB 2 Years)
  - Master of Laws (LLM)
- Department of English
  - Bachelor of Arts in English (B.A. in English)
  - Master of Arts in English (M.A. in English)
- Department of Islamic Studies
  - Bachelor of Arts in Islamic Studies (B.A in IS)
  - Master of Arts in Islamic Studies (M.A in IS)

== Research ==
The UGC found that the university spent nothing on research in 2012, which is a violation of the Private University Act 2010.

According to the university, it publishes three annual peer-reviewed journals: The Journal of Business and Society (JBS) ISSN 1815-3291, The Journal of Engineering and Science (JES) ISSN 2078-6174, and The Journal of General Education (JGEd) ISSN 2223-4543.

== Alumni ==
- Md. Tajul Islam (born 1955), politician
