= Nurul Mustafa =

Notable Scientist from Bangladesh

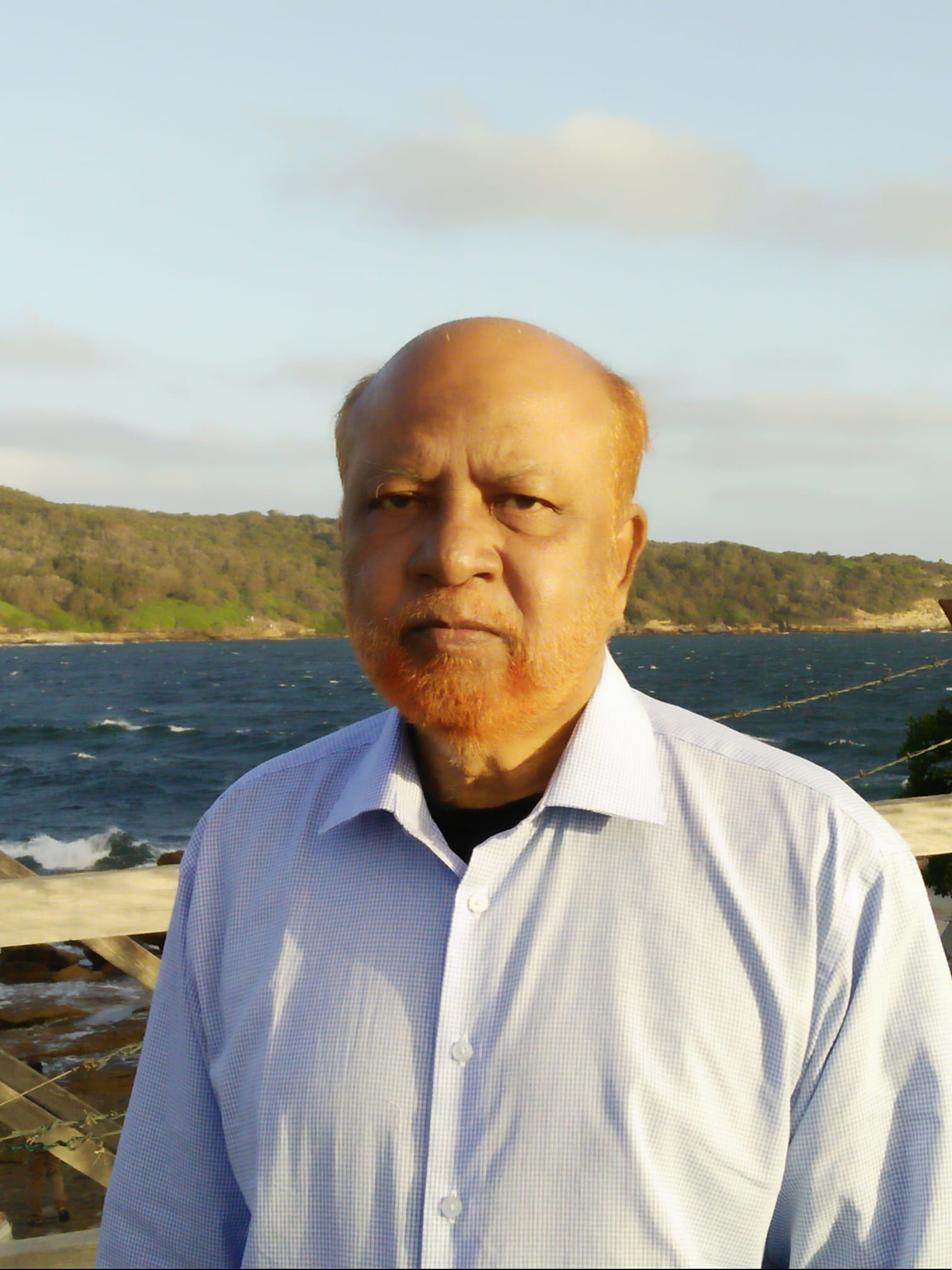
- Professor, scientist
- Born: June 1948; Cox's Bazar, Bangladesh
- Died: 18 July 2021 (aged 73); Chattagram, Bangladesh
- Occupation: Professor
- Spouse: Jahanara Mahbuba Hasnat
- Children: Onu, Titu, Juhi

Nurul Mustafa (June 1948 – 18 July 2021) was the vice-chancellor of Southern University, Bangladesh from Chittagong, Bangladesh and BGC Trust University, Chadanaish.

He was professor of the Department of Physics and Department of Computer Science and Engineering at the University of Chittagong, Bangladesh. He died on 18 July 2021 in Chattagram.

== Education ==
Mustafa completed his early education at Bahaddarkata Primary School, Demushia Jinnat Ali High School, Ilishia Jamila Begum High School and Chakaria Govt. High school. Then, he passed Higher Secondary Exam from the Chittagong College. He received Bachelor of Science in physics from University of Chittagong, Bangladesh. Later, he received Master of Science in physics from Concordia University, Canada. He got his Doctor of Philosophy from University of Chittagong in 1995 under the supervision of Nurul Islam.

== Career ==
Mustafa started his career at Imam Gazzli College as lecturer in 1972. Then, he joined the Department of Physics, University of Chittagong in 1973 as a researcher and became a professor at the department in 1998. He also served as the head of the department.

He was elected the dean of Faculty of Science at the university in 1999 and served for two years. While dean, the Department of Computer Science and Engineering started, with Mustafa as founding chairman and professor in 2000.

Mustafa was appointed the vice-chancellor of BGC Trust University, Chandanaish, Chittagong in 2005 and he served there for 4 years. He then returned to Department of Computer Science and Engineering, University of Chittagong and retired from the university in June, 2014.

Finally, he joined Southern University, Bangladesh as dean of engineering and was appointed the vice-chancellor of the university in January 2016. He served until March, 2021.
