= BGC Trust University Bangladesh =

Bangladeshi research university

- বিজিসি ট্রাস্ট বিশ্ববিদ্যালয় বাংলাদেশ
- Other name: BGCTUB
- Type: Private
- Established: 2001; 25 years ago
- Affiliations: University Grants Commission (UGC)
- Chancellor: President Mirza Fakhrul Islam Alamgir
- Vice-Chancellor: Dr. Md. Manzoorul Kibria
- Academic staff: 121
- Students: 3,033 (2023)
- Undergraduates: 2,819
- Postgraduates: 284
- Location: BGC Bidyanagar, Chandanaish, P.O.: Kanchannagar - 4381, Chittagong, Bangladesh; 22.2478°N 92.0178°E
- Campus: Suburban, 100 acres (0.40 km^{2})
- Colors: Gold and green
- Website: www.bgctub.ac.bd

BGC Trust University Bangladesh (Bengali: বিজিসি ট্রাস্ট বিশ্ববিদ্যালয় বাংলাদেশ) is a private university in Bangladesh, established in 2001. The university is 34 km from the port city Chittagong at a place popularly known as BGC Bidyanagar by the side of the Chittagong-Cox's Bazar highway. The main campus in Chandanaish, spread over 100 acres (0.40 km^{2}) of land, consists of a private university, a private medical college, a 1,000-bed hospital, a nurses' institute, a dental college, a college of physiotherapy and an IT institute. The current vice-chancellor (VC) of the university is Professor Dr. Md. Manzoorul Kibria.

== History ==
BGC Trust was founded by Engr. Afsar Uddin Ahmad. BGC Trust University is approved by the Ministry of Education and the University Grants Commission (UGC) of Bangladesh.

== Faculties and departments ==
UGC Approved Faculties and Departments
Sl. No.	Faculties	Departments
1	Faculty of Business Administration	Department of Business Administration
2	Faculty of Law, Arts and Social Sciences	Department of English
2	Faculty of Law, Arts and Social Sciences	Department of Journalism and Media Studies
2	Faculty of Law, Arts and Social Sciences	Department of Law
2	Faculty of Law, Arts and Social Sciences	Department of Public Health
3	Faculty of Science and Engineering	Department of Computer Science and Engineering
3	Faculty of Science and Engineering	Department of Pharmacy

== Students ==
BGC Trust University began in 2001 with 500 students. Now it has grown to more than 3,000 per year. The total number of students in 2023 is 3,033, consisting of 2,237 males and 796 females. Among these, 2,819 students are pursuing undergraduate degrees, while 214 are enrolled in postgraduate programs. In the academic year 2023, a new cohort of 1,121 students was admitted to the university, with 803 male and 318 female students.

== Academic programs ==
Department of Computer Science and Engineering
Degrees offered	Abbreviation	Level
Bachelor of Science (Honours) in Computer Science and Engineering	B.Sc. (Hons.) in CSE	Undergraduate Program
Master of Science in Computer Science and Engineering	M.Sc. in CSE	Postgraduate Program

Department of Pharmacy
Degrees offered	Abbreviation	Level
Bachelor of Pharmacy (Honours)	B.Pharm. (Hons.)	Undergraduate Program

Department of Business Administration
Degrees offered	Abbreviation	Level
Bachelor of Business Administration	BBA	Undergraduate Program
Master of Business Administration	MBA	Postgraduate Program
Executive Master of Business Administration	EMBA	Postgraduate Program

(Major in Finance, Marketing, Human Resource Management, Management Information System, Accounting, International Business)

Department of English
Degrees offered	Abbreviation	Level
Bachelor of Arts (Honours) in English	B.A. (Hons.) in English	Undergraduate Program
Master of Arts in English	M.A. in English	Postgraduate Program

Department of Law
Degrees offered	Abbreviation	Level
Bachelor of Laws (Honours)	LL.B. (Hons.)	Undergraduate Program
Bachelor of Laws	LL.B. (2 Years)	Undergraduate Program

Department of Journalism and Media Studies
Degrees offered	Abbreviation	Level
Bachelor of Social Science (Honours) in Journalism and Media Studies	B.S.S. (Hons.) in JMS	Undergraduate Program

Department of Public Health
Degrees offered	Abbreviation	Level
Master of Public Health	MPH	Postgraduate Program

Certificate Courses
Courses offered	Duration
Certificate Course on English Language for Communication	36 Hours
Certificate Course on Professional Full Stack Web Development for Software Outsourcing	48 Hours
Certificate Course on Supply Chain Management	24 Hours
Certificate Course on Trial Advocacy	24 Hours

== List of vice-chancellors ==
- Dr. Md. Manzoorul Kibria (1 December 2025 - present )
- Dr. A.F.M. Aowrangazab
- Dr. Saroj Kanti Singh Hazari
- Dr. Md. Nurul Mustafa

== Semesters ==
The academic year of the BGC Trust University Bangladesh has two semesters. The duration of each semester is six months.

- Spring Session (January - June)
- Summer Session (July - December)

== Grading system ==
The Universal Grading System introduced by the University Grant Commission (UGC) of Bangladesh followed by the BGC Trust University Bangladesh. The total numerical marks obtained by a student in each course will be converted into Letter Grade (LG) and Grade Point (GP). According to the Grade Point, the GPA (Grade Point Average) and CGPA (Cumulative Grade Point Average) will be calculated. The conversion of Letter Grade and Grade Point will be as follows:

Grading System of BGCTUB
Letter Grades	Grade Point	Numerical Markings	Comments
A+	4.00	80% and above	Excellent
A	3.75	75% to less than 80%	Better
A-	3.50	70% to less than 75%	Good
B+	3.25	65% to less than 70%	Above average
B	3.00	60% to less than 65%	Average
B-	2.75	55% to less than 60%	Below average
C+	2.50	50% to less than 55%	Satisfactory
C	2.25	45% to less than 50%	Not satisfactory
D	2.00	40% to less than 45%	Pass
F	0.00	Less than 40%	Fail
I			Incomplete
W			Official Withdrawn

== Clubs ==
Each department of this university has different clubs. For the students, these clubs regularly conduct different types of curricular and co-curriculum activities and organize various events inside and outside the campus

== Library ==
The BGC Trust University library has 50,000 books, a collection of print journals and other publications, and subscriptions to international academic journals. The library location at BGC Biddayanagar Campus.

== See also ==
- List of universities in Bangladesh
