= Eid (name) =

Eid (Arabic: عيد) is a masculine given name of Arabic origin. It is also used as a surname by the Jewish people in Galicia, an historical region in Eastern Europe.

Notable people with the name include:

== Surname ==
- Abdulrazak Eid (born 1950), Syrian writer
- Adel Eid (born 1984), Finnish–Egyptian football player
- Ahmed Eid (disambiguation), multiple people
- Ali Eid (disambiguation), multiple people
- Allison H. Eid (born 1965), American judge
- Amera Eid, Australian bellydancer of Egyptian origin
- Basem Eid (born 1990), Egyptian football player
- Bassem Eid (born 1958), Palestinian political analyst
- Daniel Eid (born 1998), Norwegian football player
- Emile Eid (1925–2009), Lebanese Maronite Catholic bishop
- Fernando Eid (born 1992), Bolivian journalist
- Florence Eid-Oakden (died 2022), Lebanese economist
- François Eid (born 1943), Lebanese Maronite bishop
- Gamal Eid (born 1964), Egyptian human rights activist and lawyer
- George Eid (born 1985), Lebanese senior journalist
- Khaled Al-Eid (born 1969), Saudi Arabian equestrian
- Khamis Eid (born 1966), Bahraini football player
- Mahmoud Eid (born 1993), Swedish football player
- Mansour Eid (1944–2013), Lebanese writer
- Marjan Eid (born 1979), Bahraini football manager
- Mohamed Eid (born 1987), Saudi Arabian football player
- Odette Eid (1922–2019), Brazilian sculptor of Lebanese origin
- Rabab Eid (born 1990), Egyptian wrestler
- Rifaat Eid (born 1977), Lebanese politician
- Saber Eid (1959–2025), Egyptian football player
- Souzan El-Eid, American breast surgical oncologist
- Suliman Eid (1961–2025), Egyptian actor and comedian
- Troy Eid (born 1963), American lawyer
- Wissam Eid (1976–2008), Lebanese intelligence official
- Yumna Al-Eid (born 1935), Lebanese writer and literary critic

== Given name ==
- Eid Dahiyat (born 1945), Jordanian politician
- Eid Al-Farsi (born 1990), Omani football player
- Eid Al-Fayez (1945–2025), Jordanian politician
- Eid Hathaleen (born 1983 or 1984), Palestinian artist and activist
- Eid Hourany (1940–2008), French–Lebanese nuclear physicist
- Sabit Dudu, full name Eid Sabbit Dudu Damor (1930–2022), Sudanese footballer
