= Eid =

Eid as a name may refer to:

== Islamic holidays ==
An Eid is a Muslim religious festival:

- Eid al-Fitr (عيد الفطر ʿĪd al-Fiṭr, "Feast of Breaking the Fast"), marks the end of the month of Ramadan
- Eid al-Adha (عيد الأضحى ʿĪd al-ʾAḍḥā, "Feast of the Sacrifice"), falls on the 10th day of Dhu al-Hijjah and lasts for four days until the 13th day
- Eid-e-Milad an-Nabi, alternate name for Mawlid (مَولِد), the date of observance of the birthday of the Islamic prophet Muhammad

In addition, Shia Muslims may observe:

- Eid al-Ghadir, an Eid for Shia Muslims which marks the nomination of Ali, Mohammed's cousin, as the successor of Muħammad
- Eid al-Mubahila, an Eid for Shia Muslims which marks the success of Muslims in a peaceful debate with the Christians of the time

== People ==
- Eid (name), list of people with the name

== Places ==
=== Bangladesh ===
- Eidgarh Union, Cox's Bazar District, Bangladesh
- Eidgaon Upazila, Cox's Bazar District, Bangladesh

=== Norway ===
- Eid Municipality (Hordaland), a former municipality in the old Hordaland county
- Eid Municipality (Møre og Romsdal), a former municipality in Møre og Romsdal county
- Eid Municipality (Sogn og Fjordane), a former municipality in the old Sogn og Fjordane county

=== Scotland ===
- Eid, the Shetland dialect name for Aith, Shetland

== See also ==
- EID (disambiguation)
