= Eidgarh Union =

Eidgarh Union ঈদগড় ইউনিয়ন
- Union Council
- No. 1 Eidgarh Union Council
- Location in Bangladesh
- Country: Bangladesh
- Division: Chittagong Division
- District: Cox's Bazar District
- Upazila: Ramu Upazila

Government
  - Chairman: Firoz Ahammad Bhutto
  - MP (Cox's Bazar-3): Lutfur Rahman Kajal

Population
  - Total: 19,364
- Demonym: Eidgarhi
- Time zone: UTC+6 (BST)
- Website: eidgharup.coxsbazar.gov.bd

Eidgarh Union Council (Bengali: ঈদগড় ইউনিয়ন পরিষদ) is a Union Parishad under Ramu Upazila of Cox's Bazar District in the Chittagong Division of Bangladesh. It has an area of 49.37 square kilometres and a population of 19,364.

== Geography ==
Eidgarh Union is located in the Ramu Upazila. It borders Baishari Union (Naikhongchhari Upazila) in the west, Garjania Union (Garjania Reserve Forest) in the south and Khuntakhali Union (Chakaria Upazila) in the north and east. It has an area of 52 square kilometres.

== History ==
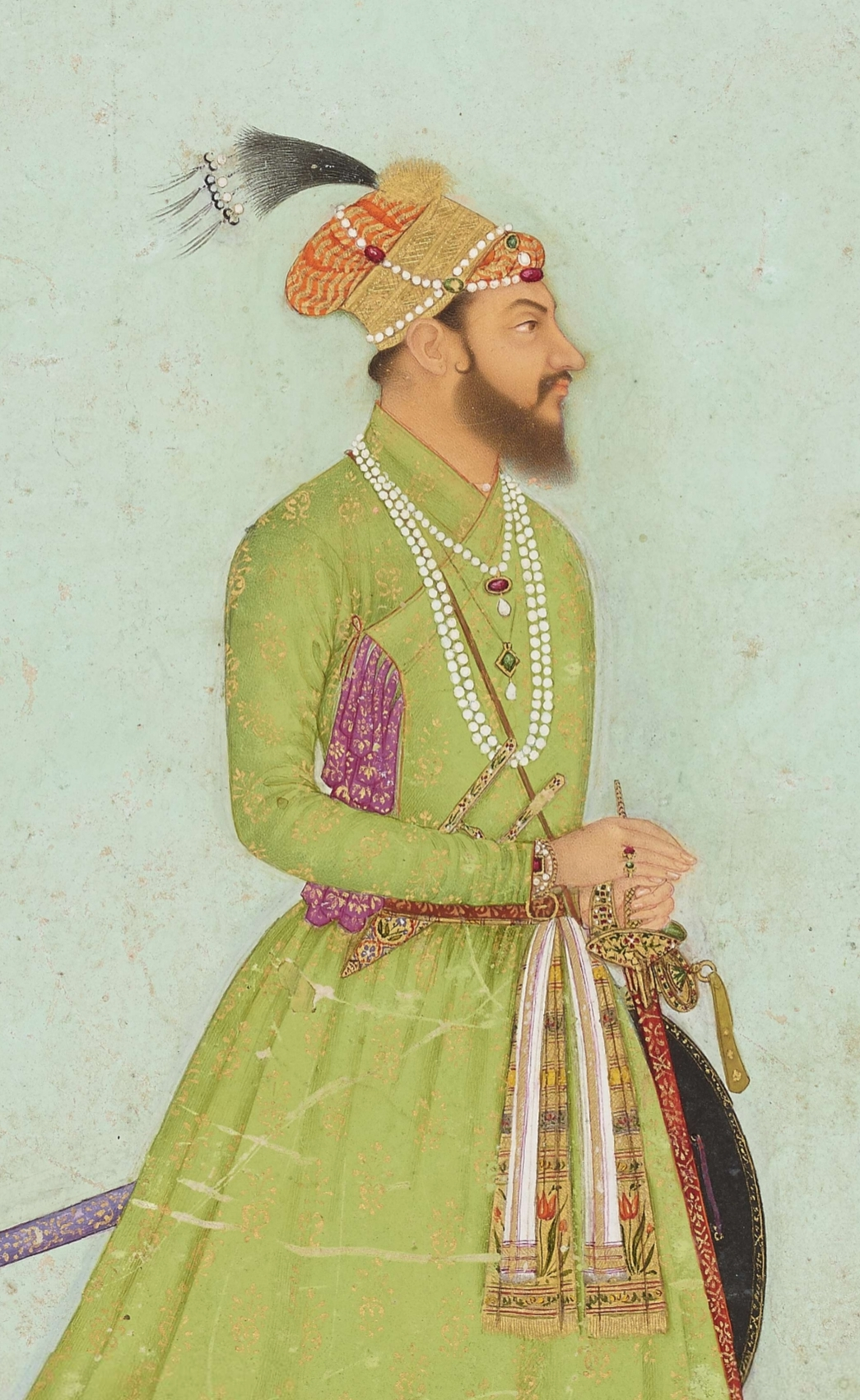
Portrait of Prince Shah Shuja by Lalchand c. 1652

Eidgarh is a locality situated east of the Greater Eidgaon region of southern Chittagong. The origins of its name traces back to the mid-17th century during the Mughal Empire. Following his defeat in the Mughal war of succession against his brother Aurangzeb Alamgir, Prince Shah Shuja (second son of Emperor Shah Jahan and a former Subahdar of Bengal Subah) fled eastward with his forces and retinue toward Arakan. Shah Shuja's route took him through parts of southeastern Bengal, including the area then known as Nayabad (encompassing what is now Eidgaon Upazila and neighboring unions such as Chowfaldandi and Varuakhali). On the day of Eid al-Fitr, Shah Shuja and his party passed through Nayabad and performed Eid prayer there. This significant event led to the area being renamed Eidgaon, meaning "the village of Eid" or "Eid village," commemorating the observance of the post-Ramadan festival in that location. Local oral traditions and elders have associated the specific site of these prayers with an ancient eidgah (open-air prayer ground) in the village of Yusuferkhil within Islamabad. The neighboring hilly forests to the east of Eidgaon subsequently became known as Eidgarh, interpreted as "the fort of Eid" (from "Eid" + "garh," meaning fort or stronghold in Perso-Bengali nomenclature). The Mughal prince's temporary encampment or defensive posture in the forested hills evoked the idea of a "fort" linked to the Eid observance.

On 25 November 1971, amid the broader armed Bangladesh Liberation War struggle against the Pakistan Army, 50 freedom fighters from Eidgarh engaged Pakistani soldiers in combat. The encounter resulted in the killing of 16 Pakistani troops, while the Eidgarhi fighters suffered one martyr and five wounded.

== Demography ==
Eidgarh has a population of 19,364.

== Administration ==
Eidgarh constitutes the no. 1 union council of Ramu Upazila. It contains 39 villages and 2 mouzas.

1. Shiqdar Para
2. Hasnakata
3. Eidgarh
4. Barabil
5. Kodalia Kata
6. Panisya Ghona
7. Jangal Eidgarh
8. Sagira Kata

=== List of chairmen ===
Name	Term	Notes
Riliph Kabir	1971-1974	
Badi Ahammad	1974-1978	
Nurul Islam Bengali	1978-1992	
Dr. Jamal Uddin Shah	1992-1997	
Nurul Islam Bengali	1997-2002	Second term
Dr. Jamal Uddin Shah	2002-2011	Second term
Firoz Ahammad Bhutto	2011-present	

== Education and culture ==
The Union has 5 primary schools and 1 high school. There are 41 mosques and five dakhil madrasas: Badar Maqam Jamiah Firdawsiyyah Dakhil Madrasah, Darul Uloom Islami Ibtidayi Madrasah, Muhammad Sharif Para Rahmaniyyah Nurani Academy, Char Para Nurani Talimul Qur'an Madrasah and Shiqdar Para Hafiziyyah Darul Uloom Madrasah. There are two orphanages in Eidgarh: Eidgarh Hafiziyyah Madrasah & Orphanage and Eidgarh Char Para Nurani Madrasah & Orphanage. Eidgarhis converse in their native Chittagonian dialect but can also converse in Standard Bengali. Languages such as Arabic and English are also taught in schools. The Union contains many mosques and eidgahs.
