= Mohammad Khalequzzaman =

Bangladeshi politician

- মোহাম্মদ খালেকুজ্জামান

Member of Parliament from Cox's Bazar-3
- In office 15 February 1996 – 2001
- Preceded by: Mostaq Ahmad Chowdhury
- Succeeded by: Mohammad Sahiduzzaman

Personal details
- Born: Cox's Bazar District
- Died: 28 September 2001 Cox's Bazar District
- Party: Bangladesh Nationalist Party
- Relations: Mohammad Sahiduzzaman (brother)
- Parent: Farid Ahmad

Mohammad Khalequzzaman was a Bangladesh Nationalist Party politician. He was elected a member of parliament from Cox's Bazar-3 in February 1996 and June 1996.

== Biography ==
Mohammad Khalequzzaman was born in Cox's Bazar District. His father Farid Ahmad was a member of the then National Assembly of Pakistan and Union Minister of Labor. Mother Rizia Ahmed. His younger brother Mohammad Sahiduzzaman was a Member of Parliament from Cox's Bazar-3 constituency.

Mohammad Khalequzzaman was a lawyer. He was elected to parliament from Cox's Bazar-3 as a Bangladesh Nationalist Party candidate in 15 February 1996 and 12 June 1996 Bangladeshi general election.

In the fifth national election of 1991, he was defeated as a BNP candidate from Cox's Bazar-3 (Sadar-Ramu) constituency.

Mohammad Khalequzzaman died on 28 September 2001. He died on the last day of election campaign. He was heavily favoured to win the election on 1 October 2001. After his death Lutfar Rahman Kazal(current MP) got the nomination.But after heavy protests by his supporters. The Nomination was given to His brother Engineer Shahiduzzaman. By elections were held on 1 November 2001. Shahiduzzaman got 93 percent of the total votes cast beating his nearest candidate by a margin of 106,720 votes.

Khalequzzaman studied from IBA,Dhaka University. He was a lawyer by profession. He was also a computer expert.
