= Jalalabad Union, Eidgaon =

Jalalabad জালালাবাদ ইউনিয়ন
- Union Council
- Jalalabad Union Council
- Location in Bangladesh
- Country: Bangladesh
- Division: Chittagong Division
- District: Cox's Bazar District
- Upazila: Eidgaon Upazila

Government
  - Chairman: Imrul Hasan Rashed
  - MP (Cox's Bazar-3): Lutfur Rahman Kajal

Area
  - Total: 11.2 km^{2} (4.3 sq mi)

Population
  - Total: 17,037
  - Density: 1,520/km^{2} (3,940/sq mi)
- Demonym: Jalalabadi
- Time zone: UTC+6 (BST)
- Website: jalalabadup.coxsbazar.gov.bd

Jalalabad Union (Bengali: জালালাবাদ ইউনিয়ন) is a Union Parishad under Eidgaon Upazila of Cox's Bazar District in the Chittagong Division of Bangladesh. It has an area of 11.2 square kilometres and a population of 17,037.

== History ==
The Jalalabad Union was founded in 1992, after the partition of Eidgaon Union.

== Geography ==
The total area size of Jalalabad Union is 11.2 km^{2}

Location of Islamabad Union in Eidgaon Upazila. The distance of the union from the upazila headquarters is about 27 km. Eidgaon Union and Jalalabad Union on the south, Pokhkhali Union on the west, Islampur Union, Eidgaon Upazila, Islampur Union and Chakaria Upazila Khutakhali Union and formerly Ramu Upazila Eidgar Union is located.

== Administrative structure ==
The Jalalabad Union Parishad under Eidgaon Upazila. The administrative activities of the union are under the Eidgaon Upazila. This is a part of the union Cox's Bazar-3 Constituency constituency of the Jatiya Sangsad and the constituency of Cox's Bazar-3 of 296 constituencies.

The Villages are categorised into nine Wards are

Ward No	Villages
1	Jalalabad Bazar, Telipara (Saudagarpara), Machhuapara
2	East Larabag, Chhatipara, Hindupara, Idrispur
3	South Larabak
4	Khamarpara, Mianjipara
5	Farazipara
6	Baharcherra
7	Mohanbila South
8	South Palakata
9	North Palakata

== Culture ==
Jalalabad is home to 31 mosques, 2 dakhil madrasas, 1 qaumi madrasa, 10 nurani madrasa and one ibtedayi madrasa. The literacy rate is 40.2% as of the 2011 census.

== Chairmen ==
List of Chairman

Serial No	Chairman's Name	Duration
01	Alhaj Amanullah Faraizi	
02	Alhaj Amanullah Faraizi	
03	Alhaj Faridul Alam	
04	Alhaj Amanullah Faraizi	
05	Imrul Hasan Rashed	Present
