= Farid Ahmad =

Pakistani politician, lawyer, and vice-president of Pakistan Democratic Party

- ফরিদ আহমদ
- Born: 3 January 1923; Chittagong District, Bengal Presidency, British India
- Died: 23 December 1971 (aged 48); Dacca, Bangladesh
- Cause of death: Murder
- Years active: 1947-1971
- Political party: Pakistan Peace and Welfare Council
- Other political affiliations: Pakistan Democratic Party; Nizam-e-Islam Party
- Children: Mohammad Khalequzzaman; Mohammad Sahiduzzaman

Farid Ahmad was a Pakistani politician, lawyer, and vice-president of the Pakistan Democratic Party (PDP).

== Early life ==
Ahmad was born on 3 January 1923 in Rashid Nagar, Ramu Upazila, Cox's Bazar District, East Bengal, British Raj. He completed his Matriculation from Cox's Bazar Government High School. He finished his I.A. from Chittagong Government College. In 1945, he graduated with B.A. in the English language from the University of Dhaka. He completed his M.A. from the University of Dhaka in 1946. In 1947, he completed his LLB degree.

== Career ==
Ahmad was elected vice-president of Dhaka University Central Student Union. In 1952, he joined the Nizam-e-Islam Party. In 1954, he was elected to the Provincial Assembly of East Bengal and in 1955, he was elected to the Pakistan Constituent Assembly. From 1954 to 1969, he was the general secretary of the Nizam-e-Islam Party. He served as the chief whip of the East Bengal Provincial Assembly. He served in the cabinet of Ismail Ibrahim Chundrigar as the Minister of Labour. In 1962, he was elected to the National Assembly of Pakistan. He served as the chairman of Public Accounts Committee in the National Assembly till 1965. In 1964, he was elected chairman of Combined Opposition Party in East Pakistan. He was reelected to the Pakistan National Assembly in 1965.

In 1965, Ahmad wrote a book on Muhammad Ali, titled Muhammad Ali Clay. He was the advisory editor of Prithibi, a monthly magazine. In 1967, he joined the Pakistan Democratic Movement and campaigned against President Ayub Khan. During February 1969 and March 1969, he attended the Round Table Conference by Ayub Khan as the representative of the Nizam-e-Islam Party. He was elected the vice-president of Pakistan Democratic Party in 1969. In 1971, he represented Pakistan at the Afro-Asian People's Solidarity Organisation in Damascus, Syria. He served as the managing editor of The Daily Najat. He lost his seat in the 1970 Pakistani general election. He supported Pakistan during the Bangladesh War of Independence. On 10 April 1971, he helped form the East Pakistan Central Peace Committee in Dhaka and was a founding member of the committee. He served as the president of East Pakistan Peace and Welfare Council. He was an adviser to the paramilitary Razakar Bahini.

== Death ==
Ahmad was killed on 23 December 1971, after the independence of Bangladesh by people affiliated with the Mukti Bahini.
