= Khebez Dawle =

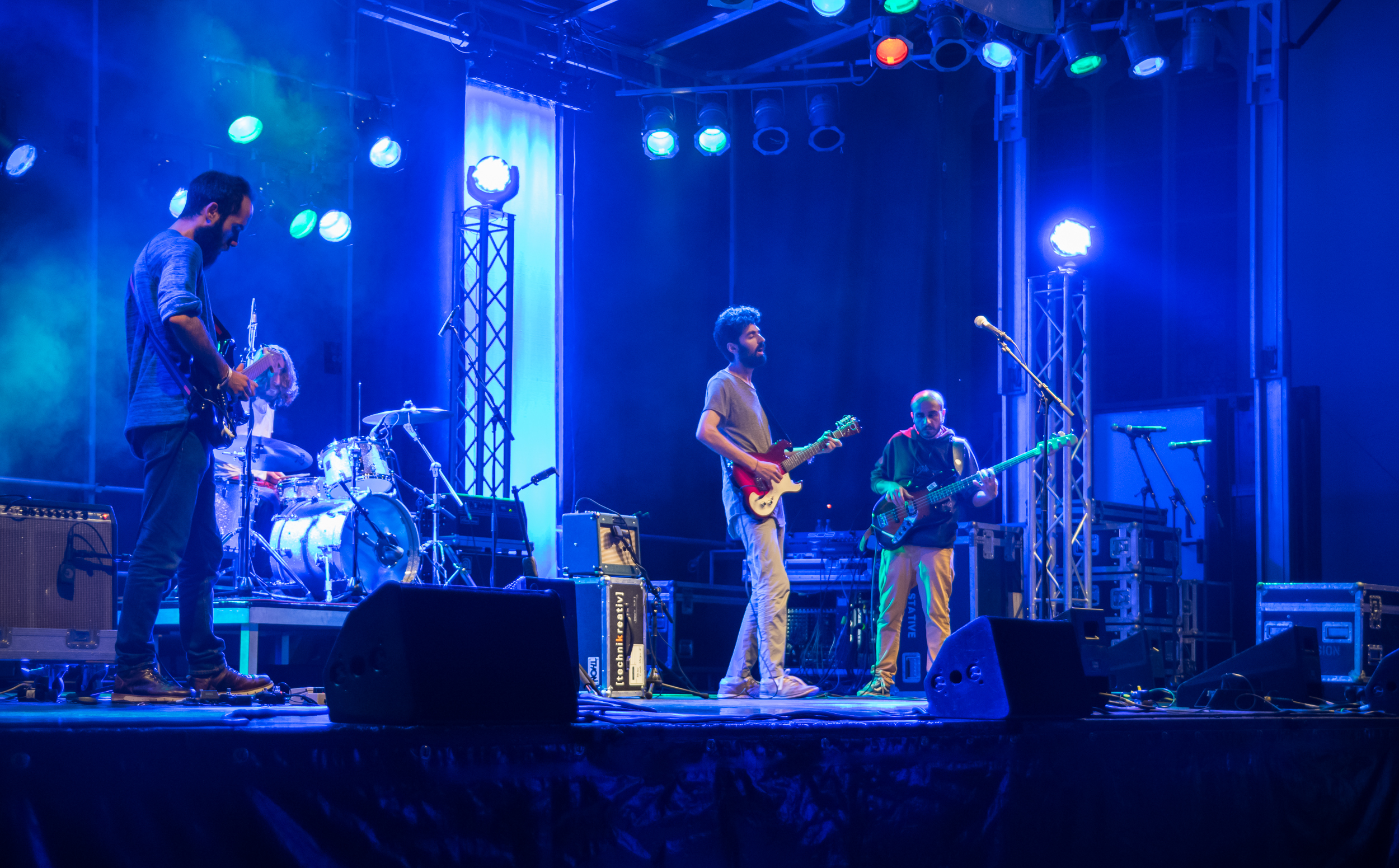
- Khebez Dawle performing at "Detmolder Sommerbühne 2016" in Detmold, Germany.

Background information
- Origin: Damascus, Syria; Beirut, Lebanon
- Genres: Ambient; post-rock; indie rock
- Years active: 2012–present
- Members: Anas Maghrebi; Muhammad Bazz; Hikmat Qassar; Bashar Darwish; Dani Shukri
- Website: www.khebezdawle.com

Khebez Dawle (Arabic خبز دولة, lit. 'Government Bread') is a Syrian post-rock band led by Anas Maghrebi. As of 2017, the band is based in Berlin. While the band members are war refugees, they prefer to see themselves as simply a rock band.

== Formation and flight ==
Anas Maghrebi's previous band, Ana (Arabic أنا, lit. "I"), was formed following the uprisings that occurred as a result of the Arab Spring, was torn apart following the murder of the drummer of his bandmate, Rabea al-Ghazzi, and the drafting of the guitarist of the band into the army.

In 2012, Anas Maghrebi formed Khebez Dawle in the midst of the Syrian Uprising. Before the war, the band had been active underground because of Syrian censorship. As the Syrian Civil War ensued, the band opted at first to wait it out, while each individual was simultaneously trying to avoid conscription into the Syrian army. Bazz, Qassar, and Darwish fled Syria for Lebanon, and Maghrebi followed in 2013. Meanwhile, drummer Shukri had been active in the Lebanese scene since 2011 with the band Tanjaret Daghet.

After spending two years in Beirut, though the band had managed to record a limited pressing of their new album, they deemed staying in Lebanon as having no future for them.

== In motion ==
Thereafter, the band moved to Turkey, from where they made the perilous boat trip with twelve other refugee musicians on a dinghy of sixteen souls across the Aegean Sea to the Greek island of Lesbos. From Greece, they moved through Macedonia, Serbia, and Croatia.

Throughout their journey, the band used their records to pay (in part) for their trips, and even presented their records as identification.

According to some sources, the band's first performance in Europe was playing in a refugee camp.

Khebez Dawle did their first substantial European gig in Croatia's capital Zagreb at Klub Močvara (lit. "Club of the Swamp"), a popular cultural venue that in the past had hosted Mogwai and God is an Astronaut. The men were asked by activists to perform at a concert supporting refugees. At the sold-out club event, the bandmates played with borrowed instruments to a full house largely attended by Croatians.

Subsequently, Khebez Dawle got invitations to play two shows in Austria, and then performed in Cologne, Germany on New Year's Eve of 31 December 2015.

== Germany ==
After arrival to Germany, the band members were known in March 2016 to await for a response about their status in Germany's former Berlin Tempelhof Airport, which had been repurposed into a large shelter and housing unit for migrants. During that time, the group toured and performed their music around Germany. As of late September 2017, the band members' refugee status has since been confirmed.

=== Konzerthaus Berlin performance ===
On 15 February 2016, Khebez Dawle performed in Konzerthaus Berlin on Gendarmenmarkt as part of the 'Cinema For Peace' charity gala, which was attended by many German celebrities. The Chinese artist Ai Weiwei had created an installation, in which the classicistic columns of the concert house were dressed in two thousand rescue vests from the island Lesbos. In addition, the attendant members of the public and celebrities were dressed in those same rescue vests and also thermal blankets. The totality of the installation was seen as tasteless. As the band had literally gone through the experience of crossing the perilous seas in the same vests that effectively saved their lives, one band member reacted to the installation by leaving a smashed guitar on the stage. Subsequently, the band members explained understanding of Ai Weiwei's art, but they countered this by describing seeing the rescue vests again as a terrible nightmare:

From his [Ai Weiwei's] perspective, it is art, a message, that something is happening. But for others, it can be a nightmare to see the rescue vests again. I hated it, that people shot selfies; it is horrific, when one has experienced the danger themselves. All the extravagant people, that had only been waiting to speak and to be seen before a camera — it was so laughable.

— Bashar [sic]

We have not spoken about it since the concert till today [23 April 2016]. You know, when you wait out there and want to play music, and you see these people in rescue vests, and they drink sparkling wine, and you know that this vest once saved your life, and you know this trip and these people who have crossed the sea — this feels really horrific.

— Bazz

=== lit.COLOGNE festival ===
In March 2016, they performed on the stage of Cologne's Lanxess Arena alongside major German literary and musical luminaries at the lit.COLOGNE benefit festival for the Til Schweiger Foundation, which seeks to serve as a less bureaucratic means to quickly aid newly arrived refugees.

=== Counter Speech Tour ===
Between 27 April — 4 May 2016, Khebez Dawle and Leslie Clio headlined the Counter Speech Tour that visited six cities across Germany: Passau, Cologne, Münster, Freital, Wismar, and Flensburg. In specific cities, the tour featured special guest performers: Enno Bunger, Gleis 8, and Smudo (of the rap group Die Fantastischen Vier).

The purpose of the tour was to work as a friendly measure to counter racism and extreme-right ideologies that had taken root in some of these cities, and specifically in Freital.

The tour was sponsored by Facebook, and organised in partnership with, inter alia, Warner Music Group, the German brewer fritz-kola, the Bundesliga Foundation, and the Internet charity betterplace.org. The project at betterplace.org to support the tour managed to collect €5167 from 134 donations.

=== Detmolder Sommerbühne ===
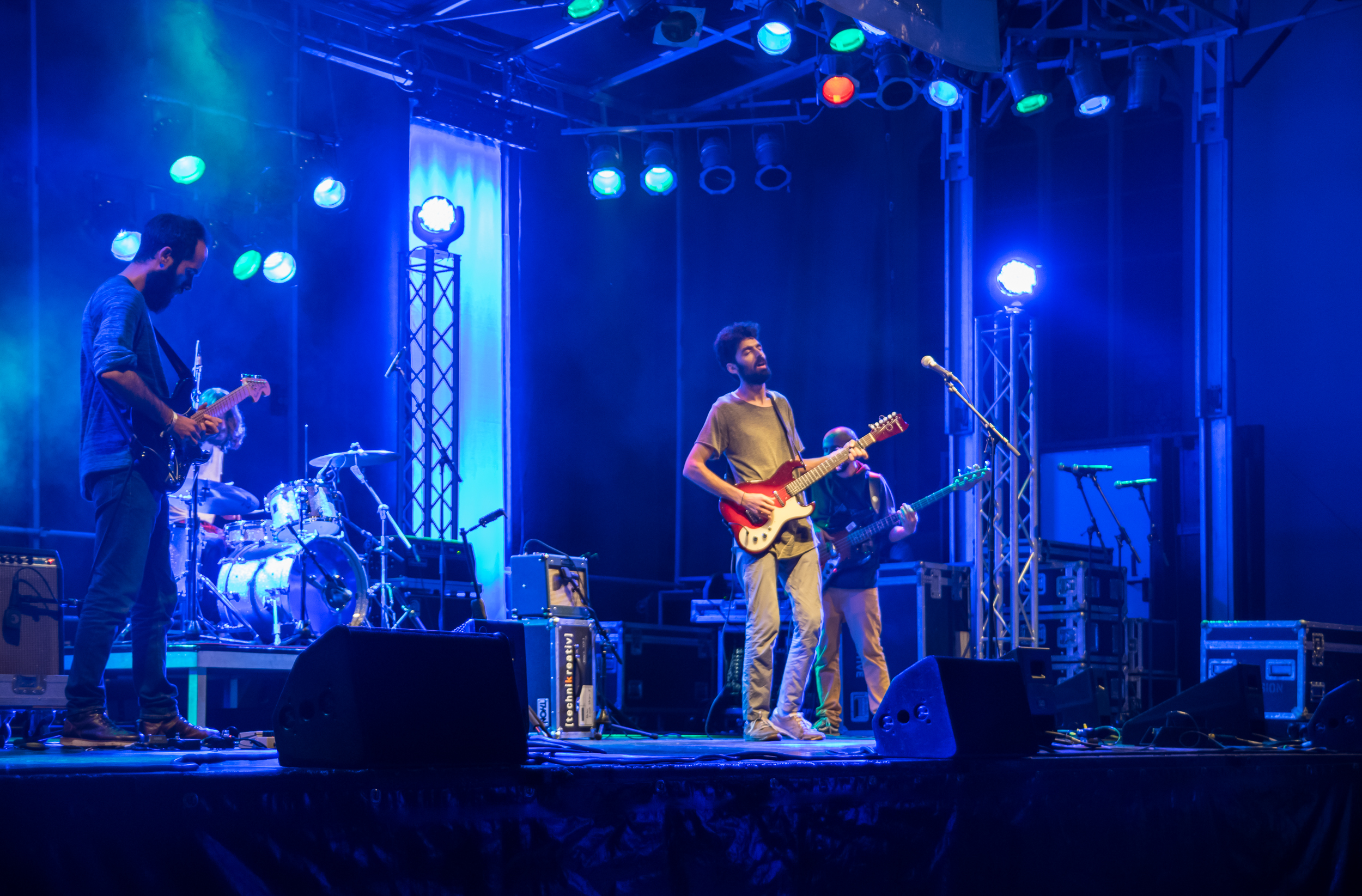
The band at Detmolder Sommerbühne

On 12 August 2016, Khebez Dawle performed at Detmolder Sommerbühne 2016, a summer stage event in Detmold, Germany. The performance was well-received, and after requests for more Arabic-language songs from the listening public, Khebez Dawle frontman and vocalist Anas Maghrebi emerged from the listening area to then support the four-person Bukahara group in their performance.

=== 2017 ===
By 2017, Khebez Dawle have become firmly located in Berlin. As of January 2017, German-American journalist and filmmaker Emily Dische-Becker has been working on a documentary about the band's journey. In February, the band were reported to be working on a new album.

== Lineup ==
- Anas Maghrebi — lead vocals, guitar, percussion instruments
- Bachi Darwish — vocals, guitar
- Muhammad Bazz — bass
- Hekmat Qassar — keyboards, guitar
- Dani Shukri — drums

Source: Stepfeed

== First Album: Khebez Dawle ==
Funded by the Arab Fund for Art and Culture and the Arab Culture Resource Khebez Dawle's self titled first album was released in August, 2015. Recording for the album started 1 May 2014. The album follows the perspective of a young Syrian man who is experiencing various events throughout the Syrian war such as the Arab Spring. As states on Khebez Dawle's website, "this album tells the story from a humanitarian point of view, away from any polarizing political alignment".

== Discography ==
Released	Title	Language	Track listing
2015	Khebez Dawle	Arabic	1. Khebez Dawle; 2. Seen Sua'al (Interlude); 3. Tawdeeh; 4. Beta'ammer; 5. Manam; 6. Ahbal; 7. Ya Sah; 8. Belsharea'; 9. Aayesh; 10. Ma Aad Beddo; 11. Haki Bani Aadami
