= Saleha Khanam =

Bangladeshi politician

- ছালেহা খানম

Member of the Bangladesh Parliament for Reserved Women's Seat–30 (South Chittagong)
- In office 2 April 1979 – 24 March 1982
- Preceded by: Position created

Personal details
- Born: Dhemushia, Cox's Bazar, Bengal
- Died: April 24, 2025 (aged 82–83) Evercare Hospital Dhaka, Bangladesh
- Party: Bangladesh Nationalist Party
- Children: Lutfur Rahman Kazal

Saleha Khanam (1942 – 24 April 2025; Bengali: ছালেহা খানম) was a Bangladesh Nationalist Party politician and the former Member of Bangladesh Parliament of women's reserved seat.

== Early life and family ==
Khanam was born in 1942 as the fourth of the eleven children of Haji Abdul Jalil in Dhemushia Union, Cox's Bazar subdivision, then part of the Chittagong District of Bengal. She was married to industrialist Alhaj Mustafizur Rahman of Gomatali, the founder of the Niribili Group. MP Lutfur Rahman Kazal is her son.

== Career ==
Khanam was elected to parliament from women's reserved seat as a Bangladesh Nationalist Party candidate in 1979.

== Death ==
Khanam died on 24 April 2025 at the Evercare Hospital Dhaka.
