= Bteddine el-Loqch =

Bteddine el-Loqch بتدين اللقش Btaddin al-Loqsh
- Municipality
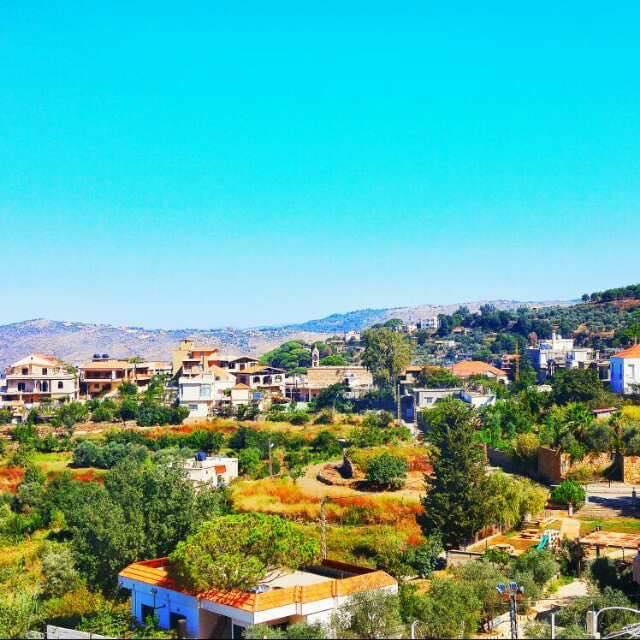
- Bteddine Municipality from Roof

- Location within Lebanon
- Coordinates: 33°34′08″N 35°33′28″E
- Country: Lebanon
- Governorate: South Lebanon Governorate
- District: Jezzine District

Area
  - Total: 3.2 km^{2} (1.2 sq mi)
- Elevation: 830 m (2,720 ft)
- Highest elevation: 1,010 m (3,310 ft)
- Lowest elevation: 740 m (2,430 ft)
- Time zone: UTC+2 (EET)
  - Summer (DST): UTC+3 (EEST)
- Dialing code: +961

Bteddine el-Loqch, Btaddine el-Loqsh, Btaddine al-Lokch, Btaddine al-Loqsh, (Arabic:بتدين اللقش; also spelled Bteddine el-Liqch) is a municipality in South Lebanon Governorate, Lebanon.

== Etymology ==
The word Bteddine is believed to mean "house of religion" or "house of law". The word "El Loqch" (in spoken Lebanese, the pine tree pulp) was added in the 19th century by Emir Bashir Shihab II in order to differentiate the village from the town of Beit ed-Dine, capital of the Emirate of Mount Lebanon.

== Geography ==
Overlooking the Mediterranean Sea and the "Bisri" Valley, the village is 71 km (44.12 mi) away from Beirut and 28 km (17.40 mi) kilometers away from Saida and it is stretches between 740 m and 1010 m above sea level. It extends over an area of 3.2 Km2 surrounded by pine trees. It is limited at the North by the village "El Harf", at the South by the village "EL Homsiye", at the west by the villages "Al Beba" and "Taid" and at the East by the village "Sabbah".

=== Climate ===
Its temperate climate is like most of the mountainous Lebanese villages. Bteddine El Loqch gains an average of 1040 mm (40.94 in) of rainfall per year.

Month	High Temp (°C)	Low Temp (°C)
January	12	5
February	12	5
March	14	7
April	17	9
May	20	12
June	23	16
July	25	18
August	25	19
September	24	18
October	22	15
November	18	10
December	14	7
source 1 = NOAA (US)

== History & Landmarks ==
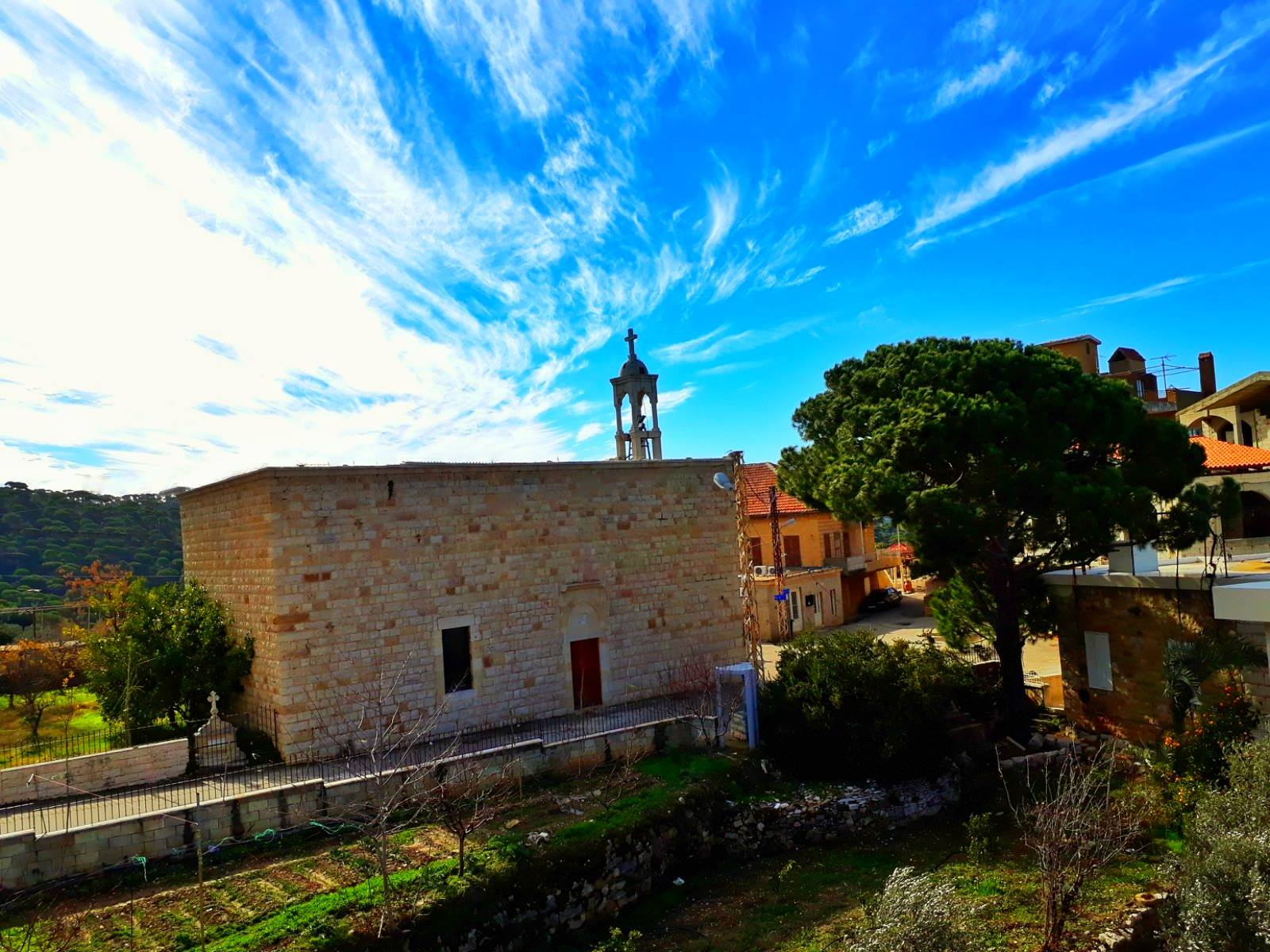
Bteddine Church

An ancient grave dating from the Roman Empire, also known as "الناووس", is located to the north east of the village.

Bteddine El Loqch has an ancient church dedicated to Saint Joseph and dating from the 19th century. and lies few miles away from the Convent of Our Lady of Machmouche, one of the most important Maronite monasteries in Lebanon.

== Municipality ==
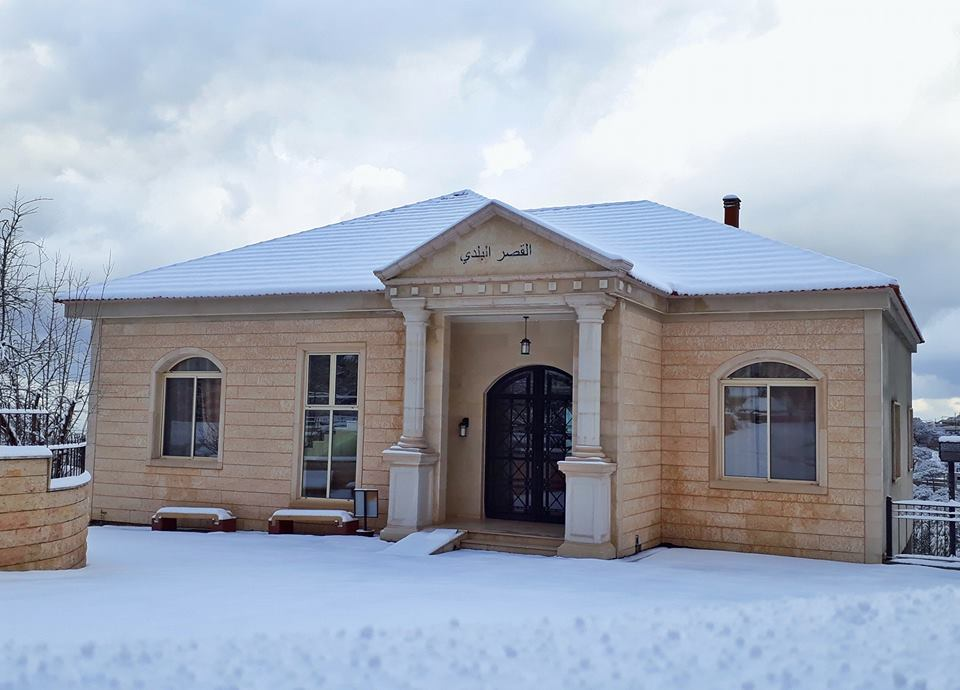
Bteddine Municipality

Phone Number : +961 07 800 196

It is run by a town council consisted of 9 members elected on the 24th of May 2025 :

- Charles Kattar : Mayor - رئيس البلدية
- Iyad Atallah : Deputy Mayor - نائب الرئيس
- Zeina Salameh
- Rony Akl
- Ralph Eid
- Carla El Azar Eid
- Samar Kattar
- Jad Akl
- Fady Eid

And one Mukhtar "Elias Bou Sleiman"

They are elected every 6 years .

== Demographics ==
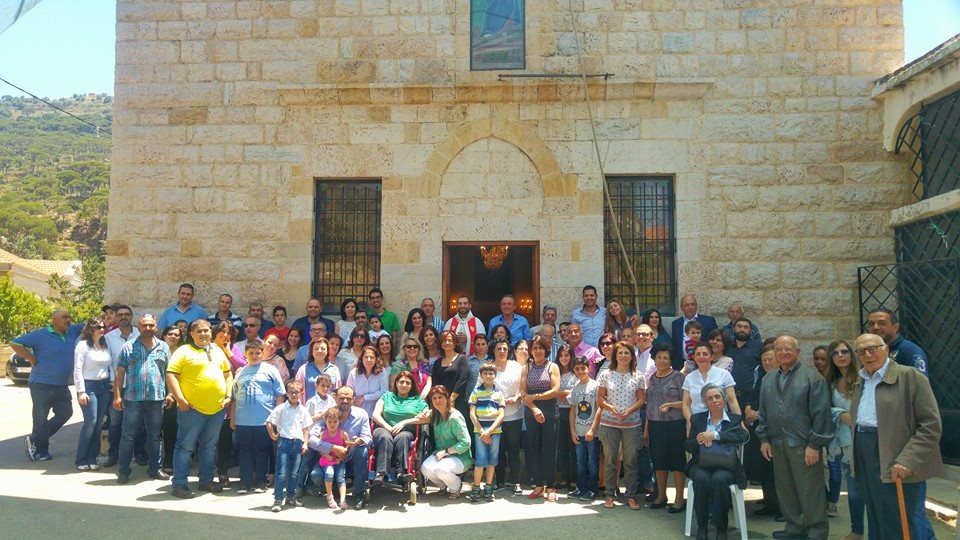
Bteddine Big Family

In 2014, Christians made up 99.29% of registered voters in Bteddine el-Loqch. 92.14% of the voters were Maronite Catholics.

The number of registered citizens reaches 755people, with the majority belonging to the Maronite confession. The town counts 80 houses and 10 shops and commercial institutions. The most common family names are: "Kattar", "Abou Sleiman", "Eid", "Sayegh", "Abou Samra", "Akl", "Abi Nader".

== Cultural & Sports Club ==
Founded by a Committee in 1964, its first president was Mansour Eid, then followed by Samir Al Hajj, Nabil Kattar, Raif Kattar, Wajdi Kattar, Joe Eid, Ziad Atallah, Roger Abou Sleiman, Walid Karam, Charles Kattar, Romeo Akl, Talal Karam, Mazen Abou Samra and Christina Keryakos.

The club managed to create a Public Library containing a large variety of historical, intellectual and literary value books. It also published the first edition of the magazine "الكتاب" (Al-Kitab) in July 1967 and organized many popular festivals and events in the Jezzine region.

== Notable people ==
Mansour Eid (1944–2013), novelist and literary scholar

Samir Atallah (born 1941), journalist and author

Charles Hage (born 1964), telecommunications executive, appointed Lebanese Minister of Telecommunications in 2025

Boulos Salameh (1902–1979), poet and jurist, author of the epic عيد الغدير

Nabil Kattar (1958–2024), long‑serving mayor and civic leader

Dr Elias Kattar, historian, professor at the Lebanese University and author of Bteddine El Loqch: قرية من الجبل اللبناني

Judge Charbel Abou Samra, First Investigating Judge of Beirut in major financial crime cases

== Gallery ==
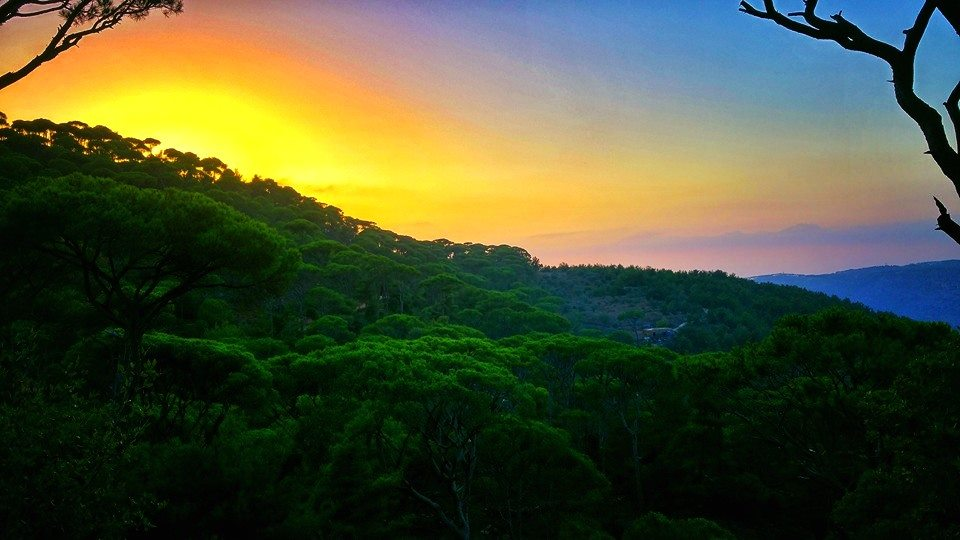
Bteddine in Sunset

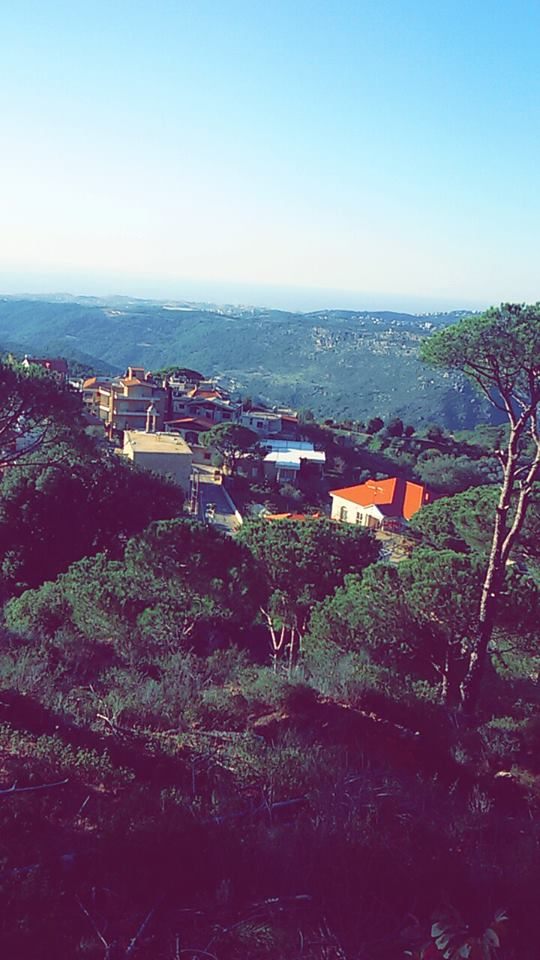
Bteddine Town from Hill

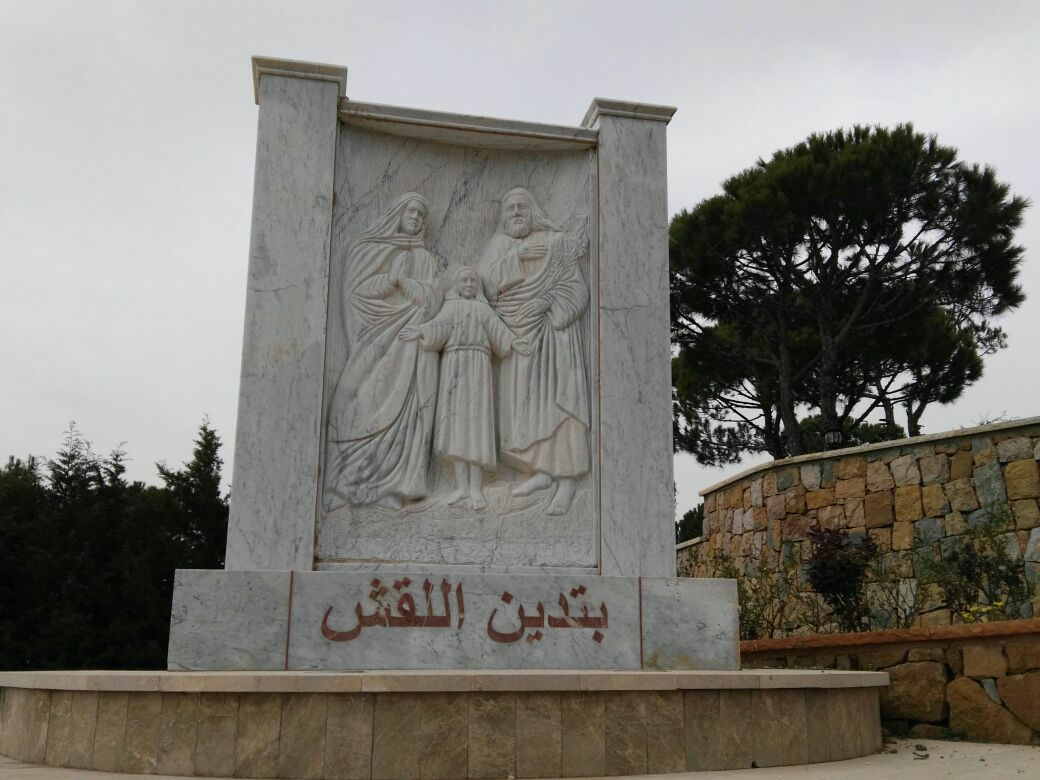
Saint Joseph Stone

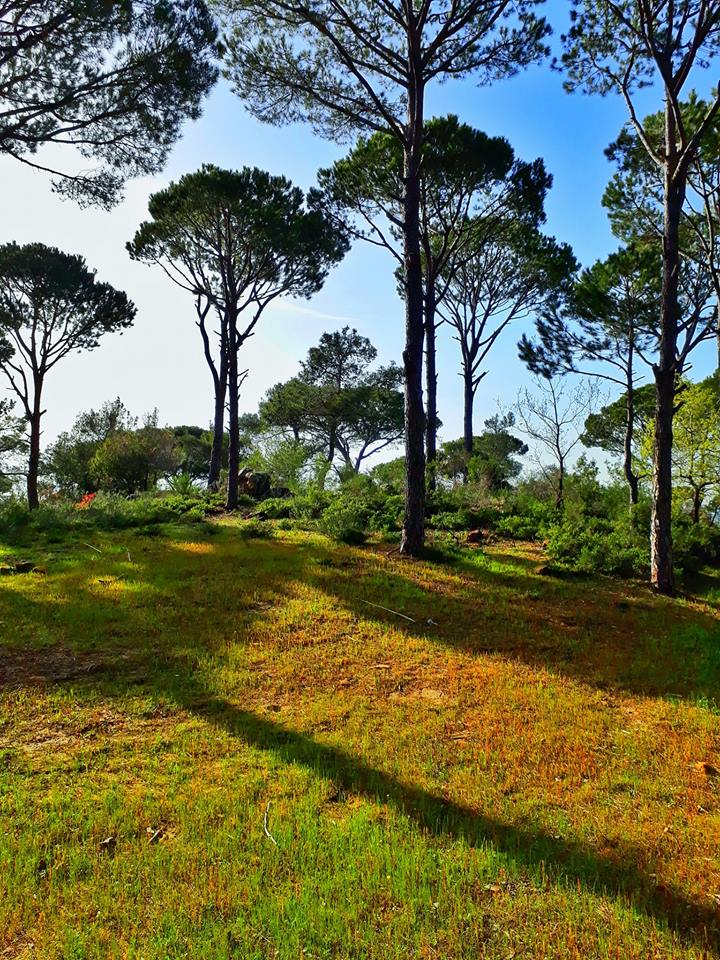
Pines

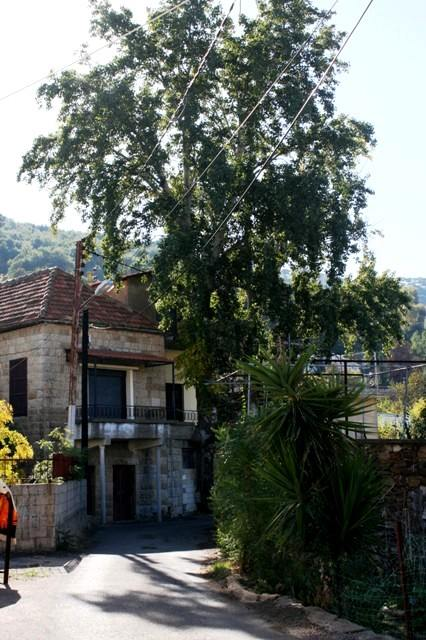
Charles Kattar's House at Bteddine

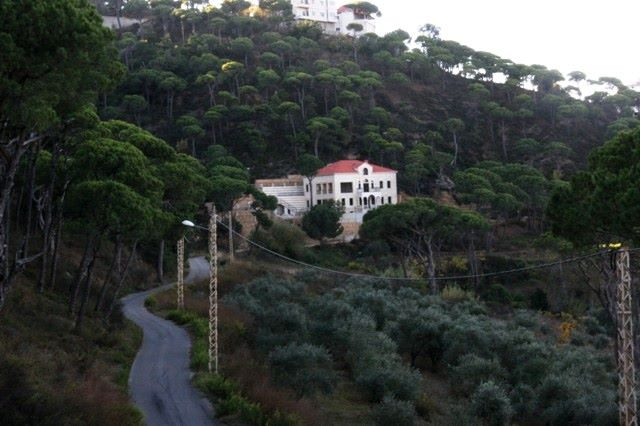
pine forest

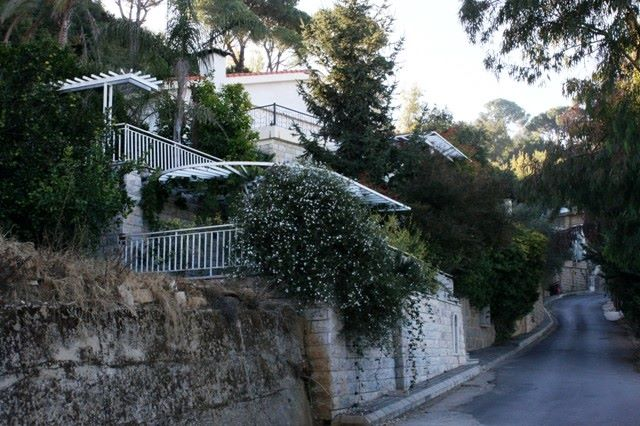
Bteddine photo of houses

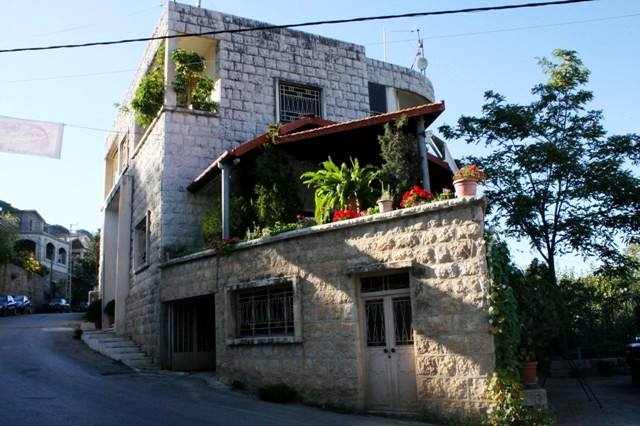
old house
