= Islamabad Union, Eidgaon =

Islamabad Union Porishad ইসলামাবাদ ইউনিয়ন পরিষদ
- Union Council
- Location in Bangladesh
- Coordinates: 21°34′N 92°4′E
- Country: Bangladesh
- Division: Chittagong Division
- District: Cox's Bazar District
- Upazila: Eidgaon Upazila

Government
  - Chairman: Nur Mohammad Siddiq

Area
  - Total: 1,103 km^{2} (426 sq mi)

Population (1991)
  - Total: 29,195
- Time zone: UTC+6 (BST)
- Postal code: 4702
- Website: Website

Islamabad Union (Bengali: ইসলামাবাদ ইউনিয়ন) is a union of Eidgaon Upazila, Cox's Bazar District, Bangladesh.

== History ==
The Greater Eidgaon Union was demolished in 1990 in the union of Islampur Union, Islamabad Union and Jalalabad Union *Eidgaon.

== Geography ==
The total areesize of Islamabad Union is 2726 acres (11.03 km^{2})

Location of Islamabad Union in Eidgaon Upazila. The distance of the union from the upazila headquarters is about 27 km. Eidgaon Union and Jalalabad Union on the south, Pokhkhali Union on the west, Islampur Union, Eidgaon Upazila, Islampur Union and Chakaria Upazila Khutakhali Union and formerly Ramu Upazila Eidgar Union is located.

== Naming ==
Under the name of Nurul Islam, the former acting chairman who dedicated considerable effort to the division of the union Parishad territory, the union has been aptly named "Islamabad."

== Administrative structure ==
The Islamabad Union Parishad under Eidgaon Upazila. The administrative activities of the union are under the Eidgaon Upazila. This is a part of the union Cox's Bazar-3 Constituency constituency of the Jatiya Sangsad and the constituency of Cox's Bazar-3 of 296 constituencies.

The Villages of the Ward-based Union are

Ward No	Name Of Villages
1No Ward	Tekpara
2No Ward	South Pahisiakhali, North Pahiaiakhali, North Lorabak, Sikdarpara
3No Ward	Charpara, Hindupara
4No Ward	West Boalkhali, North Satjulakata, South Satjulakata
5No Ward	Bowddapara, Shantipur, East Boalkhali
6No Ward	Eastern Yusuferkhil, West Yusuferkhil
7No Ward	Khodai Bari, Haripur, Barapara (Banshagata)
8No Ward	Wahedrpara, Awliabad, West Gazalia
9No Ward	West Gazalia, Gazalia, East Gazalia

== Education ==
Islamabad Union's literacy rate is 32.10%. There are 1 secondary school high school, 2 dakhil madrasa, 1 lower secondary school and 12 primary schools in the union.

=== Institutions ===
Secondary school

- Jahan Ara Islam Girl High School

Madrasa;

- Islamabad Nurul Haque Dakhil Madrasa
- Aji Lutful Kabir Adarsha Balika Dakhil Madrasa
- Momtazul Ulum Faridiya Dakhil Madrasa

Lower secondary school

- Eidgah International Residential School and College

Primary school

- Yusuferkhil Government Primary School
- Ichakhali Government Primary School
- Eidgah Charpara Yakub Ali Government Primary School
- Eidgon Tekpara Government Primary School
- North Lorabak Sikdarpara Government Primary School
- Wahederpara Government Primary School
- Gazalia Government Primary School
- West Gazalia Government Primary School
- East Boalkhali Azimuddin Government Primary School
- Pahasiyakhali Government Primary School
- Boalkhali Faujul Karim Government Primary School
- Haripur Ardhendhu registered private primary school

== River and canals ==
Eidgong River is flowing through the southern end of Islamabad Union.

== People's representatives ==
- Present Chairman: Mohammad Noor Siddique

People's representatives list

Name	Designation	Union
Mohammad Nur Siddique	Chairman	Islamabad Union

Designation	Name	Number of Ward
Abdur Razzak	Union Parishad member	Ward no 01
Saiful Islam	Union Parishad member	Ward no.2
Nourchchafa	Union Parishad member	Ward no 03
Omar Mia	Union Parishad member	Ward no 04
Syed Noor Helali	Union Parishad member	Ward no 05
Didarul Islam	Union Parishad member	Ward no 06
Sirajul Islam	Union Parishad member	Ward no 07
Abu Bakar Siddique Bandi	Union Parishad member	Ward no 08
Abdus Shukkur	Union Parishad member	Ward no 09
Nasima Begum	Union Parishad member	Reserved 01
Sitara Begum	Union Parishad member	Reserved 02
Farida Yasmin	Union Parishad member	Reserved 03

List of Chairman

Serial No	Chairman's Name	Duration
01	Mansur Alam	1991-1996
02	Nazrul Islam	1997-2002
03	Zafar Alam	2002-2011
04	Nurul Hoque	2011-2016
05	Mohammad Nur Siddique	2016–Present

== See also ==
- Islamabad Union
- Eidgaon Upazila
- Union of Cox's Bazar districts
