= Shaimum Sarwar Kamal =

Bangladeshi politician, Member of parliament

- সাইমুম সরওয়ার কমল

Member of the Bangladesh Parliament for Cox's Bazar-3
- In office 29 January 2014 – 6 August 2024
- Preceded by: Lutfur Rahman Kajal

Personal details
- Born: 2 January 1970 (age 55)
- Political party: Awami League

Shaimum Sarwar Kamal (born 2 January 1970) is a Bangladeshi politician and a former Jatiya Sangsad member representing the Cox's Bazar-3 constituency. He is the son of former Awami League (AL) leader and diplomat Osman Sarwar Alam Chowdhury. He lost the 2008 election to Bangladesh Nationalist Party candidate Lutfur Rahman Kajal, then won his seat in 2014 as an AL candidate.
