= Ahmed Eid =

Ahmed Eid may refer to:

- Ahmed Eid (swimmer) (born 1960), Egyptian swimmer
- Ahmed Eid (footballer) (born 2001), Egyptian football defender
- Ahmed Eid, Palestinian musician and member of the band Bukahara
