= Didarul Alam Chowdhury =

Bangladeshi diplomat and politician

Member of Bangladesh Parliament

Personal details
- Party: Jatiya Party (Ershad)

Didarul Alam Chowdhury is a Jatiya Party (Ershad) politician and a former member of parliament for Cox's Bazar-3.

== Career ==
Chowdhury was elected to parliament from Cox's Bazar-3 as a Jatiya Party candidate in 1986 and 1988.
