= EID =

EID, an acronym, may refer to:

- Ecological interface design, a framework for designing complex sociotechnical, real-time, and dynamic systems
- Electronic identification, digital systems used for proof of identity
- eUICC identifier, a 32-digit unique identifier of an eUICC eSIM device, representing the identity of a mobile device to a cellular network service provider
- eSIM Identifier, a misnomer for eUICC Identifier
- Emerging infectious disease, an increasingly prevalent infectious disease
- Emotional instability disorder, a psychological condition formerly known as borderline personality disorder

== See also ==
- Eid (disambiguation)
