= Cox's Bazar-3 =

Constituency of Bangladesh's Jatiya Sangsad

Coordinates: 21.44°N 91.97°E

- Constituency for the Jatiya Sangsad
- District: Cox's Bazar District
- Division: Chittagong Division
- Electorate: 535,138 (2026)

Current constituency
- Created: 1984
- Party: Bangladesh Nationalist Party
- Member: Lutfur Rahman Kajal
- ← 295 Cox's Bazar-2 297 Cox's Bazar-4 →

Cox's Bazar-3 is a constituency represented in the Jatiya Sangsad (National Parliament) of Bangladesh since 2026 by Lutfur Rahman Kajal of the Bangladesh Nationalist Party.

== Boundaries ==
The constituency encompasses Cox's Bazar Sadar, Ramu, and Eidgaon upazilas.

== History ==
The constituency was created in 1984 from the Chittagong-17 constituency when the former Chittagong District was split into two districts: Chittagong and Cox's Bazar. The boundaries remained the same.

== Members of Parliament ==
Election	Member	Party
1986	Didarul Alam Chowdhury	Jatiya Party
1991	Mostaq Ahmad Chowdhury	Awami League
Feb 1996	Mohammad Khalequzzaman	Bangladesh Nationalist Party
2001	Mohammad Sahiduzzaman	Bangladesh Nationalist Party
2008	Lutfur Rahman Kajal	Bangladesh Nationalist Party
2014	Shaimum Sarwar Kamal	Awami League
2018	Shaimum Sarwar Kamal	Awami League
2024	Shaimum Sarwar Kamal	Awami League
2026	Lutfur Rahman Kajal	Bangladesh Nationalist Party

== Elections ==
=== Elections in the 2010s ===
Shaimum Sarwar Kamal was elected unopposed in the 2014 general election after opposition parties withdrew their candidacies in a boycott of the election.

=== Elections in the 2000s ===
General Election 2008: Cox's Bazar-3
Party	Candidate	Votes	%	±%
BNP	Lutfur Rahman Kajal	126,478	45.6	−46.3
AL	Shaimum Sarwar Kamal	86,536	31.2	+24.5
Independent	Mohammad Sahiduzzaman	63,068	22.8	N/A
Gano Forum	Saiful Islam Chowdhury	578	0.2	N/A
FP	Syed Ullaya Azad	247	0.1	N/A
Bangladesh Kalyan Party	RAM Ismail Faruk	185	0.1	N/A
Majority		39,942	14.4	−70.8
Turnout		277,092	94.4	+51.8
BNP hold				

The BNP candidate died days before the 1 October 2001 general election. Voting in the constituency was postponed until 1 November. Mohammad Sahiduzzaman, the deceased's younger brother, ran in his place.

General Election 2001: Cox's Bazar-3
Party	Candidate	Votes	%	±%
BNP	Mohammad Sahiduzzaman	113,895	91.9	+48.6
AL	Mostaq Ahmad Chowdhury	8,312	6.7	−19.3
Independent	Lutfur Rahman Kajal	746	0.6	N/A
BKSMA (Sadeq)	Krishak Md. Sadeq	539	0.4	N/A
Bangladesh Manobatabadi Dal (Bamad)	Md. Omar Faruk	237	0.2	N/A
Independent	Ameer Mohammad Bachchu	190	0.2	N/A
Majority		105,583	85.2	+67.8
Turnout		123,919	42.6	−32.2
BNP hold				

=== Elections in the 1990s ===
General Election June 1996: Cox's Bazar-3
Party	Candidate	Votes	%	±%
BNP	Mohammad Khalequzzaman	69,119	43.3	+14.0
AL	Mostaq Ahmad Chowdhury	41,405	26.0	−4.2
Jamaat	Salamat Ullah	30,901	19.4	−8.9
JP(E)	Nurul Abdar	13,124	8.2	+7.5
IOJ	Mohammad Muslem	4,509	2.8	N/A
Independent	Didarul Alam Chowdhury	393	0.2	N/A
Majority		27,714	17.4	+16.5
Turnout		159,451	74.8	+21.8
BNP gain from AL				

General Election 1991: Cox's Bazar-3
Party	Candidate	Votes	%	±%
AL	Mostaq Ahmad Chowdhury	32,106	30.2	
BNP	Mohammad Khalequzzaman	31,109	29.3	
Jamaat	Salamat Ullah	30,141	28.3	
NDP	Shahjahan Chowdhury	9,913	9.3	
Bangladesh Krishak Sramik Awami League (1983–1991)	Nurul Islam	1,686	1.6	
JP(E)	Khorshed Ara Haque	776	0.7	
Independent	Hafez Ahmad	222	0.2	
Independent	Nurul Haque	210	0.2	
Independent	Munirul Alam Chowdhury	159	0.1	
Majority		997	0.9	
Turnout		106,322	53.0	
AL gain from JP(E)				
