= Florence Eid-Oakden =

Lebanese economist (died 2022)

- Died: 29 January 2022; London, England
- Occupation: Economist
- Children: 2
- Website: http://www.arabiamonitor.com

Florence Eid-Oakden (died 29 January 2022) was the CEO & Chief Economist of Arabia Monitor Research & Strategy

== Career ==
Eid-Oakden was formerly head of MENA research at JP Morgan, and has subsequently worked with the World Bank on Latin America and North Africa, and also, on the buy side as a hedge fund investment professional. She was a professor of economics and finance at the American University of Beirut and a visiting professor at INSEAD and HEC Paris.

She sat on the Board of Directors of Natixis Saudi Arabia where she serves as chair of the Audit & Risk and Compensation Committees. Previously, she has acted as a member of HSBC's Middle East Financial System Risk Advisory Committee and, for a period of 9 years (three terms), as a Director of the Arab Banking Corporation International Bank in London, and of Bank ABC Jordan (2 terms). Eid-Oakden has been a Director of Shuaa Capital in Dubai.

Eid-Oakden was a member of the Board of Trustees of the Arab Bankers Association of North America in New York, and is a member of the Advisory Council of the Al Faisal University College of Business, Saudi Arabia, where she also advises the Saudi Government. A few years back, she enjoyed serving as a Trustee of the American University in Paris, where she completed her undergraduate studies. She received her Ph.D. in Organization Economics from the Massachusetts Institute of Technology (MIT) with a joint MIT-Harvard Doctoral Committee, under the supervision of Bengt Holmström, a Nobel Laureate Professor. She was reportedly fluent in English, French, Spanish and Arabic, and has a working knowledge of Italian and Portuguese.

She was a regular contributor to Bloomberg News and has appeared on CNN, France24, and The Wall Street Journal.
