= Eidgaon Upazila =

Eidgaon ঈদগাঁও
- Upazila
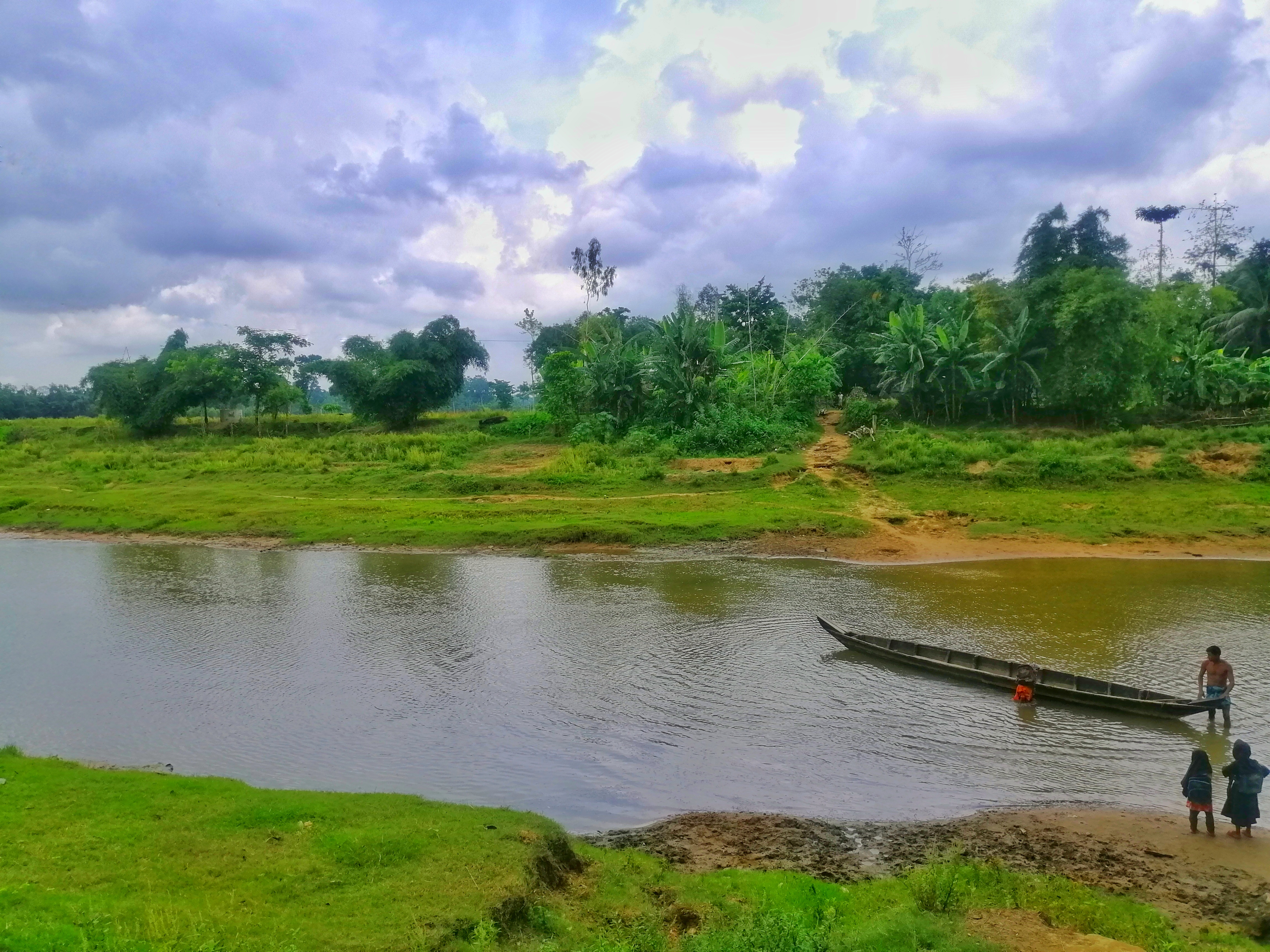
- A riverside area in the village of Gojalia, Eidgaon, Cox's Bazar

- Country: Bangladesh
- Division: Chittagong
- District: Cox's Bazar
- Thana: 21 October 2019
- Upazila: 26 July 2021

Government
  - MP (Cox's Bazar-3): Vacant

Area
  - Total: 119.66 km^{2} (46.20 sq mi)

Population (2022)
  - Total: 149,566
  - Density: 1,249.9/km^{2} (3,237.3/sq mi)
- Demonym: Eidgaiya
- Time zone: UTC+6 (BST)
- Postal code: 4702
- Area code: 0341

Eidgaon (Bengali: ঈদগাঁও) is an upazila of Cox's Bazar District in the Division of Chittagong, Bangladesh. Combined with the adjoining unions of Chowfaldandi and Varuakhali, it forms the traditional region of Greater Eidgaon.

== Geography ==
Eidgaon Upazila is bounded by Ramu Upazila to the east, Cox's Bazar Sadar Upazila to its south, Maheshkhali Upazila to its west, and Chakaria Upazila to its north. It has a total area of 119.66 square kilometres (46.20 sq mi).

== History ==
The present-day Eidgaon area of the upazila was formerly known as Nayabad. Greater Nayabad/Eidgaon encompassed the current Eidgaon Upazilas as well as the unions of Chowfaldandi and Varuakhali. The Mughal prince Shah Shuja set off with his forces to Arakan after being defeated in the war of imperial succession. They passed through Nayabad on the day of Eid al-Fitr, where they performed Eid prayers. From this event, the Nayabad area came to be known as Eidgaon (the village of Eid). Some elders have located the place of this incident to be an eidgah in the village of Yusufer Khil in Islamabad Union.

In the 1900s, Khan Saheb Muzaffar Ahmad Chowdhury was the principal zamindar of Eidgaon. His capital was at Chowfaldandi (presently in Cox's Bazar Sadar Upazila), where his palace can still be seen in Khamarpara and the stairs of his kachari in the hills. Chowdhury disappeared after setting off for Hajj in 1937. He was succeeded by his grandson Mostaq Ahmad Chowdhury and Kaniz Fatimah Ahmad. Other zamindars of the area included Muhammad Shiqdar, the Amir of Masuakhali, who is credited for the development of the Eidgaon Bazar Central Mosque in 1946. It was first established by his father, Magan Ali Shiqdar, in 1905 at his own wooden cottage house near a pond. Tayyabullah Faraizi of Farazipara became the dominant zamindar of greater Eidgaon in the 1960s during the rule of Ayub Khan. In the 1970s, administration fell in the hands of Nurul Islam Chowdhury (Bedar Miah) of Shiqdarpara, better known as Bedar Mian. Other members were Jalal Ahmad Faraizi, Muzaffar Ahmad Member, Abu Khalifah, Moulvi Sayyid Nur, Moulvi Siddiq Khalwi, who distrusted Bedar Mian.

After, Greater Eidgaon was divided into three unions; Eidgaon, Chowfaldandi and Pokkhali. Chowfaldandi was later divided into Chowfaldandi and Varuakhali, and Pokkhali was divided into Pokkhali and Islampur. By 1990, the Eidgaon Union was also divided into three unions; Islamabad, Jalalabad and (reduced) Eidgaon. A memorandum was sent to the Cox's Bazar District Commissioner for the declaration of Eidgaon as a separate upazila on 22 July 2019. The National Implementation Committee for Administrative Reorganization-Reform (NICAR) established Eidgaon as a thana on 21 October 2019. On 26 July 2021, Khandker Anwarul Islam upgraded the status of Eidgaon to an upazila, consisting of the northern five unions of the Cox's Bazar Sadar Upazila.

== Administration ==
The upazila is made up of five union parishads:

1. Islampur Union
2. Pokkhali Union
3. Islamabad Union
4. Eidgaon Union
5. Jalalabad Union

== Demographics ==
Religions in Eidgaon Upazila (2022)
Religion	Percent
Islam	95.74%
Hinduism	4.21%
Other or not stated	0.05%

According to the 2022 Bangladeshi census, Eidgaon Upazila had 31,721 households and a population of 149,566. 12.56% of the population were under 5 years of age. Eidgaon had a literacy rate (age 7 and over) of 76.09%: 76.71% for males and 75.48% for females, and a sex ratio of 99.22 males for every 100 females. 66,675 (44.58%) lived in urban areas.

As of the 2022 Bangladeshi census, Eidgaon upazila had a population of 1,49,566. 34,086 (28.33%) were under 10 years of age. Eidgaon had an average literacy rate of 45.98%, compared to the national average of 51.8%, and a sex ratio of 982 females per 1000 males. 56,045 (46.58%) of the population lived in urban areas.

The people of the Greater Eidgaon region (Eidgaon Upazila, Chowfaldandi and Varuakhali) maintain a distinct identity in addition to their regional, ethnic and religious identities, due to their geographical and historical heritage. Before 2021, greater Eidgaon was divided into many unions but the people continued to refer to themselves to be "from Eidgaon" even to the people of Cox's Bazar, even if they weren't from the reduced "Eidgaon Union".

== Education ==
Khan Saheb Muzaffar Ahmad Chowdhury, the zamindar of Eidgaon in the 1900s, established the ME School in Eidgaon. This school has now evolved into the Eidgaon Model High School and Eidgaon Government Primary School. Chowdhury also established the Eidgaon Almasia Madrasa, named after his wife, Almas Khatun. The madrasa is now at Kamil degree status.

== Notable people ==
- Mohammad Nurul Huda, Poet & Director General of Bangla Academy
- Mostaq Ahmad Chowdhury, Former Member of Parliament
- Helal Uddin Ahmed, Former Senior Secretary
- Lutfur Rahman Kajal, member of parliament
