= Mansour Eid =

Lebanese writer, novelist, researcher and poet

- Born: 12 February 1944; Bteddine El Loqch, Lebanon
- Died: 16 July 2013 (aged 69)
- Occupations: Professor, Writer, Researcher
- Writing career
- Genres: Novels, short stories, research
- Notable works: Strangers, The Phoenix Bird

Mansour Eid (Arabic: منصور عيد) (1944–2013) was a Lebanese writer, novelist, researcher and poet. Born in Bteddine El Loqch, a village of the Jezzine district in southern Lebanon on 12 February 1944. He completed his secondary studies in Our Lady of Mashmoushe School. He received a degree in Philosophical & Social Studies from Arab Beirut University and a degree in Arabic Literature from the Lebanese University and a PHD degree in Arabic Literature from Saint Joseph University.

He started off his career teaching Arabic language and literature as well as Philosophy in a number of Lebanese schools, until he became a full-time faculty member at Notre Dame University - Louaize, earning the title of Professor and getting appointed the Chairperson of the Social and Behavioral Sciences Department. He remained in this post until his death in 2013.

His early works mainly consisted of short stories, but then diversified into essays, research and novels (starting with The Phoenix Bird in 1998). Two of his major research works concerned the Lebanese writers, Boulos Salameh, and Emily Nasrallah. He also wrote a collection of poems, (The Vineyards' Melodies) which has won the Said Fayad Literary Prize in year 2007.

Dr. Mansour Eid received numerous awards for his novels and research as well as being elected a founding member of the International Committee for teaching Arabic to non-speakers in Yarmouk University Jordan.

After his death, in November 2013, the internal square of the faculty of Humanities at Notre Dame University was named after him (Notre Dame University Commemorates Dr. Mansour Eid), and in July 2014 was inaugurated in Lady of Mashmoushe Monastery a museum dedicated to the authors and poets of the region of Jezzine, holding Dr. Mansour Eid's name.

== Education ==
- (1985) Doctorate in Arabic Language and Literature, Saint Joseph University
- (1979) M.A. in Arabic Language and Literature, Lebanese University
- (1975) B.A. in Arabic Language and Literature, Lebanese University
- (1969) B.A. in Philosophy and Social Studies, Arab University of Beirut

== Publications ==
=== Novels ===
- (2008) ‘’Kherbit Massoud’’ (Massoud’s Cottage)
- (2007) ‘’Shararat Al Ramad’’ (Sparkling Ember)
- (2005) ‘’Ghadan Yozher El Sakej’’ (The Snow Will Blossom Tomorrow)
- (1998) ‘’Ta’er Al Fineeq’’ (The Phoenix Bird) (with a French translation – 2007)

=== Short stories ===
- (1992) ‘’Rawdat Al Hourouf Wa Hadiqat Al Kalimat‘’ (The Vale of Letters Garden of Words)
- (1991) ‘’Wa Baadik Ya Beirut’’ (Beirut Here You Are)
- (1991) ‘’Wafa’‘’(Fidelity)
- (1990) ‘’Souwar Min Al Hayat’’ (Pictures from Life)
- (1989) ‘’Beirut Hal Tazkoureen’’ (Beirut Do You Remember)
- (1988) ‘’Douroub Wa Atyaf‘’(Roads and Shadows)
- (1986) ‘’Majaneen Aliha’’ (Mad Gods)
- (1985) ‘’Awraq Fi Al Zakira’’ (Papers in the Memory)
- (1983) ‘’Ghourabaa‘’(Strangers)

=== Studies and essays ===
- (2013) ‘’Rihlat Al Noussous’’(The Journey of Texts)
- (2011) ‘’Alshark w Al-Gharb’’ (East and West)
- (2006) ’’Rouwwad Lubnaniyyoun’’(Lebanese Leaders)
- (2002) ’’Twenty Fifth Anniversary of Boulos Salame’s Death’’
- (1996) ’’Al Mashyakha Fil Al Kanaes Al Mousliha’’(studies for the Union of Churches / Middle East Church Syndicate)
- (1995) ‘’Kalimat Min Al Hadara’’ (Words from Civilization)
- (1995) ‘’Qadaya Insaniyya Fi Riwayat Emily Nasrallah’’(Humanitarian Issues in the Novels of Emily Nasrallah'’)
- (1992) '’Boulos Salameh Sha'ir Al Malahem Wal Alam'’(Boulos Salame: Poet of Epics and Pain)
- (1990) '’Al Moukhtassar Al Moufeed Fi Dirasat Al Noussous'’(The Essential Guide for Studying Literature)

=== Children's literature ===
- (2001) The Rabbit and the Voyage into Dreamland (Children short stories volumes, issued in Arabic and English)
- (1995) ‘’Al Khayyat Wa Abnaou’oh Al Thalatha‘’(The Tailor and His Three Sons)
- (1993) ‘’Al Ameera Mira’’ (Princess Mira)
- (1993) ‘’Al Ameer Wal Roumanat Al Thalath‘’ (The Prince and the Three Pomegranates).
- (1992) ‘’Shajrat Al Saada’’ (The Tree of Bliss)
- (1992) ‘’Thoulathiyyat Kasser Al Thi’b Al Mouhtal‘’ (Trilogy of Kasser the Cunning Wolf)
- (1992) ‘’Shajrat Al Saada‘’ (The Tree of Bliss)
- (1990) ‘’Al Sayyad Al Moughamer’’ (The Adventurous Hunter)

=== Poetry ===
- (2007) ‘’Alhan al Kouroum’’ (The Vineyards’ Melodies). Winner of the Said Fayad Literary Prize.

=== Theater ===
- Daydoun
- Hekem Karakouch (Karakouch the Ruler)

=== Conference proceedings ===
- (2005) Centers and Resolutions for the Dialogue of Civilizations. Proceedings the Conference of Literature in Arab Universities. Egypt: Al Minya University.
- (2005) The Pastoral Poet and the War of Civilizations. Proceedings Criticism Conference. Jordan: Jarash University.
- (2004) Globalization and Education: Horizons of Excellence and Genius of the Seminar on Globalization and the Priorities of Education ’04. Riyadh, King Saoud University, Faculty of Education.
- (2003) The Place of the Arab Lebanese Literary Text in the Movement Interaction and Acculturation. Proceedings of the Fifth Conference on the Arabic Cultural Interaction and Acculturation, Jarash University, Jordan. Notre Dame University Press, Vol.9 (1), pp.5-15.
- (2002) Ameen Rihani’s “Khaled” between the Civilization of East and Proceedings of the Literature and Dialogue of Civilizations Conference '02. Of Damascus.
- (2002) The Arabs Between Globalization and Human Rights. Scientific Conference (The Arab and the West) '02. Jarash, Jordan: Philadelphia
- (2001) The Culture of the Arab Child and Audiovisual Challenges. Proceedings of the Twentieth Conference of the Union of Arab Authors.
- (2001) The Feminist Movement in the Lebanese Novel. Proceedings Nineteenth Conference of the Union of Arab Authors in Tripoli West, Libya, Palma Journal, Beirut: Notre Dame University Press. Vol.7 (2), pp. 5–16.
- (1998) Computers and Teaching the Arabic Language for Non-Native Proceedings of the First International Conference for the Teaching of the Arabic for Non-Native Speakers. Irbid, Jordan: Yarmouk University.
