= Souzan El-Eid =

Breast surgical oncologist

Souzan El-Eid is a breast surgical oncologist at Comprehensive Cancer Centers of Nevada (CCCN), and serves as the medical director of the Breast Care Center at Summerlin Hospital, cancer liaison physician for the cancer program and co-chair of the Breast Tumor Board at Summerlin Hospital. She is also the president elect for Clark County Medical Society. She is an Adjunct Associate Professor of General Surgery at Touro University Nevada and has served as principal investigator for several clinical research studies. She is the first breast surgeon in Las Vegas certified in both ultrasound and stereotactic breast biopsies.

== Career ==
El-Eid joined Comprehensive Cancer Centers of Nevada in 2010 as a breast surgical oncologist. In addition to this role, she serves as the medical director of the Breast Care Center at Summerlin Hospital, cancer liaison physician for the cancer program and co-chair of the Breast Tumor Board at Summerlin Hospital. She also frequently gives presentations and lecturers about breast cancer to the public and physicians.

El-Eid is an instructor at the American Society of Breast Surgeons’ Annual Meeting, teaching breast ultrasound and stereotactic breast biopsy. She was also invited by the American Society of Clinical Oncology (ACSO) to review and publish clinical practice guidelines on surgical margins for breast-conserving surgery with whole-breast irradiation in stage I and II invasive breast cancer. The data was published by the Journal of Clinical Oncology in spring 2014.

El-Eid ran a private breast surgery practice, Breast Health Medical Services, PLLC, from 2009 to 2010 in Las Vegas after first creating the practice in Kingston, New York in 2006. In 2009, she initiated and chaired tumor board conferences at St. Rose Dominican Hospital – San Martín Campus. She served as a cancer liaison physician for Benedictine Hospital in Kingston from 2002 to 2009, and worked as medical director of Fern Feldman Anolick Breast Center at Benedictine Hospital from 2001 to 2009. She served as a breast surgeon in Kingston from 1996 through 2009, serving with organizations such as Colorectal PC, Hudson Valley Surgical Associates and operating her own private practice.

El-Eid earned her medical degree from the University of Nebraska College of Medicine in 1990, and completed her internship at Saint Raphael Hospital in New Haven, Connecticut and her general surgery residency at Nassau County Medical Center in East Meadow, New York. She completed a surgical critical care fellowship at Wayne State University in Detroit, Michigan, and became the administrative chief resident at Nassau County Medical Center in East Meadow.

== Professional memberships ==
El-Eid serves as president elect for Clark County Medical Society and as treasurer for the Nevada Oncology Society Board. She is also vice president of the Las Vegas chapter of the National Arab American Medical Association.

El-Eid is a current or past member of several medical societies, including:

- Clark County Medical Society Membership Committee
- Clark County Medical Society Board of Trustees
- Community Clinical Oncology Program, Southwest Oncology Group
- Nevada Oncology Society Board
- Clark County Medical Society
- Nevada State Medical Society
- Nevada State Medical Association Reference Committee
- Society of Surgical Oncology, Inc.
- American Society of Clinical Oncology
- American College of Surgeons Oncology Group
- American College of Surgeons
- International College of Surgeons
- American Society of Breast Surgeons
- National Consortium of Breast Centers, Inc.
- American Medical Association
- International Sentinel Node Society

== In the media ==
- Personal Decisions and Sorting Through New Guidelines for Breast Cancer Screening Las Vegas Weekly, November 4, 2015.
- Breast Cancer Self Exams ABC-KTNV, May 18, 2015.
- Oncologist stresses follow-up care for breast cancer survivors Las Vegas Review-Journal, November 2, 2015.
- New breast cancer screening guidelines surprise young, local survivor NBC-KSNV, October 20, 2015.
- People on the Move VEGAS INC, December 14, 2014.
- Las Vegas mom, diagnosed with cancer while pregnant, is a survivor Las Vegas Review-Journal, November 27, 2014.
- Medical Society’s Mini Internship gives perspective on doctors’ jobs Las Vegas Review-Journal, November 17, 2014.
- Medical Marvels: Nevada’s Top Physicians Nevada Business Magazine, November 1, 2014.
- Cancer survivor had her eggs frozen before chemo to get pregnant Las Vegas Review-Journal, May 10, 2014.
- Focus on the Future Annual Educational Conference and Tradeshow HomeCare Magazine, April 21, 2014.
- Preventative Measures for Breast Cancer ABC-KTNV, May 17, 2013.
- Genetic Testing for Breast Cancer FOX-KVVU, May 17, 2013.
- Jolie’s breast cancer warning expected to help others Las Vegas Review-Journal, May 15, 2013.
- Doctors of the Desert: Dr. Souzan El-Eid Las Vegas Woman, August 24, 2012.

== Awards and honors ==
El-Eid has been recognized for her work by many of the nation's leading medical groups, research organizations and media outlets. These notable honors include:

- Named one of Top Doctors by Las Vegas Life Magazine - Spring 2012
- Named one of Medical Marvels by Nevada Business Magazine - May 2012
- Named one of Southern Nevada's Top Doctors by Desert Companion Magazine, as chosen by Castle Connolly Medical Ltd.- August, 2011
- Recipient of the 2006 Cancer Liaison Physician Outstanding Performance Award, received from the American College of Surgeons - August, 2007
- Appointed as State Regent for New York, ICS - July 2006
- Elected the American Cancer Ambassador to represent New York at the Celebration on the Hill, Washington, D.C. - September, 2006
- Honoree of the YWCA of Ulster County's Tribute to Women - 2003
- Recipient of the Reach to Recovery Award of Excellence in Breast Cancer Treatment and Rehabilitation from American Cancer Society, Eastern Division - 2002
- Recipient of the Healthy Women's Partnership Award – October, 2001
- Named Administrative Chief Resident at Nassau County Medical Center - 1995 - 1996
- Named Resident of the Year, Nassau County Medical Center - 1993 - 1994
- Recipient of Nebraska Medical Education Fund Scholarship - 1988–1989
- Recipient of The Regents Scholarship - 1984–1986
- Named member of Golden Key Honor Society - 1985–1986
- Included on Arts & Sciences College Dean's List - 1983–1985

Publications

- Thomas A. Buchholz, Mark R. Somerfield, Jennifer J. Griggs, Souzan El-Eid, M. Elizabeth H. Hammond, Gary H. Lyman, Ginny Mason, and Lisa A. Newman. “Margins for Breast-Conserving Surgery With Whole-Breast Irradiation in Stage I and II Invasive Breast Cancer: American Society of Clinical Oncology Endorsement of the Society of Surgical Oncology/American Society for Radiation Oncology Consensus Guideline.” Journal of Clinical Oncology, Volume 32: 1502-1506, April 2014.
- Health Q&A letter published to the editor of the Las Vegas Review-Journal, “Teen breast cancer” September 16, 2012.
- Anees b. Chagpar, M.D., M.Sc., David J. Carlson, M.D., Alison L. Laidley, M.D., Souzan E. El-Eid, M.D., Terre Q. McGlothin, M.D., Robert D. Noyes, M.D., Phillip B. Ley, M.D., Todd M. Tuttle, M.D., Kelly M. McMasters, M.D., PhD., for the University of Louisville Breast Cancer Sentinel Lymph Node Study, “Factors Influencing the Number of Sentinel Lymph Nodes Identified in Patients with Breast Cancer”, The American Journal of Surgery, page 860, Volume 194, December 2007.
- Anees B. Chagpar, MD.MSc; Charles R. Scoggins, MD; Robert C.G. Martin II, MD; David J. Carlson, MD; Alison L. Laidley, MD; Souzan E. El-Eid, MD; Terre Q. McGlothin, MD; Kelly M. McMasters, MD, PhD; for the University of Louisville Breast Sentinel Lymph Node Study Investigators, “Are 3 Sentinel Nodes Sufficient?”, ‘Arch Surg”, page 456-460, Volume 142, May 2007.
- Anees B. Chagpar, Charles R. Scoggins, Robert C.G. Martin II, David J. Carlson, Alison L. Laidley, Souzan E. El-Eid, Terre Q. McGlothin, and Kelly M. McMasters, for the University of Louisville Breast Sentinel Lymph Node Study, “Prediction of Sentinel Lymph Node-Only Disease in Women With Invasive Breast Cancer”, The American Journal of Surgery, page 882, Volume 192, #6, December 2006.
- Anees B. Chagpar, MD, MSc, Charles R. Scoggins, MD, Robert C. G. Martin 2nd, MD, Earl F. Cook, ScD. Terry McCurry, MD, Nana Mizuguchi, MD, Kristie J. Paris, MD, David J. Carlson, MD, Alison L. Laidley, MD, Souzan E. El-Eid, MD, Terre Q. McGlothin, MD, and Kelly M. McMasters, MD, PhD for the University of Louisville Breast Sentinel Lymph Node Study, “Predicting Patients at Low Probability of Requiring Postmastectomy Radiation Therapy, page 670, Annals of Surgical Oncology 14(2):670-677, November 10, 2006.
- Aneew B. Chagpar, Charles R. Scoggins, Sunati Sahoo, Robert C. Martin, ll, David J. Carlson, Alison L. Laidley, Souzan E. El-Eid, Terre Q. McGlothin, Robert D. Noyes, Phillip B. Ley, Todd M. Tuttle, and Kelly M. McMasters, For the University of Louisville Breast Sentinel Lymph Node Study. “Biopsy Type Does not Influence Sentinel Lymph Node Status” Am. J. Surg. pages 551-556, Volume 190, #4, October, 2005.
- Anees B. Chagpar, Farid Kehdy, Charles R. Scoggins, Robert C.G. Martin, ll, David J. Carlson, Alison L. Laidley, Souzan E. El-Eid, Terre Q. McGlothin, Robert D. Noyes, Phillip B. Ley, Todd M. Tuttle, and Kelly M. McMasters, for the University of Louisville Breast Sentinel Lymph Node Study. “Effect of Lymphoscintigraphy Drainage Patterns on Sentinel Lymph Node Biopsy in Patients with Breast Cancer”, Am. J. Surg., pages 557-562 Volume 190, #4, October, 2005.
- Anees B. Chagpar, MD, MSc, Charles R. Scoggins, MD, Robert C. G. Martin 2nd, MD, Earl F. Cook, ScD, Terry McCurry, MD, Nana Mizuguchi, MD, Kristie J. Paris, MD, David J. Carlson, MD, Alison L. Laidley, MD, Souzan E. El-Eid, MD, Terre Q. McGlothin, MD, and Kelly M. McMasters, MD, PhD for the University of Louisville Breast Sentinel Lymph Node Study. “Predicting Four or More Positive Lymph Nodes in Women with Breast Cancer” presented at the Western Surgical Society Meeting held in Palm Springs, California, November 6–9, 2005.
- MD, Terre Q. McGlothin, MD, Robert D. Noyes, MD, Phillip B. Ley, MD, Todd M. Tuttle, and Kelly M. McMasters, MD, PhD, for the University of Louisville Breast Cancer Sentinel Lymph Node Study. “Factors Predicting Failure to Identify a Sentinel Lymph Node In Breast Cancer”, Louisville, KY, Surgery 2005; 138:56-63.
- Book Review, “Field Guide to the Difficult Patient Interview, 2nd ed.” By Frederic W. Platt and Geoffrey H. Gordon, Reviewed by Souzan E. El-Eid, M.D., Summer/Fall 2005 Professional Supplement to the Healthcare Communication Review, Hudson Valley Region, New York, Fall 2005.
- Anees B. Chagpar, MD, MSc, Jamie L. Studts, PhD, Charles R. Scoggins, MD, Robert C. G. Martin 2nd, MD, David J. Carlson, MD, Alison L. Laidley, MD, Souzan E. El-Eid, MD, Terre Q. McGlothin, MD, Robert D. Noyes, MD, and Kelly M. McMasters, MD, PhD for the University of Louisville Breast Sentinel Lymph Node Study. “Factors Associated with Surgical Options For Breast Carcinoma” presented at the American Society of Breast Diseases Meeting held in Las Vegas, NV, April 14–16, 2005, Cancer 2006;106:1462-6.
- Dagher, F; Barrett, L; Evans, J. Sammett, D; El-Eid, S; Guru, K; Ger, R: “Combined Subclavian Artery and Brachial Plexus Injury in Blunt Chest Trauma”, Contemporary Surgery, Vol 52, No. 2, 1998; pp 105 – 109
- Lessin, MS; El-Eid, SE; Klein, MD; Cullen, ML: “Extracorporeal Membrane Oxygenation in Pediatric Respiratory Failure Secondary to Smoke Inhalation Injury’, J. Pediatric Surgery, Vol. 31, No 9 (Sept), 1996; pp 1285–1287
