= Odette Eid =

Brazilian sculptor (1922–2019)

- Born: Odette Haidar Eid; March 7, 1922; Zahlé
- Died: July 13, 2019 (aged 97); São Paulo
- Occupation: sculptor

Odette Haidar Eid (March 7, 1922 in Zahlé, Lebanon – July 13, 2019 in São Paulo, Brazil) was a Brazilian sculptor.

== Biography ==
When she was three years old, Eid emigrated with her family to São Paulo in Brazil. Eid's mother, a self-taught painter, specialized in copies of great masters.

Decades later, already married and with four children, Eid started taking courses such as: Art History at IADÊ-Art and Design Institute, with Paulo Ramos Machado; Brazilian Art at Espade, with Loy Cox Vilela; Brazilian Folklore Theory and Research at Escola de Folclore, with Rossini Tavares de Lima and Julieta de Andrade; Myths and Magic, Art History, with Fábio Magalhães; Contemporary Art, with Alice Brill and Avancini.

At the age of 52, Eid was diagnosed with breast cancer and had to undergo a mastectomy that left her right arm with a chronic deficiency. As a result, between 1974 and 1982, Eid traveled to many different places including Lebanon, Middle East, Europe, United States, Japan and China. Eid visited many museums and international collections, which contributed to widen the repertoire for her future creations.

Odette's talent bloomed in 1982 when she created dolls with heads made of epoxy and fabric, using her “savoir faire” in sewing, which she had also learned from her mother. In 1983, these first works resulted in her first exhibition as an artist at Chelsea Art Gallery – São Paulo.

Two years after starting her work as an artist, Odette Eid refined her techniques and knowledge with the Italian sculptors Domenico Calabrone and Elvio Becheroni, at Studio Artescultura2, and took drawing classes with Odetto Guersoni. After that, Eid started her renowned work in bronze sculptures which started to be displayed in solo and group exhibitions.

In 1995, a decade later, dozens of her works were shown at a solo exhibition at the Museum of Sculpture and Ecology in São Paulo. At the same time, the book Odette, Escultura – a retrospective of her works was also published. The book featured graphic design by Emilie Chamie, photos by Romulo Fialdini and texts by Paulo Klein, Radha Abramo and Emanoel Araújo.

In 2000, Eid started to teach sculpture at Studio Amarilis, located on the avenue of the same name, in the district Cidade Jardim, São Paulo. This period marks the beginning of her digital art. In 2007, Odette dared to use flowers, silk, sequin and hats in her exhibition Cabeças e Reminiscências (Heads and Reminiscences), at Espaço Cultural V Centenário, in São Paulo-SP, during the Folklore Month.

Her irreverent creations resulted in her book Minhas Cabeças (My Heads), published in 2008. It also gained her other exhibitions in Brazil, including one at the Art Museum of Bahia and another at Galeria Estação, in São Paulo-SP, Brazil.

The artist won clients around the world and her works gained space in private and official collections in Germany, Australia, Austria, Brazil, China, Egypt, Spain, United States, France, Greece (Sultan Lines), Israel, Italy (Enzo Ferrari), Lebanon, Norway, Syria and Sweden (Queen Silvia).

In the year 2017, Eid received an honor from CONSCRE – Parliamentary State Council of Communities of Foreign Roots and Cultures, awarded by the Legislative Assembly of São Paulo – a recognition from the Lebanese community.

Despite the chronic difficulty in her right arm because of the mastectomy, Eid never stopped creating. However, in the last years of her life, with declining health she dedicated herself to digital art and collage works, which remain unpublished.

On March 26, 2022, Santo Antônio do Pinhal-SP opened an Open Air Museum of Eid's work, as part of the artist's centenary celebrations, which became a permanent public exhibition.

== Works ==
Odette Eid produced more than 1200 works comprising sculptures, multiples and utilitarians, using materials such as bronze, aluminum, acrylic, paper, plaster and fabric.

Her famous bronze sculptures comprise many themes: love, family, maternity, dance, sport, saints and animals.

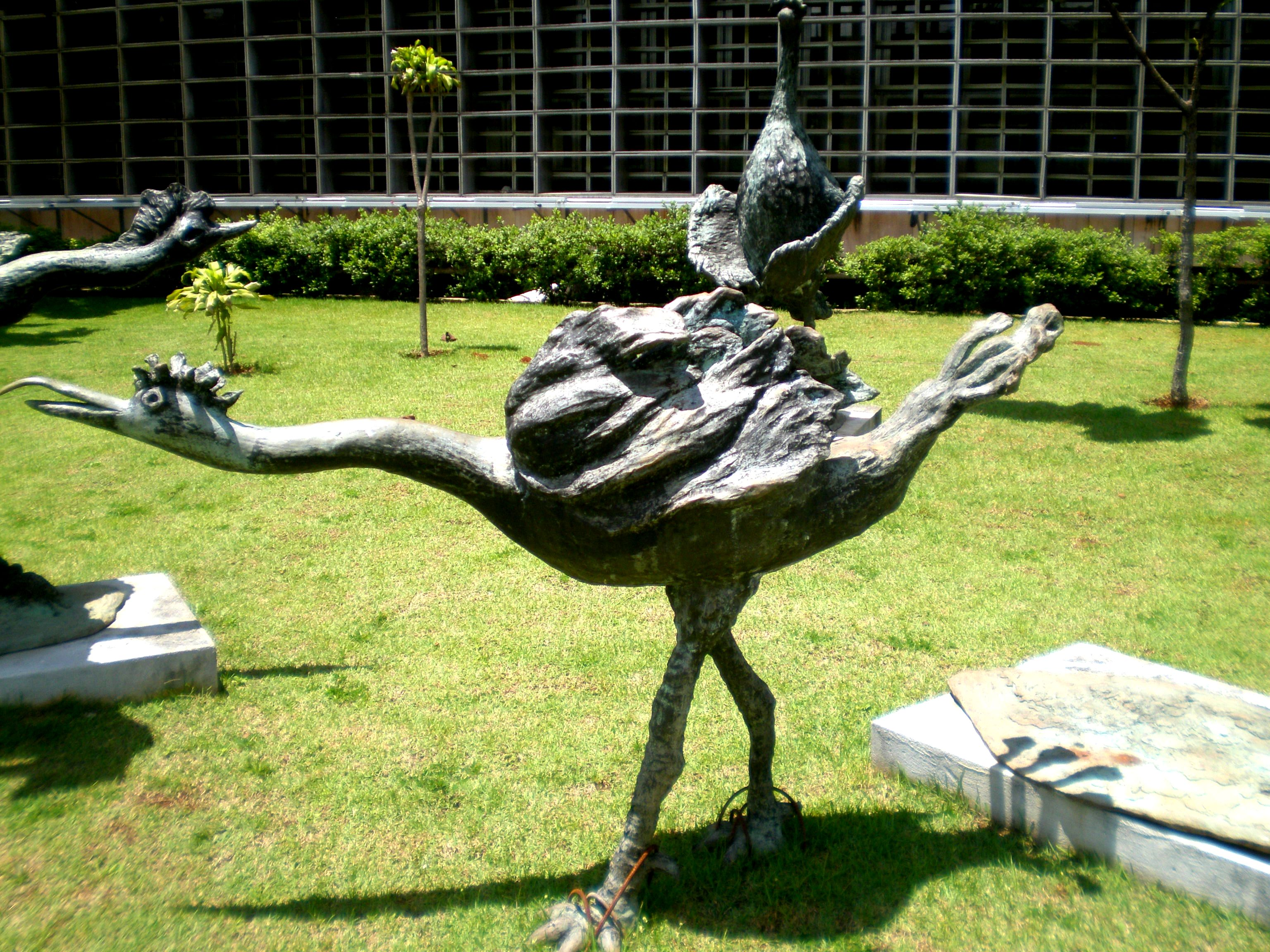
Odette Eid 'Imaginary Birds' (Pássaros Imaginários) 1994, Museum of Art Sculpture Garden, Parliament of São Paulo, Brazil

The themes of her aluminum works are of stylized or imaginary flowers and birds, as the ones exhibited in 2005 for the first time in the exhibition Aluminagem, at SESC Ipiranga, in São Paulo–SP. They are currently on display at Parque da Luz Open Air Museum, part of Pinacoteca do Estado de São Paulo. An animated video "YouTube: Botão de Rosa (Pink Rose) – Odette Haidar Eid" produced with an avatar that communicates through Brazilian sign language, available online, tells a little about the artist's life and work.

The small dolls created during her first phase (1982) are playful, colorful, surrealistic characters full of humor. They have mouths with heads instead of teeth and ball-shaped bodies with multiple heads and legs.

On the other hand, the dolls created during her second and last phase of work, preserve the humor of the first phase with a touch of insolence and debauchery very close to Brazilian folklore. These works were exhibited for the first time in August 2007, in Cabeças e Reminiscências (Heads and Reminiscences), exhibition held at Espaço Cultural V Centenário, Legislative Assembly of the State of São Paulo, celebrating Folklore Month.

In the following year, the collection travelled to the Art Museum of Bahia Museu de Arte da Bahia and to Galeria Estação, this time under the title Minhas Cabeças (My Heads).

In December 2002 at São Bento Metro station, the artist built a nativity scene with dolls measuring 2.40 meters high representing the main characters in the story of the birth of Jesus. It was built out of recycled fabric, old newspapers, construction materials, and the dolls were assembled and decorated with custom jewelry.

During her life, Odette Eid had two studios, one in São Paulo, Studio Amarilis, where she gave classes and where there are still some of her works, and another in Santo Antônio do Pinhal – Studio Riacho Doce, an outdoor private museum, that holds most of her collection.

=== In public spaces ===
Various works by Odette Eid can be seen in many spaces in the city of São Paulo, such as museums and public places.

In 1987 her sculpture Mãe com Filho (Mother with Son), was placed in the entrance hall of Hospital Sírio-Libanês.

Some squares in the city also had the honor of receiving the talented artist's creations, such as the granite and bronze sculpture commissioned by the Lebanese community in Brazil to commemorate the 500th anniversary of the discovery of Brazil, located at Praça Professor Jairo de Almeida Ramos, in the district of Vila Nova Conceição. Since 2008, in this location, you can see the bust of Khalil Gibran, another Lebanese artist, produced by Odette Eid in bronze and granite. In 2000, it was the turn of Praça dos Omaguás, in the district of Pinheiros, to receive the sculpture Passaredo made in bronze and granite. That same year, Clube Espéria commissioned the artist to create a work to commemorate its centenary and offer it to the city of São Paulo. Vitória (Victory) is the title of a sculpture in bronze, granite and steel, located at Praça Airton de Abreu.

Since 2013, her works Mulher que carrega o mundo (Women Who Carries the World) and Pássaros imaginários I, II e III (Imaginary Birds I, II and III) are part of Legislative Assembly of the State of São Paulo Outdoor Sculpture Museum.

Also outdoors are several other aluminum sculptures located at Praça da Luz in the district of Bom Retiro, part of Pinacoteca de São Paulo collection. They are: Botão de Rosa (Rosebud), Carneiro (Ram), Cisne (Swan), Flor Redonda (Round Flower), Papoula (Poppy), Pássaro Imaginário (Imaginary Bird) and Tulipa (Tulip).

The town of Santo Antônio do Pinhal in the State of São Paulo, where the artist had her second Studio, also received two of her works. One is the sculpture Passaredo that since 2000 can be seen at the entrance of the town, and Mãe Lúcia/Mãe Esperança (Mother Lucia/Mother Hope) located at Praça Boulevard Araucária.

== Awards and honors ==
During her career, Odette Eid received various awards and honors in Brazil and in other places in the world:

- 1984 Silver Medal Galeria Arte Skultura, São Paulo-SP, Brazil;
- 1986 Great Gold Medal at 1st Exhibition of Contemporary Art Brazil/EUA, at Curtis Hixon Convention Center, Tampa, Florida, USA;
- 1986 Second and Third Prizes at 19th Exhibition of Contemporary Art Chapel Art Show, São Paulo-SP, Brazil;
- 1987 First Prize at 20th Exhibition of Contemporary Art Chapel Art Show, São Paulo-SP, Brazil;
- 1987 First Prize at 1st Biennial of Annuario Latino-Americano de Artes Plásticas in Buenos Aires, Buenos Aires, Argentina;
- 1987 First Prize at Biennial of Latin American Art, São Paulo-SP, Brazil;
- 1987 Gold Medal at Acropolis Salle de Exposition, Nice, France;
- 1987 Silver Medal at Salão Portinari, São Paulo-SP, Brazil;
- 1987 Bronze Medal at 1st National Arts Exhibition São Paulo-Rio Grande do Sul by Brazilian Arts and Sciences Academy, São Paulo-SP, Brazil;
- 1999 Distinction at the exhibition Quando o Norte e o Sul se Encontram (When North and South Meet), at Mokiti Okada Moa Foundation, São Paulo-SP, Brazil;
- 1999 Medal and Diploma of Artistic and Cultural Merit from Brazilian Academy of Art, Culture and History, São Paulo-SP, Brazil;
- 2003 Honored as Feminine Personality Women’s Day by the Arab Syrian Cultural Center, Esporte Clube Sírio, São Paulo-SP, Brazil;
- 2017 Honor received by the Legislative Assembly of São Paulo

== Notable exhibitions ==
=== In Brazil ===
- 1983 Chelsea Art Gallery, São Paulo-SP, Brazil;
- 1986 Centro Cultural São Paulo, São Paulo-SP, Brazil;
- 1987 Fundação Armando Álvares Penteado (FAAP), São Paulo-SP, Brazil;
- 1987 Museu de Arte Brasileira, São Paulo-SP, Brazil;
- 1988 Galeria de Arte Banespa, São Paulo-SP, Brazil;
- 1988 Place des Arts, Rio de Janeiro (RJ), Brazil;
- 1989 Espaço Cultural Lutèce, São Paulo-SP, Brazil; 1990 Galeria Skultura, São Paulo-SP, Brazil;
- 1991 Centro Cultural Banco Central, São Paulo-SP, Brazil;
- 1994 Galeria de Arte Banespa – DIRPE, São Paulo-SP, Brazil;
- 1995 Museu Brasileiro da Escultura (MuBE), São Paulo-SP, Brazil;
- 1996 Teatro Municipal de São Paulo-SP, São Paulo-SP, Brazil;
- 1996 Centro Cultural São Paulo, São Paulo-SP, Brazil;
- 1997 ECT Galeria de Arte, Brasília (DF), Brazil;
- 1997 Galeria Skultura SP, São Paulo-SP, Brazil;
- 1998 Prestes Maia Gallery, São Paulo-SP, Brazil;
- 1998 Espaço Cultural Hospital Sírio Libanês, São Paulo-SP, Brazil;
- 1999 Espaço Cultural Clube A Hebraica, São Paulo-SP, Brazil;
- 1999 Movimento GNT Mãe et Cia. at Museu da Imagem e do Som, São Paulo-SP, Brazil;
- 1999 Espaço Cultural Personnalité Itaú, São Paulo-SP, Brazil;
- 1999 Espaço Cultural Clube Atlético Monte Líbano, São Paulo-SP, Brazil;
- 1999 Centenário do Clube Espéria, São Paulo-SP, Brazil;
- 2000 Pinacoteca Benedito Calixto, Santos/SP, Brazil;
- 2001 Pinacoteca Benedito Calixto, Santos/SP, Brazil;
- 2002 Salão de Exposição do Centro Cultural Árabe Sírio, São Paulo-SP, Brazil;
- 2002 Galeria de Exposições Completo Cultural Júlio Prestes, São Paulo-SP, Brazil;
- 2002 Museu de Folclore Rossini Tavares de Lima, São Paulo-SP, Brazil;
- 2003 Museu Bandeirante – Legislative Assembly of the State of São Paulo, São Paulo-SP, Brazil;
- 2003 Estação Metrô São Bento, São Paulo-SP, Brazil;
- 2004 Espaço Cultural Claudeteedeca, São Paulo-SP, Brazil;
- 2005 Aluminagem – esculturas em alumínio, at SESC Ipiranga, São Paulo-SP, Brazil;
- 2006 Presépio Esculturas em Tecido Reciclado (Recycled Fabric Crib Sculptures), at TV Cultura, São Paulo-SP, Brazil;
- 2007 Cabeças e Reminiscências (Heads and Reminiscences) at Espaço Cultural V Centenário, Legislative Assembly of the State of São Paulo, São Paulo-SP, Brazil;
- 2007 Presépio E o Menino Chegou... (Crib and the Boy has arrived), at Galeria Altino Arantes, São Paulo-SP, Brazil;
- 2008 Minhas Cabeças (My Heads), at Museu de Arte da Bahia, Salvador/BA, Brazil;
- 2008 Minhas Cabeças (My Heads), at Galeria Estação, São Paulo-SP, Brazil;
- 2017 Pássaros (Birds), at Galeria Estação[33], São Paulo-SP, Brazil.

=== International ===
- 1989 Galerie Liliane François, Paris, France;
- 1991 Galerie Liliane François, Paris, France;
- 1992 Galeria du Théâtre, em Perpignan, França;
- 1998 Le Brésil à Paris – Quadra Découverte, Paris, France;
- 2000 Sculptures – Espace Quadra, Paris, France;
- 2002 Sculptures – Rencontre/Decouverte – Espace Quadra, Paris, France;
- 2005 Espace QUADRA, Paris, France.

=== Group ===
- 1986 I Contemporary Art Exhibition Brazil/United States at Curtis Hixon Convention Center, Tampa, Florida, USA;
- 1987 Acropolis Salle de Exposition, Nice, France;
- 1987 Galerie Del Annuário Latino-Americano de Artes Plásticas, Buenos Aires, Argentina;
- 1988 Brasil Inter Art Galerie, Paris, France;
- 1989 Brazilian-American Cultural Institute, Washington DC, USA;
- 1989 Galerie Liliane François, Paris, France;
- 1990 Galerie Liliane François, Biennale des Femmes no Au Grand Palais, Paris, France;
- 1990 Guingamp Art Fair, Paris, France;
- 1991 Galerie Liliane François, Paris, France;
- 1993 Galerie Liliane François, Paris, France;
- 1993 Le Salon – Grand Palais, Paris, France;
- 1993 Galerie des Isles, Paris, France;
- 1993 EcoSite em La Défense, Paris, France;
- 1994 Salon Européen d'Art Contemporain, Saint-Brisson-sur-Loire, France;
- 1994 Salon des Artistes Français, Paris, France;
- 1995 Galeria de Arte do Casino Estoril, Estoril, Portugal;
- 1995 Galerie Got, Barbizon, France;
- 1996 Galerie du Collège Royal, Beaumont-en-Auge, France;
- 1996 Mairie du 7eme Arrondissement, Lyon, France;
- 1996 Galerie Liliane François, Paris, France;
- 1997 Le Printemps Français en Bavière, Munich, Germany;
- 1997 Salon du Printemps – Palais Municipal, Lyon, France;
- 1997 United States District Court, Washington-Maryland, USA;
- 1998 Salon du Printemps - Palais Municipal, Lyon, France;
- 1998 Le Brésil à Paris at Quadra Découverte, Paris, France;
- 2000 Brésil 500 ans – Galerie Everarts – Exhibition of Brazilian Artists, Paris, France;
- 2000 Du Versant des Andes au delta de l’Amazonie – Saint Gratien Culturel Centre, Saint Gratien, France;
- 2001 Le Brésil à la Maison Pour Tous de Ville d’Avray, Paris, France;
- 2002 Exhibition – United States District Court, Maryland, USA;
- 2002 Made in Brazil - Brazilian Art Group, USA.
