= Ali Eid (disambiguation) =

Ali Eid (1940–2015) was a Lebanese politician. It may also refer to:

- Ahmed Eid (footballer) (born 2001), Egyptian football player
- Ali Abdulla Eid (born 1991), Bahraini handball player
