= Lutfur Rahman Kajal =

Bangladeshi politician

Lutfur Rahman Kazal
- লুৎফুর রহমান কাজল
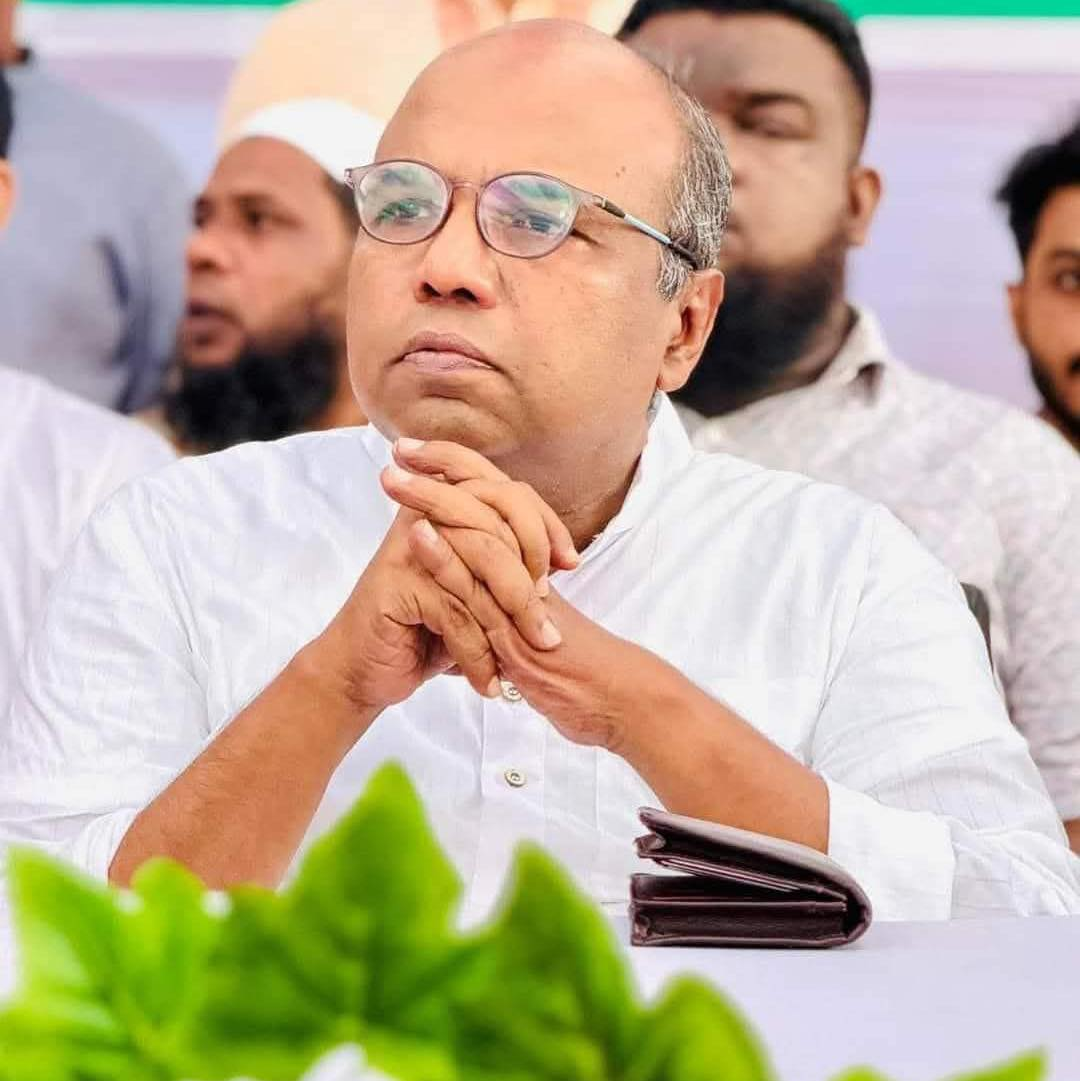
- Kazal in 2026

Member of Parliament
- Incumbent
- Assumed office 17 February 2026
- Preceded by: Shaimum Sarwar Kamal
- Constituency: Cox's Bazar-3
- In office 5 January 2009 – 28 January 2014
- Preceded by: Mohammad Sahiduzzaman
- Succeeded by: Shaimum Sarwar Kamal
- Constituency: Cox's Bazar-3

Personal details
- Born: 18 November 1960 (age 65) Gomatali, Cox's Bazar, East Pakistan
- Party: Bangladesh Nationalist Party
- Parent: Saleha Khanam (mother)
- Website: https://kazal.pro.bd/

Lutfur Rahman Kazal (Bengali: লুতফর রহমান কাজল) is a Bangladesh Nationalist Party politician and a former Member of Parliament from Cox's Bazar-3. He was re-elected as the Member of Parliament for Cox's Bazar-3 in the 2026 general election.

== Early life and education ==
Kazal was born on 18 November 1966 in the village of Gomatali in Cox's Bazar subdivision, then part of the Chittagong District of East Pakistan. His father, Alhaj Mustafizur Rahman, was an industrialist who founded the Niribili Group, while his mother, Saleha Khanam, was a member of the Bangladeshi parliament.

He has a Bachelor of Commerce degree.

== Career ==
Kazal became involved in politics during his student life, joining the Bangladesh Jatiotabadi Chatra Dal. Eventually, he was elected as Secretary of Fishermen Affairs at the BNP National Executive Committee.

Kazal was elected to parliament in 2008 from Cox's Bazar-3 as a Bangladesh Nationalist Party candidate. Prime Minister Sheikh Hasina blamed him for the 2012 Ramu violence in which Muslims attacked Buddhist residents of Ramu Upazila.

Kazal's restaurant was vandalized by activists of Bangladesh Chhatra League along with the nearby Bangladesh Nationalist Party office in July 2024 during the 2024 Bangladesh quota reform movement.
