= Bukahara =

German neofolk band based in Cologne

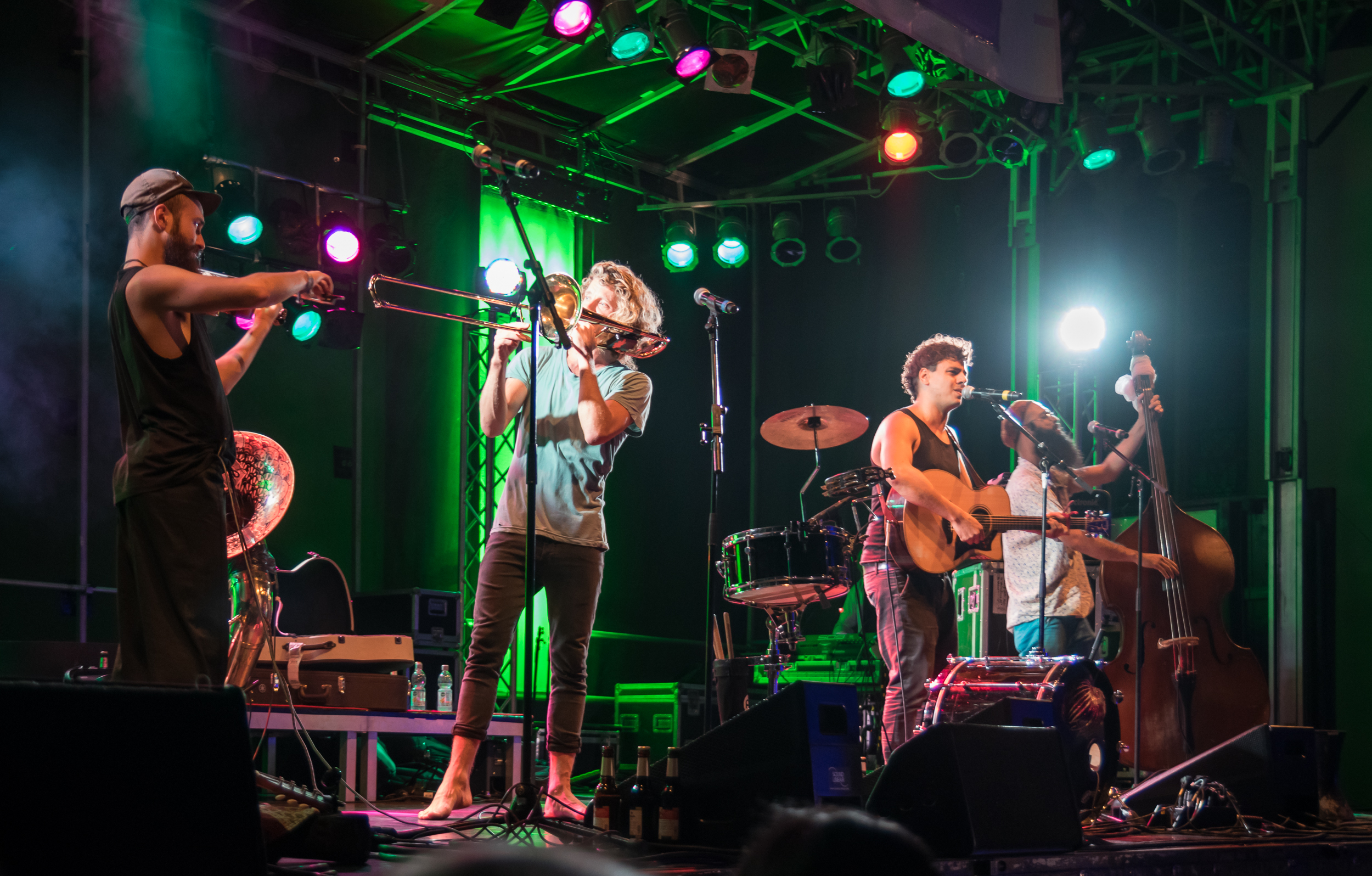
- Bukahara performing in 2016

Background information
- Origin: Cologne, Germany
- Genres: World; folk pop; psychedelic; swing; indie pop
- Years active: 2009–present
- Labels: BML Records; Little Jig Records
- Members: Soufian Zoghlami; Ahmed Eid; Daniel Avi Schneider; Max von Einem

Bukahara are a multinational band formed in Cologne, Germany in 2009 consisting of members Soufian Zoghlami, Ahmed Eid, Daniel Avi Schneider and Max von Einem.

== Members ==
The four multi-instrumentalist members met while studying jazz at the Cologne University of Music. The band started off as a trio before Max von Einem joined, forming the quartet.

- Soufian Zoghlami, lead vocalist, guitarist and drummer, is German of Tunisian descent.
- Ahmed Eid is a Palestinian contrabassist and percussionist. He was born in Syria, grew up in Ramallah and Lebanon, and moved to Lübeck at age 18. Eid released his debut solo EP Aghani Akhira أغاني اخيرة in 2025.
- Daniel Avi Schneider is a Swiss violinist and mandolin player from Zug. He is of Jewish heritage.
- Max von Einem, trombonist, sousaphonist and drummer, grew up in Münster.

== Career ==
Bukahara formed in 2009 and began their career playing together as street buskers. They released their debut album Bukahara Trio in 2013. Their second album Strange Delight followed in 2015. They toured throughout 2015 and 2016.

The group founded the label BML Records, through which they released their third album Phantasma in 2017. In 2018, Bukahara went on tour with the Colombian punk band Doctor Krápula. Eid would go on to appear on Doctor Krápula's song "No Disparen". Bukahara performed at Pohoda 2019.

Bukahara's fourth studio album Canaries in a Coal Mine was released in 2020, produced by Tilman Hopf. The album incorporates political and anti-racist messaging, with allusions to populism. During the COVID-19 lockdown, the band took part in a distanced Above the roofs concert event in Cologne.

Bukahara embarked on a headline tour in 2022. The following year, the band released their fifth album Tales of the Tides and the singles "Same Kind of People" and "Border". Flooding, both literal and metaphorical, provide the nine-track album's theme. Tales of the Tide entered the Official German Charts. Bukahara went on an accompanying tour to support the album. They performed at the 2024 Sziget Festival.

== Discography ==
=== Albums ===
- Bukahara Trio (2013)
- Strange Delight (2015)
- Phantasma (2017)
- Canaries in a Coal Mine (2020)
- Tales of the Tides (2023)

=== Singles ===
- "New Home" (2015)
- "No!" (2017)
- "Afraid No More" (2019)
- "Happy" (2020)
- "Friend" (2021)
- "Storytelling Animal" (2022)
- "Stein" (2022)
- "Same Kind of People" (2023)
- "Border" (2023)
