= Mostaq Ahmad Chowdhury =

Bangladeshi politician

- মোস্তাক আহমদ চৌধুরী

Member of Parliament from undivided Chittagong-14
- In office 1973–1975

Member of Parliament from Chittagong -14

Personal details
- Born: 1932 Lohagara Chittagong
- Died: 1982 (aged 49–50) Chittagong Lohagara zomidar para
- Party: Bangladesh Nationalist party BNP
- Spouse: 1st Hosneara Begum 2nd
- Children: 11

Mostaq Ahmad Chowdhury, known as Mostaq Mia, is a Bangladesh Awami League politician. He was elected a member of parliament from undivided Chittagong-17 (Cox's Bazar Sadar-Ramu) in 1973 and from Cox's Bazar-3 in 1991. He was an organizer of the Bangladesh Liberation War.

== Early life ==
Mostaq Ahmad Chowdhury was born in Cox's Bazar District⋅ His father was Mamtaz Ahmad Chowdhury Khan Bahadur. His wife Kaniz Fatema Mostaq is the president of Cox's Bazar District Women's Awami League and the chairman of Cox's Bazar Jatiya Mohila Songstha. They have one son and one daughter.

== Career ==
Mostaq Ahmad Chowdhury is the chairman of Cox's Bazar district council. He was earlier the administrator of Cox's Bazar district council. In the 1970, he was elected as an MP for the first time as an independent candidate from the then Chittagong-17 (Cox's Bazar Sadar-Ramu) constituency. Then in the first parliamentary elections of 1973, he was elected as a Member of Parliament from the then Chittagong-17 (Cox's Bazar Sadar-Ramu) constituency on the nomination of Awami League for the second time. He was re-elected as an MP from Cox's Bazar-3 (Sadar-Ramu) constituency in the fifth national election in 1991.

He was an organizer of the Bangladesh Liberation War.

He lost the 7th Jatiya Sangsad elections of 12 June 1996 and the 8th Jatiya Sangsad of 2001 from the same constituency with the nomination of Awami League.
