= Mohammad Sahiduzzaman =

Bangladeshi politician

Mohammad Shahiduzzaman
- মোহাম্মদ শহীদুজ্জামান খান

Member of Bangladesh Parliament

Personal details
- Party: Bangladesh Nationalist Party

Mohammad Shahiduzzaman is a Bangladesh Nationalist Party politician and a former member of parliament for Cox's Bazar-3.
