= Cox's Bazar Sadar Upazila =

Cox's Bazar Sadar কক্সবাজার সদর
- Upazila
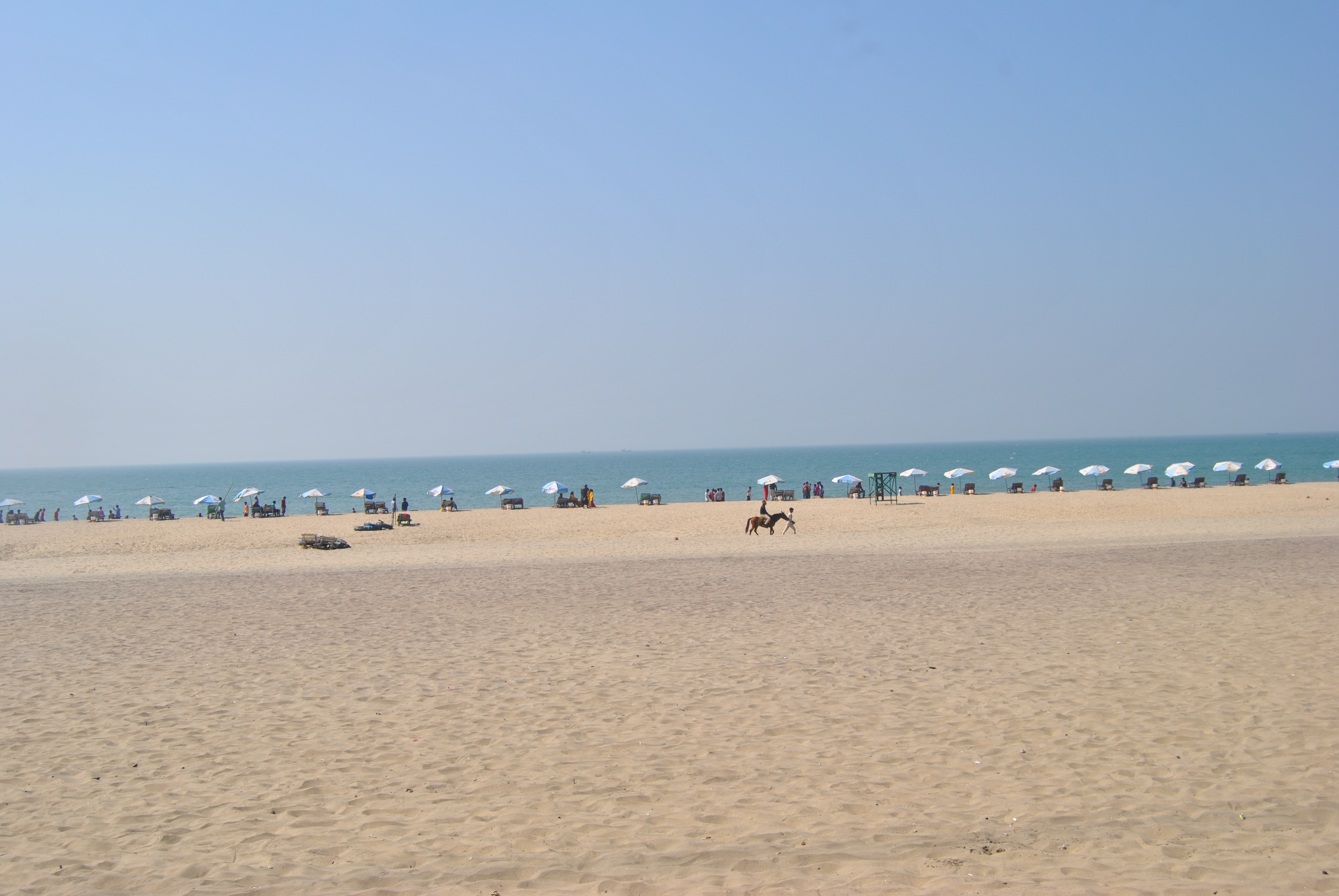
- Cox's Bazar Beach

- Coordinates: 21°27′N 91°59′E
- Country: Bangladesh
- Division: Chittagong
- District: Cox's Bazar

Government
  - Chairman: Vacant
  - UNO: Suraiya Akter Sweety

Area
  - Total: 108.57 km^{2} (41.92 sq mi)

Population (2022)
  - Total: 417,365
  - Density: 3,844.2/km^{2} (9,956.4/sq mi)
- Time zone: UTC+6 (BST)
- Postal code: 4700
- Area code: 0341
- Website: Official Map of Cox's Bazar Sadar

Cox's Bazar Sadar (Bengali: কক্সবাজার সদর) is an upazila of Cox's Bazar District in the Division of Chittagong, Bangladesh.

== Geography ==
Cox's Bazar Sadar is located at 21.4500°N 91.9833°E. It has 60,916 households and total area 108.57 km^{2} (41.92 sq mi).

== Demographics ==
Religions in Cox's Bazar Sadar Upazila (2022)
Religion	Percent
Islam	91.94%
Hinduism	6.23%
Buddhism	1.70%
Other or not stated	0.13%

According to the 2022 Bangladeshi census, Coxs Bazar Sadar Upazila had 90,550 households and a population of 417,365. 11.17% of the population were under 5 years of age. Coxs Bazar Sadar had a literacy rate (age 7 and over) of 77.59%: 78.74% for males and 76.33% for females, and a sex ratio of 108.48 males for every 100 females. 331,355 (79.39%) lived in urban areas.

As of the 2011 Census of Bangladesh, Cox's Bazar Sadar upazila had a population of 417,365. Ethnic population was 4,048 (0.97%), of which the Rakhine were 3,494. At the 1991 Bangladesh census, Cox's Bazar Sadar had a population of 253,788, of whom 117,509 were aged 18 or older. Males constituted 53.94% of the population, and females 46.06%. Cox's Bazar Sadar had an average literacy rate of 28.3% (7+ years), against the national average of 32.4%.

== Administration ==
In 1854, the Cox's Bazar police station and the Town Committee in 1959 were formed. In 1972, the town committee was demolished and turned into a municipality. In 1983, the thana was turned into an upazila.

Cox's Bazar Sadar Upazila is divided into Cox's Bazar Municipality and 5 union parishads: Chowfaldandi, Jhilongjha, Khurushkhul, Pmkhali and Varuakhali. The union parishads are subdivided into 19 mauzas and 185 villages.

Cox's Bazar Municipality is subdivided into 12 wards and 97 mahallas.

== See also ==
- Upazilas of Bangladesh
- Districts of Bangladesh
- Divisions of Bangladesh
