= Cox's Bazar-1 =

Constituency of Bangladesh's Jatiya Sangsad

Coordinates: 21.76°N 92.08°E

- Constituency for the Jatiya Sangsad
- District: Cox's Bazar District
- Division: Chittagong Division
- Electorate: 390,829 (2018)

Current constituency
- Created: 1984
- Party: Bangladesh Nationalist Party
- Member: Salahuddin Ahmed
- ← 293 Chittagong-16 295 Cox's Bazar-2 →

Cox's Bazar-1 is a constituency represented in the Jatiya Sangsad (National Parliament) of Bangladesh since 2026 by Salahuddin Ahmed of the Bangladesh Nationalist Party.

== Boundaries ==
The constituency encompasses Chakaria, Matamuhuri and Pekua upazilas.

== History ==
The constituency was created in 1984 from a Chittagong constituency when the former Chittagong District was split into two districts: Chittagong and Cox's Bazar.

== Members of Parliament ==
Election	Member	Party
1986	A. H. Salahuddin Mahmud	Jatiya Party
1991	Enamul Haq Manju	Bangladesh Jamaat-e-Islami
Feb 1996	Salahuddin Ahmed	Bangladesh Nationalist Party
2001	Salahuddin Ahmed	Bangladesh Nationalist Party
2008	Hasina Ahmed	Bangladesh Nationalist Party
2014	Mohammed Ellias	Jatiya Party (Ershad)
2018	Jafar Alam	Awami League
2024	Syed Muhammad Ibrahim	Bangladesh Kalyan Party
2026	Salahuddin Ahmed	Bangladesh Nationalist Party

== Elections ==
=== Elections in the 2010s ===
Mohammed Ellias was elected unopposed in the 2014 general election after opposition parties withdrew their candidacies in a boycott of the election.

=== Elections in the 2000s ===
General Election 2008: Cox's Bazar-1
Party	Candidate	Votes	%	±%
BNP	Hasina Ahmed	156,512	56.2	−7.2
AL	Salah Uddin Ahmed	121,111	43.5	+8.5
BSD	Rafiqul Ahsan	706	0.3	N/A
National People's Party	Mohammad Iftekhar Uddin	175	0.1	N/A
Majority		35,401	12.7	−15.7
Turnout		278,504	89.3	+14.6
BNP hold				

General Election 2001: Cox's Bazar-1
Party	Candidate	Votes	%	±%
BNP	Salah Uddin Ahmad	134,602	63.4	+17.2
AL	Salah Uddin Ahmed CIP	74,297	35.0	+2.6
IJOF	Abdul Hamid	1,039	0.5	N/A
Independent	Shafiul Alam	655	0.3	N/A
WPB	Abu Md. Bashirul Alam	554	0.3	0.0
Independent	Maksudul Haq Chuttu	406	0.2	N/A
Independent	Md. Shafi Ullah	241	0.1	−0.1
Jatiya Party (M)	Sohrab Hossain	204	0.1	N/A
Independent	Ziauddin	154	0.1	N/A
Independent	Fajlul Karim	81	0.0	N/A
JSD	M. Ali Amir Khan Parvez	60	0.0	N/A
Independent	Nurul Kader	54	0.0	N/A
Independent	Bahadur Shah	49	0.0	N/A
Independent	Nurul Absar	42	0.0	N/A
Majority		60,305	28.4	+14.5
Turnout		212,438	74.7	+0.5
BNP hold				

=== Elections in the 1990s ===
General Election June 1996: Cox's Bazar-1
Party	Candidate	Votes	%	±%
BNP	Salah Uddin Ahmed	72,594	46.2	+31.2
AL	Salah Uddin Ahmed CIP	50,829	32.4	+2.1
Jamaat	Enamul Haq Manju	27,054	17.2	−17.8
IOJ	Md. Abdur Rahim Bakhali	4,313	2.7	N/A
JP(E)	Md. Monwar Alam	1,083	0.7	N/A
WPB	Abu Md. Bashirul Alam	423	0.3	N/A
Independent	Md. Shafi Ullah	296	0.2	N/A
Independent	Md. Rafique Ahmed	212	0.1	N/A
Independent	Md. Ibrahim Chowdhury	89	0.1	N/A
Independent	Momtajul Islam	69	0.0	N/A
Independent	Abul Hossain Monu	64	0.0	N/A
Majority		21,765	13.9	+9.2
Turnout		157,026	74.2	+22.9
BNP gain from Jamaat				

General Election 1991: Cox's Bazar-1
Party	Candidate	Votes	%	±%
Jamaat	Enamul Haq Manju	37,893	35.0	
AL	Johirul Islam	32,849	30.3	
NDP	Salahuddin Quader Chowdhury	20,311	18.7	
BNP	Mahmudul Karim	16,238	15.0	
BAKSAL	S. A. K. Shamsul Huda	484	0.4	
Jatiya Jukta Front	Selim Chowdhury	373	0.3	
Zaker Party	Md. Ibrahim	220	0.2	
Majority		5,044	4.7	
Turnout		108,368	51.3	
Jamaat gain from JP(E)				
