= Salahuddin Ahmed (Cox's Bazar politician) =

Bangladeshi politician (born 1962)

- সালাহউদ্দিন আহমেদ
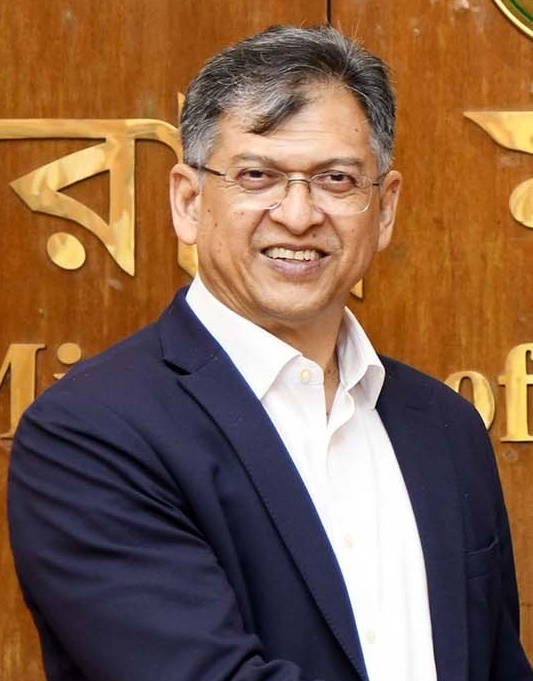
- Ahmed in 2026

Minister of Home Affairs
- Incumbent
- Assumed office 17 February 2026
- Prime Minister: Tarique Rahman
- Preceded by: Jahangir Alam Chowdhury

Member of Parliament
- Incumbent
- Assumed office 17 February 2026
- Preceded by: Syed Muhammad Ibrahim
- Constituency: Cox's Bazar-1
- In office 14 July 1996 – 29 October 2006
- Preceded by: Enamul Haq Manju
- Succeeded by: Hasina Ahmed
- Constituency: Cox's Bazar-1

Minister of State for Communications
- In office 10 October 2001 – 29 October 2006
- Prime Minister: Khaleda Zia
- Preceded by: AKM Amanul Islam Chowdhury
- Succeeded by: Sultana Kamal

Personal details
- Born: 30 June 1962 (age 64) Sikdar Para, Pekua, Cox's Bazar, East Pakistan
- Party: Bangladesh Nationalist Party
- Spouse: Hasina Ahmed
- Children: 4
- Education: University of Dhaka
- Occupation: Politician

Salahuddin Ahmed (Bengali: সালাহউদ্দিন আহমেদ; born 30 June 1962) is a Bangladeshi politician, lawyer and former civil servant who has served as the Home Minister of Bangladesh since 2026. He previously served as the state minister of communication and member of parliament during 1996–2006, and elected as a Member of Parliament from Cox's Bazar-1 constituency twice.

In 2015, he was allegedly subjected to enforced disappearance in Dhaka and reappeared two months later in Shillong, India, under Indian police custody. In 2018, he was acquitted by the Indian court. Later on 28 February 2023, he was also acquitted by the appellate court.

== Early life ==
Ahmed was born on 30 June 1962 in Sikdar Para village of Pekua Sadar Union under Pekua Upazila (then under Chakaria Upazila) in Cox's Bazar. His father was Saeedul Haque, and his mother was Begum Ayesha Haque.

In 1977, Ahmed passed the Secondary School Certificate (SSC) examination from Shilkhali High School in Pekua with record marks. He also achieved outstanding results in the Higher Secondary Certificate (HSC) examination from Chittagong College in 1979. In 1980, he enrolled in the Department of Law at the University of Dhaka, where he completed his LL.B. (Honours) degree in 1984 and his LL.M. degree in 1986 with distinction. During his time at university, he served as a central vice president of the Bangladesh Jatiyatabadi Chhatra Dal and also acted as its president for a period.

== Professional career ==
He passed the 7th Bangladesh Civil Service (BCS) examination in the administration cadre in 1985 and joined government service on 15 February 1988.

Ahmed served as the assistant private secretary to the then prime minister, Khaleda Zia, when the Bangladesh Nationalist Party (BNP) came to power in 1991.

== Political career ==
In 1996, Ahmed resigned from government service and took charge as the convenor of the Cox's Bazar District BNP, later winning the parliamentary election the same year. He was subsequently elected directly through party councils and served two consecutive terms as president of the Cox's Bazar District BNP. In 2010, he was appointed Joint Secretary-General of the BNP's Central Executive Committee at the party's national council. He was later appointed as the State Minister for Communications during 2001–2006 in the third Khaleda cabinet.

Ahmed was arrested in February 2007 following an anti-corruption drive launched by the caretaker government, during which numerous politicians, business leaders, and civil servants were imprisoned. On 25 May 2007, the Anti-Corruption Commission (ACC) filed a case against him alleging that he had accepted a bribe of Tk 1 crore from Mir Zahir Hossain, the owner of Mir Akter Hossain Ltd. On 10 January 2008, Ahmed was sentenced to seven years’ imprisonment for accepting the bribe and was fined Tk 1 crore. The court also ordered the confiscation of the money he had received. He was imprisoned from 6 February 2007 and remained in custody for two years and two months before being released on 29 March 2009. While he was in prison, the ninth parliamentary election was held. During this period, his wife, Hasina Ahmed, contested the Cox's Bazar-1 constituency as a candidate of the Four Party Alliance. She won the seat by defeating her nearest rival by a margin of nearly 36,000 votes and was elected as a Member of Parliament.

Ahmed also served as the joint general secretary of the BNP. In January 2015, he was appointed as the party's spokesperson by Khaleda Zia, following the arrest of the previous spokesperson, Rizvi Ahmed.

== Abduction ==
In March 2015, Ahmed disappeared from Uttara, Dhaka, and the Bangladesh Nationalist Party stated that he had been detained by Bangladeshi law enforcement agencies, reportedly by the Rapid Action Battalion. Ahmed's wife, Hasina Ahmed, alleged that a team identifying themselves as officers of the Detective Branch (DB) police, dressed in plain clothes, took Salahuddin Ahmed from a residence in Uttara after 10:00 p.m. She stated that he had been staying at the house of a distant relative in Sector 3 of Uttara, where the individuals entered by claiming to be DB officers, broke open the door of the second-floor apartment, and took him away. She further claimed that Ahmed was blindfolded and handcuffed before being forced into a vehicle, and that he managed to call her during the incident, but the connection was cut off before he could speak. According to her account, approximately 20 to 25 individuals arrived in six vehicles to carry out the operation.

He reappeared two months later in Shillong, Meghalaya, where he was arrested by Indian police and charged under the Foreigners Act for illegal entry. According to local police, he was found wandering in a disoriented state and was detained after residents alerted authorities, and his identity was later confirmed. Subsequently, Ahmed spoke to the media while being taken from a hospital, stating that he had approached the police voluntarily and alleging that he had been abducted in Dhaka and held in a small room for two months, after which his abductors blindfolded him and transported him by car for several days while frequently changing vehicles. He further claimed that he had not entered India voluntarily and that he had been left in Shillong with his eyes and hands bound. On 3 June 2015, he was charged by Shillong Police and was interned in the North Eastern Indira Gandhi Regional Institute of Health and Medical Sciences, where he was receiving treatment. More than 3 years later, in October 2018, the East Khashi Hill District and Sessions Judge's Court in Meghalaya, India, acquitted him over the trespassing case. While in the Indian jail, the Bangladesh Nationalist Party appointed him as a member of its standing committee. Salahuddin Ahmed was acquitted and granted permission to return home by the appellate court in Shillong on 28 February 2023. On 11 August 2024, following the July Uprising, Ahmed returned to Bangladesh . His travel pass was issued on 6 August by the Assistant High Commissioner of Bangladesh in Guwahati, Assam.

On 17 February 2025, Ahmed stated that no local government elections would be accepted before the holding of the national election. He argued that the national election must take place by December and that the interim government did not have a mandate to conduct local government polls. He also urged the interim administration to immediately announce a roadmap for the national election as a demonstration of goodwill.

On 23 March 2025, BNP submitted its proposals to the National Consensus Commission regarding key recommendations made by five reform commissions. The party presented written proposals concerning reforms to the constitution, public administration, the judiciary, the electoral process, and the Anti-Corruption Commission. A three-member BNP delegation, led by its Standing Committee member Salahuddin Ahmed, formally handed over the proposals to the commission's vice-chairman, Ali Riaz.

On 12 April 2025, the BNP participated in the “March for Gaza” programme to protest against the Gaza genocide. Ahmed led the BNP delegation at the march, which was organised by the Palestine Solidarity Movement Bangladesh.

On 5 June 2025, Ahmed filed a complaint of enforced disappearance with the International Crimes Tribunal. In the complaint, he named former prime minister Sheikh Hasina, along with former home minister Asaduzzaman Khan, former inspectors general of police Benazir Ahmed and AKM Shahidul Hoque, dismissed Major General Ziaul Ahsan, former Dhaka Metropolitan Police commissioner Asaduzzaman Mia, and former Special Branch chief Monirul Islam as respondents.

In the 2026 Bangladeshi general election, Ahmed defeated Jamaat-e-Islami candidate Abdullah Al Farukh by a margin of 95,840 votes. He was subsequently appointed to the Ministry of Home Affairs during the administration led by Tarique Rahman.

Following the victory, Ahmed stated that his party would formally urge the Government of India to extradite former prime minister Sheikh Hasina to Bangladesh to stand trial. He said that the matter would be pursued in accordance with the law and described it as an issue to be addressed between the foreign ministries of Bangladesh and India, adding that his party would call on the Indian government to return her to face trial.

== Controversy ==
On 28 August 2024, Ahmed faced criticism after arriving at a reception in his home area of Pekua, Cox's Bazar, in a vehicle reportedly owned by the S Alam Group. On 2 September, the Bangladesh Nationalist Party issued show-cause notices to Salahuddin Ahmed for breaching party discipline. He later issued an apology. Ahmed stated that he had attended the reception in his constituency after ten years and that he had not personally selected the vehicle from the airport, adding that the arrangements had been made by the local leadership of the Bangladesh Nationalist Party in Chakaria, including its president and general secretary.

== Personal life ==
Ahmed is married to Hasina Ahmed, and the couple have four children: Sayeed Ibrahim Ahmed, Parmiss Ahmed Ikra, Sayeed Yousuf Ahmed and Fariba Ahmed Raida.

== Electoral history ==
Year	Constituency	Party	Votes	%	Result
June 1996	Cox's Bazar-1	BNP	72,594	46.2	Won
2001	Cox's Bazar-1	BNP	134,602	63.4	Won
2026	Cox's Bazar-1	BNP	222,019	63.12	Won
