= Anisur Rahman Zico =

Bangladeshi footballer

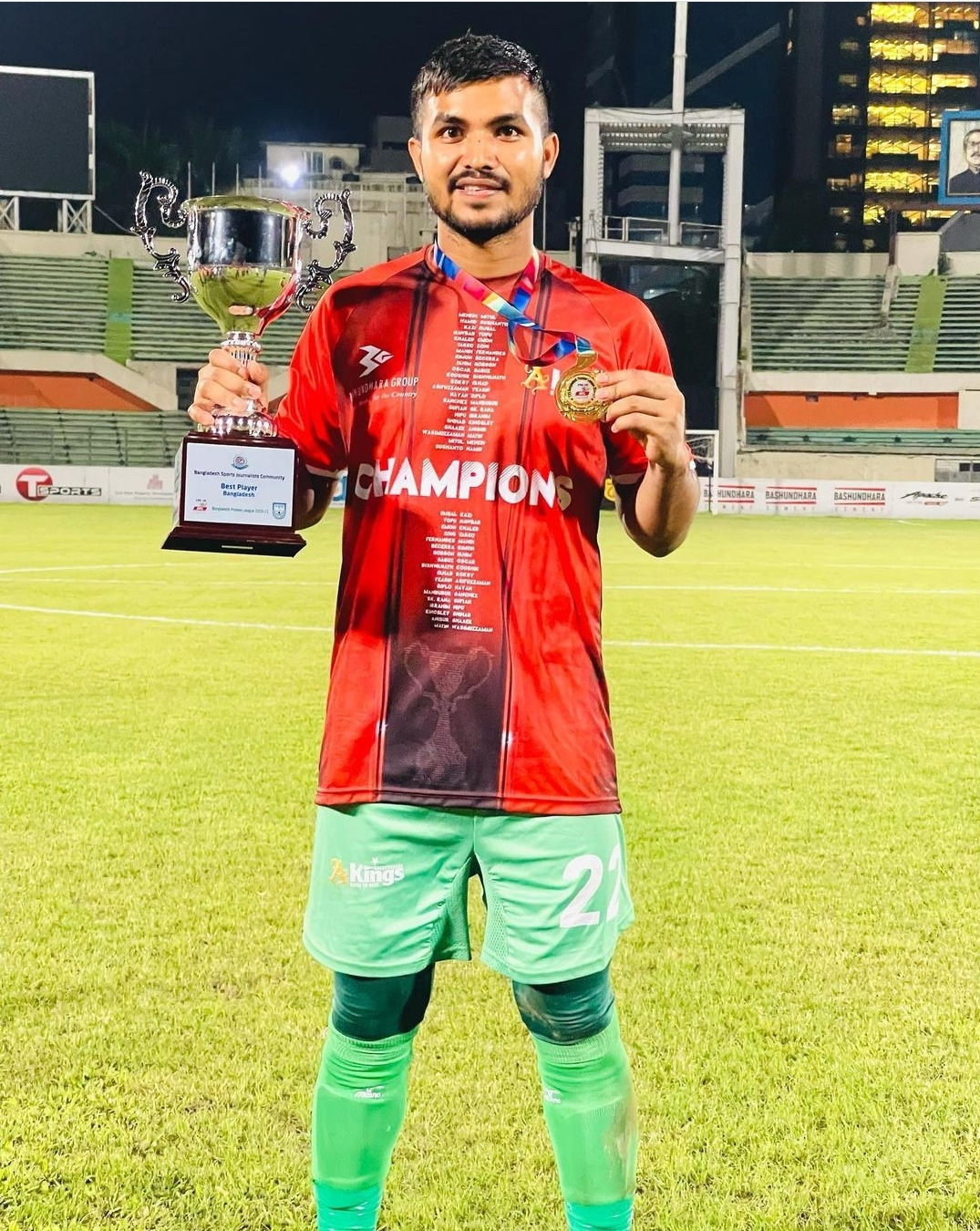
- Zico holding Best Local Player award of Bangladesh Premier League 2021

Personal information
- Full name: Anisur Rahman Zico
- Date of birth: 10 August 1997 (age 29)
- Place of birth: Cox's Bazar, Bangladesh
- Height: 1.77 m (5 ft 10 in)
- Position: Goalkeeper

Team information
- Current team: Mohammedan
- Number: 1

Senior career*
| Years | Team | Apps | (Gls) |
| 2014 | Farashganj SC | 11 | (0) |
| 2015 | Muktijoddha Sangsad | 3 | (0) |
| 2016 | Chittagong Abahani | 1 | (0) |
| 2017–18 | Saif Sporting Club | 9 | (0) |
| 2018–2026 | Bashundhara Kings | 117 | (0) |
| 2026– | Mohammedan | 0 | (0) |

International career^{‡}
| 2015 | Bangladesh U19 | 6 | (0) |
| 2017–2019 | Bangladesh U23 | 6 | (0) |
| 2020– | Bangladesh | 30 | (0) |
Medal record
Representing Bangladesh
South Asian Games
| Bronze medal – third place | 2019 Kathmandu |
- * Club domestic league appearances and goals as of 24 May 2026 ‡ National team caps and goals as of 3 September 2023

Anisur Rahman Zico (Bengali: আনিসুর রহমান জিকো, Bengali pronunciation: [anisur rɔɦman ziko]) is a Bangladeshi professional footballer who plays as a goalkeeper for Bangladesh Premier League club Mohammedan and the Bangladesh national team. He is considered to be a penalty specialist in Bangladesh football circles. He is nicknamed "Banglar Bajpakhi" (Bengali: বাংলার বাজপাখি) which translates to "The Hawk/Falcon of Bangla" in English.

== Early career ==
Zico grew up in Balurchar village in Dulahazara Union, Chakaria, Cox's Bazar District. He initially played football in his locality, often becoming a goalkeeper because other players were reluctant to take the position. In 2007, he impressed spectators with several saves during a local tournament, which encouraged him to continue playing as a goalkeeper. He subsequently received encouragement from Nurul Absar, a local footballer who advised him to attend regular training at the Dulahazara Bahumukhi High School ground.

In 2012, he was selected for the final trial of a Bangladesh U16 training camp, but his family did not allow him to participate. He later travelled to Dhaka for trials with Farashganj SC and signed for the club in 2014, beginning his professional career.

== Club career ==
On 14 December 2018, Zico's performance in the shootout in Walton Independence Cup helped Bashundhara Kings edge a spirited Rahmatganj MFS 3–2 in the quarter-final tiebreaker. On 20 December 2018, Zico's performance propelled Kings to the Independence Cup final with a 7–6 win on penalties over Abahani Limited Dhaka. He also got limelight in the 2020 AFC Cup where he played a crucial role for his team, including three penalty saves which helped Kings win 5–1 against TC Sports Club. He was later named the AFC Top Performer of the Week.

Zico joined Mohammedan in 2026.

== International career ==
On 13 November 2020, Zico made his senior debut against Nepal in an international friendly.

On 4 December 2020, Zico performed well against reigning Asian champions Qatar in 2022 FIFA World Cup qualification – AFC second round. His "heroic" performance gained him popularity among the local fans and also got him offers from MLS and Saudi Pro League clubs.

He received the Best Goalkeeper Award in the 2023 SAFF Championship, even after Bangladesh crashed out of the semi-finals of the tournament.

== Career statistics ==
=== Club ===
As of 18 May 2024.

| Club | Season | League | | | Domestic (Note: Appearance in the Federation Cup) | | Other | | Continental | | Total | |
| Club | Season | Division | Apps | Goals | Apps | Goals | Apps | Goals | Apps | Goals | Apps | Goals |
|---|---|---|---|---|---|---|---|---|---|---|---|---|
| Farashganj SC | 2014 | Bangladesh Championship League | 11 | 0 | — | | — | | — | | 11 | 0 |
| Muktijoddha Sangsad | 2015 | Bangladesh Football League | 3 | 0 | 0 | 0 | — | | — | | 3 | 0 |
| Chittagong Abahani | 2016 | Bangladesh Football League | 1 | 0 | 0 | 0 | 0 (Note: Independence Cup) | 0 | — | | 1 | 0 |
| Saif SC | 2017–18 | Bangladesh Premier League | 9 | 0 | 2 | 0 | 2 | 0 | — | | 13 | 0 |
| Bashundhara Kings | 2018–19 | Bangladesh Football League | 22 | 0 | 6 | 0 | 4 | 0 | — | | 32 | 0 |
| Bashundhara Kings | 2019–20 | Bangladesh Football League | 6 | 0 | 5 | 0 | 3 (Note: Appearance in the Sheikh Kamal International Club Cup) | 0 | 1 (Note: Appearance in the AFC Cup) | 0 | 15 | 0 |
| Bashundhara Kings | 2020–21 | Bangladesh Football League | 21 | 0 | 5 | 0 | — | | 3 | 0 | 29 | 0 |
| Bashundhara Kings | 2021–22 | Bangladesh Football League | 21 | 0 | 0 | 0 | 5 | 0 | 3 | 0 | 29 | 0 |
| Bashundhara Kings | 2022–23 | Bangladesh Football League | 17 | 0 | 2 | 0 | 6 | 0 | 0 | 0 | 25 | 0 |
| Bashundhara Kings | 2023–24 | Bangladesh Football League | 10 | 0 | 0 | 0 | 0 | 0 | 2 | 0 | 12 | 0 |
| Bashundhara Kings | Bashundhara Kings total | | 97 | 0 | 18 | 0 | 18 | 0 | 9 | 0 | 143 | 0 |
| Career total | | | 121 | 0 | 20 | 0 | 20 | 0 | 9 | 0 | 170 | 0 |

=== International ===
As of 3 September 2023.

Appearances and goals by national team and year
| National team | Year | Apps | Goals |
|---|---|---|---|
| Bangladesh | 2020 | 2 | 0 |
| Bangladesh | 2021 | 12 | 0 |
| Bangladesh | 2022 | 8 | 0 |
| Bangladesh | 2023 | 8 | 0 |
| Total | | 30 | 0 |

== Honours ==
Bashundhara Kings

- Bangladesh Premier League: 2018–19, 2020–21, 2021–22, 2022–23, 2023–24, 2025–26
- Bangladesh Federation Cup: 2019–20, 2020–21, 2023-24, 2024-25, 2025-26
- Independence Cup: 2018–19, 2022–23, 2023–24
- Challenge cup: 2024, 2025

Individual

- 2020–21, 2021–22, 2022–23 − BPL Goalkeeper of the Season.
- 2023 – SAFF Championship Best Goalkeeper Award.
