= Floods in Bangladesh =

Bangladesh, being situated on the Brahmaputra River Delta (also known as the Ganges Delta) is a land of many rivers, and as a result is very prone to flooding. Due to being part of such a basin and being less than 5 meters above mean sea level, Bangladesh faces the cumulative effects of floods due to water flashing from nearby hills, the accumulation of the inflow of water from upstream catchments, and locally heavy rainfall enhanced by drainage congestion. Bangladesh faces this problem almost every year. Coastal flooding, combined with the bursting of river banks is common, and severely affects the landscape and society of Bangladesh. 83% of Bangladesh is floodplain, and it has an extensive sea coastline, rendering the nation very much at risk of periodic widespread damage. Whilst more permanent defenses, strengthened with reinforced concrete, are being built, many embankments are composed purely of soil and turf and made by local farmers. Flooding normally occurs during the monsoon season from June to September. The convectional rainfall of the monsoon is added to by relief rainfall caused by the Himalayas. Meltwater from the Himalayas is also a significant input.

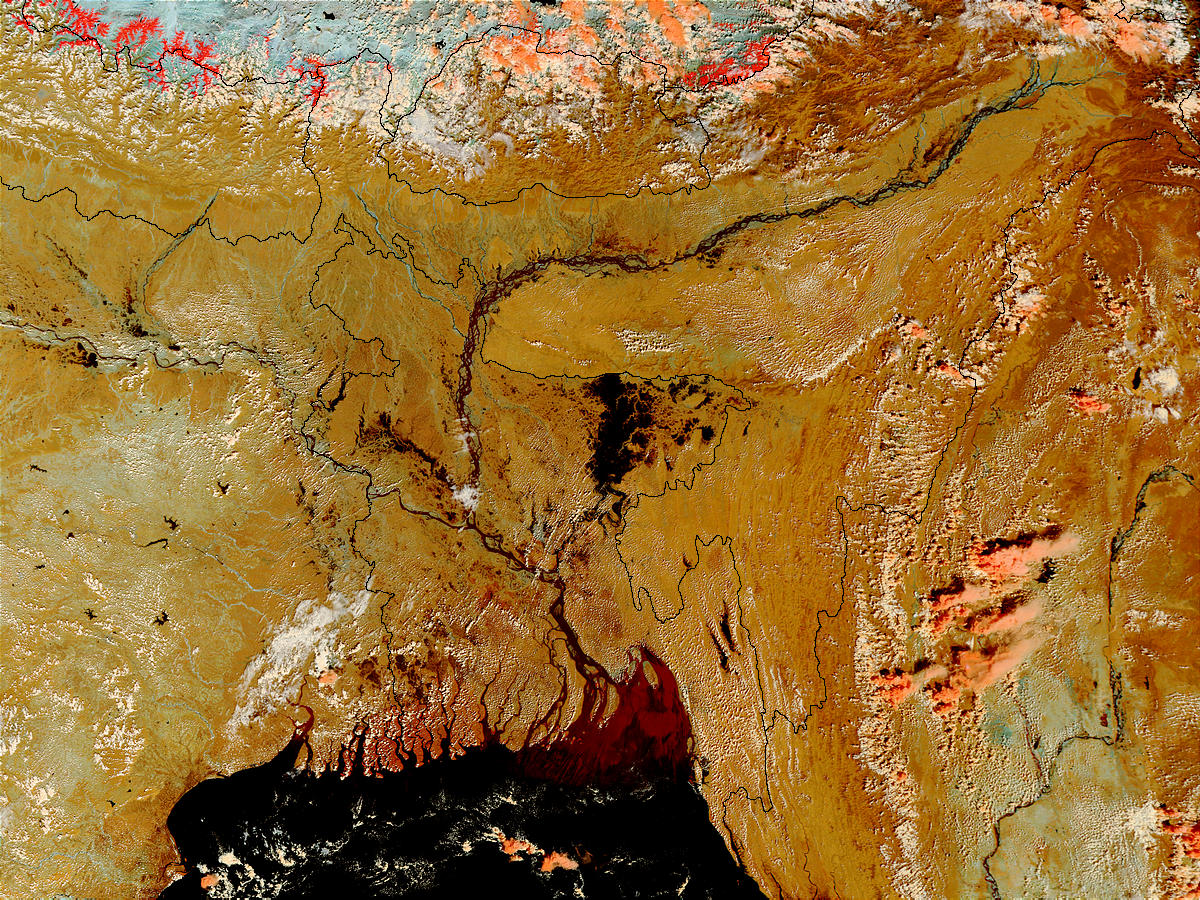
In late summer 2002, heavy monsoon rains led to massive flooding in eastern India, Nepal, and Bangladesh, killing over 500 people and leaving millions homeless. This true-color image, acquired by the Moderate Resolution Imaging Spectroradiometer (MODIS) aboard NASA's Terra spacecraft begins on 5 August 2002, shows the extent of this flooding. In the upper right-hand corner of the image, the swollen Brahmaputra River runs east to west through the Indian state of Assam. Normally, the river and its tributaries would resemble a tangle of thin lines. Moving to the upper left-hand corner, flooding can be seen along the Ganges River in the state of Bihar, India.

Each year, on average, 31,000 square kilometres (12,000 sq mi) (around 21% of the country) is flooded. During severe floods the affected area may exceed two-thirds of the country, as was seen in 1998. Only about 20% of streamflow is generated by rainfall within Bangladesh. The other 80% flows in from catchment areas outside the country, overwhelmingly via three main rivers: the Ganges, the Brahmaputra-Jamuna and the Meghna. The floods have caused devastation in Bangladesh throughout history, especially in 1951, 1987, 1988 and 1998. The 2007 South Asian floods also affected a large portion of Bangladesh.

== Benefits of flooding ==
Small scale flooding in Bangladesh is required to sustain the agricultural industry, as sediment deposited by floodwaters fertilises fields. The water is required to grow rice, so natural flooding replaces artificial irrigation, which is time-consuming and costly to build. Salt deposited on fields from high rates of evaporation is removed during floods, preventing the land from becoming infertile. The benefits of flooding are clear in El Niño years when the monsoon is interrupted. As El Niño becomes increasingly frequent, and flood events appear to become more extreme, the previously reliable monsoon may be succeeded by years of drought or devastating floods. Despite all of this, floodings also have very positive effects and it is that corn grows on the water, with the floodings corn can grow benefiting agriculture and the economy in the area.

== Types of floods ==
While the issue of flooding and the ongoing efforts to limit its damages are prevalent throughout the entire country, several types of floods have recently occurred regularly, affecting different areas in their own distinct way. These flood types include:

- flash floods in hilly areas
- monsoon floods during monsoon season
- normal bank floods from the major rivers, Brahmaputra, Ganges, and Meghna
- rain-fed floods

== Historic floods ==
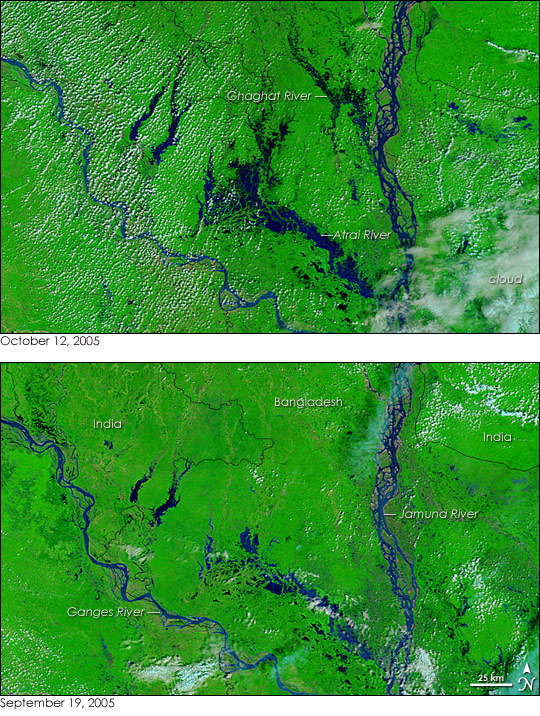
Dozens of villages were inundated when rain pushed the rivers of northwestern Bangladesh over their banks in early October 2005. The Moderate Resolution Imaging Spectroradiometer (MODIS) on NASA's Terra satellite captured the top image of the flooded Ghaghat and Atrai Rivers on 12 October 2005. The deep blue of the rivers is spread across the countryside in the flood image.

The country has a long history of destructive flooding that has had very adverse impacts on lives and property. In the 19th century, six major floods were recorded: 1842, 1858, 1871, 1875, 1885, and 1892. Eighteen major floods occurred in the 20th century. Those of 1951, 1987, 1988 and 1998 were of catastrophic consequence. More recent floods include 2004 and 2010.

The catastrophic floods of 1987 occurred throughout July and August and affected 57,300 square kilometres (22,100 sq mi) of land (about 40% of the total area of the country) and were estimated as a once in 30-70 year event. The seriously affected regions were on the western side of the Brahmaputra, the area below the confluence of the Ganges and the Brahmaputra, and considerable areas north of Khulna.

The flood of 1988, which was also of catastrophic consequence, occurred throughout August and September. The waters inundated about 82,000 square kilometres (32,000 sq mi) of land, (about 60% of the area), and its return period was estimated at 50–100 years. Rainfall, together with synchronisation of very high flows of the three major rivers of the country in only three days, aggravated the flood. Dhaka, the capital of Bangladesh, was severely affected. The flood lasted 15 to 20 days.

In 1998, over 75% of the total area of the country was flooded, including half of Dhaka. It was similar to the catastrophic flood of 1988, in terms of the extent of the flooding. A combination of heavy rainfall within and outside the country and synchronisation of peak flows of the major rivers contributed to the flood. 30 million people were made homeless, and the death toll reached over a thousand. The flooding caused contamination of crops and animals, and unclean water resulted in cholera and Typhoid fever outbreaks. Few hospitals were functional because of damage from the flooding, and those that were open had too many patients, resulting in everyday injuries becoming fatal due to lack of treatment. 700,000 hectares of crops were destroyed, 400 factories were forced to close, and there was a 20% decrease in economic production. Communication within the country also became difficult.

The 1999 floods, although not as serious as the 1998 floods, were still very dangerous and costly. The floods occurred between July and September, causing many deaths, and leaving many people homeless. The extensive damage had to be paid for with foreign assistance. The entire flood lasted approximately 65 days.

The 2004 flood was very similar to the 1988 and 1998 floods, with two-thirds of the country under water.

In early October 2005, dozens of villages were inundated when rain caused the rivers of northwestern Bangladesh to burst their banks. The floods that hit Bangladesh in 2007 affected 252 villages in 40 districts causing millions of people became homeless.

Floods also occurred in 2007, 2009,2013,2014,2015,2017,2022 and 2024.

== 2017 floods in Bangladesh ==
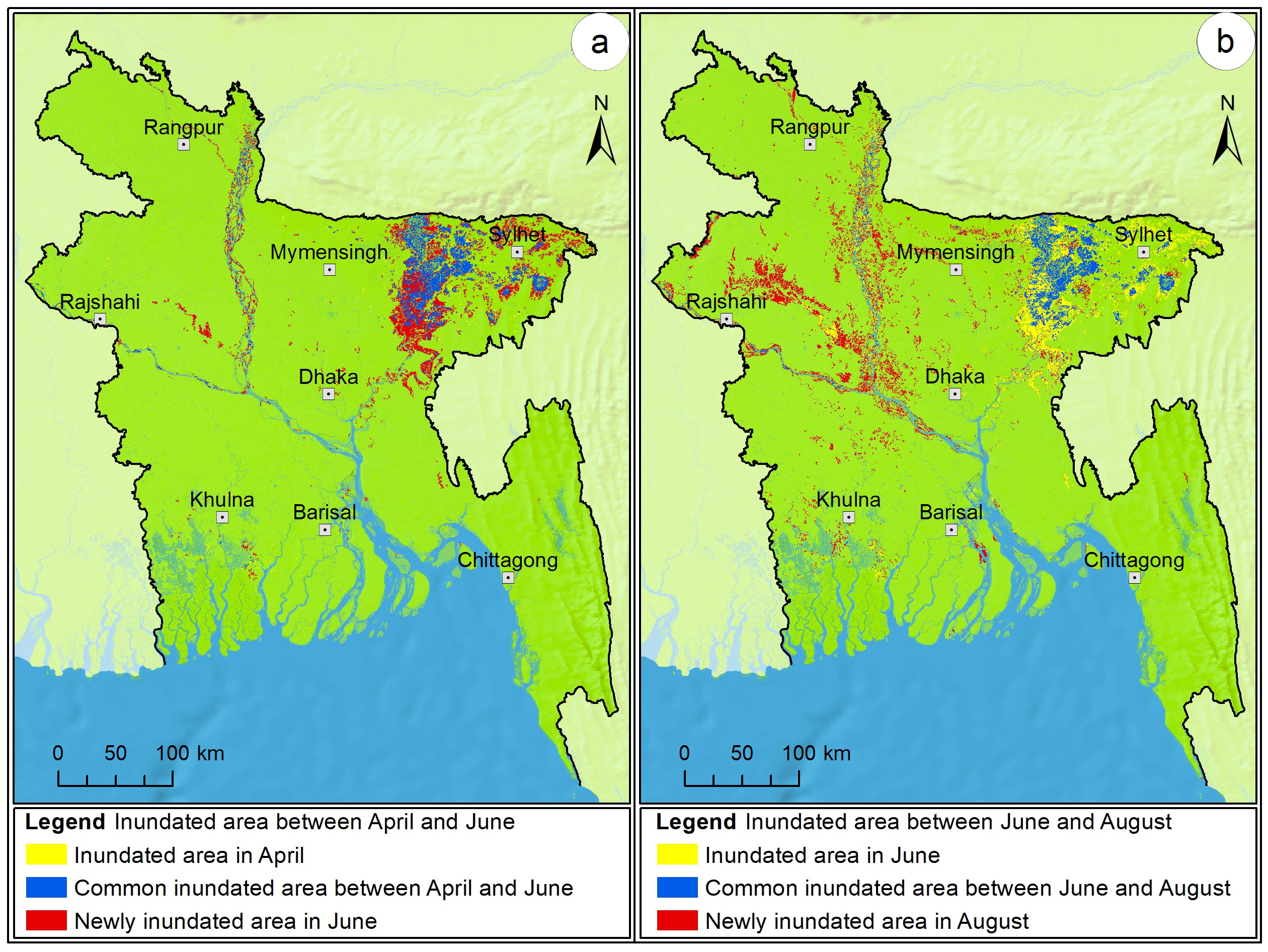
2017 Flood situation in Bangladesh

In 2017, unpredicted early heavy rain caused flooding in several parts of Bangladesh and damaged pre-harvested crops in April. The April flood continued until the last week of August and caused substantial damage to housing, property, and infrastructure. Inundation maps of Bangladesh for March, April, June, and August 2017, based on Sentinel-1 images, show that in March 2017 perennial waterbodies covered 5.03% of Bangladesh. In April, a total flood-inundated area was 2.01%, most inundation occurring in cropland (1.51%), followed by rural settlement and homestead orchard areas (0.21%) and other areas (0.29%). Similarly, more area was inundated during the catastrophic June and August months, with inundation covering 4.53% and 7.01%, respectively.

== 2026 floods in Bangladesh ==
In July 2026, heavy rainfall and flash floods have killed at least 51 people and affected more than a million residents, with Cox's Bazar accounting for 28 of the deaths. The disaster has caused widespread displacement, with thousands taking shelter in government facilities as flooding submerged streets in Dhaka and prompted evacuations, exam postponements, and criticism of the capital's drainage systems.

== Climate variability ==
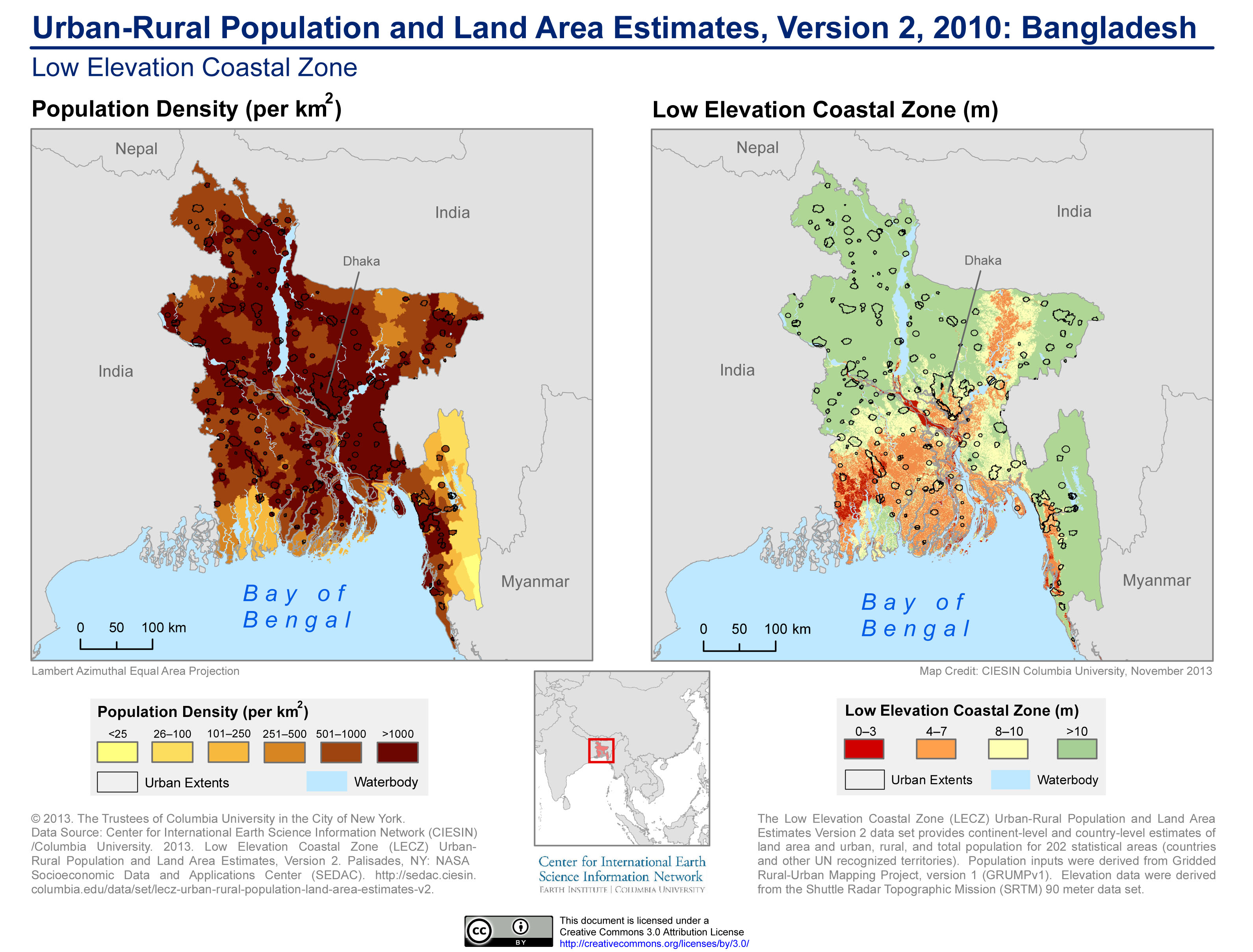
Population density and height above sea level in Bangladesh (2010). Bangladesh is especially vulnerable to sea level rise.

From March to September in a typical year, the citizens of Bangladesh are the most susceptible to major flooding, as a mixture of the monsoon seasons and the rising of major rivers and their tributaries reach their peak as the snow starts to melt and the rain starts to pour.

Widespread flooding in Bangladesh, as seen in 1988, 1998, and 1991, has caused widespread destruction in one of the least developed countries in the world. With three of the world's mightiest river systems and being situated in the world's largest delta, riverbank erosion is taking away precious land from the small nation with a growing population every year. The economic development of the rural sphere is largely intertwined, as every year the populace loses property and livelihood. South Asian people, 70 percent of whom live in rural areas, also account for 75 percent of the poor, most of whom rely on agriculture for their livelihood. Each year they are disproportionately affected by the effects of climate change. Three catastrophes—the 1991 Bangladesh cyclone, the May 1997 Bangladesh cyclone, and Cyclone Sidr in 2007—cost the nation around a quarter of a million of its residents. There needs to be serious considerations to mitigate the effects of climate change and invest in capacity building of each system component to secure the future of this country.

This global change is likely to have a more dramatic effect on global agriculture than previously predicted, meaning that the world hunger situation and Bangladesh's food security issues will only get worse. The difference between historical and projected average temperatures each season throughout the world has revealed that harvests from major staple crops could drop by 40 percent by the end of the 21st century due to high temperatures in the growing seasons. A research study predicted this by using the patterns and characteristics of 23 global climate models. Not only are the harvests affected, but the grain yield is also predicted to decrease anywhere from 3 to 15 percent.

The overall damage:

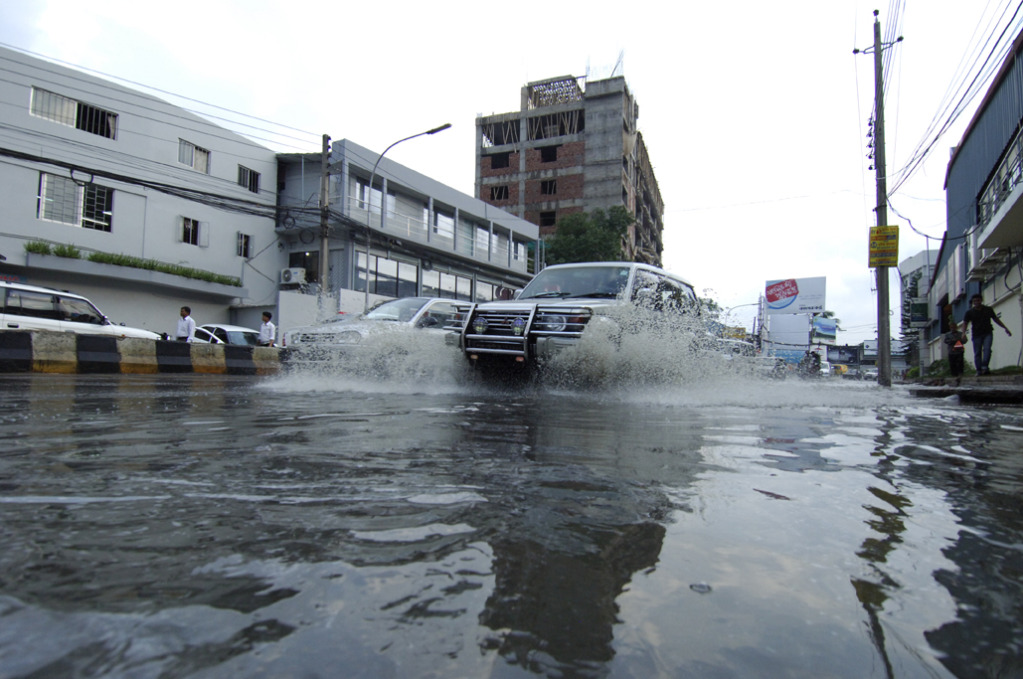
Flood in Dhaka, Bangladesh

- Half of the districts were affected
- 100,000 square kilometres (39,000 sq mi) (66%) of the country was overwhelmed
- 1,050 deaths reported
- 30 million people affected
- 25 million people left homeless
- 26,000 livestock lost
- 20,000 education facilities damaged
- 300,000 wells damaged
- 16,000 kilometres (9,900 mi) of roads flooded
- 4,500 kilometres (2,800 mi) of river embankments destroyed
- 32 percent of the total population affected

== Flood preparation ==
Yearly flooding during monsoon season and other forms of inclement weather have forced the people of Bangladesh to adjust their lifestyle in order to prepare for the worst. One thing that people are doing to avoid the effects of the flooding is building elevated houses and roads. The raised houses are built on platforms raised above the typical water level a flood can reach. In many cases, neighbourhoods of people build these raised homes and roads, creating a "cluster village" which is essentially a village that is raised above flood level. This has proven to be very effective at avoiding the immediate effects of flooding.

Additionally, organisations such as the Global Fund for Children and the Bill & Melinda Gates Foundation have taken the initiative of helping kids rebuild their lives after natural disasters by building schools that function on boats themselves. "Floating schools", as these classrooms are known, help provide an education for children whose lives were drastically affected by the effects of constant flooding. Furthermore, children, who even prior to a natural disaster, did not receive proper schooling benefited from the opening of floating schools, making these communities into beneficial learning spots.

However, there are effects from flooding that cannot be avoided simply by raising houses above flood level. Water contamination, for example, is very difficult to cope with during floods. Because of this, many people in Bangladesh use a tube well, which is a well with a top that is raised high enough that contaminated floodwater from a flood cannot enter it. Many cities also have flood shelters, which are large raised platforms where people can find refuge from the effects of the on-rushing flood. As a result of several demanding summer floods, in 2004, the government of Bangladesh made the step of seeking foreign aid rather than trying to assist the millions of homeless people on their own. Nearly all the 147 million people living in Bangladesh at the time (crammed into a space the size of Iowa) were forced to adapt to intense rainfall and water-borne disease exposed conditions. An increase of salinity, a lack of food distributors, and the effects of seeing slum dwellers survive on floodwater were just the initial blows to a monumental flood season that summer, extending beyond Bangladesh's borders and affecting India, China, Nepal, and Vietnam as well.

These may be great solutions to the problem of flooding, but some cities do not have raised houses or flood shelters. These cities typically have rescue boats that can search for people who were unable to get above flood level and help them get out of the water. These boats are very important; they rescue over a thousand people over the course of multiple years.

=== Flood shelter suitability areas in Bangladesh ===
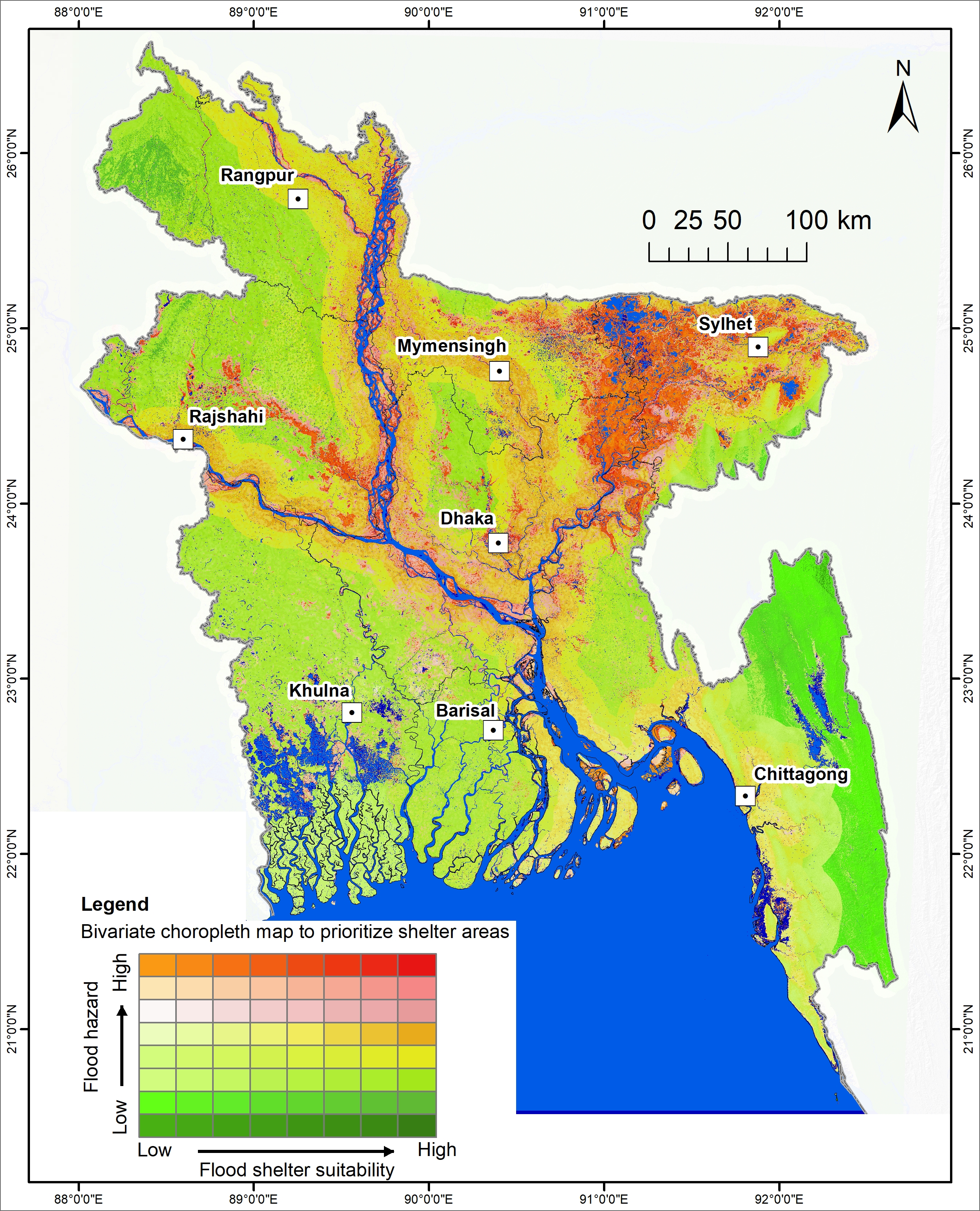
Recognized priority area for flood emergency shelter construction based on the bivariate choropleth analysis using flood shelter suitability and flood hazard maps in Bangladesh.

To mitigate the impact of flood disasters, it is crucial to understand the areas that are flooded by water. At the same time, flood-affected families also can get a safe location to shelter. In Bangladesh, most rural homes are situated in low-lying floodplain regions, which are highly vulnerable to flooding. Many of these residences are inundated during flooding and come to be unsuitable for habitation. In this case, emergency lodging in temporary flood shelters is necessary for the affected families. The place of the flood shelter concerning the distance from the community and accessibility is crucial for useful evacuation and relocation. The flood shelter must be accessible and close to a settlement to ensure efficient evacuation and relocation.

On the other hand, the shelters should be built in an area free from the risk of flooding. Over time, a good number of safe cyclone shelters have been established in the coastal regions of Bangladesh. However, in the flood-prone northern and central regions and the flood-prone area near the major rivers, a few designated flood emergency shelters exist other than a few elevated homesteads. In most cases, these small figures of flood shelters are not located in flood-prone areas to evacuate most people. Therefore, many factors related to flood pronouns, protection, and convenience, should be considered when identifying suitable sites for flood shelters. In this case, remote sensing and geographic information systems can play a vitally important role in finding suitable locations for flood shelters.

== Coverage of inundation and deaths in major floods, 1954-1998 ==
Year	Flooded area (km^{2})	Percentage of total area	Number of deaths
1954	36920	25	112
1955	50700	34	129
1956	35620	24	
1962	37404	25	117
1963	43180	29	
1968	37300	25	126
1970	42640	28	87
1971	36475	24	120
1974	52720	35	1987
1984	28314	19	513
1987	57491	39	1657
1988	77700	52	2379
1998	100000	67	1050

== Table of flood damage in Bangladesh (1953-1998) ==
Year	Crop damage (million tons)	Total financial loss (million taka)
1953	0.6	
1954	0.7	1500
1956	0.5	1580
1962	1.2	1500
1966	1.0	600
1968	1.1	1200
1969	1.0	1100
1970	1.2	1000
1974	1.4	20000
1980	0.4	4000
1984	0.7	4500
1987	1.5	35000
1988	3.2	40000
1998	4.5	142160

== See also ==
- 2007 Chittagong mudslides
- August 2024 Bangladesh floods
- 2026 Chittagong flood
