= Krisnapur, Chakaria =

Krisnapur
- village
- Location within Bangladesh
- Coordinates: 21°47′N 92°00′E
- Country: Bangladesh
- Division: Chittagong
- Zila: Cox's Bazar
- Upazila: Chakaria Upazila
- Time zone: UTC+06

Krisnapur is a Bangladeshi village situated in Chakaria Upazila. According to the 2011 Bangladesh census, Krisnapur had 273 households and a population of 1,139.

== Education ==
- Krisnapur Govt. Primary School
