= 2026 Chittagong floods =

Monsoon floods in Chittagong, Bangladesh

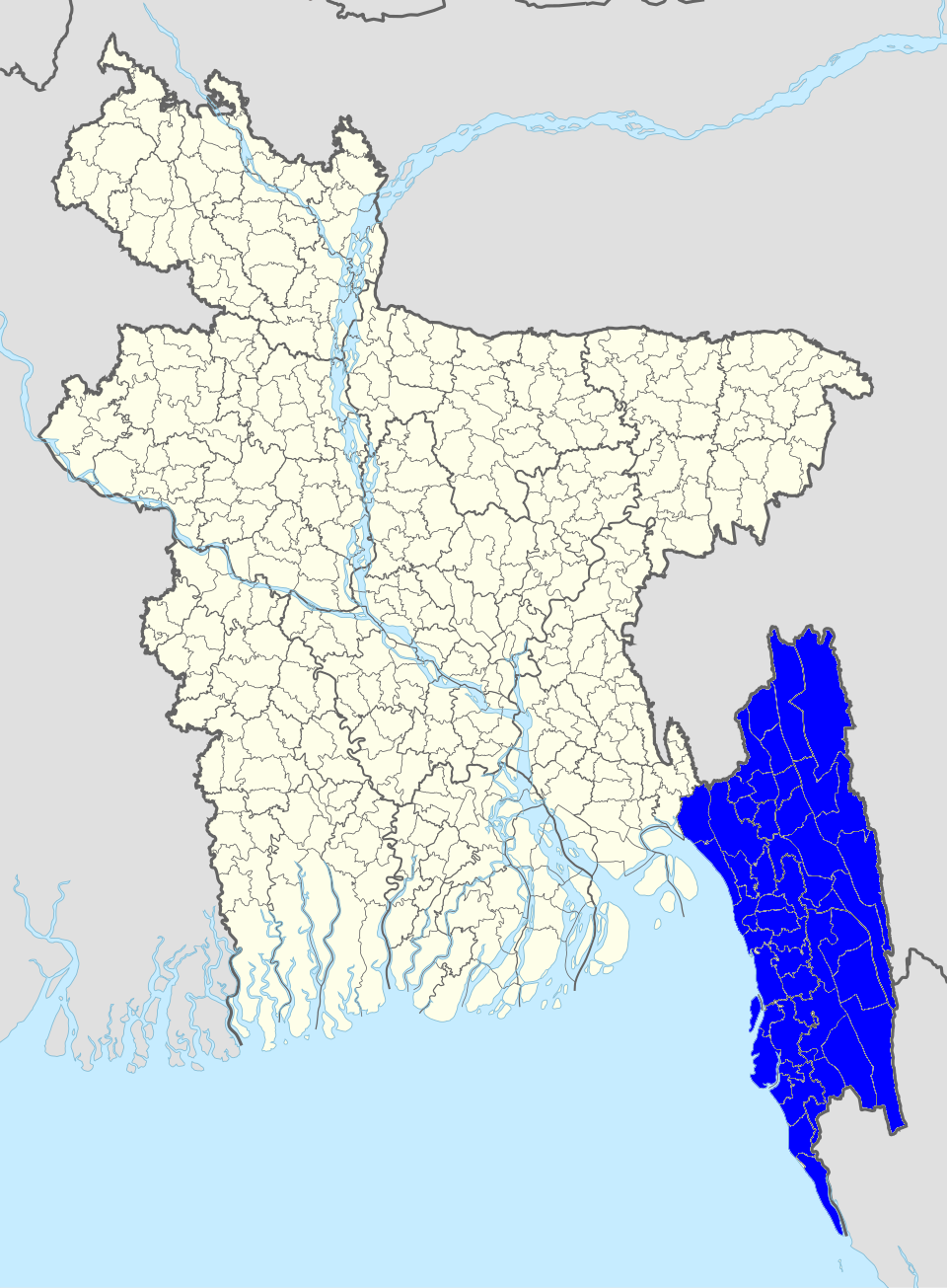
- Flooded area of Southeastern Bangladesh
- Date: July 2026
- Location: Greater Chittagong
- Cause: Monsoon rainfall
- Deaths: 50+
- Displaced: 800,000+

Heavy rainfall and upstream hill torrents during the 2026 monsoon season resulted in severe flooding and landslides across Greater Chittagong region in Bangladesh. Impacts included loss of crops, livestock, electricity supply and disruption to the Higher Schools Certificate, which caused political protests.

== Events ==
During flood, at least 8 lakhs people of Greater Chittagong become affected. It was severe in Satkania Upazila, Banshkhali Upazila, Chandanaish Upazila and Lohagara Upazila of Chittagong District. It also affected Chakaria Upazila and Pekua Upazila of Cox's Bazar District.

== 2026 HSC student protests ==
The 2026 HSC student protests are an ongoing series of student demonstrations and civic disruptions across Bangladesh, primarily led by Higher Secondary Certificate (HSC) examinees. The movement intensified in mid-July 2026 following student grievances regarding mass non-participation due to regional flooding, alleged discrepancies in examination question papers, and subsequent political friction involving the Ministry of Education. The active street blockades were temporarily suspended on 15 July 2026 after the government formally announced six major relief initiatives addressing the core demands.

The 2026 Higher Secondary Certificate (HSC) and equivalent examinations commenced on 2 July 2026. Prior to the examinations, reports emerged indicating an unprecedented drop in examinee registration, with over 550,000 previously regular students failing to fill out examination forms, heavily attributed to economic challenges and severe seasonal flooding in the Chattogram and Sylhet regions. Following the commencement of exams on July 2, localized student demonstrations began in flood-affected districts, with examinees demanding the postponement of schedules due to waterlogging and missing admit cards.

Public dissatisfaction surged following the administration of the Physics First Paper examination, during which students reported major inconsistencies and errors. Tensions escalated significantly after controversial public statements were made by the newly appointed Education Minister, A. N. M. Ehsanul Hoque Milan, which students deemed dismissive of their academic hardships. Public anger intensified further following the leak of a WhatsApp phone call on social media, in which the Education Minister reportedly referred to the protesting examinees as "farm chickens" who caught a cold in a "little rain." The remark sparked widespread outrage among the student population, shifting the primary focus of the demonstrations from examination scheduling grievances to demanding the immediate resignation of the minister.

=== 14 July ===
Mass escalations occurred across the capital city of Dhaka. Thousands of students blockaded major transport intersections, including the Science Lab intersection, Shahbagh, Uttara, and Mirpur. Delegations of students initiated a march toward the National Parliament Building on Manik Mia Avenue, chanting slogans demanding immediate systemic reforms and the resignation of the Education Minister. Outside Dhaka, students blockaded major national highways in Bogura and the Dhaka-Barishal highway, while candidates in Chittagong staged demonstrations outside the Chittagong Education Board and blocked local intersections to demand equitable exam schedules due to the severe regional flooding. During the Dhaka demonstrations, student political groups reported detaining outside individuals attempting to disrupt the protests. Amid the mounting pressure, Education Minister Milan issued a formal apology during a parliamentary session, stating that he did not intend to demean anyone and regretted if his words caused hurt. He additionally announced that the ministry was evaluating options to retake the heavily disrupted exams from July 13.

=== 15–16 July ===
Protesters marched from the Science Lab intersection toward the Education Building for a scheduled "Long March to the Education Ministry." A six-member student delegation entered the Secretariat to negotiate directly with ministry officials. Following the meeting, the representatives announced a temporary suspension of street blockades to allow students to sit for their remaining scheduled exams, warning that demonstrations would resume if the government's concessions were unfulfilled. On 16 July, student organizers held subsequent press conferences detailing their updated 6-point charter monitoring the implementation of government promises.

=== Demands ===
Following the negotiations on 15 July, the student representatives revised their demands into a unified 6-point charter, shifting focus away from their initial call for the minister's resignation to structural relief, which included:

1. Optional Retests: An opportunity for examinees severely affected by adverse weather and regional flooding to retake skipped or heavily disrupted examinations.
2. Score Optimization: Grade evaluation adjustments ensuring that the higher score between the original and retaken exams is the one officially recognized.
3. Flawed Paper Redress: Full marks automatically awarded to all candidates for the error-laden questions on the Physics First Paper examination.
4. Academic Breathing Room: A brief, temporary suspension of ongoing examinations to provide sufficient preparation intervals and mental relief for stressed candidates.
5. Evaluation Leniency: Fair consideration in marking scales to compensate for unannounced, sudden changes in the question-paper format.
6. Conducive Exam Environment: Measures to ensure invigilators maintain a calm and supportive environment inside halls, alongside a demand for an official apology regarding police action against protesters on July 14.

== Reaction ==
=== Domestic ===
On 14 July 2026, Education Minister A. N. M. Ehsanul Hoque Milan addressed the Parliament, formally expressing regret over his previous "farm chicken" remarks regarding the examinees, stating he did not intend to hurt anyone's feelings. He also announced that the ministry was actively reviewing whether the three exams held on 13 July despite heavy rains could be retaken for affected students, and confirmed that examinees would be awarded full marks for any flawed questions on the Physics paper.

On 15 July, the Prime Minister's Adviser on Education and PMO spokesperson, Dr. Mahdi Amin, outlined five major student-friendly initiatives enacted by the government to de-escalate the crisis. These initiatives included: allowing flood-affected candidates in other districts to sit for fresh tests alongside the postponed exams under the Chattogram Board, instructing local administrations to dynamically relocate test centers or extend examination hours during waterlogging, and prioritizing student welfare during the evaluation process.

On 16 July, Home Minister Salahuddin Ahmed addressed the media at the Secretariat. While stating that the police had been instructed not to take punitive action against the demonstrating students, he warned that a "vested quarter" was actively attempting to "fish in troubled waters" and exploit the academic grievances to embarrass the administration, noting that many active participants in the recent blockades were not actual examination candidates.

On 18 July, the Education Minister further expanded on the administration's stance during a speech at Naogaon University. He firmly dismissed the ongoing social media backlash, stating that online "trolling" and fabricated allegations would not hinder the government's educational reform goals, and urged the media to refrain from amplifying misleading online campaigns regarding the exam system.

=== International ===
- Pakistan: Pakistan Prime Minister Shehbaz Sharif sent a condolence message.
- UAE: The Ministry of Foreign Affairs of the UAE expressed condolences.
