= Chakaria Upazila =

Chakaria চকরিয়া
- Upazila
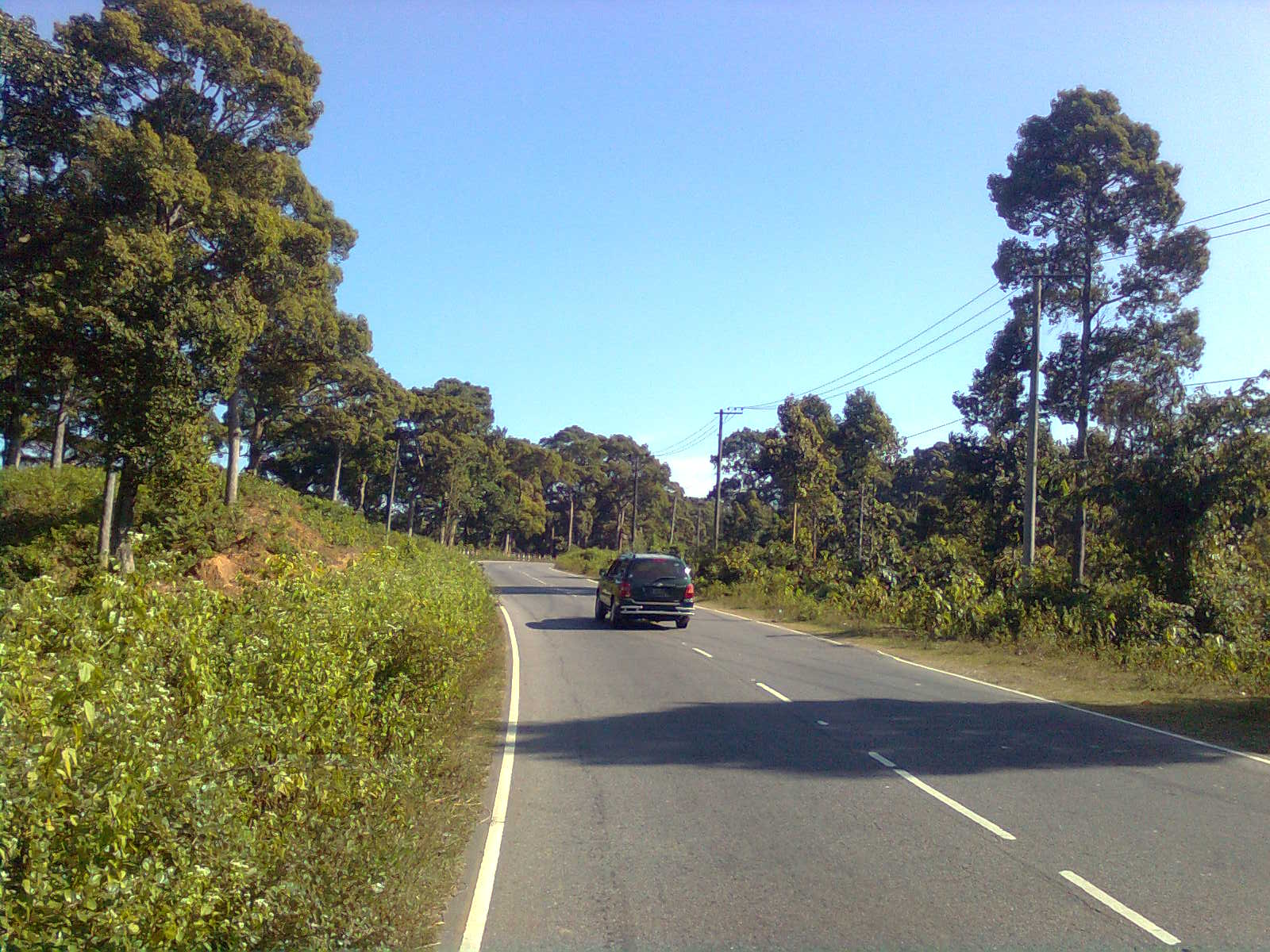
- Road through Chakoria Baniachora forest

- Coordinates: 21°45′45″N 92°04′32″E
- Country: Bangladesh
- Division: Chittagong
- District: Cox's Bazar
- Headquarters: Chakaria

Area
  - Total: 503.83 km^{2} (194.53 sq mi)

Population (2022)
  - Total: 571,280
  - Density: 636/km^{2} (1,650/sq mi)
- Time zone: UTC+6 (BST)
- Postal code: 4740
- Area code: 03422
- Website: https://chakaria.coxsbazar.gov.bd/

Chakaria (Bengali: চকরিয়া) is an upazila of Cox's Bazar District in the Division of Chittagong, Bangladesh.

== Geography ==
Chakoria has 88,391 households and a total area of 503.83 km^{2}. Once there was a mangrove forest named Chakaria Sunderban here. But now it is no more.

== Demographics ==
Religions in Chakaria Upazila (2022)
Religion	Percent
Islam	94.00%
Hinduism	5.03%
Buddhism	0.72%
Other or not stated	0.25%

According to the 2022 Bangladeshi census, Chakaria Upazila had 118,051 households and a population of 571,280. 12.29% of the population were under 5 years of age. Chakaria had a literacy rate (age 7 and over) of 76.38%: 76.80% for males and 75.97% for females, and a sex ratio of 99.10 males for every 100 females. 181,603 (31.79%) lived in urban areas.

As of the 2011 Census of Bangladesh, Chakaria upazila had 88,391 households and a population of 474,465. 134,516 (28.35%) were under 10 years of age. Chakaria had an average literacy rate of 47.61%, compared to the national average of 51.8%, and a sex ratio of 984 females per 1000 males. 72,669 (15.32%) of the population lived in urban areas. Ethnic population is 2,783 (0.59%).

According to the 1991 Bangladesh census, Chakaria had a population of 409, 346. Males constituted 51.87% of the population, and females 48.13%.

== Chakaria Town ==
Chakaria Town has an area of 2.95 km^{2}. It has a population of 50716; male 52.64%, female 47.36%. The literacy rate among town people is 34.5%. It has three dak bungalows.

== Administration ==
Chakaria thana was constituted in 1793 and was turned into an upazila in 1983.

Chakaria Upazila is divided into Chakaria Municipality and 18 union parishads: Badarkhali, Baraitali, Bheola Manikchar, Bamo Bilchari, Chiringa, Demusia, Dulahazara, Fashiakhali, Harbang, Kaiarbil, Kakhara, Khuntakhali, Konakhali, Lakhyarchar, Paschim Bara Bheola, Purba Bara Bheola, Saharbil, and Surajpur-Manikpur. The union parishads are subdivided into 48 mauzas and 212 villages.

Chakaria Bazar Municipality is subdivided into 9 wards and 23 mahallas.

== Archaeological heritage ==
Tomb of Shah Umar, Sat-gumbad Masjid of Fazl Quke at Manikpur (1873), Hasher Dighi, Bir Kamla Dighi, Dolhazara Safari Park, Chawarfari Mangrove Forest.

== Historical events ==
During the war of liberation in 1971, the Pak army killed 13 villagers by gunshot and burnt more than one hundred houses and shops in different places of the upazila.

== Marks of War of Liberation ==
Shaheed Abdul Hamid memorial monument.

== Religious institutions ==
Mosque 500, temple 99, church 3, pagoda 16, mazar 6.

== Old institutions ==
Educational institutions in the Upazila include:

- Manikpur Burmese Government Primary School (1828)
- Harbang Government Primary School (1884)
- Kaharia Ghona Government Primary School (1914)
- Pekua Government Primary School (1918)
- Saharbil Anwarul Ulum Senior Madrasa (1918)
- Chakaria Government High School (1930)
- Illishia Jamila Begum High School (1945)
- Chakaria Government Girls' High School (1968)
- Chakoria pre cadet grammar School (1998)
- Quality Computer Chakaria (2000)
- Computer Tech-IT Solution Malumghat (2016)
- Chakaria Korak Biddayapith (1990)
- Chakaria Cambrian School (2011)
- চিরিংগা ইসলামিয়া এমদাদুল উলুম মুহিউচ্ছুন্নাহ মাদ্রাসা (1975)
- মারকাজুস সুন্নাহ চকরিয়া। (2018)
- Chakaria Central high school (1972)
- Memorial Christian High School (1975)
- Turas Travels and Tourism (2022)
- Palakata High School (1970)

== Media ==
Weekly Chakori, fortnightly Mehdi.

== Cultural organizations ==
52, literary organization 3, women's organization 22, theatre party 2, playground 50.

Main Exports Shrimp, salt, tobacco, groundnut, mustard seed, flour, watermelon, timber, coastal Fish.

== Notable people ==
- Khan Bahadur Maulvi Jalaluddin Ahmad (1890–1958, Harbang Zamindar Bari), lawyer and former health minister of Bengal
- Siddique Ahmad (1903–1987, Baraitali), Islamic scholar, political leader and professor
- Fazlul Karim (1905–1986, Harbang Shiqdar Bari), lawyer and first mayor of Cox's Bazar
- AKM Shahidullah Saber (1930–1971, Harbang), journalist
- Mohammad Ziauddin Ahmed (1939–2025, Paharchanda), Commanding Officer of 1st East Bengal Regiment and 2nd Brigade Commander of 46 Brigade
- Saleha Khanam (1942–2025, Dhemushia), former member of parliament
- Jafar Alam (born 1957, Palakata Saudagar Bari), historian and former member of parliament
- Salahuddin Ahmed (born 1962, Sikdar Para Maulvi Bari), Minister of Home Affairs
- Mohammed Ellias (born 1963), former member of parliament
- Aung Rakhine (born 1985, Harbang Rakhine Bari), filmmaker
- A. H. Salahuddin Mahmud (born Baraitali), freedom fighter and former member of parliament
- Enamul Haq Manju (born Chiringa), professor and former member of parliament
- Hasina Ahmed, former member of parliament

== See also ==
- Upazilas of Bangladesh
- Districts of Bangladesh
- Divisions of Bangladesh
