= Bangladesh Kalyan Party =

Political party in Bangladesh

Bangladesh Kallyan Party বাংলাদেশ কল্যাণ পার্টি Bangladesh Welfare Party
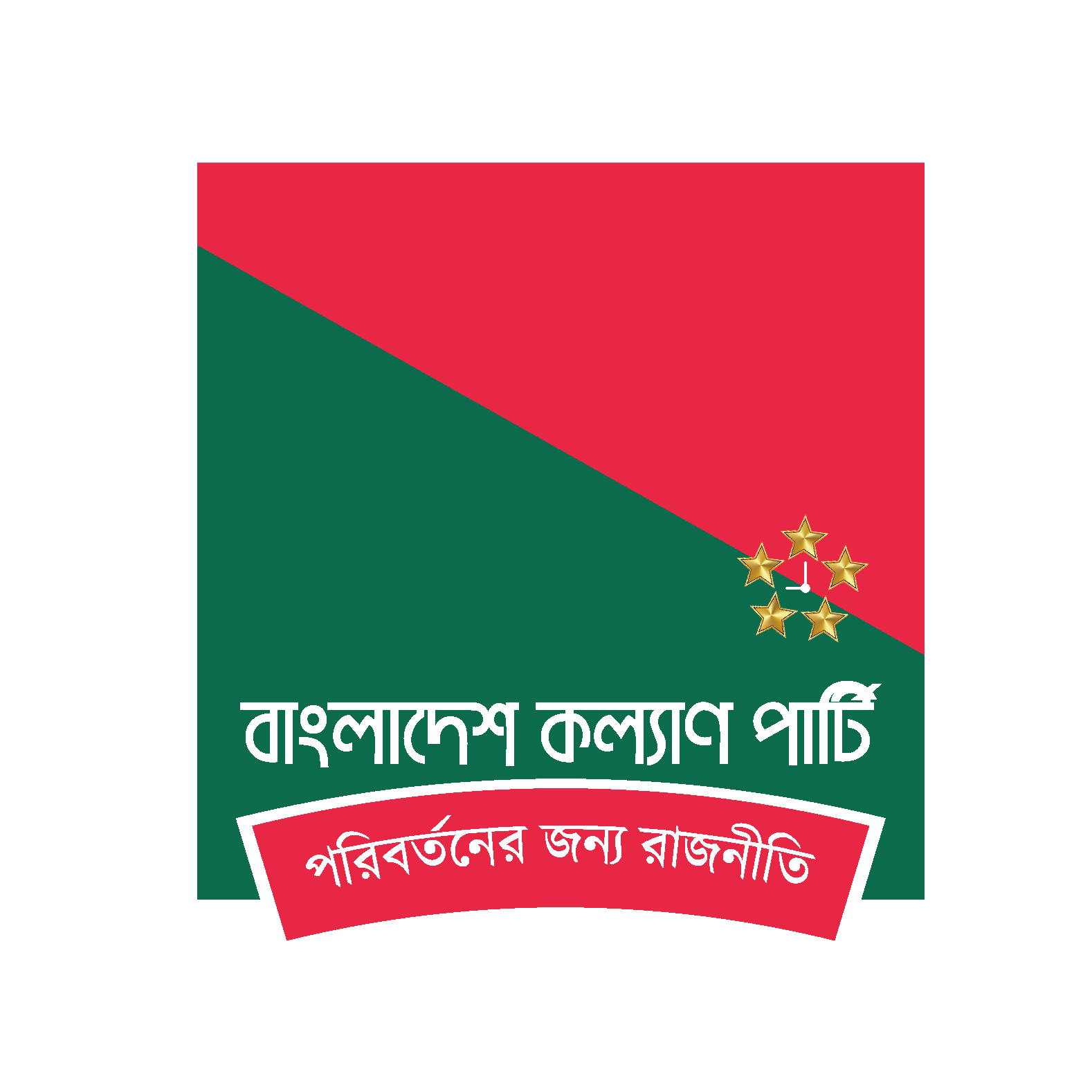
- Abbreviation: BKP
- Chairperson: Syed Muhammad Ibrahim, Bir Protik
- Secretary-General: Md Forhad Meia
- Governing body: National Executive Committee
- Standing Committee: National Standing Committee
- Founder: Syed Muhammad Ibrahim
- Founded: 4 December 2007
- Registered: 031 (17 November 2008)
- Headquarters: House 325, Lane 22, New DOHS, Mohakhali, Dhaka-1206
- Student wing: Bangladesh Chhatra Kallyan Party
- Youth wing: Bangladesh Jubo Kallyan Party
- Women's wing: Bangladesh Mahila Kallyan Party
- Ideology: Bangladeshi nationalism Islamic democracy Economic liberalism
- Political position: Centre Right
- National affiliation: 20 Party Alliance (2012-2022); 12-Party Alliance (2022-2023); United Front 2023
- Colors: Red and Green
- Slogan: "Poribortoner Jonno Rajniti" (Bengali) "Politics for Change"
- Bangladesh Parliament: 0 / 350

Election symbol
- Wrist Watch

Party flag
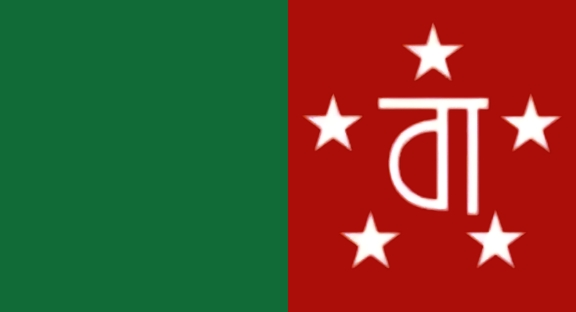

Website
- Bangladesh Kallyan Party

The Bangladesh Kalyan Party (Bengali: বাংলাদেশ কল্যাণ পার্টি, lit. 'Bangladesh Welfare Party') is a registered political party of Bangladesh founded by General Syed Muhammad Ibrahim Bir Pratik. He is currently serving as the chairman and Md Forhad Meia is serving as Secretary General of the party.

== History ==
During the 2006–2008 Bangladeshi political crisis, Syed Muhammad Ibrahim founded a new political party named Bangladesh Kalyan Party in December 2007. In 2008, the party joined Jatiya Oikya Front (National United Front) led by Kamal Hossain. Syed Muhammad Ibrahim was re-elected as party chairman on 5 December 2015. The party was a member of the 20 Party Alliance led by the Bangladesh Nationalist Party. In 2023, Juktofront made its debut as a new alliance under the leadership of Bangladesh Kalyan Party. The alliance includes Bangladesh Jatiya Party, Bangladesh Muslim League (BML) and Bangladesh Kalyan Party. In 2024, Kalyan Party decided to contest in the 2024 Bangladeshi general election. They came out of the 20 Party Alliance to participate in the election and made a new coalition named Juktofront with 3 political parties. This new coalition was formed to protest against the government. The coalition contested in 38 seats where Kalyan Party contested in 20 seats. Kalyan Party won 1 seat in the election in Cox's Bazar-1 where the party chairman Syed Muhammad Ibrahim elected as member of 12th Jatiya Sangsad by defeating the incumbent member Jafar Alam.

== Election results ==
=== Jatiya Sangsad elections ===
Election	Party leader	Votes	%	Seats	+/–	Position	Government
2008	Syed Muhammad Ibrahim	21,609	0.03%	0 / 300	New	▲23th	Opposition
2014	Did not contest						
2018	Syed Muhammad Ibrahim	44,436	0.05%	0 / 300	0	▲19th	Opposition
2024	Syed Muhammad Ibrahim	87,868	0.25%	1 / 300	▲1	▲3th	Opposition
