= Badarkhali Union =

Badarkhali Bengali: বদরখালী
- Interactive map of Badarkhali
- Coordinates: 22°22′N 91°48′E
- Country: Bangladesh
- Division: Chittagong Division
- District: Cox's Bazar District
- Upazila: Chakaria Upazila

Government
  - Badarkhali UP Chairman: Nur Hossain Arif
  - Badarkhali Samabaya Krishi and Upanibesh Samity Secretary: A K M Iqbal Badary

Area
  - Total: 22 km^{2} (8.5 sq mi)

Population (2011)
  - Total: 40,100
  - Density: 1,800/km^{2} (4,700/sq mi)
- Postal code: 4742
- Calling code: 0341
- Website: badarkhaliup.coxsbazar.gov.bd

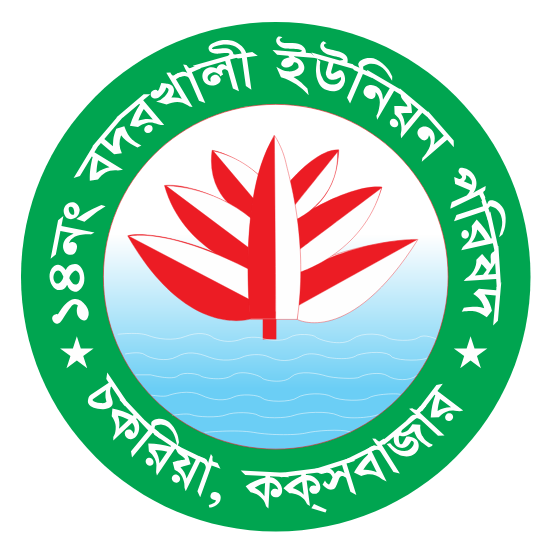
Official logo

Badarkhali (Bengali: বদরখালী) is a village in southeastern Bangladesh and a Union Parishad. Built on the banks of the Moheshkhali Channel, it has a population of over 45,000. It is located 120 km south of Chittagong and in Cox's Bazar District. The modern Badarkhali derives its name from Badar Shah. In 1340, Badar Shah and the twelve Awlias, along with the Sufi general Syed Nasiruddin, defeated King Achak Narayan of Taraf and established Muslim rule there.

== Geography and climate ==
Badarkhali is located at 21.71936°N, 91.94996°E. It has 5,000 household units and a total area of about 9 square kilometres. The main river flowing on Badarkhali is the Moheshkhali channel.

It is surrounded by Dorbeshkhata on the north, and Moheshkhali Channel on the south, east, and west.

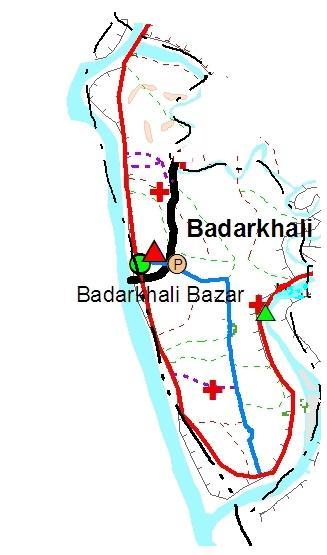
Map of Badarkhali

== Economy ==
Badarakhali Union's economy depends mainly on agriculture and fisheries.

== Administration ==
List of Para

1. Kutubdia Para (Block No.-01)
2. Kutubdia Para (Block No.-02)
3. Azam Nagar
4. Bazar Para
5. Bheruyakhali Para
6. Chanuya Para
7. Chowdhury Para
8. Datinakhali Para
9. Demusiya Para
10. Khalakaca Para
11. Kutubnagar Para
12. Maganama Para
13. Majher Para
14. Natun Ghona
15. Tecchi Para
16. Noya Para
17. Sahariya Para
18. Pukuria Para
19. Oyapada Para
20. Tutiyakhali Para
21. Lambakhali Para
22. Muhuri Para
23. Napitakhali Para
24. Gudham Para
25. Satadaliya Para
26. Matarabari Para

Badarkhali Union Parisad consists of a chairman and twelve members, including three members exclusively reserved for women. Union Parishads are formed under the Local Government (Union Parishads) Act, 2009. The boundary of each union is demarcated by the deputy commissioner of Cox's Bazar District. The Union Council is the body primarily responsible for agricultural, industrial, and community development within the local limits of the union.

List of Chairman

#	Name	Portrait	Entered office	Left office
1	Mokbul Ahmed		1973	1975
2	Abdul Hannan		1976	
3	Nurul Islam Shikdar			
4	M. Hossain Ahmed		1984	1988
5	Nurul Islam Shikdar		1988	1992
6	M. Hossain Ahmed		1992	1996
7	Mohammad Ali		1996	2000
8	Nuruzzaman Shikdar		2001	2004
9	A K M Iqbal Badary		2005	2009
10	Nur Hossain Arif		2011	2016

== Education ==
The education system of Badarkhali is similar to that of Bangladesh.

College

1. Badarkhali Degree College

High school

1. Badarkhali Colonization High School
2. Al Azahar High School
3. Little Jewels Samabaya Pre-Cadet School .

== Gallery ==
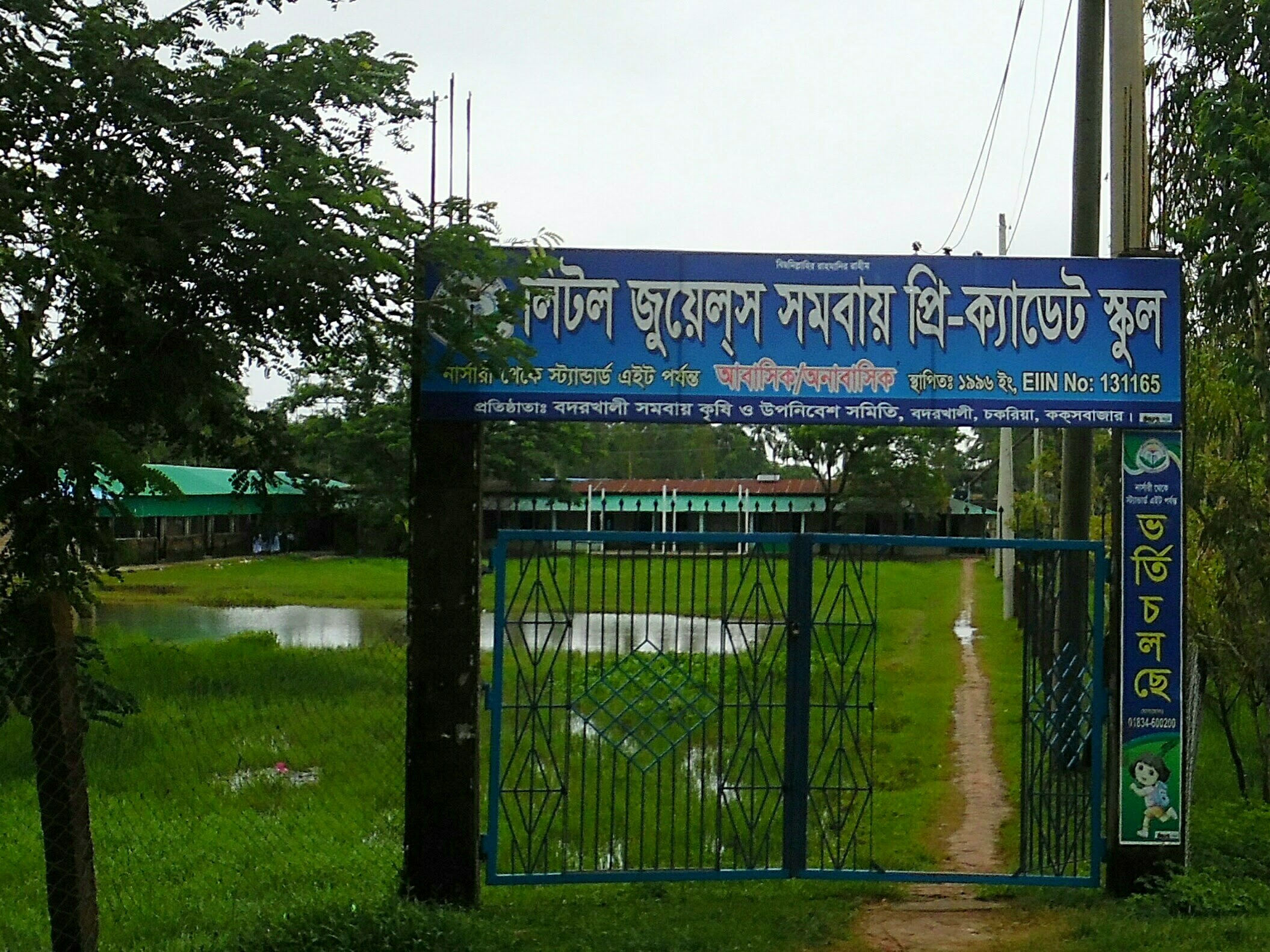
Little Jewels Samabaya Pre-Cadet School, Badarkhali, Chakaria, Cox's Bazar

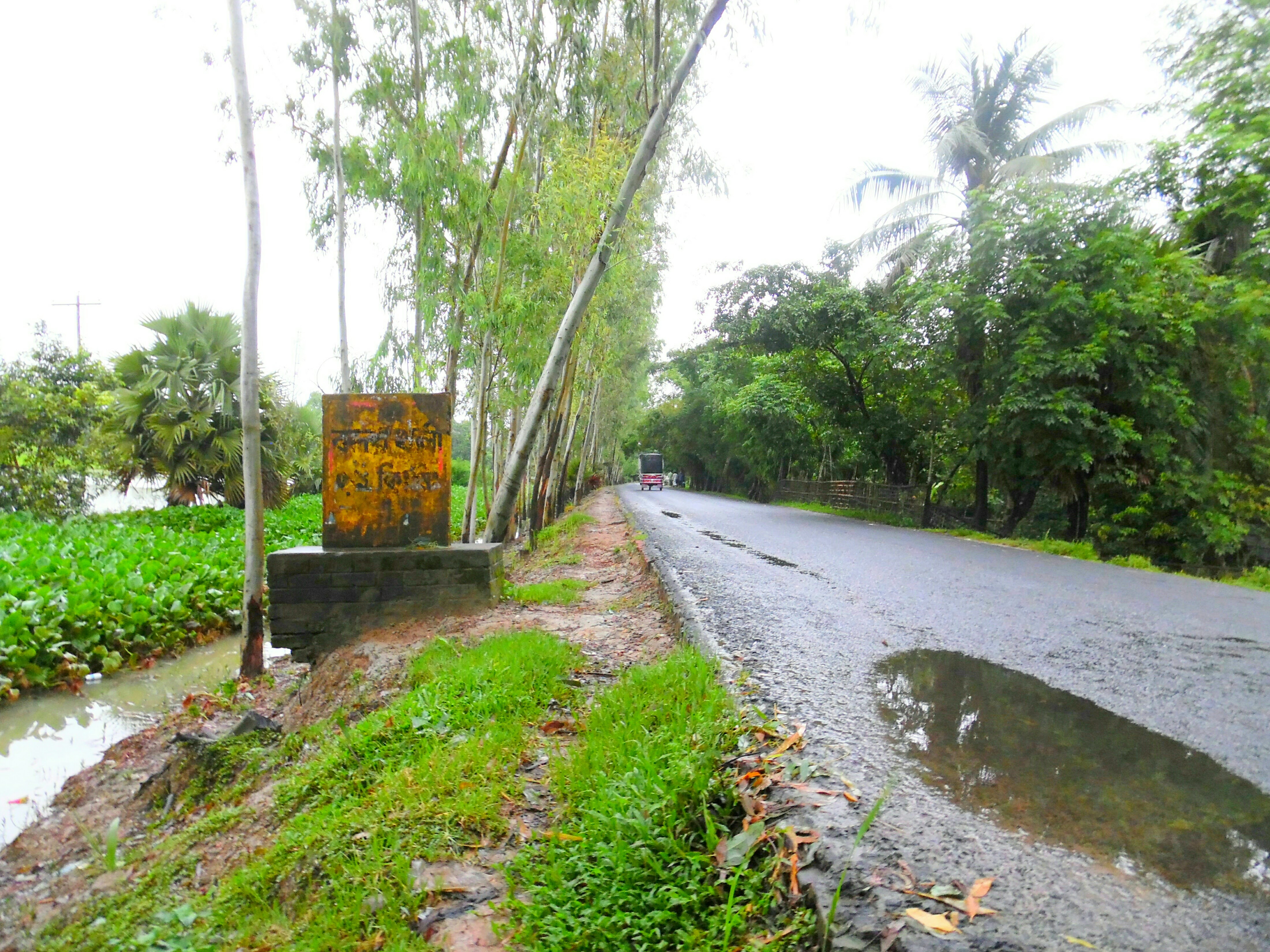
View of a road in Badarkhali, Chakaria, Cox's Bazar .

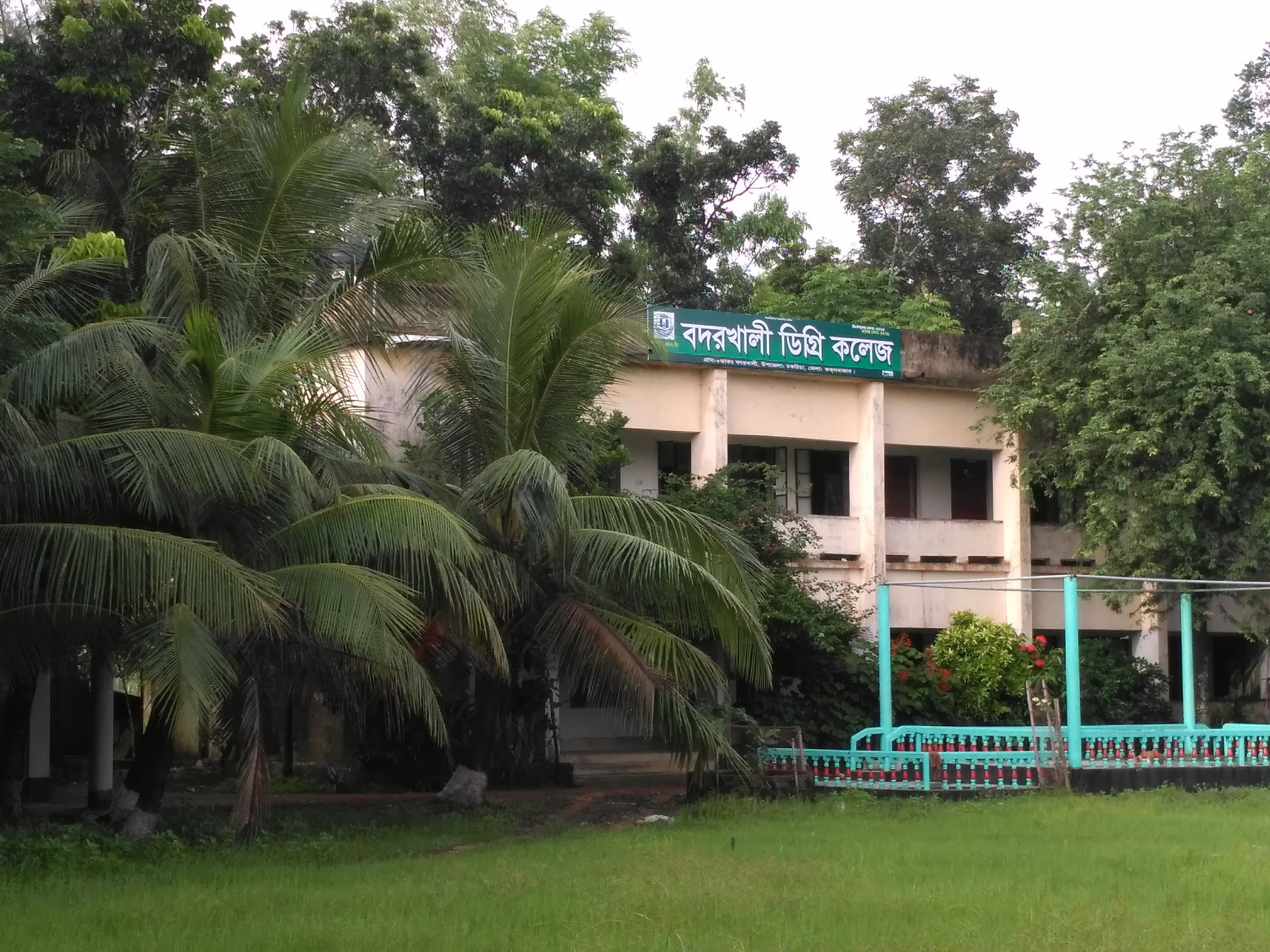
Badarkhali Degree College, Chakaria, Cox's Bazar

== See also ==
- Villages of Bangladesh
- Upazilas of Bangladesh
- Districts of Bangladesh
- Divisions of Bangladesh
