= Fazlul Karim (lawyer) =

Bangladeshi politician and lawyer

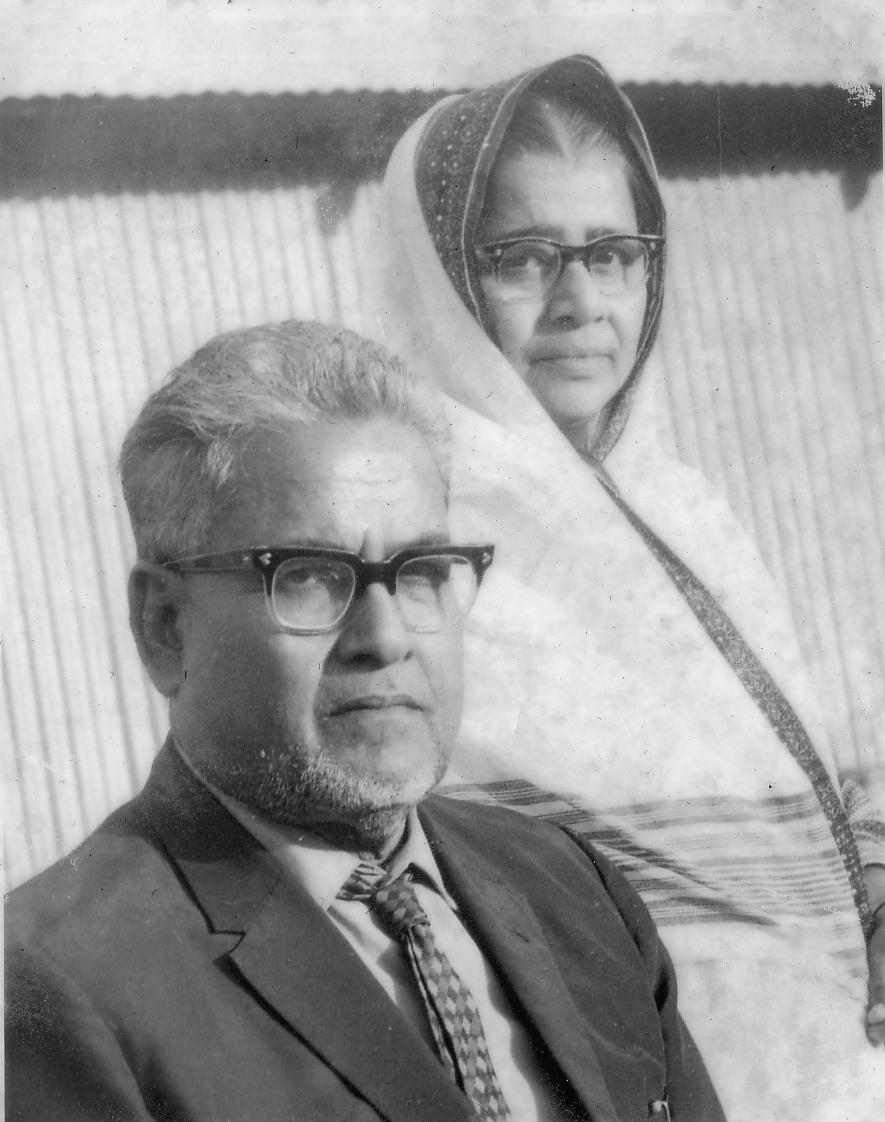
- Advocate Karim with his wife
- Born: Fazlul Karim Hridoy; 14 September 1905; Harbang, Bengal, British India
- Died: 24 May 1986 (aged 80); Chittagong, Bangladesh
- Resting place: Harbang, Chakaria, Cox's Bazar; 21°50′45″N 92°03′32″E
- Education: Chittagong College
- Alma mater: Presidency College Calcutta
- Occupations: Lawyer, politician
- Known for: tourism development in East Pakistan, Municipal Tax Law Development
- Title: Moulvi
- Political party: Muslim League, Independent
- Spouse: Najmunnisa Chowdhurani
- Children: 4
- Relatives: Colonel Dr. M. M. Rahman (Youngest Brother)(Ex-Director Bangladesh Army Medical Corp), Lt Col Mohammad Ziauddin Bir Uttom (nephew),

Fazlul Karim (Bengali: ফজলুল করিম; 14 September 1905 – 24 May 1986) was a Bangladeshi lawyer, businessman, politician and soldier. He was the first mayor of Cox's Bazar.

== Early life ==
Fazlul Karim was born on 14 September 1905 to a Bengali family of Muslim Shiqdars in the village of Harbang in Chakaria thana, Cox's Bazar subdivision, Chittagong District, Eastern Bengal and Assam. He was the eldest among the seven daughters and three sons of village leader Golam Quader Shikdar and housewife Feroza Begum. Karim was educated at the Harbang Union School and later moved to Government Muslim High School in Chittagong, from where he completed his matriculation. He had passed his Intermediate of Arts in science from Chittagong College and completed his B.A. and B.L. from Presidency College Calcutta in 1923 and 1925 respectively.

He started his practice as a lawyer in Calcutta Judges Court as junior lawyer of Barrister Huseyn Shaheed Suhrawardy, who used to appoint him to deal with his civil cases in the lower courts. He found his practice as a junior lawyer so lucrative that he refused to become a Munsif when he was offered a post by the Lieutenant Governor. After completion of his B.A exams he joined the Writers' Building (from 1923 to 1926) as the infamous Police Commissioner Sir Charles Augustus Tegart's Bengali translator; as he was fluent in both Urdu and Bengali, he had to translate news from vernacular newspapers for Sir Tegart and Colonel Simpson's perusal. Neither suspected that he was sympathetic to Netaji Subhas Chandra Bose. Colonel Simpson was killed in a daring attack on Writers' Building by Bengali Militants. Karim was present in that particular room, and the two militants did not harm him. But Sir Tegart managed to escape and mount an assault on the militants, who tried to commit suicide. Karim was also accompanying Tegart on January 12, 1924 during an attempt by Gopinath Saha on Tegart's life, at Chowringhee Road in Calcutta. Later, Karim returned to Cox's Bazar completing his survey course from Savar, Dhaka and started his practice in Cox's Bazar Judges Court. He had much interest in historical legal cases. He observed the entire Bhawal Raja case staying at Dhaka.

== Career ==
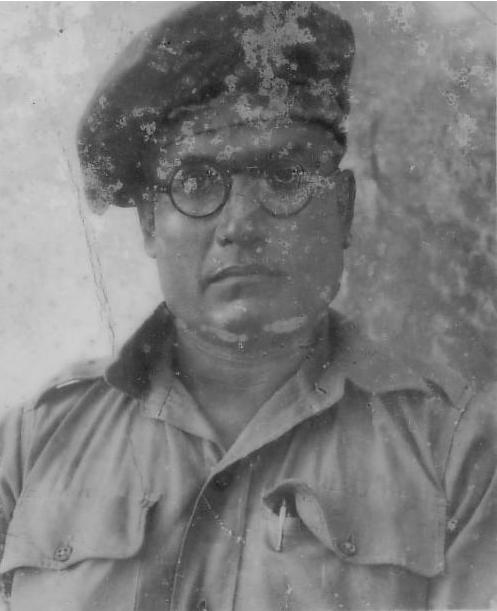
Fazlul Karim in National Guard Uniform

- Pakistan National Guards: Fazlul Karim was appointed in the then 22nd Battalion of Pakistan National Guards as Lieutenant under the command of Major General Ayub Khan and later promoted as Captain. He was the Officer In Charge (OC) of a platoon of 22nd National Guards, which was posted at Cox's Bazar. When the National Guard was converted into the Bangladesh Ansars (then East Pakistan Ansars), he left the job and joined in the political group, the Muslim League.
- Chairman of Cox's Bazar Municipality: Fazlul Karim was elected chairman of Cox's Bazar in 1950 (first after independence from British Raj) from Muslim League and later in 1954 as an independent candidate. He had established the Tamarisk Forest along the beach to draw tourist in this town and also to protect the beach from storm surges. He also donated many of his father in law's and his own lands for establishing a public library and a town hall for the town. He was inspired to make Cox's Bazar to make a tourist spot after seeing beaches of Bombay and Karachi, and one of the pioneers in developing Cox's Bazar as such.

He founded a maternity hospital, the stadium and the drainage system by procuring grants from the Ford Foundation and Rockefeller Foundation through correspondence. Mr. T. H. Mathewman, the principal of the Dacca Engineering College (1951~1954) was his friend who had helped him in doing this. Engineer Chandi Charan Das was the government civil engineer who had worked on all these projects.

- Chief Assessor, Chittagong Municipality: He then joined Chittagong Municipality as Chief Assessor for Taxes and developed the method and calculation for Municipal Taxes for the Municipalities of West and East Pakistan (still maintained in Bangladesh Municipalities).
- Chief Estate Officer, Chittagong Port Authority: He was appointed as Chief Estate Officer of the Chittagong Port Authority in 1966 and was the pioneer in dividing the estates of Railway and Port Authority in East Pakistan.
- Pleader Commissioner, Chittagong Judges Court: After retirement from the Port Authority he served as Pleader Commissioner in the Chittagong Judges Court till the last day of his life. He was famous for his honesty and fair decision for land division in the courts of East Pakistan and Bangladesh.

== Personal life ==
He was the first Muslim graduate in the Cox's Bazar district. At the age of thirty, Fazlul married Nazmunnisa Chowdhurani, elder daughter of Zamindar Akbar Ahmed Chowdhury and granddaughter of Kiwk Zamindar Fazal Karim Chowdhury of Manikpur, Chakaria, Cox's Bazar in 1935. She gave birth to their four sons — Murad B.Z. Karim (an accountant), Brigadier General Khaled A. Karim (Ex-Director Army Signals), Flying Officer Shaheed Waleed Ehsanul Karim, and Zaid N. Karim. He had suffered for sheltering the Bangladesh Mukti Bahini at his home during the Bangladesh Liberation War of 1971. His wife used to supply flags for the Mukti Bahini. On 24 May 1986, Fazlul Karim died at the age of 81 years in his Jamal Khan Road residence at Chittagong. He was buried at the family graveyard at Harbang, Chakaria.
