= A. H. Salahuddin Mahmud =

Bangladeshi politician

- আ হ সালাহউদ্দীন মাহমূদ

Member of Jatiya Sangsad
- In office 7 May 1986 – 27 February 1991
- Preceded by: Mahmudul Karim Chowdhury
- Succeeded by: Enamul Haq Manju

Personal details
- Party: Jatiya Party (Manju)
- Other political affiliations: Jatiya Party (Ershad)

A. H. Salahuddin Mahmud (Bengali: আ হ সালাহউদ্দীন মাহমূদ) is a Bangladeshi politician. He was a former member of the Jatiya Sangsad representing the Cox's Bazar-1 constituency as a Jatiya Party (Ershad) politician.

== Early life and family ==
A. H. Salahuddin Mahmud was born in Baraitali in Chakaria, Cox's Bazar subdivision, Chittagong district. He belonged to the family of Deputy Magistrate Ghulam Qadir.

== Career ==
Mahmud was a former central vice-president of the Bangladesh Chhatra League. During the Bangladesh Liberation War of 1971, he served as a BLF commander in Cox's Bazar subdivision. Mahmud served as the first chairman of the Chakaria Upazila Council. He joined the Jatiya Party (Ershad) in 1986, and was elected to parliament from Cox's Bazar-1 as a Jatiya Party candidate in the same year.

He was re-elected at the 1988 Bangladeshi general election for a second term. Upon the creation of the nationwide District Council Chairman positions, he was appointed as the first chairman of the Cox's Bazar District Council. Presently, he is a presidium member of the Jatiya Party (Manju).
