= Dulahazara Union =

Dulahazara Union ডুলাহাজারা ইউনিয়ন
- Union Councils of Bangladesh
- Location of Dulahazara in Bangladesh
- Coordinates: 21°41′N 92°5′E
- Country: Bangladesh
- Division: Chittagong Division
- District: Cox's Bazar District
- Upazila: Chakaria Upazila

Government
  - Union Council Chairman: Riyaz Uddin Shipu

Area
  - Total: 39.6 km^{2} (15.3 sq mi)

Population (2011)
  - Total: 42,904
- Time zone: UTC+6 (BST)
- Postal Code: 4741
- Website: http://dulahazaraup.coxsbazar.gov.bd/

Dulahazara Union (Bengali: ডুলাহাজারা ইউনিয়ন) is a union, the smallest administrative body of Bangladesh, located in Chakaria Upazila, Cox's Bazar District, Bangladesh The total population was 42,904 in 2011.

== Notable people ==
- Anisur Rahman Zico, footballer
