= Chakaria =

Chakaria চকরিয়া
- Town and Municipality
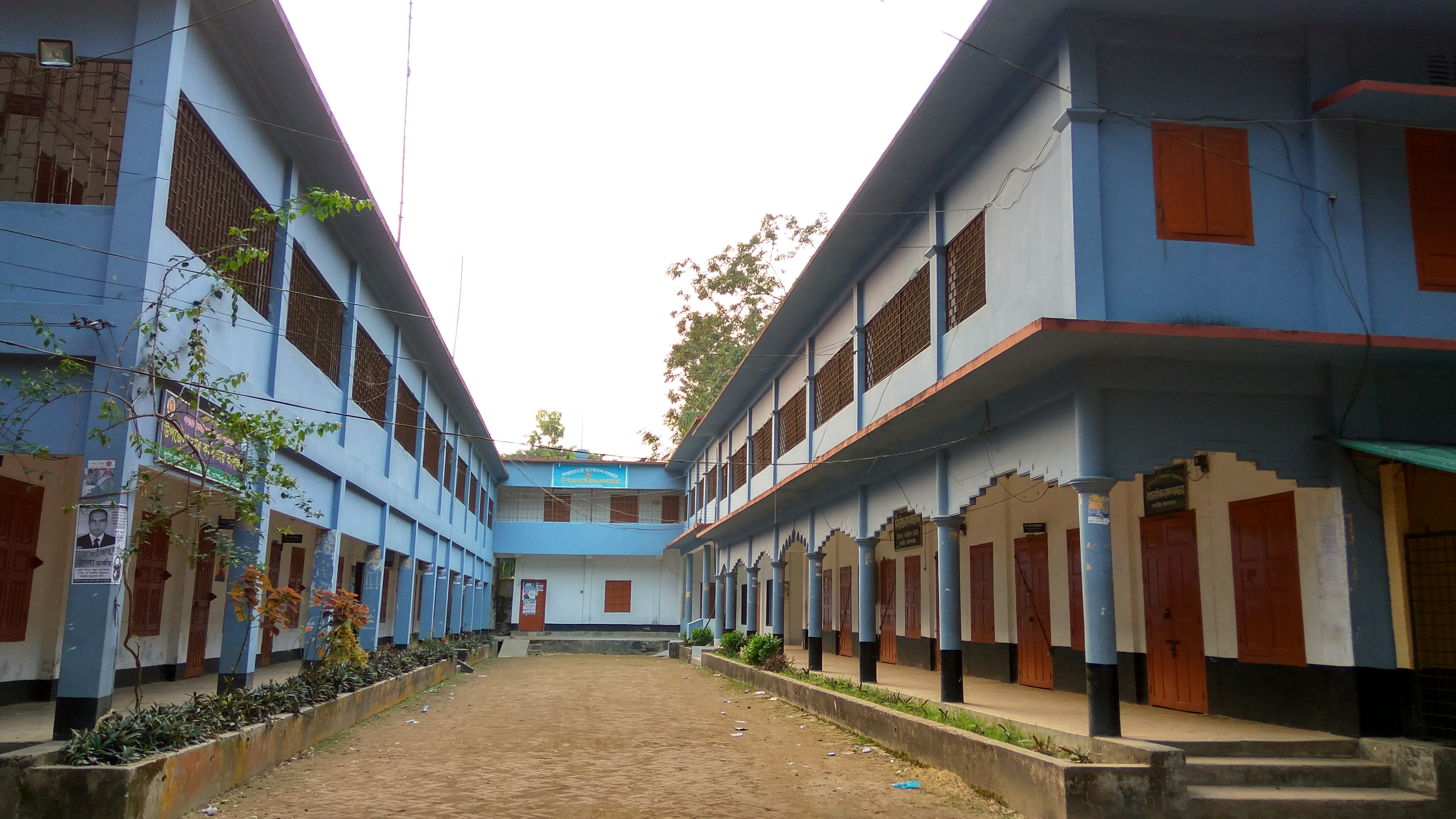
- Chakaria Upazila Parishad

- Location of Chakaria town in Chittagong division Location of Chakaria town in Bangladesh
- Coordinates: 21.764°N 92.076°E
- Country: Bangladesh
- Division: Chittagong
- District: Cox's Bazar
- Upazila: Chakaria

Government
  - Type: Municipality
  - Body: Chakaria Municipality
  - Paura Mayor: Alamgir Chowdhury

Area
  - Total: 15.76 km^{2} (6.08 sq mi)

Population (2022)
  - Total: 94,397
  - Density: 5,990/km^{2} (15,510/sq mi)
- Time zone: UTC+6 (BST)
- National calling code: +880

Chakaria is a town in southeastern Bangladesh. It is the headquarters of Chakaria Upazila in Cox's Bazar District. It is situated on the Matamuhuri River.

== Demographics ==
Religions in Chakaria (2011)
Religion	Percent
Islam	90.67%
Hinduism	7.93%
Buddhism	1.38%
Other or not stated	0.02%

According to the 2022 Bangladesh census, Chakaria city had a population of 94,397 and a literacy rate of 84.06%.

According to the 2011 Bangladesh census, Chakaria city had 13,163 households and a population of 72,669. 19,399 (26.70%) were under 10 years of age. Chakaria had a literacy rate (age 7 and over) of 61.25%, compared to the national average of 51.8%, and a sex ratio of 947 females per 1000 males. Ethnic population was 837 (1.15%).
