= Syed Muhammad Ibrahim =

Bangladeshi politician

Syed Muhammad Ibrahim BP
- সৈয়দ মুহাম্মদ ইবরাহিম
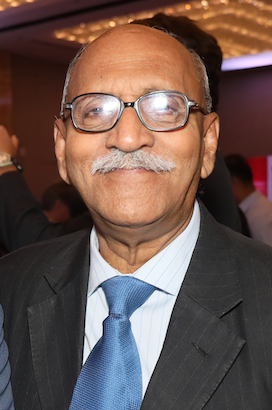
- Ibrahim in 2023

Member of Parliament
- In office 10 January 2024 – 6 August 2024
- Preceded by: Jafar Alam
- Succeeded by: Salahuddin Ahmed
- Constituency: Cox's Bazar-1

Personal details
- Born: 4 October 1949 (age 76) Hathazari, East Bengal, Pakistan
- Party: Bangladesh Kalyan Party
- Education: Faujdarhat Cadet college Pakistan Military Academy; University of Dhaka
- Profession: Military officer, politician
- Awards: Bir Protik; Sword of Honour (PMA)

Military service
- Allegiance: Pakistan (before 1971); Bangladesh
- Branch/service: Pakistan Army; Bangladesh Army
- Years of service: 1970–2003
- Rank: Major General
- Unit: East Bengal Regiment
- Commands: GOC of 55th Infantry Division; Commandant of Bangladesh Military Academy; Commander of 46th Independent Infantry Brigade; Commander of 21st Infantry Brigade; Commander of 203rd Infantry Brigade
- Battles/wars: Bangladesh Liberation War

Syed Muhammad Ibrahim is a Bangladeshi politician and retired major general of the Bangladesh Army. He briefly served as a member of the Jatiya Sangsad representing the Cox's Bazar-1 constituency. He is the founder of the Bangladesh Kalyan Party. He was awarded the Bir Protik, the fourth-highest gallantry award for military personnel in Bangladesh, for his bravery during the Bangladesh Liberation War.

== Career ==
Ibrahim joined the Pakistan Military Academy in January 1970, and he was the fourth Bengali who was awarded the highest gallantry award, the sword of honour. He was commissioned in the East Bengal Regiment of the Pakistan Army's Infantry Corps. He has assessed the top cadet of his class while being commissioned, in September 1970. As an officer of the 2nd East Bengal Regiment, he joined the Bangladesh Liberation War and fought for the entire period from 26 March 1971 to 16 December 1971. He was decorated with the gallantry award Bir Protik. Following the 2005 bombing by Jammatul Mujahideen Bangladesh, he was consulted by Bangladesh Nationalist Party government minister Amir Khasru Mahmud Chowdhury. He gave the opinion that JMB was not strong and the bombings were retaliation against the government.

Later Ibrahim became the chairman of a non-political voluntary organization called the Moulana Bhasani Foundation. In December 2007 during the 2006–08 Bangladeshi political crisis, he founded a new political party named the "Bangladesh Kalyan Party". His party joined the National United Front in 2008 led by Kamal Hossain. He was re-elected chairman of the party on 5 December 2015. His party is a member of the 20 Party Alliance led by the Bangladesh Nationalist Party. On 16 December 2015, he was prevented by the Special Security Forces from entering Bangabhaban, the presidential palace, for Victory Day celebrations because his name was on an exclusionary list. This was the first time since 1980 that he was not allowed to enter the celebrations at the presidential palace.

Ibrahim is a writer and speaker. He writes irregular but frequent columns for the major newspapers of Dhaka and the weekly magazine PROBE. His party secretary, MM Aminur Rahman, disappeared on 27 August 2017 from Dhaka.

Ibrahim was elected to parliament on 7 January 2024 as a candidate of the Bangladesh Kalyan Party. He received 81,955 votes while his nearest rival, Jafar Alam, received 52,896 votes. Jafar Alam accused the vote was rigged in favor of Ibrahim by the Border Guards Bangladesh and an intelligence agency.

The Bangladesh Kalyan Party expelled Ibrahim in September 2025 for participating in the 12th parliamentary election.
