= Harbang Union =

Coordinates: 21°50′45″N 92°03′00″E

Harbang (Bengali: হারবাঙ্গ) is a village and union parishad in Chakaria Upazila, Cox's Bazar District in the Chittagong Division in Bangladesh.

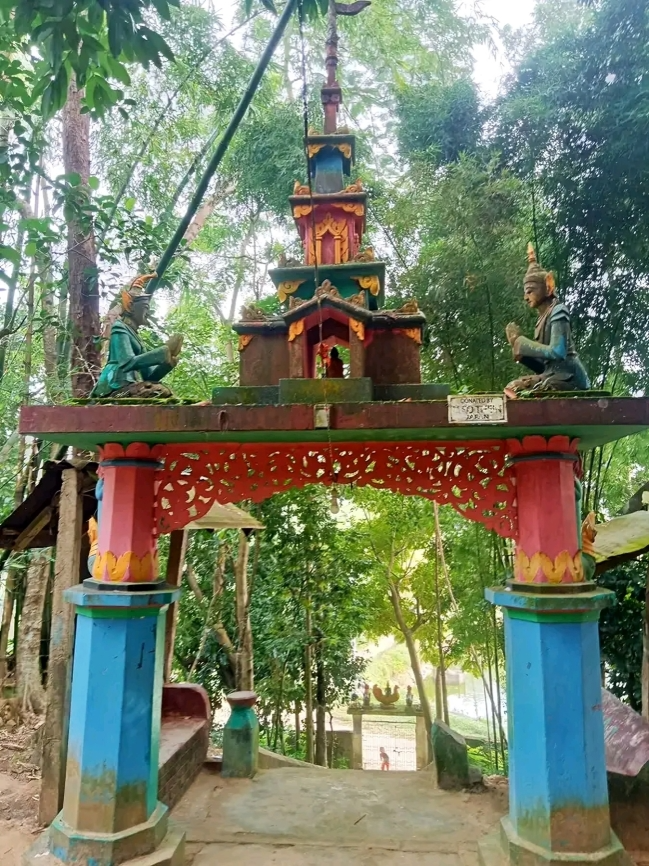
Rakhine Buddha Mondir in Harbang

== Notable residents ==
- Fazlul Karim, Bangladeshi lawyer
- Khan Bahadur Jalal Uddin Ahmad, eminent lawyer, social worker and Health Minister of Bengal in undivided India
- Mohammad Ziauddin, Military Officer, Freedom Fighter, Ex Charman Chittagong Development Authority
- Aung Rakhine, Bangladeshi filmmaker
