= Floating Schools =

Mobile educational boats in flood-prone Bangladesh

Location
- Chalan Beel, Natore District; Natore; Bangladesh

Information
- School type: NGO, Floating mobile school
- Motto: Providing education, information, and sustainable livelihoods to flood-prone communities
- Established: 2002
- Founder: Mohammed Rezwan
- Status: Active
- Oversight: Shidhulai Swanirvar Sangstha
- Executive Director: Mohammed Rezwan
- Grades: Primary and lower secondary
- Enrollment: Approximately 100,000 students served since 2002
- Language: Bengali
- Classrooms: 100+ solar-powered boats
- Campus type: Floating (boat-based)
- Colors: Blue and white
- Affiliations: BRAC, UNDP, UNFCCC
- Website: www.shidhulai.org

Floating Schools in Bangladesh are mobile educational boats designed to provide access to schooling in flood-prone, riverine and haor regions of the country. These floating classrooms operate on boats or pontoons equipped with solar power, internet facilities, and educational resources. They offer formal and non-formal education to children who are unable to attend conventional schools due to seasonal or permanent flooding.

== History ==
In Bangladesh’s flood-prone delta regions, where seasonal monsoons regularly cut off access to schools, communities have turned to a creative fix, floating classrooms. These boat schools sail directly to villages surrounded by water, letting children continue their studies even when the land is submerged.

The floating school model emerged in the early 2000s as a community-led response to chronic flooding and isolation in low-lying rural areas. The first major initiative was launched by the NGO Shidhulai Swanirvar Sangstha in 2002, led by architect and social entrepreneur Mohammed Rezwan. The organisation built boats that served as both school buses and classrooms, allowing teachers to reach children even during monsoon floods. Each vessel carried solar panels, computers, books and educational materials.

Inspired by Shidhulai’s success, other organisations, including BRAC, adopted the model. By the 2010s, hundreds of boat schools were operating across haor and islands, reaching thousands of children annually.

== Model and operation ==
A typical floating school consists of a boat hull converted into a classroom with benches, desks and a small library; solar panels and batteries to power lighting, fans and computers; one teacher and local assistants trained in national curriculum delivery; portable communication and learning devices for digital literacy programmes. Boats follow scheduled routes, collecting students from riverside villages and conducting classes while docked or en route. When floodwaters recede, the same boats may function as mobile libraries, adult training centres, or health awareness units.

Shidhulai Swanirvar Sangstha operates a fleet of solar-powered boats providing education, library and vocational services to more than 100,000 people across the Chalan Beel wetlands and adjoining districts. The model has been documented by the United Nations and several development organisations as an example of climate-resilient innovation. BRAC’s boat school programme focuses on children from remote haor regions such as Kishoreganj, Sunamganj and Netrokona. In 2017, BRAC reported more than 500 floating schools in operation.

== Impact ==
Independent reports find that floating schools have reduced dropout rates and increased attendance in remote flood-affected communities. Students often continue their studies at land-based secondary institutions after completing primary education aboard the boats.

The boats also function as information centres offering literacy for adults, training on sustainable farming, and access to solar-powered communication technologies. Academic researchers have identified the model as a notable case of social innovation that combines education, renewable energy and adaptation to climate change.

== Recognition ==
Shidhulai’s solar-powered schoolboats won the Equator Prize in 2006 and were featured by the United Nations Framework Convention on Climate Change (UNFCCC) in its Momentum for Change campaign. In 2014, founder Mohammed Rezwan was named a Yale World Fellow for his contributions to climate-resilient education.

The floating school model has been recognised in Bangladesh’s National Adaptation Plan and in international climate adaptation literature as a replicable approach for education access in flood-affected regions. It has inspired similar community-led initiatives in parts of India, the Philippines and Cambodia.
