= Jafar Alam =

Bangladeshi politician

- জাফর আলম

Member of Parliament for Cox's Bazar-1
- In office 2015–2024
- Preceded by: Hasina Ahmed
- Succeeded by: Syed Muhammad Ibrahim

Personal details
- Born: June 12, 1957 (age 68) Chakaria, Cox's Bazar
- Political party: Bangladesh Awami League
- Education: M.A, B.A (Hons)
- Occupation: Business

Jafar Alam is a Bangladeshi politician and a former member of the Bangladesh Parliament from Cox's Bazar-1.

== Career ==
Alam was elected to parliament from Cox's Bazar-1 as a Bangladesh Awami League candidate on 30 December 2018. He was elected after Hasina Ahmed on that seat at 11th parliament.

Alam is a Bangladeshi politician affiliated with the Bangladesh Awami League and, as of September 2024, serves as the President of the Bangladesh Awami League, Chakaria Upazila.

Alam’s political career began to gain prominence when he was elected as the Mayor of Chakaria Municipality in 2005. In 2014, Alam was elected as the Upazila Chairman of Chakaria Upazila.

During his tenure, he focused on local development projects, infrastructure improvements, and education initiatives, which contributed to his increasing popularity in the region.

On 20 December 2023, Alam was suspended from the Awami League for violating organizational discipline. According to the suspension notice, Alam, who was serving as the President of the Chakaria Upazila unit, was removed from his position for making disrespectful remarks about Prime Minister Sheikh Hasina, which the party deemed a breach of its organizational discipline.

Having failed to get the Awami League's nomination for the 2024 Bangladeshi general election, Alam ran unsuccessfully as an independent candidate. He was arrested in April 2025 after the fall of the Sheikh Hasina led Awami League government by the Detective Branch in Dhaka. He was sent to jail over the murder of Bangladesh Jatiotabadi Jubodal leader Shamim Mollah in 2023 in Dhaka.
