= Jalaluddin Ahmad =

Khan Bahadur Maulvi Jalaluddin Ahmad
- জালালুদ্দীন আহমদ

Member of the Bengal Legislative Assembly
- In office 1937–1945
- Succeeded by: Husne Ara Khan & Bazme Ara Begum
- Constituency: Cox's Bazar

Personal details
- Born: 1890 Harbang, Cox's Bazar subdivision, Chittagong District, Bengal Presidency
- Died: 1958 (aged 67–68) Dacca, East Bengal, Pakistan
- Resting place: Azimpur Graveyard, Dhaka, Bangladesh
- Party: Krishak Praja Party
- Occupation: Landlord, lawyer, politician

Khan Bahadur Maulvi Jalaluddin Ahmad (Bengali: জালালুদ্দীন আহমদ; 1890 – 1958) was a Bengali landlord, lawyer, jurist and politician. He was the former health minister of Bengal.

== Early life and family ==
Ahmad was born in 1890 to a Bengali zamindar family in the village of Harbang in Cox's Bazar subdivision, Chittagong District, Bengal Presidency.

== Career ==
Ahmad was a prominent lawyer in the Chittagong district. He was known for his guiding principles and honesty. Ahmad could speak several languages proficiently including Bengali, Arabic, Urdu and Persian. He was awarded the title of Khan Bahadur by the British administration for his years of service to the community and for being a prominent landlord. Khan Bahadur Maulvi Jalal Uddin Ahmad Chowdhury entered active politics in the mid-1930s. He initially contested the 1937 Bengal elections as an independent candidate. Subsequently, with the support of as a Krishak Praja Party candidate, and he defeated the All-India Muslim League candidate, Mohammad Abdur Rashid Siddiqui, and was elected to the Bengal Legislative Assembly and He remained a member of the Bengal Legislative Assembly. from 1937 to 1946. However, the principal identity of his political career was that of a veteran politician associated with the Muslim League.When A. K. Fazlul Huq rejoined the Muslim League, Jalal Uddin Ahmad Chowdhury also returned to the party. He subsequently served as a member of the Executive Committee and the Parliamentary Board of the Muslim League in undivided Bengal. Following the fall of the Huq–Shyama Coalition Ministry, he served as Minister for Public Health and Local Self-Government of Bengal under the Khwaja Nazim Uddin cabintet. In his later years as well, he remained actively associated with Muslim League politics.

== Personal life ==
He was married to Nafisa Khatun and with her had two daughters, Husna Ara Khan and Bazme Ara Begum. Ahmed's grandson Abdul Muqtadir Khan (Babu) was the chairman of GEC (General Electric Company) Bangladesh and a chartered accountant from England and Wales. One of his other grandsons, A.M. Khan (Rokon) was a pharmacist, business man and social personality.

Among the great-grandsons, Mr. Khaled Ahamed Nur serves as the Chairman of Dhrubo Group, while Mr. Ahsanul Kabir, a Chartered Forensic Accountant and Chartered Management Consultant, is the Managing Director of Time Group (https://www.timenetworksltd.com/), Ms. Fareha Begum, serving as the Country Director of PFEC Global

== Death ==
He died in 1958 in Dacca, East Bengal and is buried at the Azimpur Graveyard.
