= Hasina Ahmed =

Bangladeshi politician

- হাসিনা আহমেদ

Member of Parliament
- In office 29 December 2008 – 9 January 2014
- Preceded by: Salahuddin Ahmed
- Succeeded by: Mohammed Ellias
- Constituency: Cox's Bazar-1

Personal details
- Born: Cox's Bazar, Bangladesh
- Party: Bangladesh Nationalist Party
- Spouse: Salahuddin Ahmed
- Children: Ibrahim; Parmiss; Yousuf; Fariba

Hasina Ahmed is a Bangladesh Nationalist Party (BNP) politician and a former Jatiya Sangsad member from the Cox's Bazar-1 constituency.

== Career ==
Ahmed was elected to parliament from Cox's Bazar-1 in 2008 as a BNP nominee.

== Personal life ==
Hasina is married to Minister of Home Affairs, MP Salahuddin Ahmed and Member of Bangladesh Nationalist Party National Standing Committee's Member, and the couple have four children: Sayeed Ibrahim Ahmed Ibrahim Ahmed, Parmiss Ahmed Ikra, Sayeed Yousuf Ahmed, and Fariba Ahmed Raida.
