= Mohammed Ellias =

Bangladeshi politician

Member of Parliament
- In office 2014–2018
- Constituency: Cox's Bazar-1

Personal details
- Born: 18 October 1963 (age 62)
- Party: Jatiya Party

Mohammed Ellias (Bengali: মোহাম্মদ ইলিয়াছ) is a Bangladeshi politician and the incumbent Member of Bangladesh Parliament from Cox's Bazar-1.

== Early life ==
Ellias was born on 18 October 1963. He completed his education in a Madrassah.

== Career ==
Ellias was elected to Parliament from Cox's Bazar-1 as a Jatiya Party candidate in 2014.
