= Enamul Haq Manju =

Bangladeshi politician

Member of Bangladesh Parliament
- In office 1991–1996
- Preceded by: A. H. Salahuddin Mahmud
- Succeeded by: Salahuddin Ahmed

President of Bangladesh Islami Chhatra Shibir
- In office 1982–1982
- Preceded by: Maulana Muhammad Abu Taher
- Succeeded by: Muhammad Saiful Alam Khan Milon

Personal details
- Political party: Bangladesh Jamaat-e-Islami

Enamul Haq Manju (Bengali: এনামুল হক মঞ্জু) is a Bangladesh Jamaat-e-Islami politician and a former member of parliament for Cox's Bazar-1.

== Career ==
Enamul Haque Manju was a professor when he was elected to parliament from Cox's Bazar-1 as a Bangladesh Jamaat-e-Islami candidate in 1991.
