= Pekua Upazila =

Pekua পেকুয়া
- Upazila
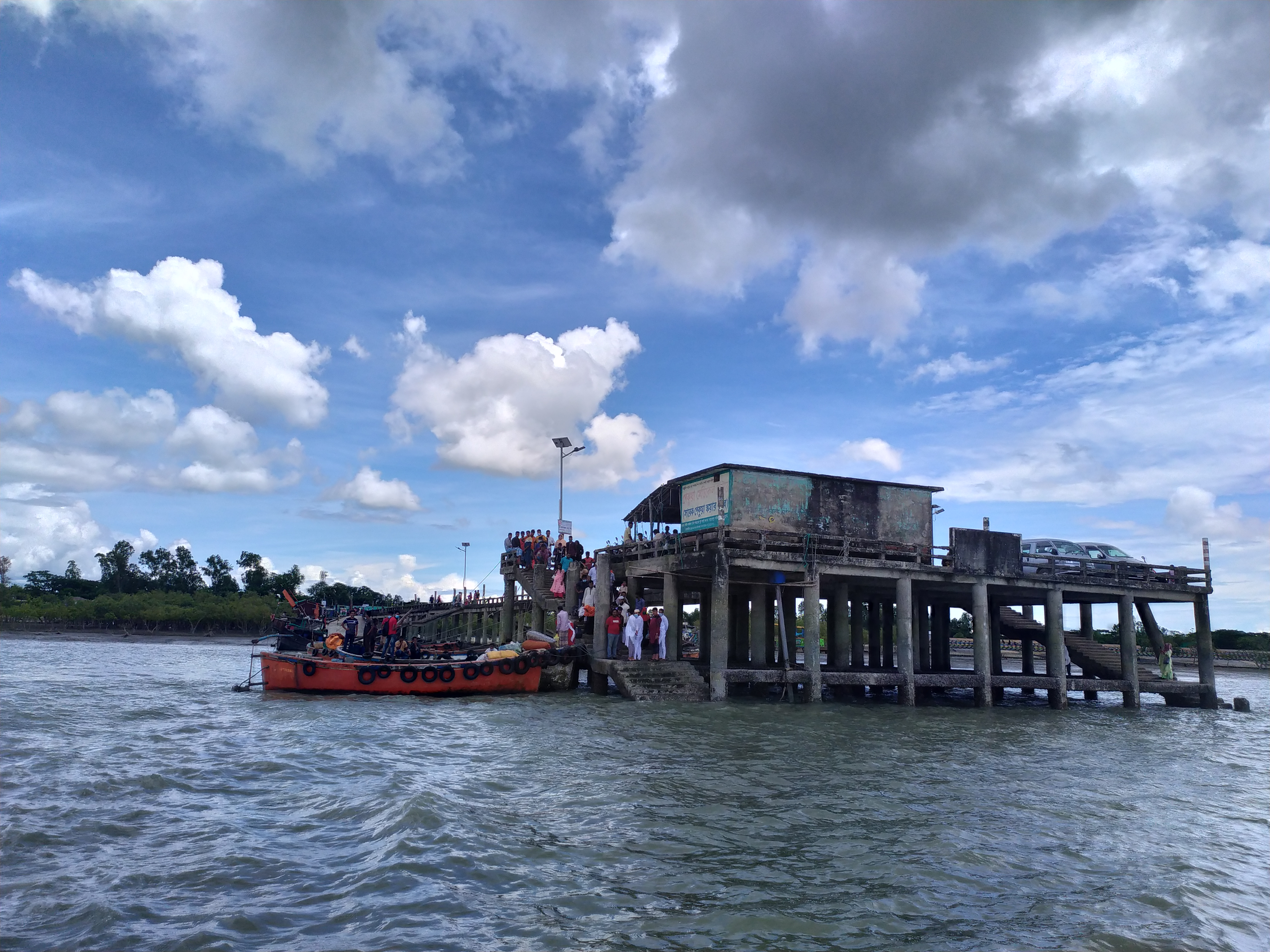
- Mognama Jetty on the Kutubdia Channel

- Coordinates: 21.8266°N 91.9689°E
- Country: Bangladesh
- Division: Chittagong
- District: Cox's Bazar

Area
  - Total: 139.61 km^{2} (53.90 sq mi)

Population (2022)
  - Total: 214,357
  - Density: 1,535.4/km^{2} (3,976.7/sq mi)
- Time zone: UTC+6 (BST)
- Postal code: 4770
- Website: pekua.coxsbazar.gov.bd

Pekua (Bengali: পেকুয়া) is an upazila, or sub-district, of Cox's Bazar District in Chittagong Division, Bangladesh.

== Administration ==
Pekua Upazila is divided into seven union parishads: Barabakia, Magnama, Pekua, Rajakhali, Shilkhali, Taitong, and Ujantia. The union parishads are subdivided into 12 mauzas and 125 villages.

== Demographics ==
Religions in Pekua Upazila (2022)
Religion	Percent
Islam	98.84%
Hinduism	0.75%
Other or not stated	0.41%

According to the 2022 Bangladeshi census, Pekua Upazila had 45,938 households and a population of 214,357. 12.93% of the population were under 5 years of age. Pekua had a literacy rate (age 7 and over) of 70.62%: 71.07% for males and 70.19% for females, and a sex ratio of 97.83 males for every 100 females. 93,052 (43.41%) lived in urban areas.

As of the 2011 Census of Bangladesh, Pekua upazila had 31,944 households and a population of 171,538. 53,340 (31.10%) were under 10 years of age. Pekua had an average literacy rate of 35.30%, compared to the national average of 51.8%, and a sex ratio of 987 females per 1000 males. 29,182 (17.02%) of the population lived in urban areas.
