= Faculties and Institutes of the University of Chittagong =

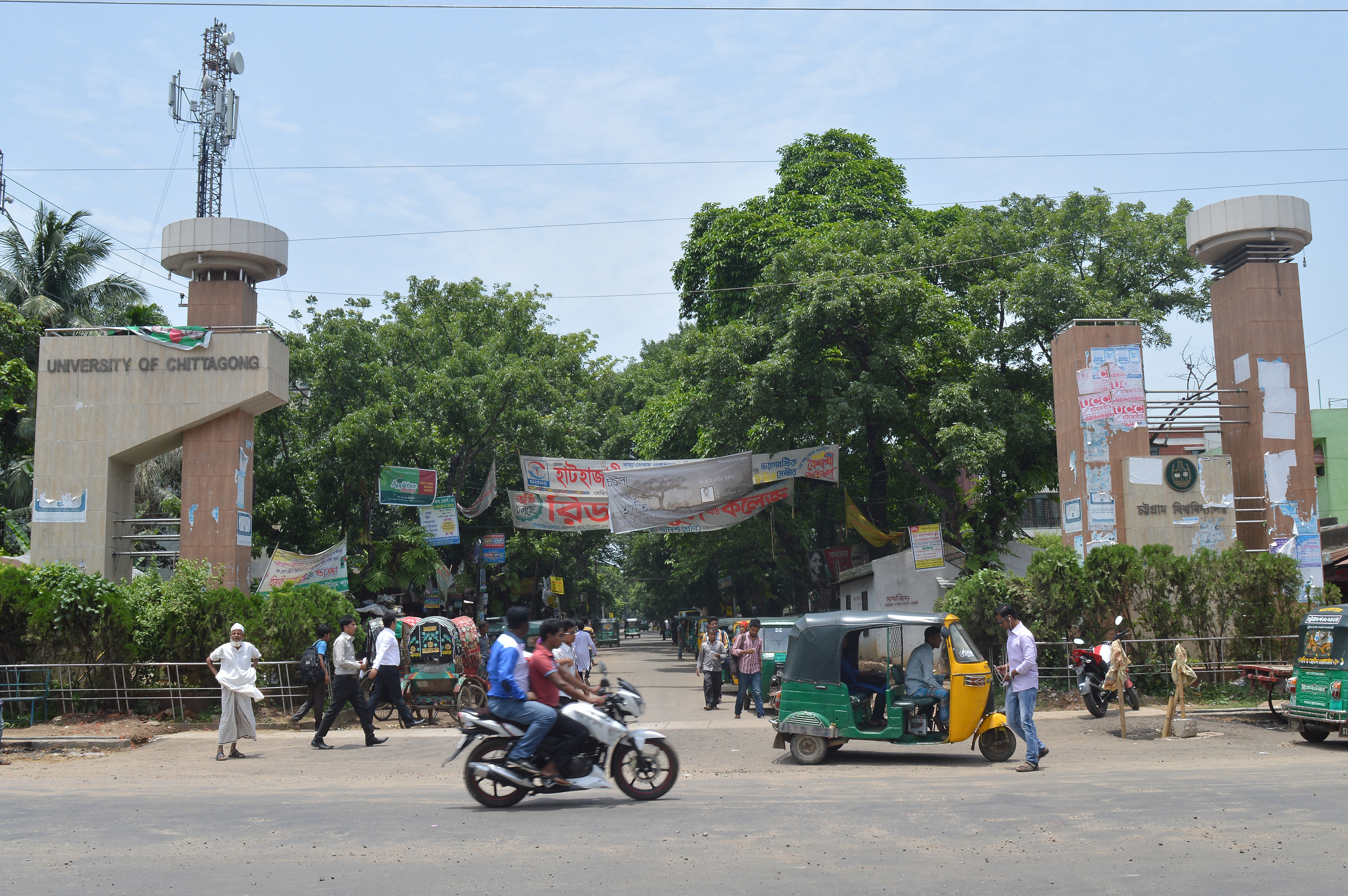
University entrance gate

As of 2022, the University of Chittagong operates 52 departments under 9 faculties. Additionally, the university has one affiliated private engineering institute—CUET Institute of Engineering and Technology (C.I.E.T)—which is located in the city of Chittagong.

== Faculties ==
=== Faculty of Arts and Humanities ===
Faculty of Arts and Humanities
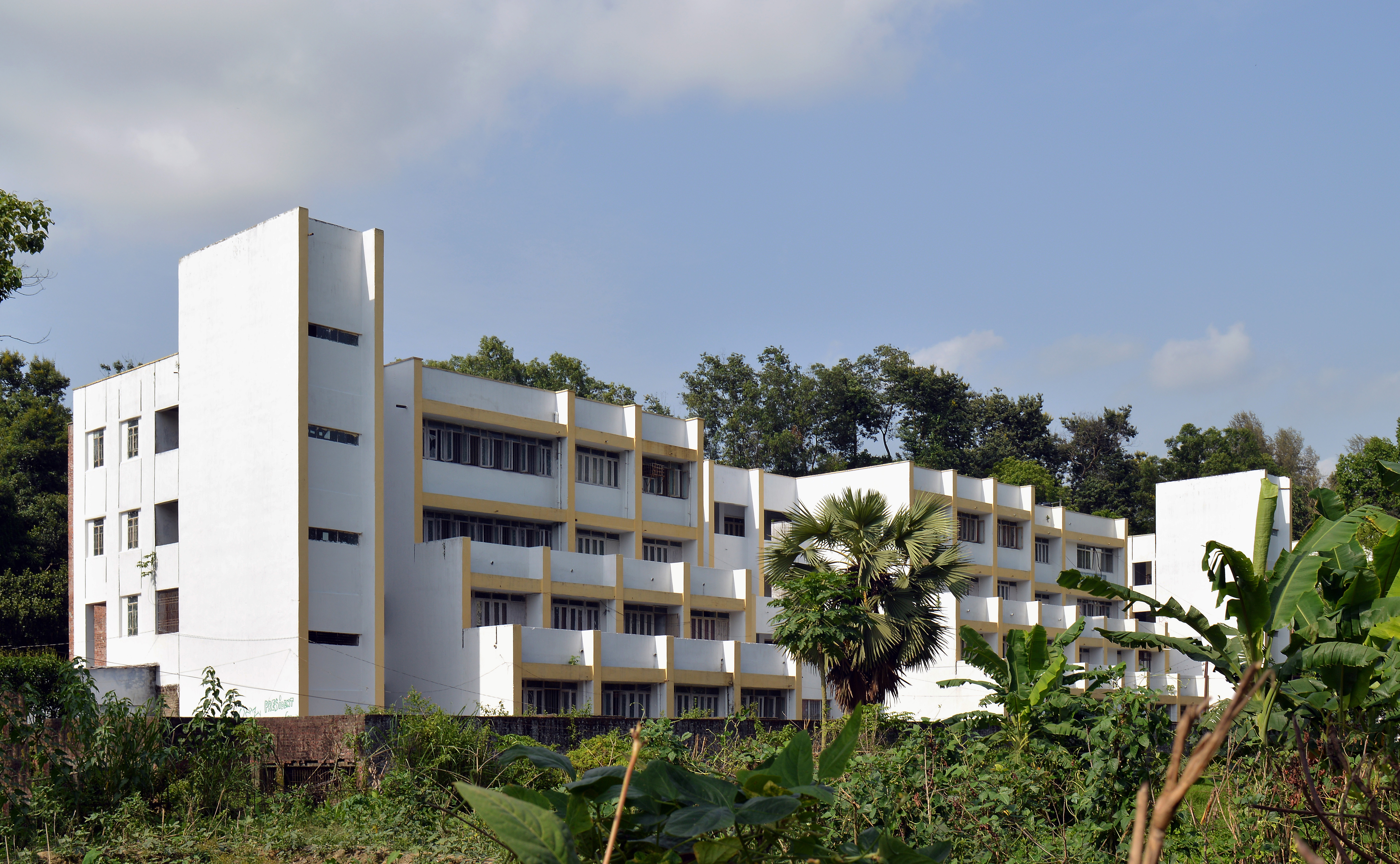
- Dr. Abdul Karim Building
- Type: Autonomous
- Established: 1966
- Parent institution: University of Chittagong
- Dean: Mohammad Sekandar Chowdhury
- Academic staff: 147
- Location: University of Chittagong Road, Hathazari, Chittagong, Bangladesh
- Website: cu.ac.bd/fah

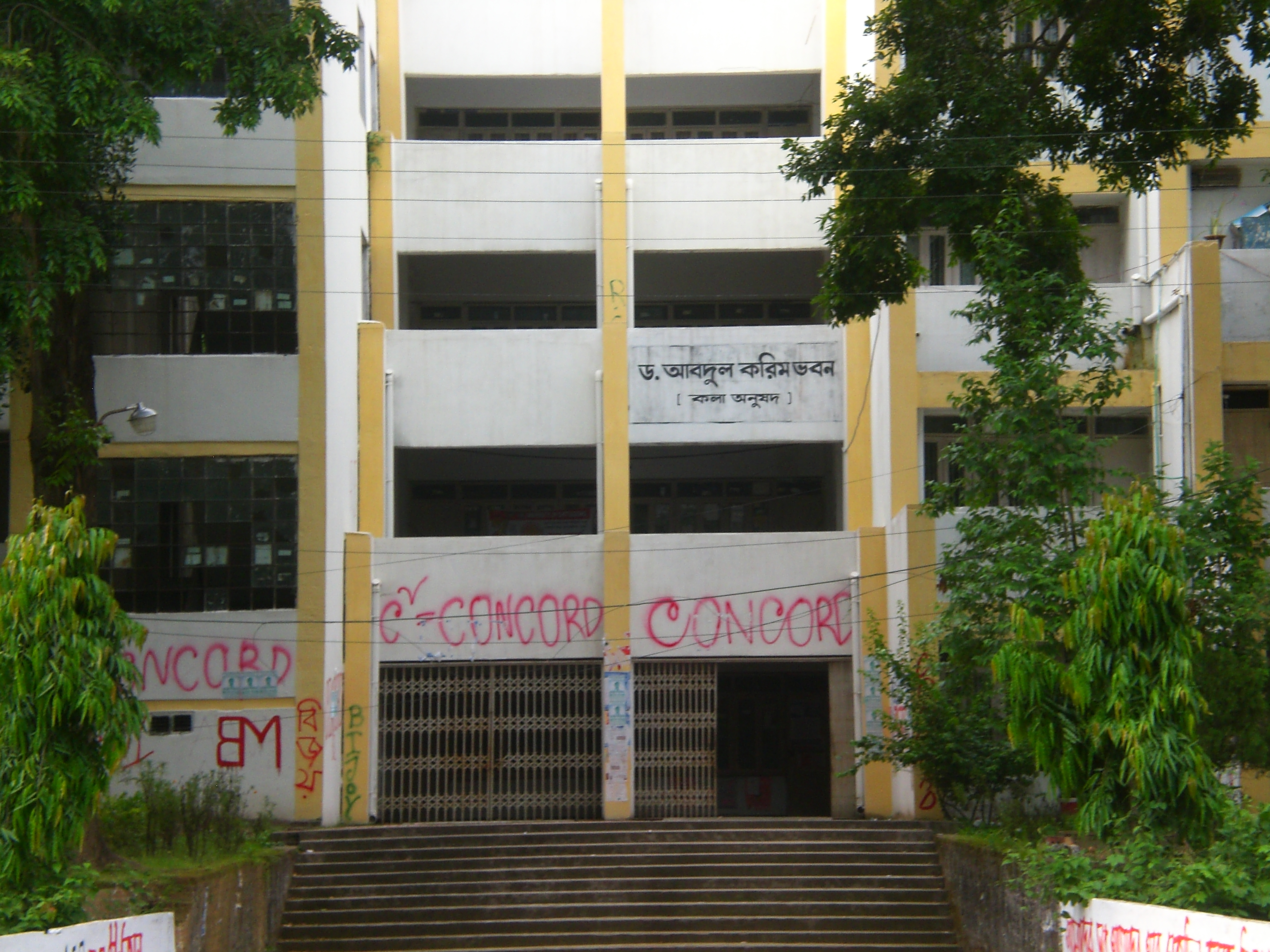
Dr. Abdul Karim Building

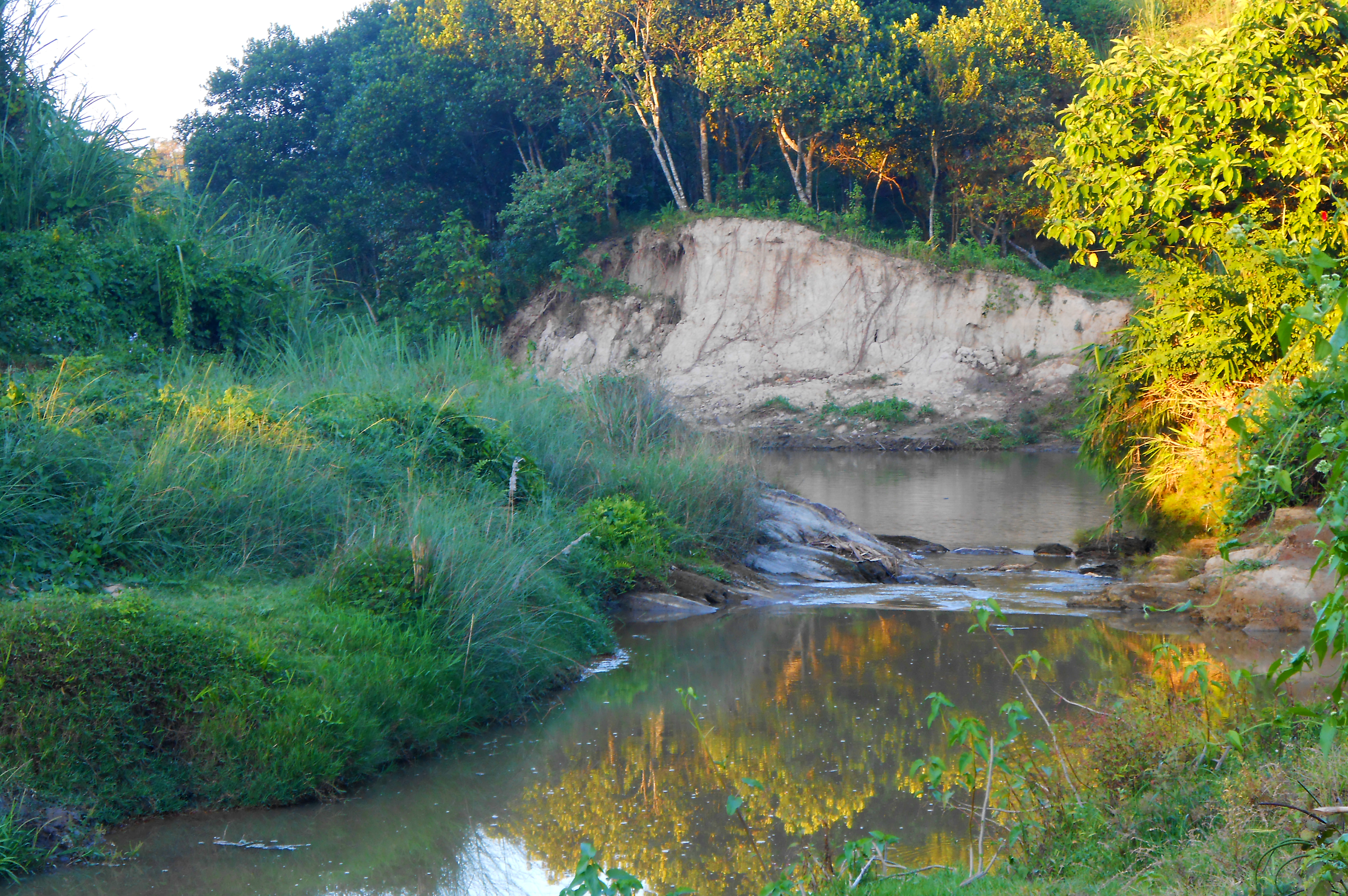
Waterfall in the hills behind the Faculty of Arts and Humanities

The Faculty of Arts and Humanities was established in 1966 at the founding of the university. It was initially named the “Arts Faculty” and later renamed to its current title. The faculty began with four departments: Bengali, English, History, and Philosophy. At present, the faculty comprises 12 departments and 3 institutes. The current dean is Mohammad Sekandar Chowdhury.

==== Departments ====
Departments	Established	Faculty Members	Number of Seats
Department of Bengali		19	
Department of English		19	
Department of History		23	
Department of Philosophy	1973	19	
Department of Islamic History and Culture	1974	18	
Department of Arabic		21	
Department of Islamic Studies		17	700
Department of Drama		3	
Department of Persian Language and Literature		13	
Department of Pali		9	
Department of Sanskrit		11	
Department of Music		9	
Department of Bangladesh Studies			

Department of Arabic
Currently, this department has 21 faculty members.

Department of History
Currently, this department has 23 faculty members.

Department of Islamic History and Culture
Currently, this department has 18 faculty members.

Department of Islamic Studies
This department started its academic activities under the Faculty of Arts in 2004. The first chairman was Anwarul Haque Khatibi. Previously, the department was part of the Arabic Department. The current chairman is A. N. M. Abdul Ma'bud. The department currently has 17 faculty members and approximately 700 students. It is located on the 3rd floor of the New Arts Building.

Department of English
Established in 1966 at the inception of the university, this department offers undergraduate and postgraduate programs in English language and English literature. Currently, it has 19 faculty members.

Department of Bengali
Also established in 1966 at the founding of the university, the department offers undergraduate and postgraduate programs in Bengali language, Bengali literature, and culture. It currently has 19 faculty members.

Department of Bangladesh Studies
This newly established department began its academic activities in the 2017–18 academic year.

Department of Philosophy
The department currently has 19 faculty members and is located on the 3rd floor of the Dr. Abdul Karim Building. The current chairman is Iqbal Shaheen Khan.

Department of Drama
On 1 September 1994, the Department of Drama and Music was established. Earlier, under the Faculty of Arts at the University of Dhaka, drama was introduced in 1989 and music in 1993 as subsidiary courses. From the 1993–94 session, M.A. (Preliminary) courses were offered in both subjects. M.Phil. courses began in 1995–96 for Music and 1997–98 for Drama. A Ph.D. program in Music is currently active. The 4-year B.A. (Honours) program in Drama began in the 1997–98 session. In 1998, an auditorium named "Nat-Mondol" was established for the department. Currently, the department has 3 faculty members.

Department of Pali
This department currently has 9 faculty members.

Department of Persian Language and Literature
Currently, this department has 13 faculty members.

Department of Music
The department has 9 faculty members.

Department of Sanskrit
Currently, the department has 11 faculty members.

==== Affiliated Institutes ====
Institutes	Faculty Members	Number of Seats
Institute of Modern Languages		
Institute of Fine Arts	30	
Institute of Education and Research (Recently shifted to Education Faculty)		

==== Affiliated Research Centers ====
- Nazrul Research Center

==== Faculty of Arts and Humanities Gallery ====
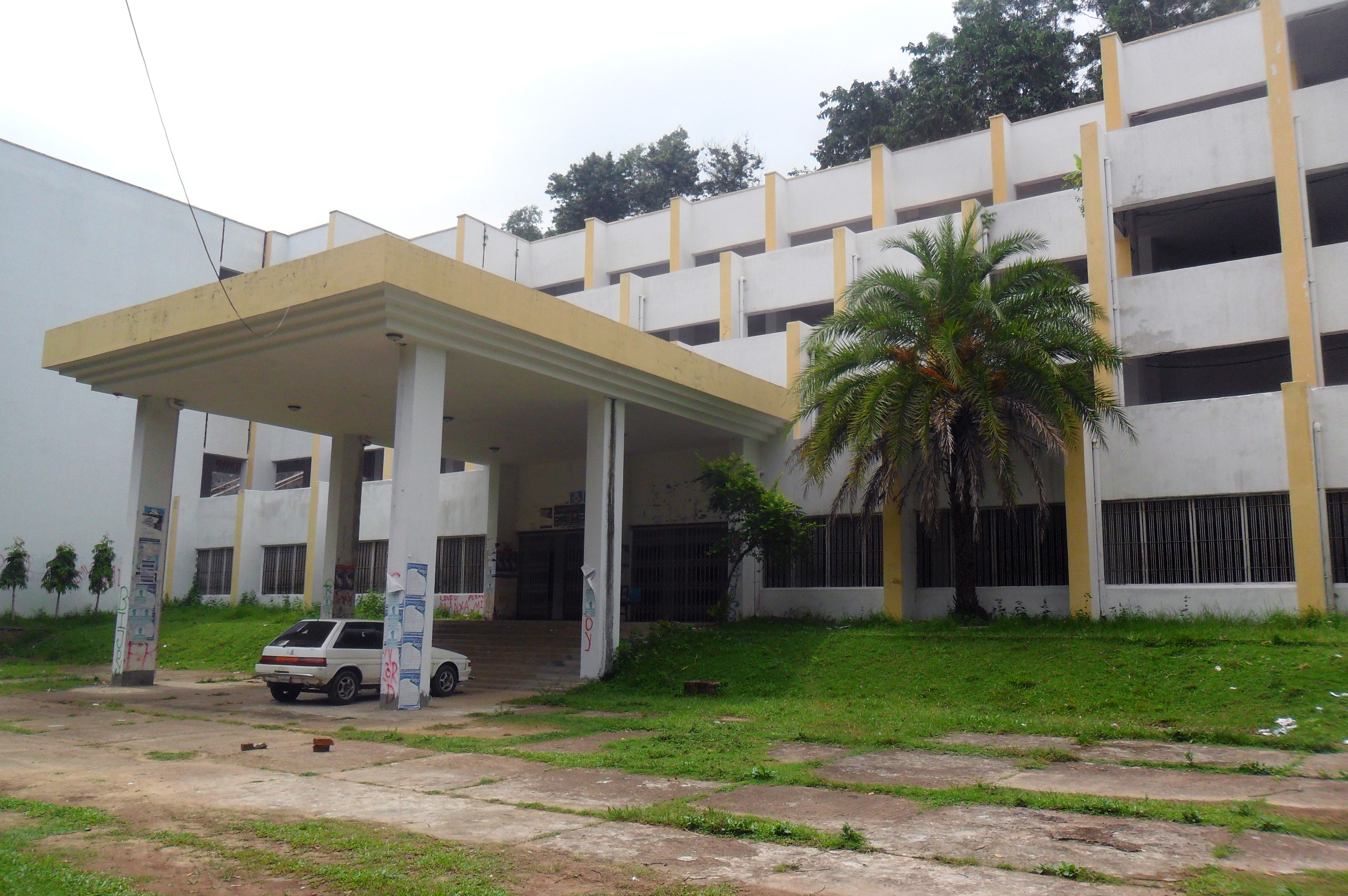

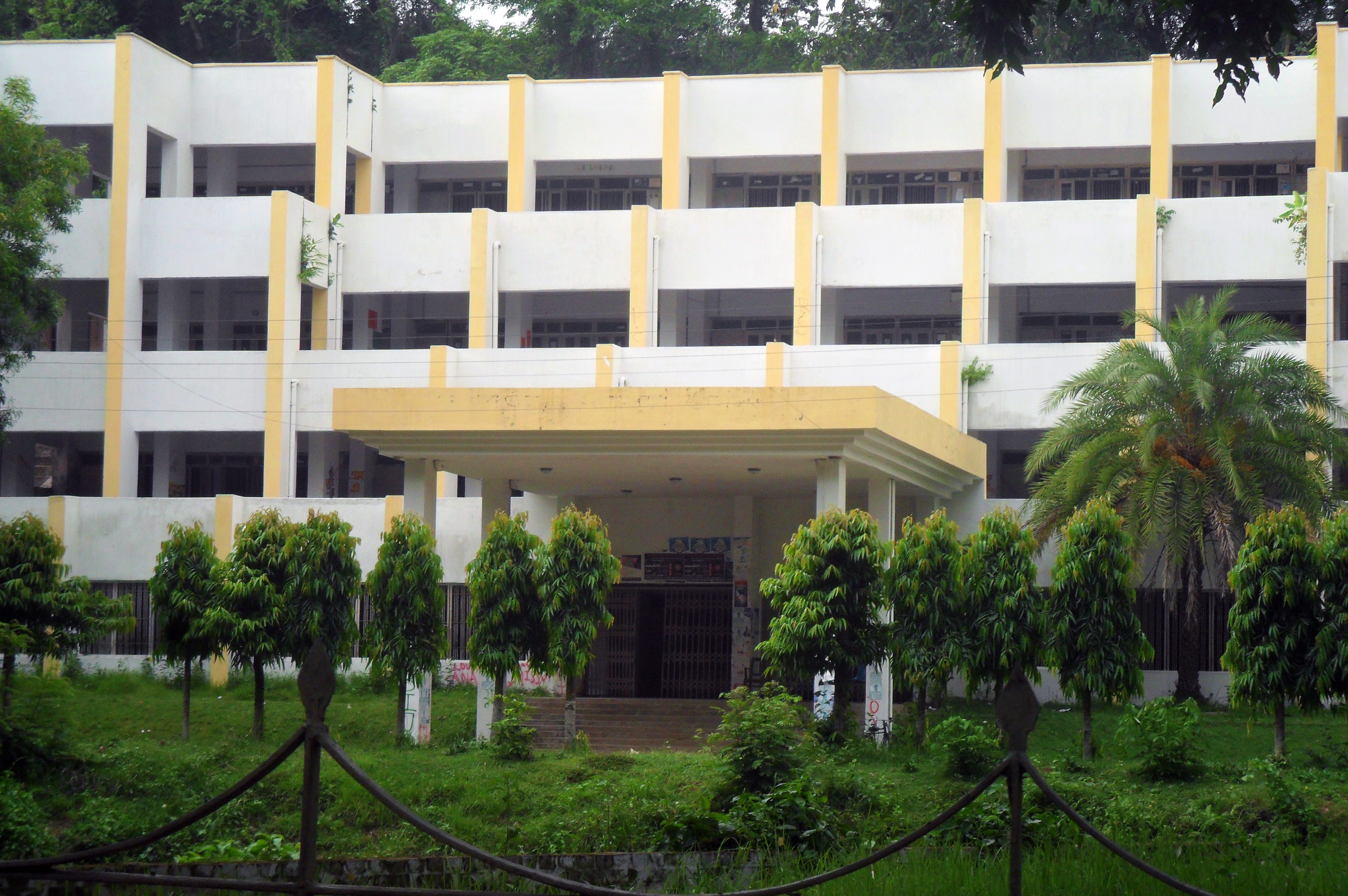

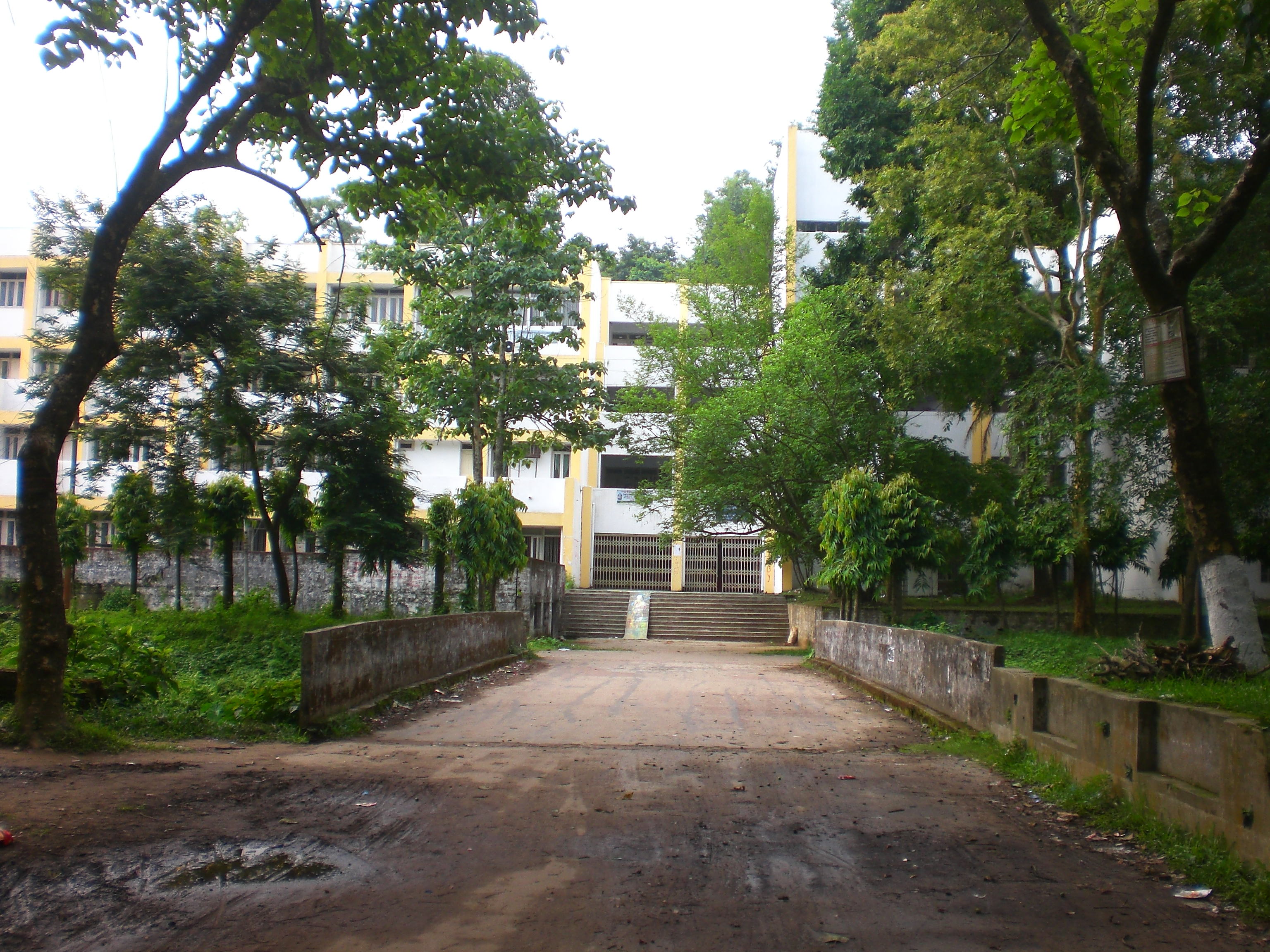

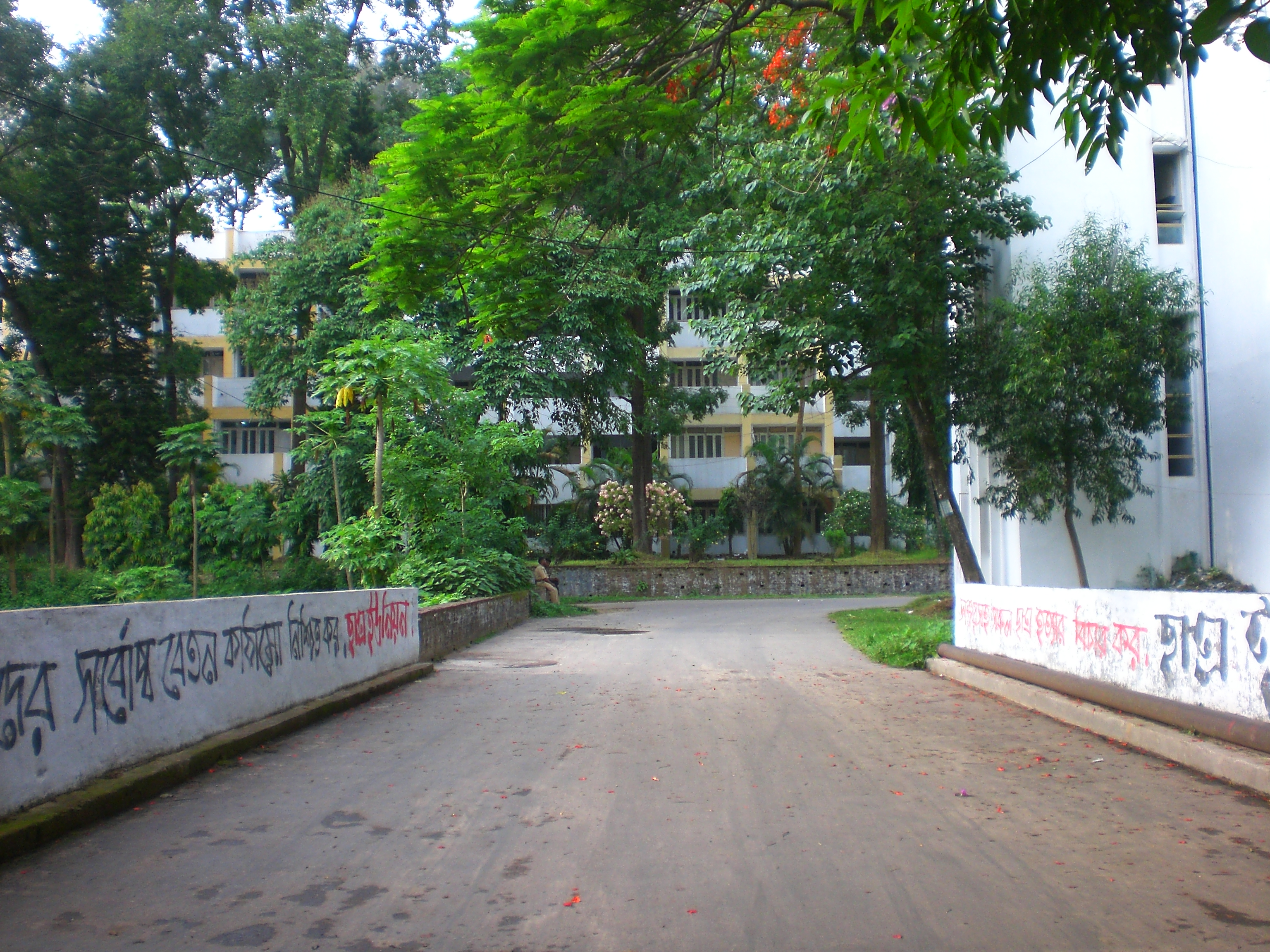

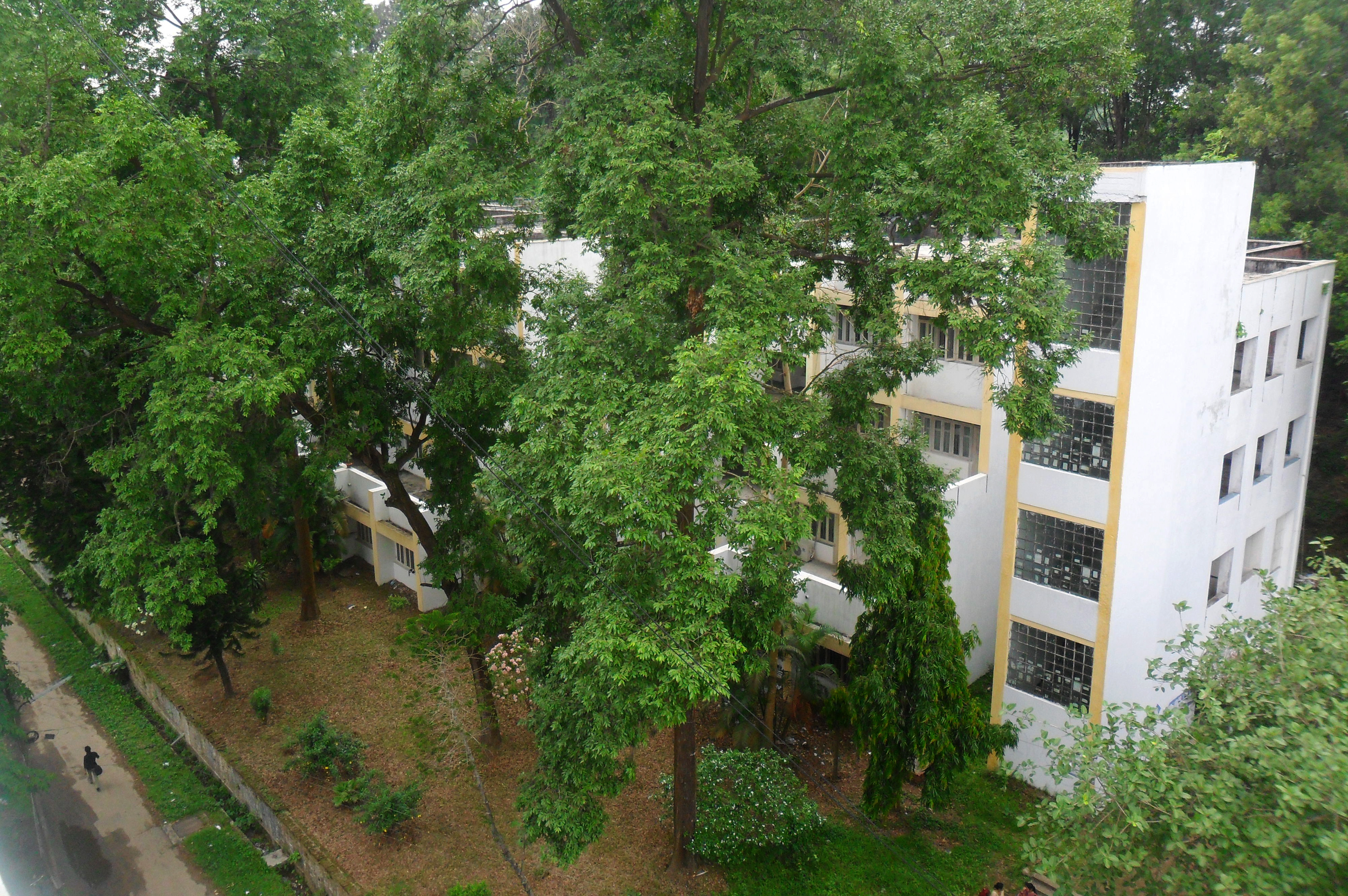

=== Faculty of Law ===
Faculty of Law
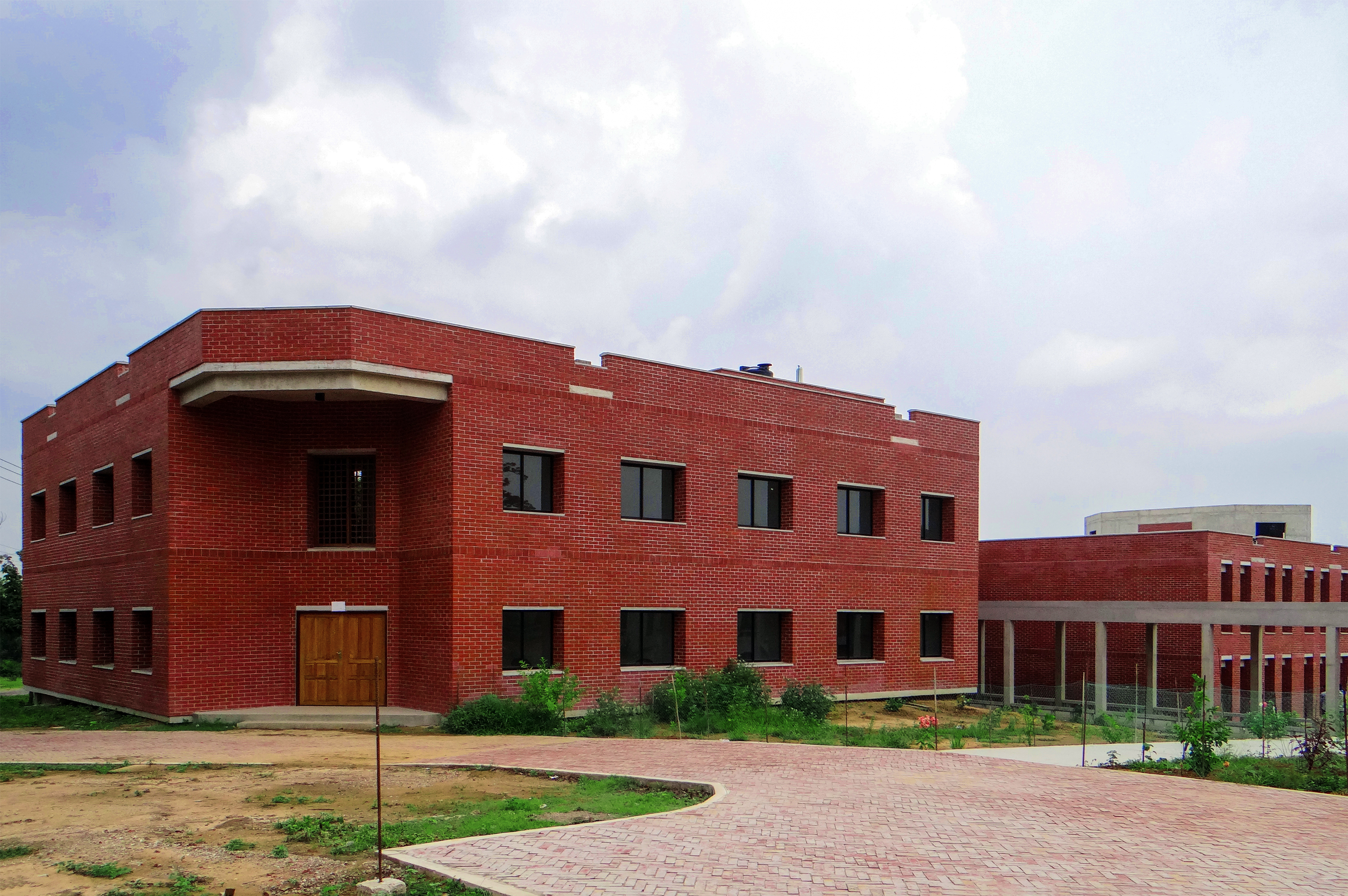
- Faculty of Law Building
- Type: Autonomous
- Established: 1966
- Parent institution: University of Chittagong
- Location: University of Chittagong Road, Hathazari, Chittagong, Bangladesh

The Faculty of Law was established in 1966, at the inception of the university.

==== Department ====
Department of Law

The Department of Law officially began its academic journey in 1992. The program started during the 1992–1993 academic year with just 4 teachers and 43 students. Currently, the faculty consists of 27 teaching staff.

In 2015, the faculty was relocated to its current location—the A.K. Khan Faculty of Law Building. Covering an area of 60,000 square feet, the building is divided into five blocks: administrative, academic, lecture gallery, student center, and auditorium. It includes five multimedia classrooms, a computer lab, a well-resourced seminar library, a 550-seat auditorium, a specially designed moot court room, separate common rooms for male and female students, a prayer room, and a cafeteria.

==== Faculty of Law Gallery ====
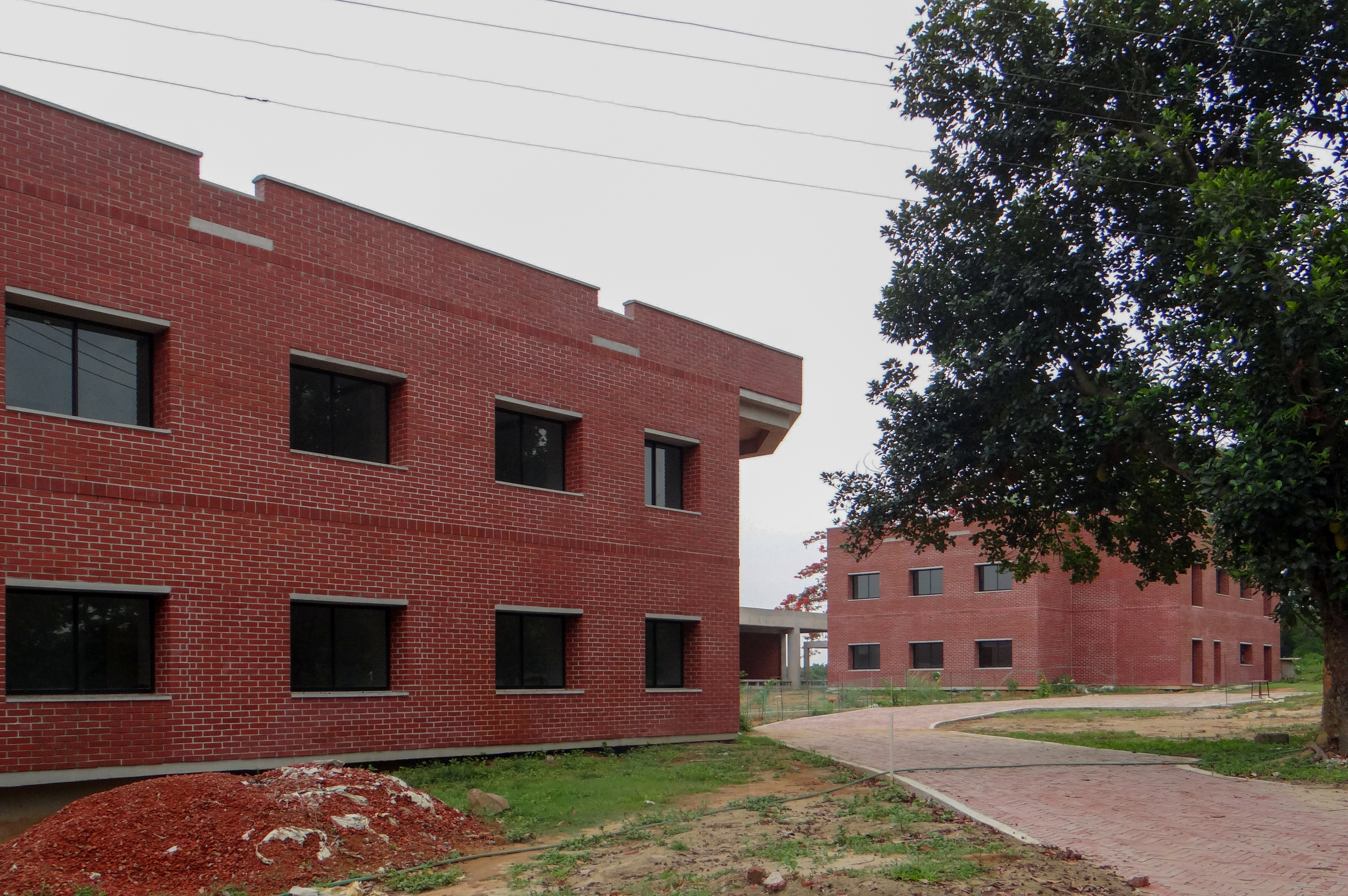

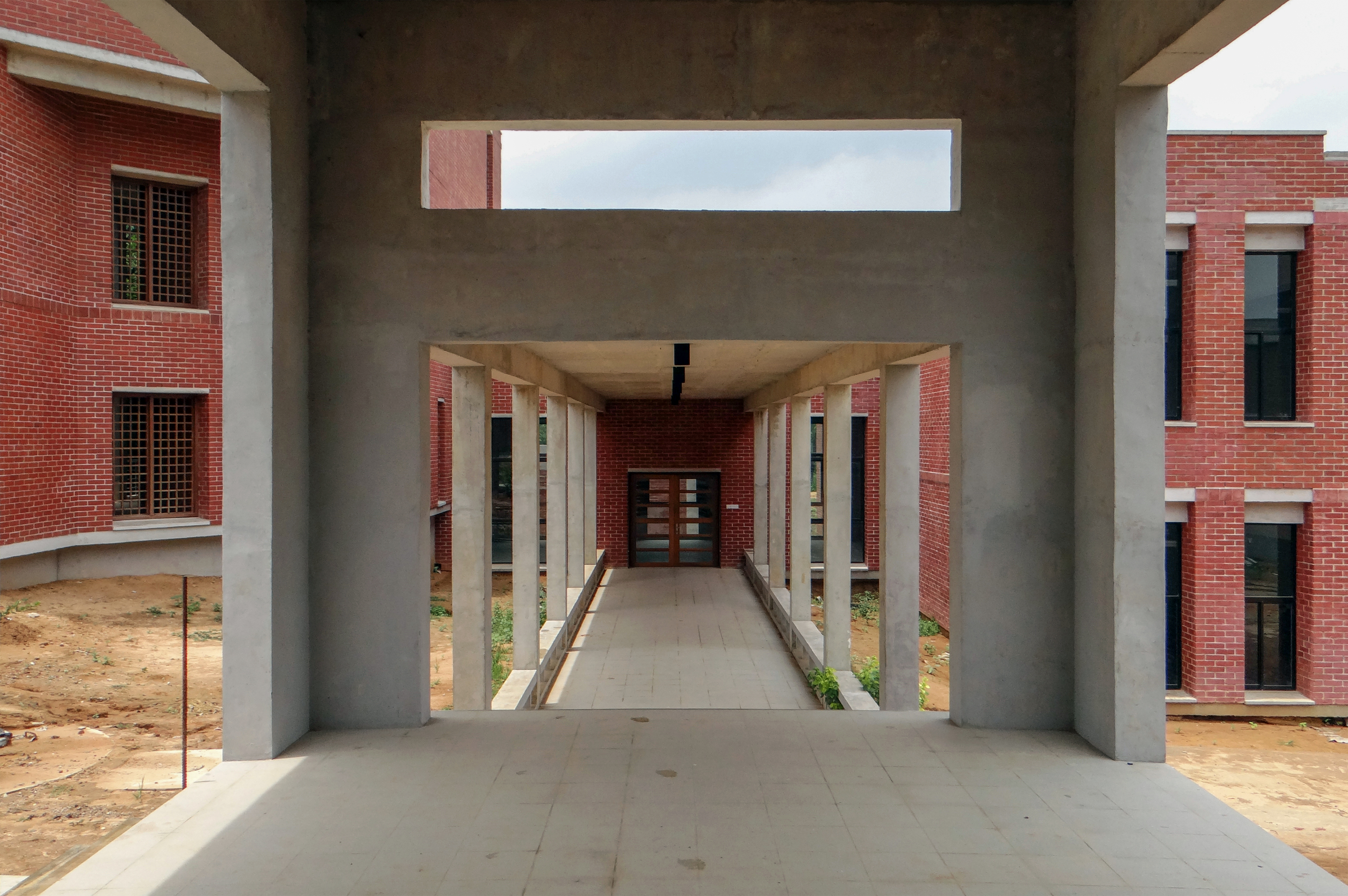

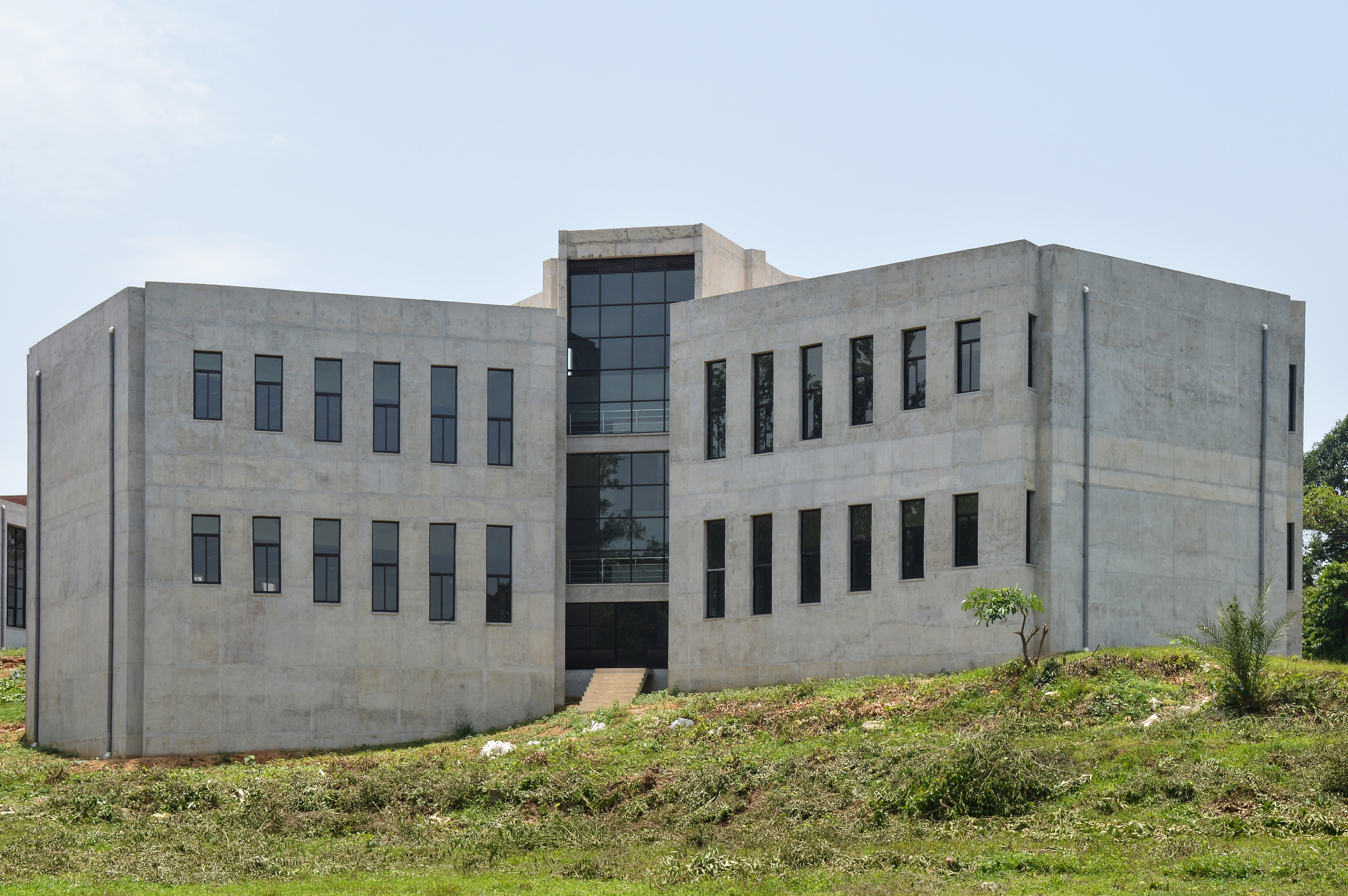

=== Faculty of Science ===
Faculty of Science
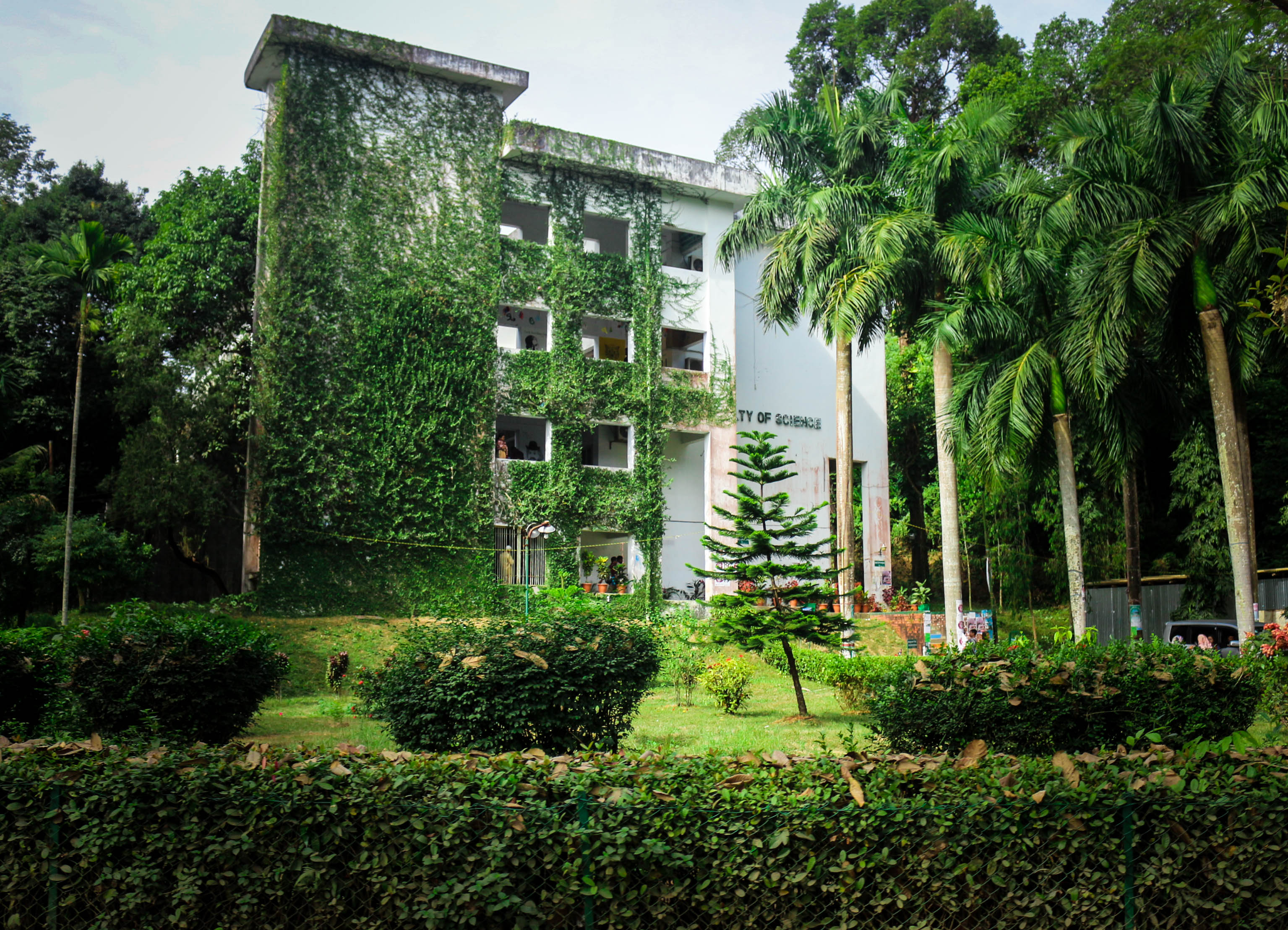
- Faculty of Science Building
- Type: Autonomous
- Established: 1969
- Parent institution: University of Chittagong
- Location: University of Chittagong Road, Hathazari, Chittagong, Bangladesh
- Website: cu.ac.bd/fsc

==== Departments ====
Departments	Established	Faculty Members	Number of Seats
Department of Physics	1968		120
Department of Chemistry	1966		
Department of Mathematics	1968	120	
Department of Statistics			
Applied Chemistry and Chemical Engineering			

Department of Physics

This department was established in 1968. It plays an important role in advancing physical sciences. The number of seats available is 120.

Department of Chemistry

The department began its academic activities in 1966, at the founding of the university.

Department of Mathematics

The Department of Mathematics was established on 1 November 1968. Notable physicist, mathematician, astronomer, and cosmologist Jamal Nazrul Islam served as the department's chairman from 1986 to 1988. The department currently offers 120 seats.

Department of Statistics

(No additional details available.)

Applied Chemistry and Chemical Engineering

This department was established in 2011. Mohammad Helal Uddin served as the founding chairman. Currently, Suman Ganguly is serving as the department's chairman.

==== Faculty of Science Gallery ====
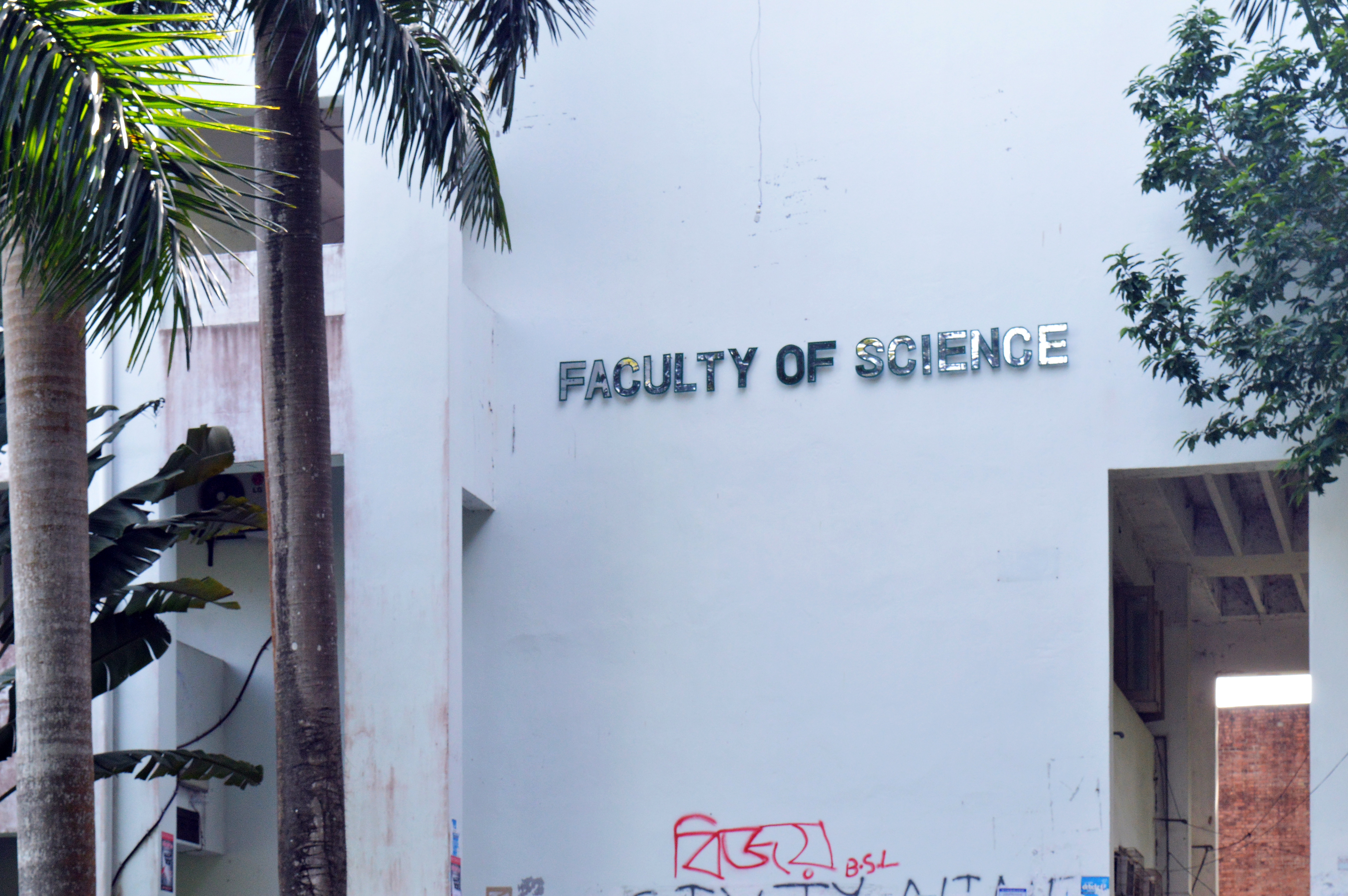

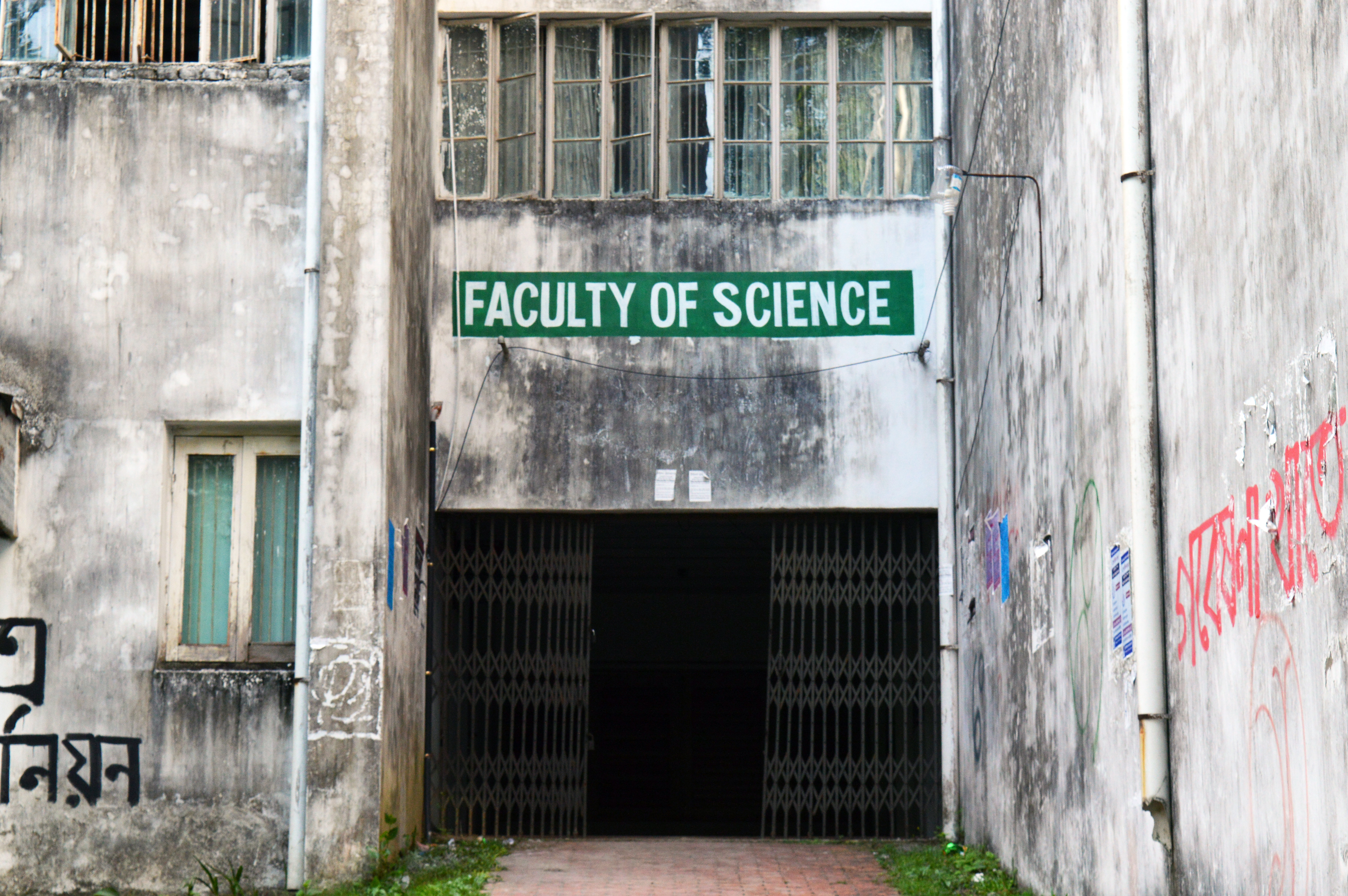

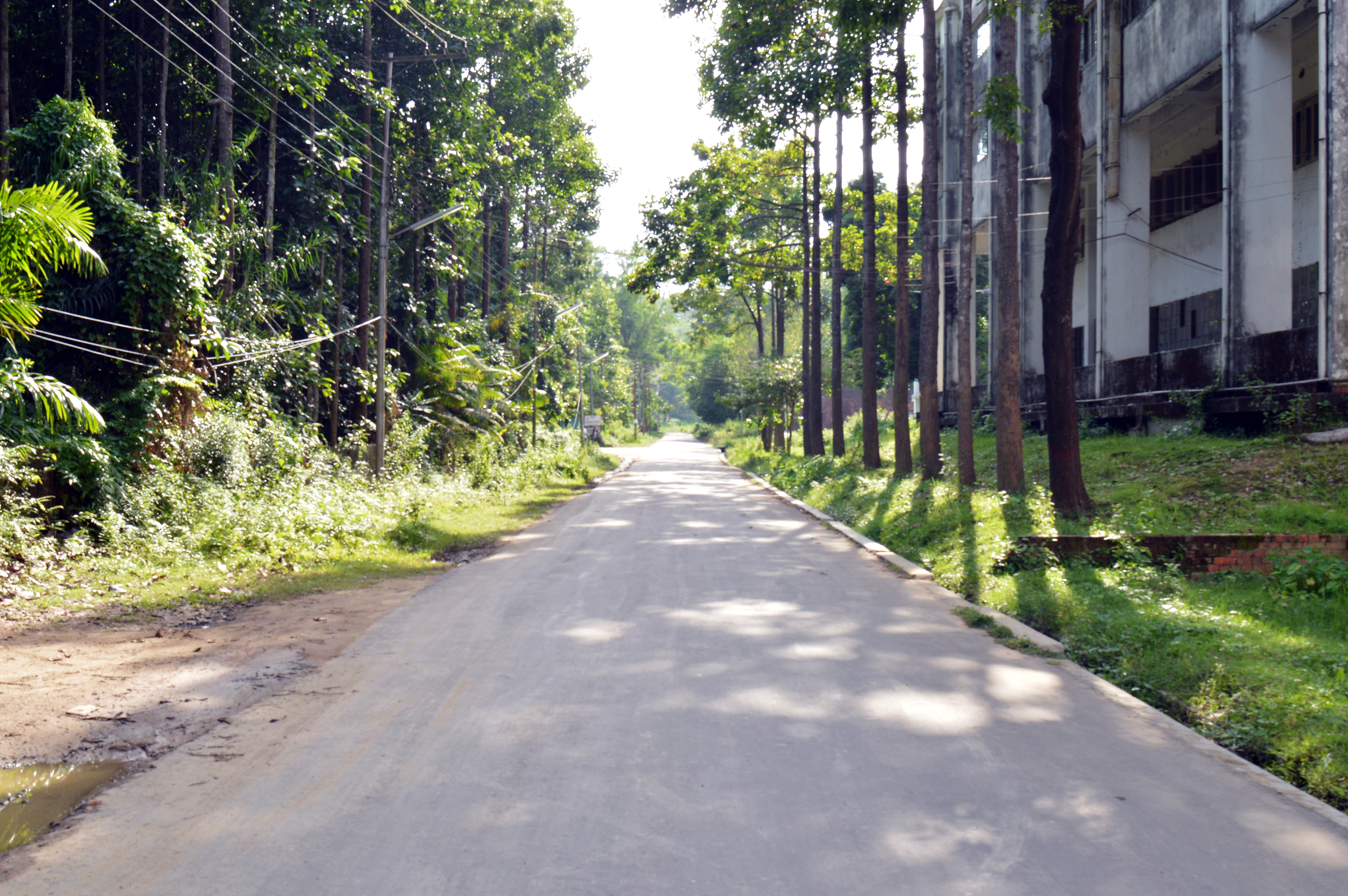

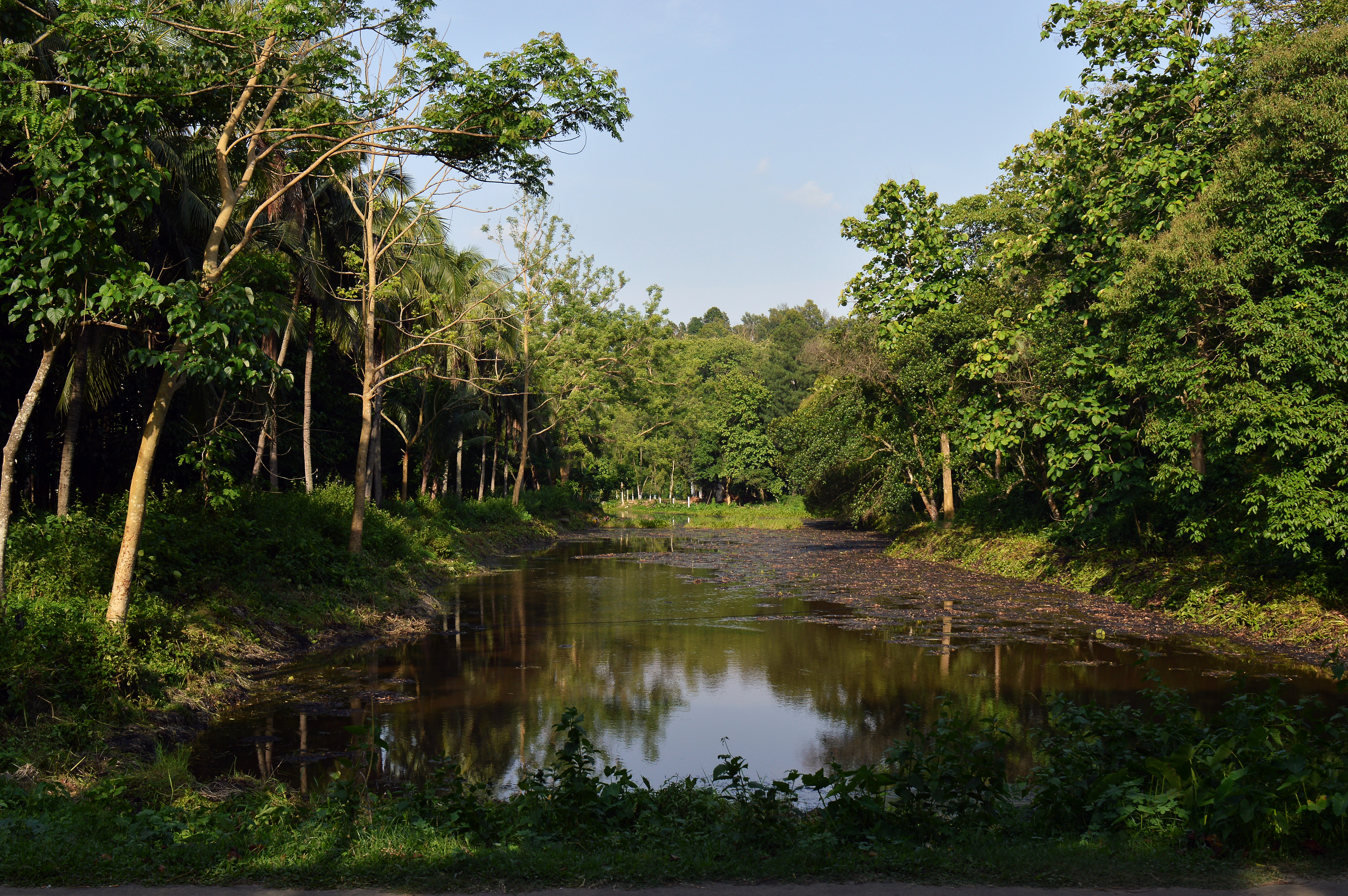

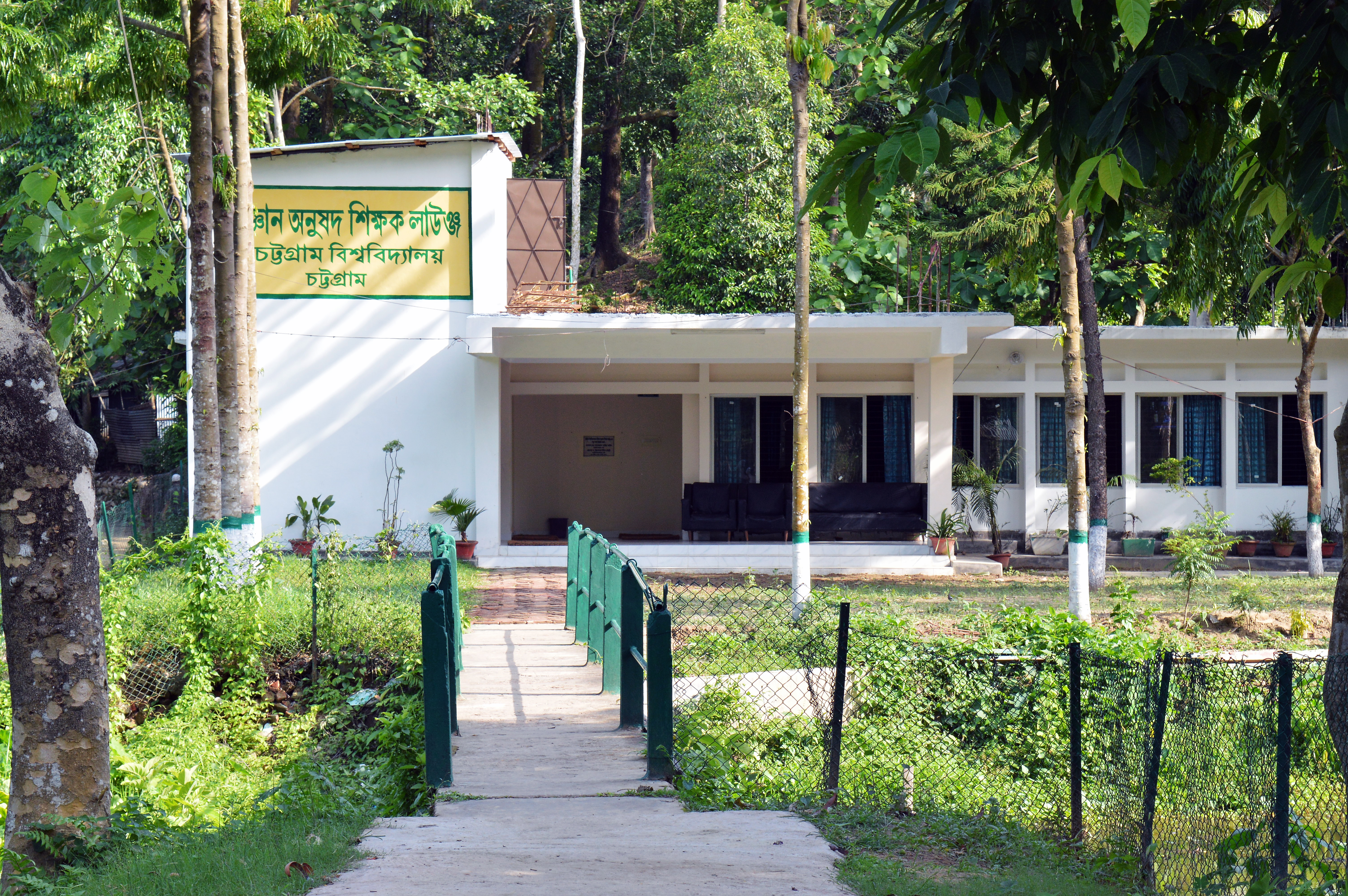
Teachers' Lounge

=== Faculty of Business Administration ===
Faculty of Business Administration
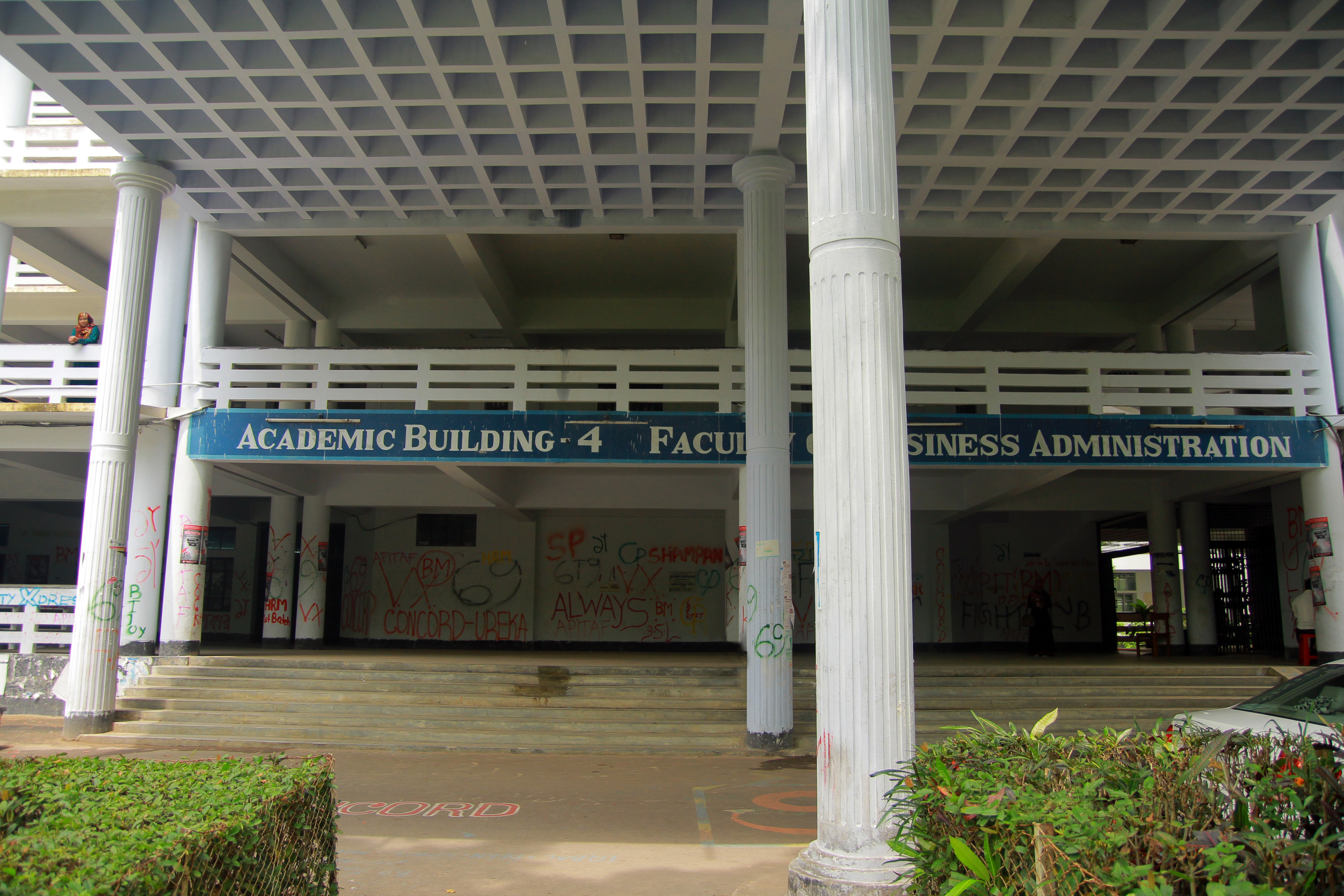
- Faculty of Business Administration Building
- Type: Autonomous
- Established: 1970
- Parent institution: University of Chittagong
- Dean: A.F.M. Aurangzeb
- Academic staff: 130
- Location: University of Chittagong Road, Hathazari, Chittagong, Bangladesh
- Website: cu.ac.bd/fba

The Faculty of Business Administration began its academic operations in 1970 to provide undergraduate and postgraduate education in commerce. The faculty currently has 130 academic members. The present dean is Jahangir Alam.

==== Departments ====
Departments	Established	Faculty Members	Number of Seats
Department of Accounting and Information Systems	1968	32	
Department of Management	1988	29	
Department of Finance		26	
Department of Marketing	1 November 1992	32	700
Department of Human Resource Management	2013	4	
Department of Banking and Insurance	2013	4	
Center for Business Administration		1	
Bureau of Business Research		2	

Department of Accounting and Information Systems

The department currently has 32 faculty members.

Department of Management

This department currently has 29 faculty members.

Department of Finance

This department currently has 26 faculty members.

Department of Marketing

The department currently has 32 faculty members.

Department of Banking and Insurance

In response to national demand for skilled human resources in the banking and insurance sectors, this department was established in 2012. The current head is Sultan Ahmed. It currently has 4 faculty members.

Department of Human Resource Management

To meet the needs of the business and industrial sectors, the Department of Human Resource Management was established at the University of Chittagong in 2012—being the first of its kind in the country. The current head of the department is A.F.M. Aurangzeb. The department has 4 faculty members.

Center for Business Administration

This unit currently has 1 faculty member.

Bureau of Business Research

This unit currently has 2 faculty members.

==== Faculty of Business Administration Gallery ====
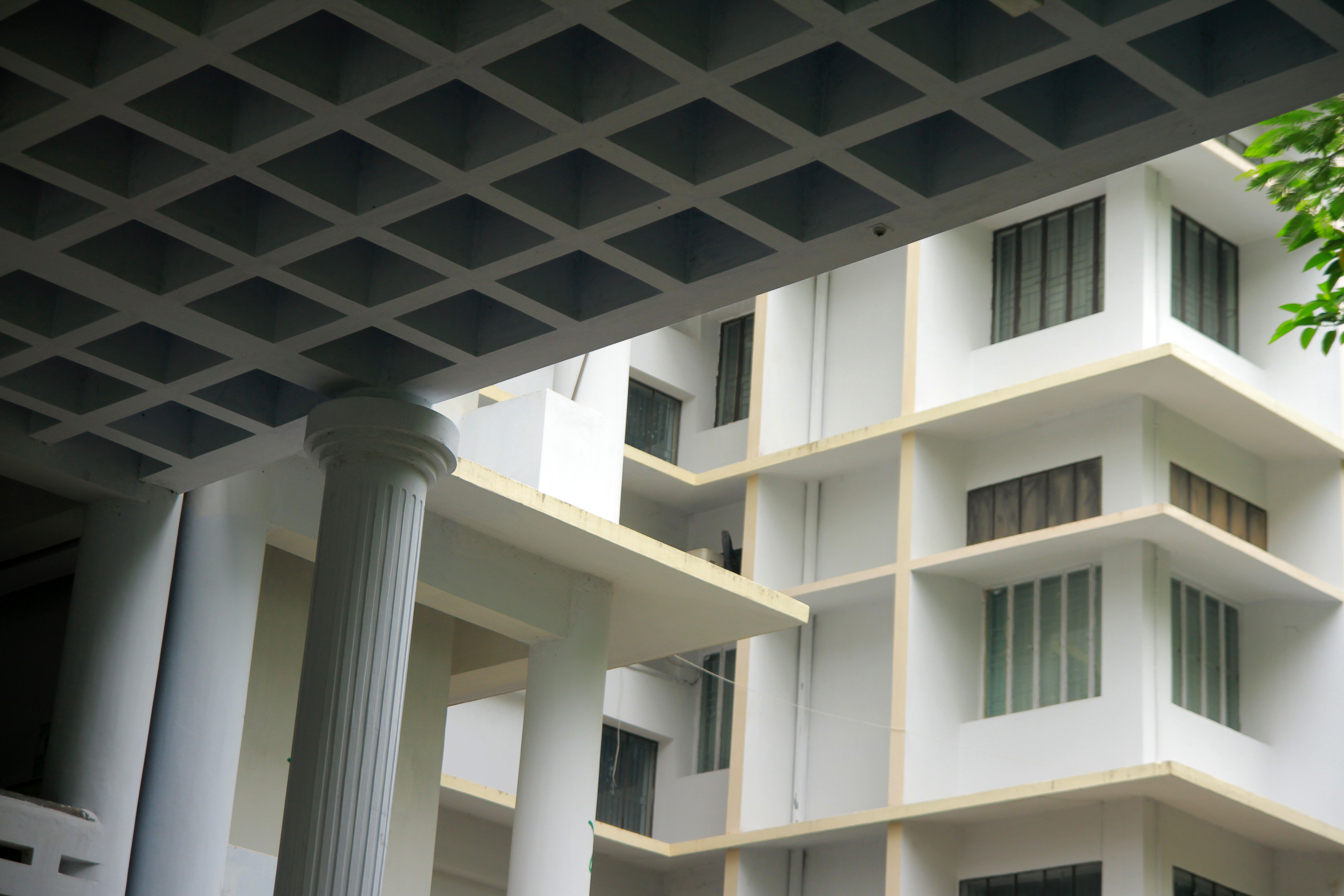

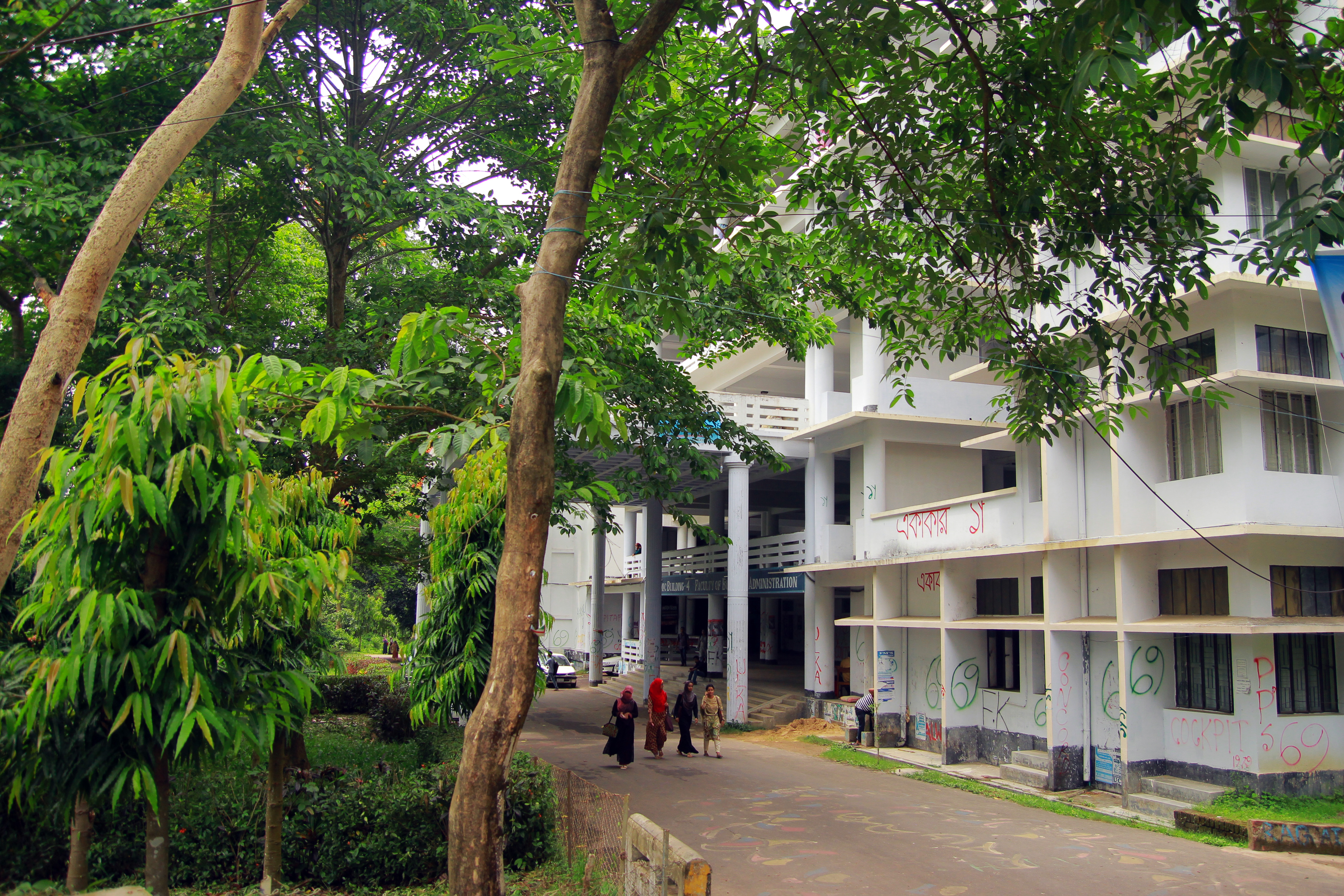

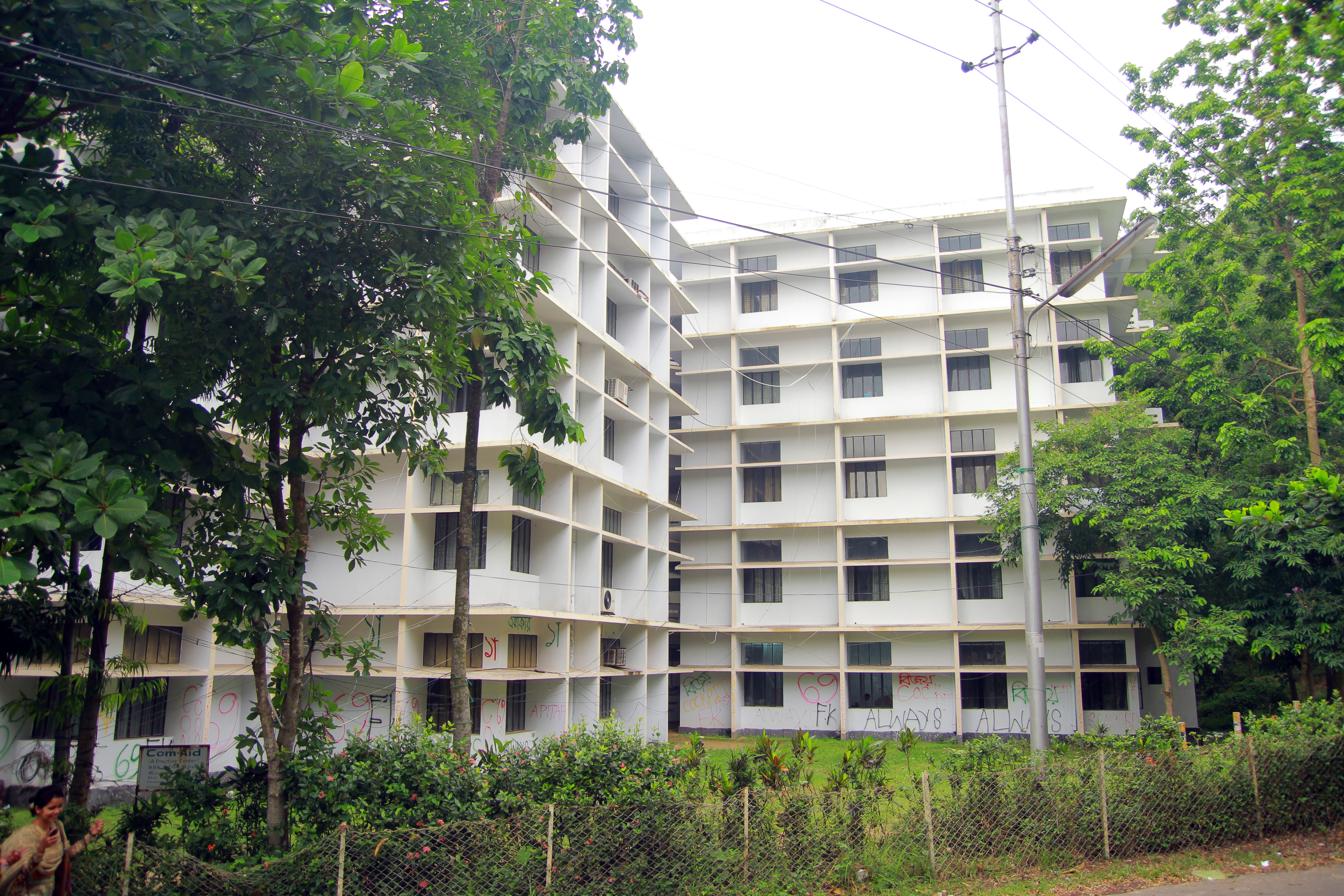

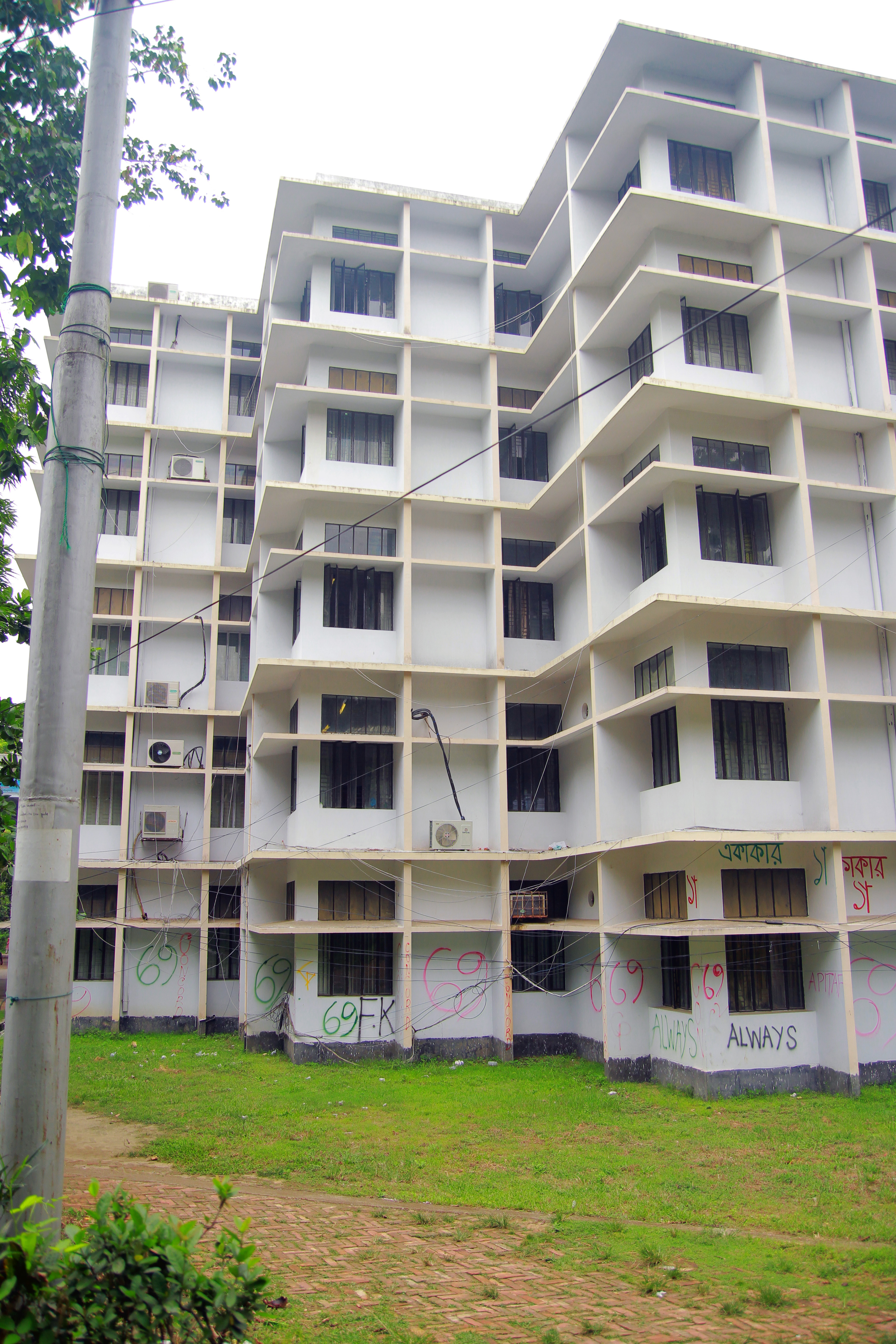

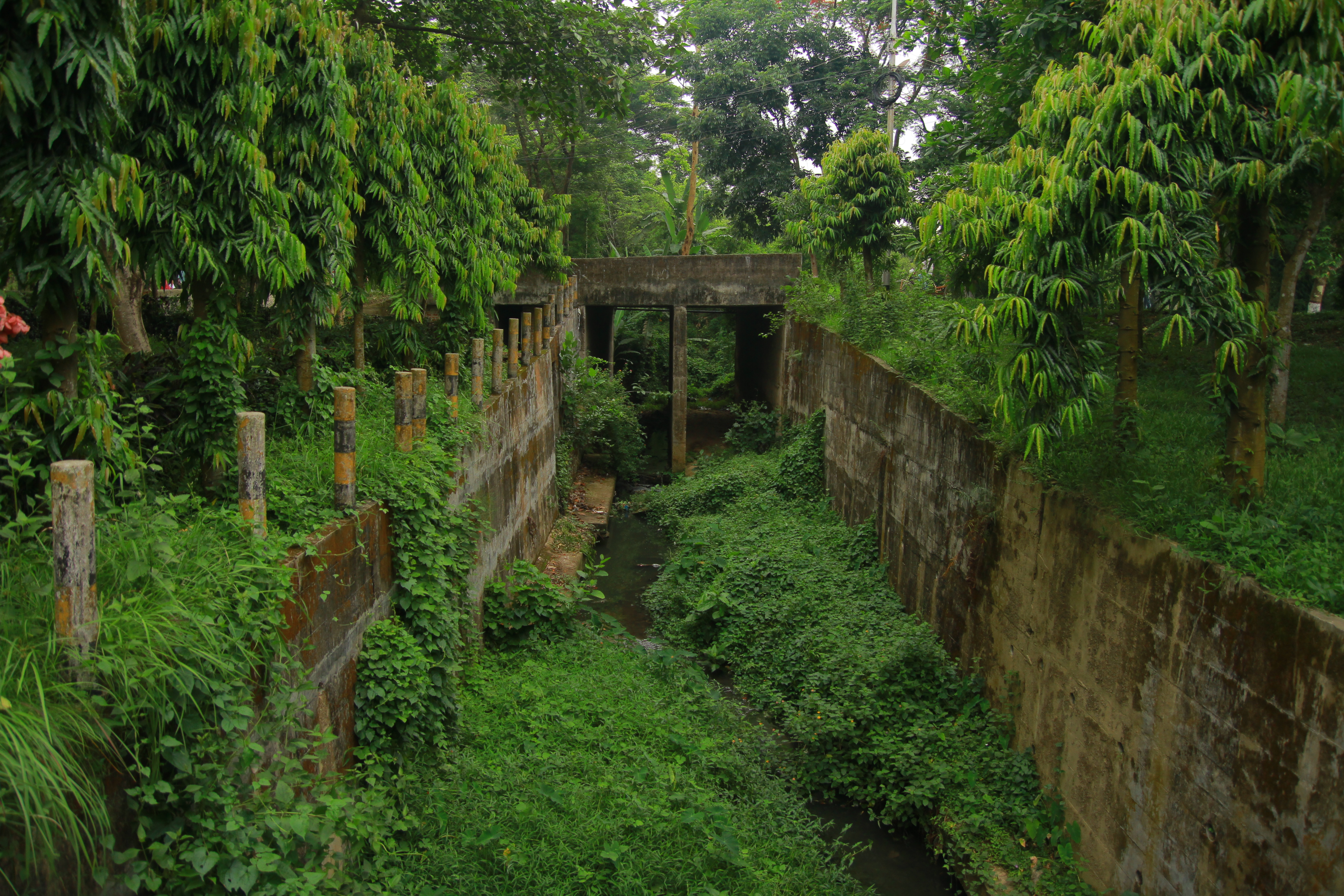

=== Faculty of Social Sciences ===
Faculty of Social Sciences
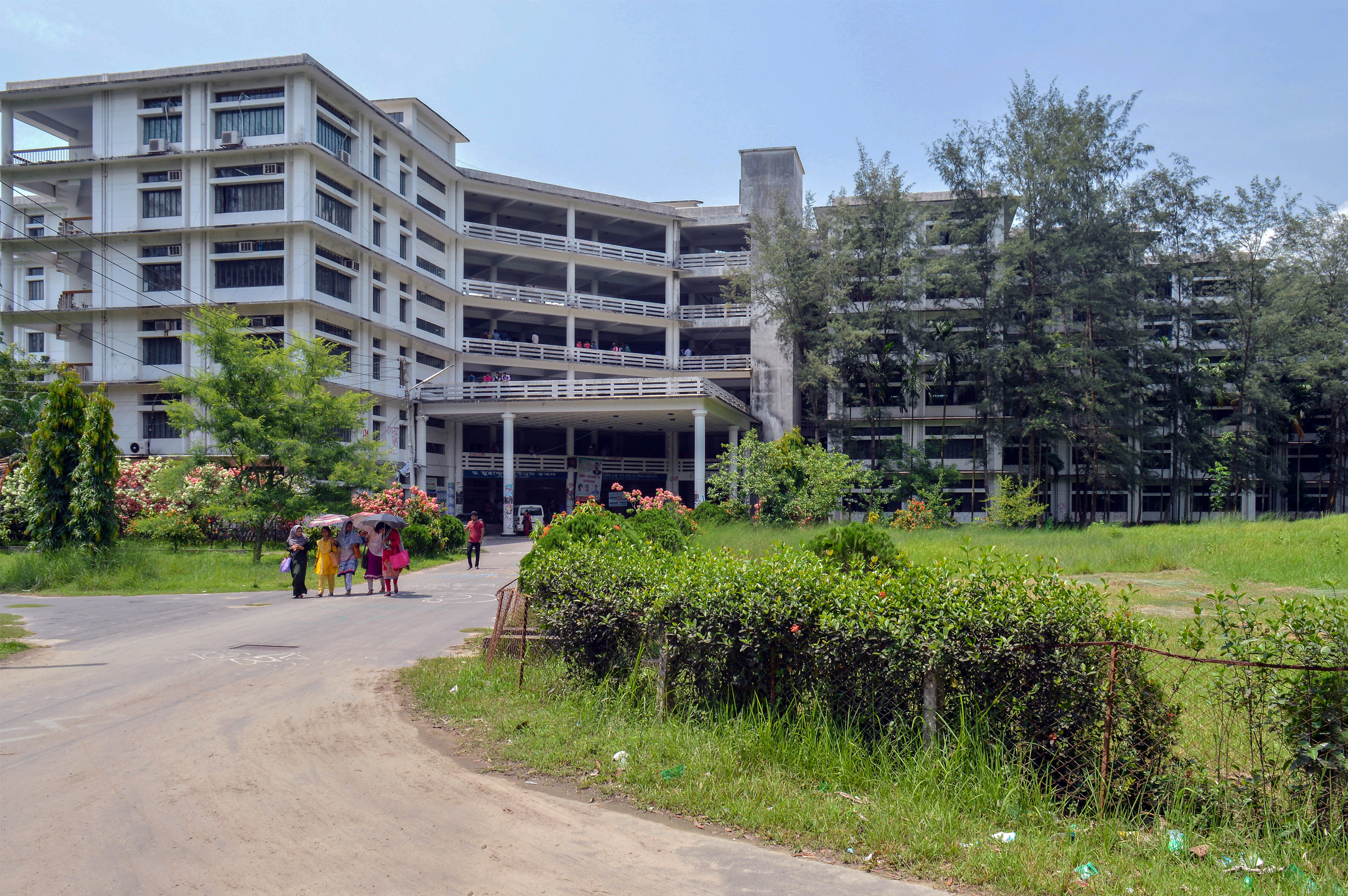
- Dr. Muhammad Yunus Building
- Type: Autonomous
- Established: 1971
- Parent institution: University of Chittagong
- Academic staff: 113
- Location: University of Chittagong Road, Hathazari, Chittagong, Bangladesh

The Faculty of Social Sciences is one of the constituent faculties of the University of Chittagong. It is located in the university's campus in Hathazari Upazila, Chittagong. As of now, the faculty comprises 9 departments and employs 131 academic staff members. The total number of seats is 758, with 323 for the Humanities stream, 262 for Science, and 173 for Business Studies.

The faculty is located just north of the university's Central Shaheed Minar, housed in the Dr. Muhammad Yunus Building—a six-storied, modern facility where each floor is assigned to different departments. The building includes both stairs and elevators.

==== Departments ====
Departments	Faculty Members	Number of Seats
Department of Economics	28	150
Department of Political Science	25	150
Department of Sociology	28	170
Department of Public Administration	20	150
Department of Anthropology	10	70
Department of International Relations	7	60
Department of Communication and Journalism	17	70
Department of Criminology and Police Science		
Department of Development Studies		
Social Science Research Institute	1	

Department of Economics

Located on the third floor of the Faculty of Social Sciences building. The department has 28 faculty members and offers 150 seats.

Department of Political Science

Located on the second floor. It currently has 25 faculty members and 150 seats.

Department of Sociology

The department was founded in 1969 by R. I. Chowdhury, following the model of the sociology department first opened at the University of Dhaka in 1957 by UNESCO and Pierre Bessanett. Initially offering only an M.A. program, it later introduced B.A. (Honours) and B.S.S. (Honours) degrees. Currently, it offers B.S.S., M.S.S., M.Phil., and Ph.D. programs. The department has 28 faculty members: 8 professors, 3 associate professors, 8 assistant professors, and 9 lecturers. It is located on the 4th floor of the faculty building and features separate teacher areas, classrooms, a modern computer lab, conference room, and a seminar library.

Department of Public Administration

Located on the first floor. The department has 20 faculty members and 150 seats.

Department of Anthropology

Located on the fourth floor. The department currently has 10 faculty members and 70 seats.

Department of International Relations

Located on the sixth floor. It currently has 7 faculty members and 60 seats.

Department of Communication and Journalism

Originally established as the "Department of Journalism" under the Faculty of Arts on December 1, 1994, with 2 teachers and 23 students. In 2003, it was renamed as the "Department of Communication and Journalism," and began offering courses in interpersonal, mass, organizational, political, and development communication. On January 31, 2009, the department was officially placed under the Faculty of Social Sciences. It is now located on the 5th floor of the Dr. Muhammad Yunus Building. The department has 17 faculty members and 70 seats.

Social Science Research Institute

Currently has 1 faculty member.

==== Faculty of Social Sciences Gallery ====
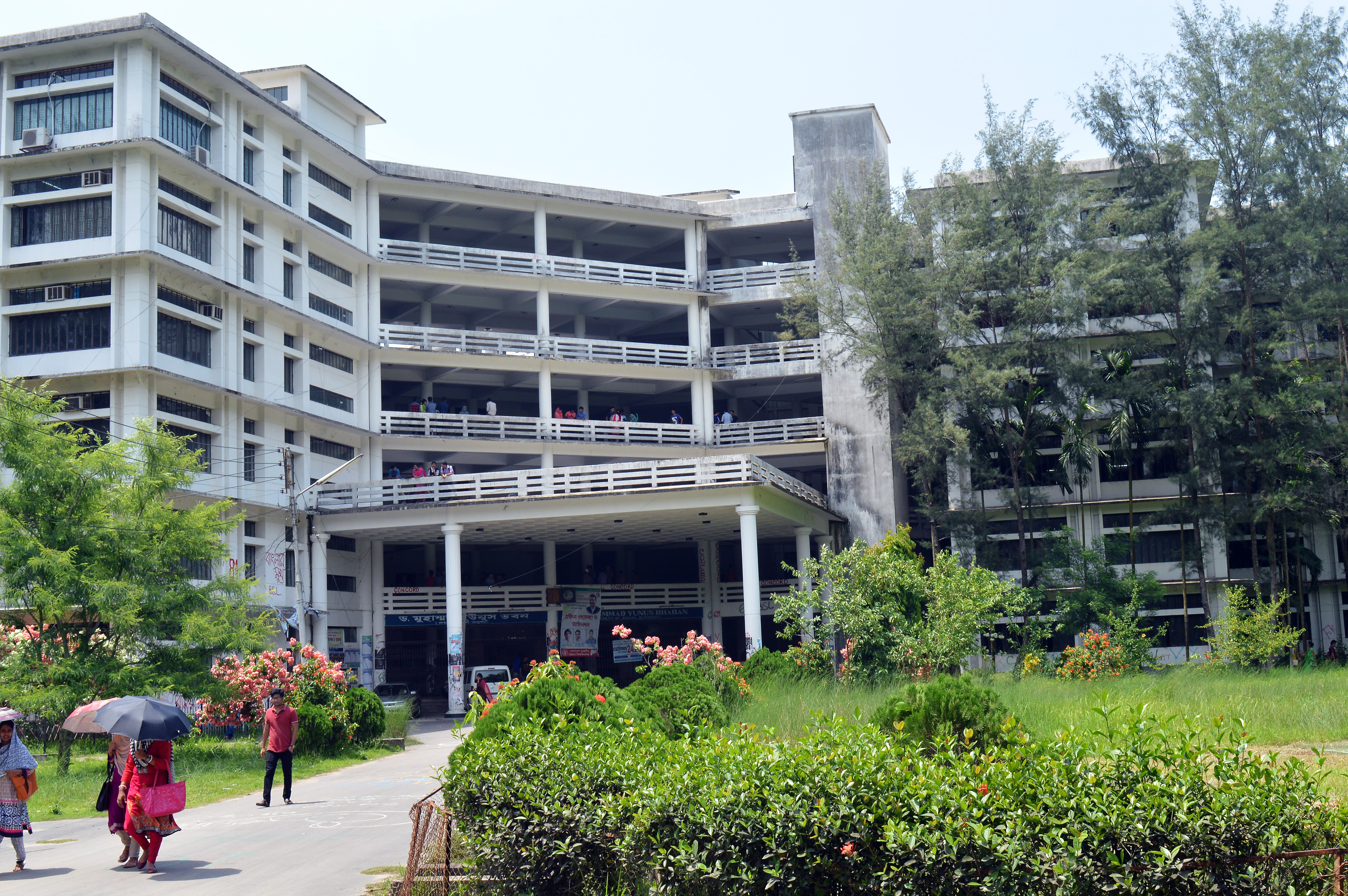

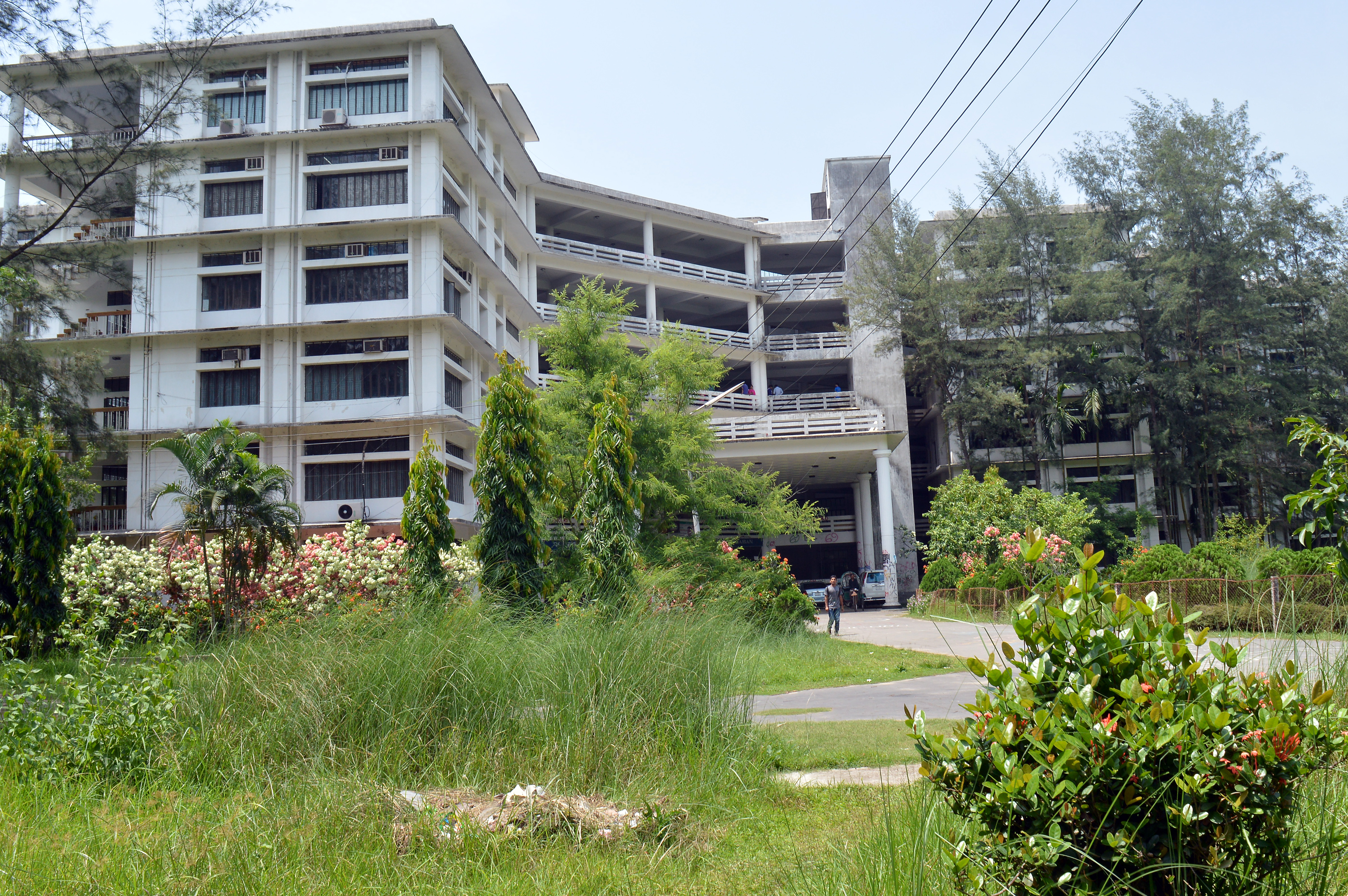

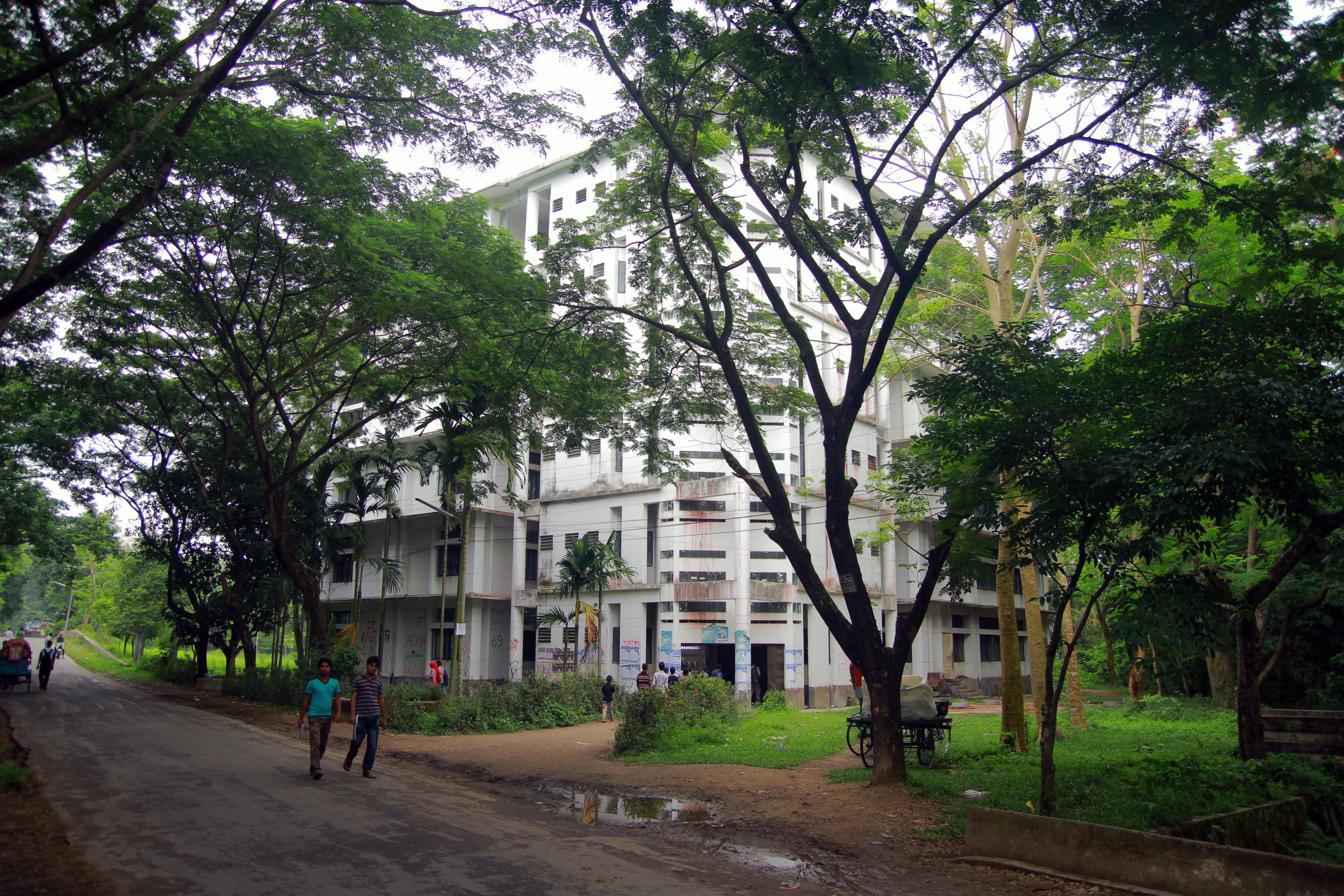

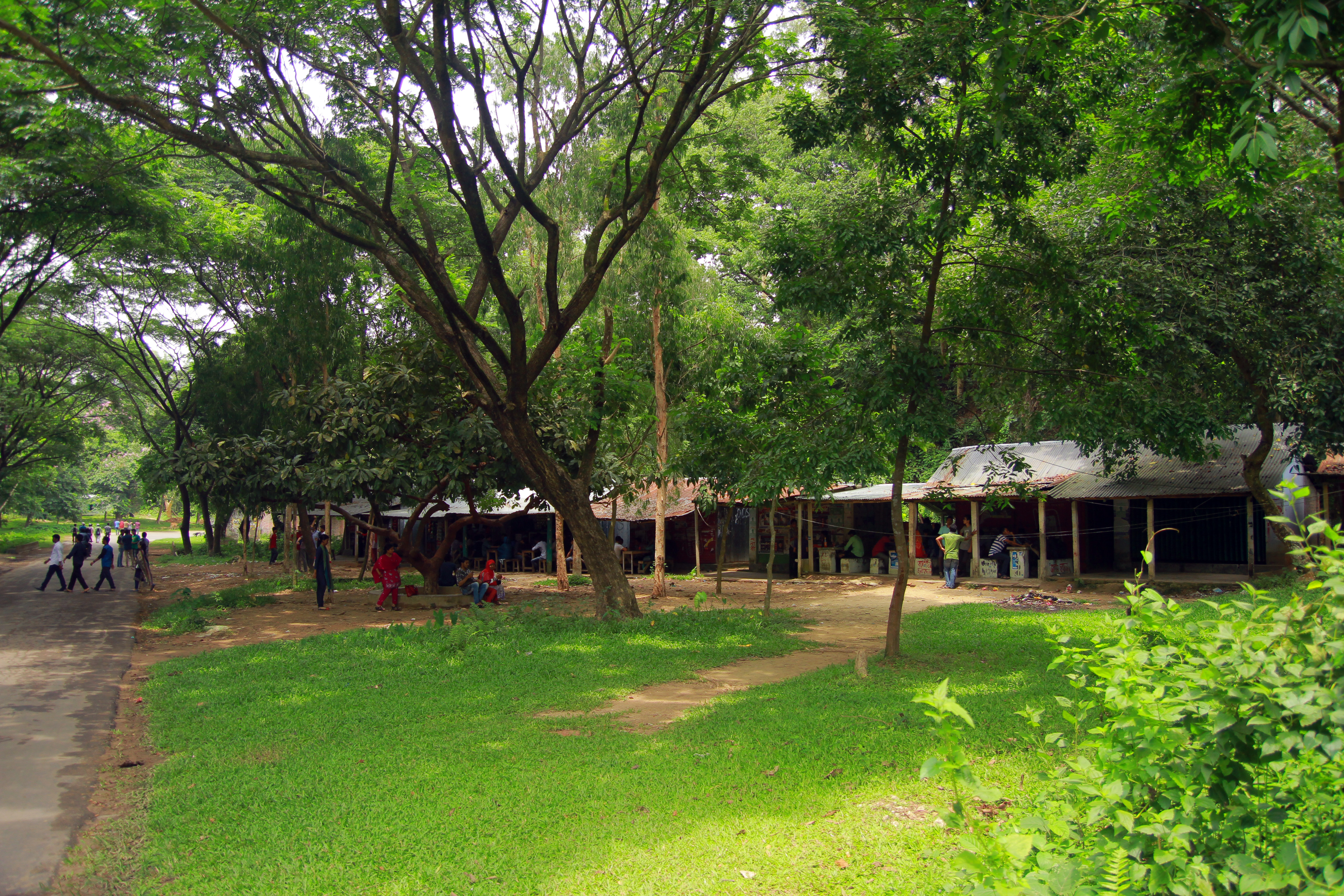
Shack, Social Sciences

=== Faculty of Engineering ===
Faculty of Engineering
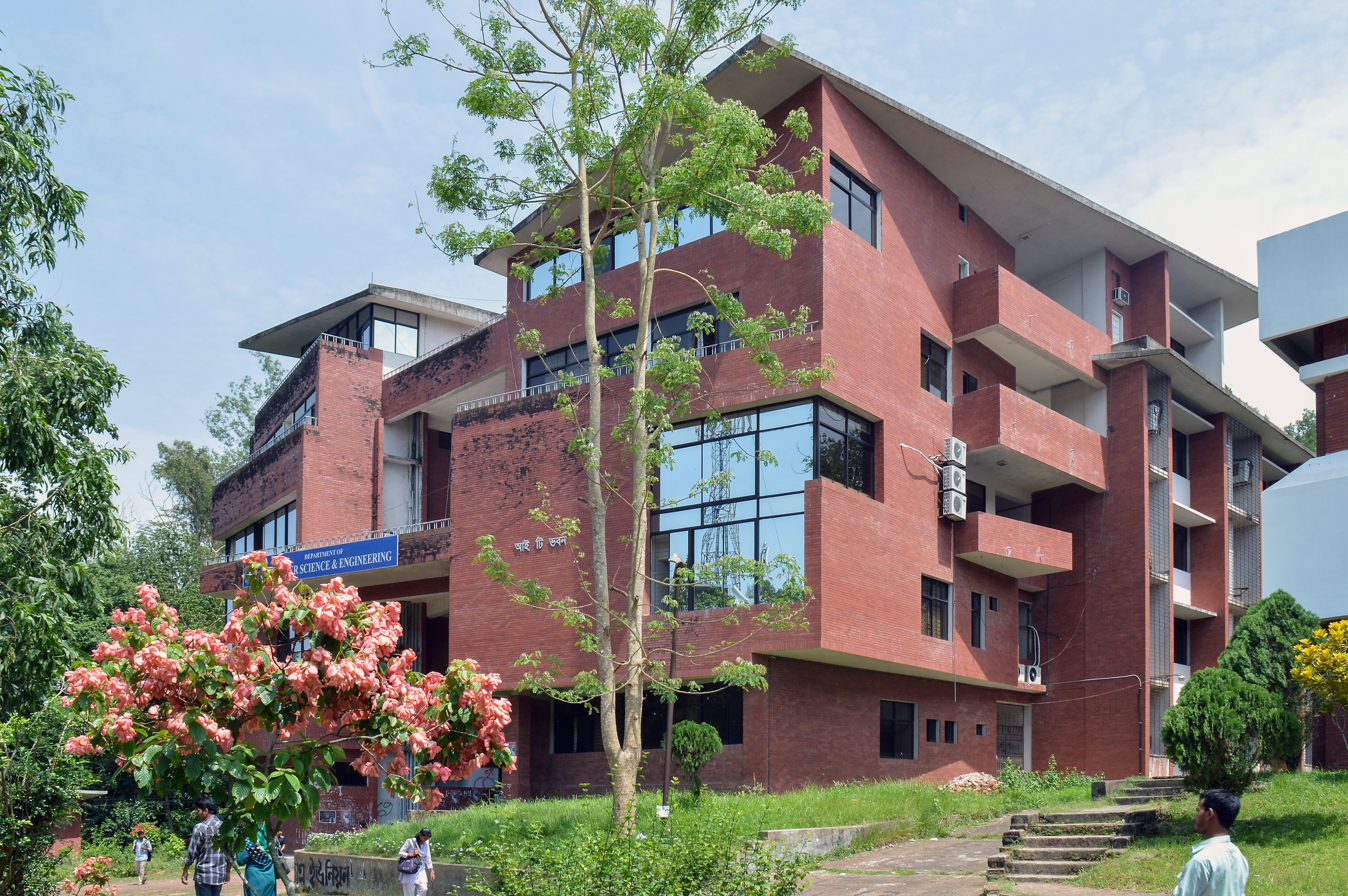
- Faculty of Engineering Building
- Type: Autonomous
- Established: 2001
- Parent institution: University of Chittagong
- Location: University of Chittagong Road, Hathazari, Chittagong, Bangladesh

The Faculty of Engineering is located between the university's Central Shaheed Minar and the library. The faculty currently has 33 academic staff members.

==== Departments ====
Department of Computer Science and Engineering

The department began its academic activities in 2001 to offer undergraduate and postgraduate education in Computer Science and Engineering. Initially, it was launched as the "Department of Computer Science," but later renamed to its current title. Until 2004, due to the absence of a dedicated building, the department operated from the Science and Business Administration faculty buildings. From the 2004–2005 academic session, it moved to the current Engineering Faculty building. The department currently has 24 faculty members and 70 available seats.

Department of Electrical and Electronic Engineering

The department offers undergraduate and postgraduate programs in Applied Physics, Electronics, and Communication Engineering. Initially, in September 2001 – 2002, it began as the Department of Applied Physics and Electronics with just 13 students. Due to the growing importance of electronics and telecommunications education in Bangladesh, the department gradually introduced advanced modern courses. In 2006, it was renamed to “Applied Physics, Electronics, and Communication Engineering,” and in 2012, the B.Sc. Engineering program was launched. In 2017, the department's name was changed to “Electrical and Electronic Engineering.” It currently has 22 faculty members and an intake of 50 students.

==== Affiliated Institute ====
- Chittagong Institute of Engineering and Technology (CIET)

==== Faculty of Engineering Gallery ====
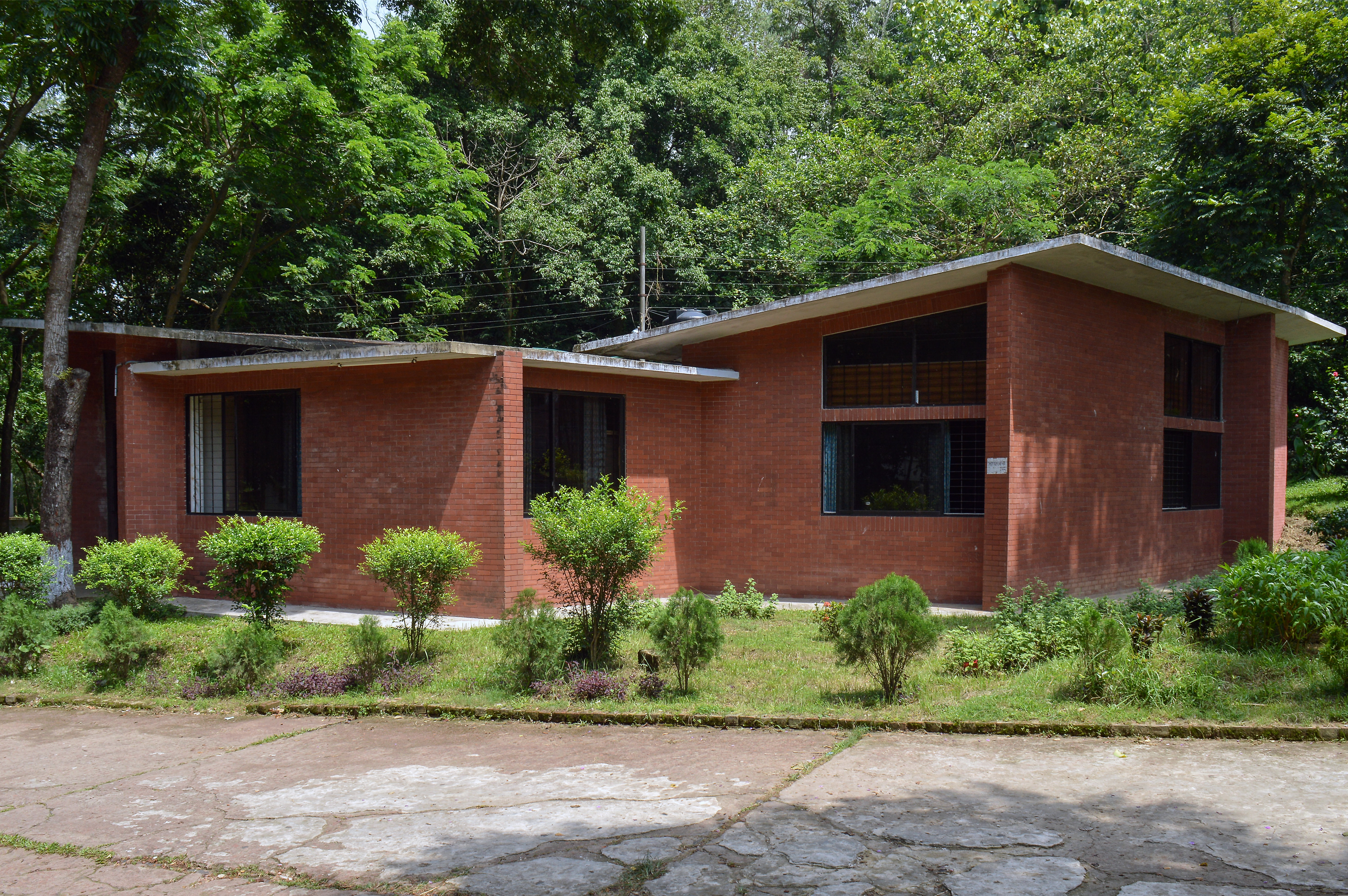
Dean's Building, Department of Computer Science and Engineering

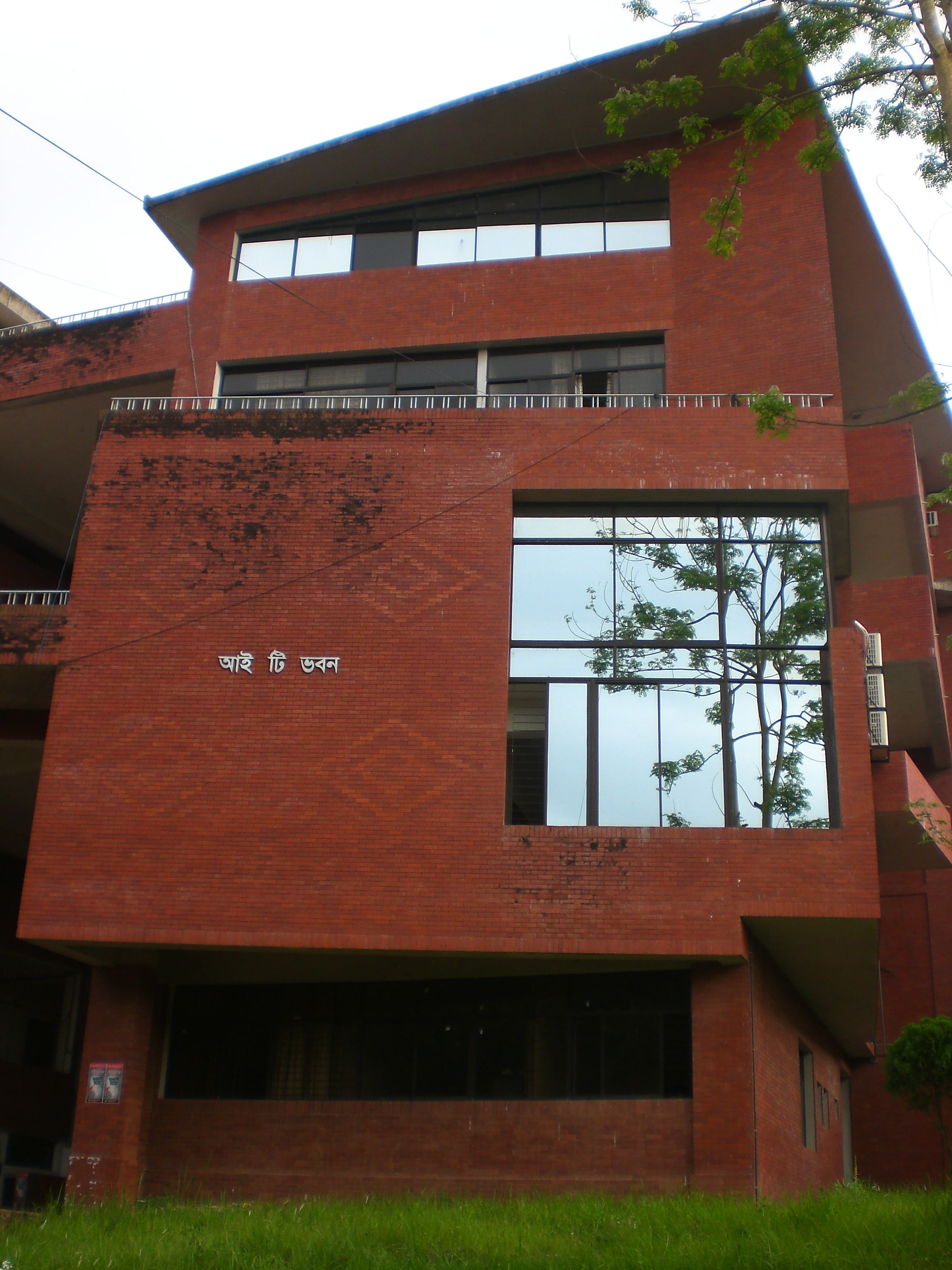
IT Building

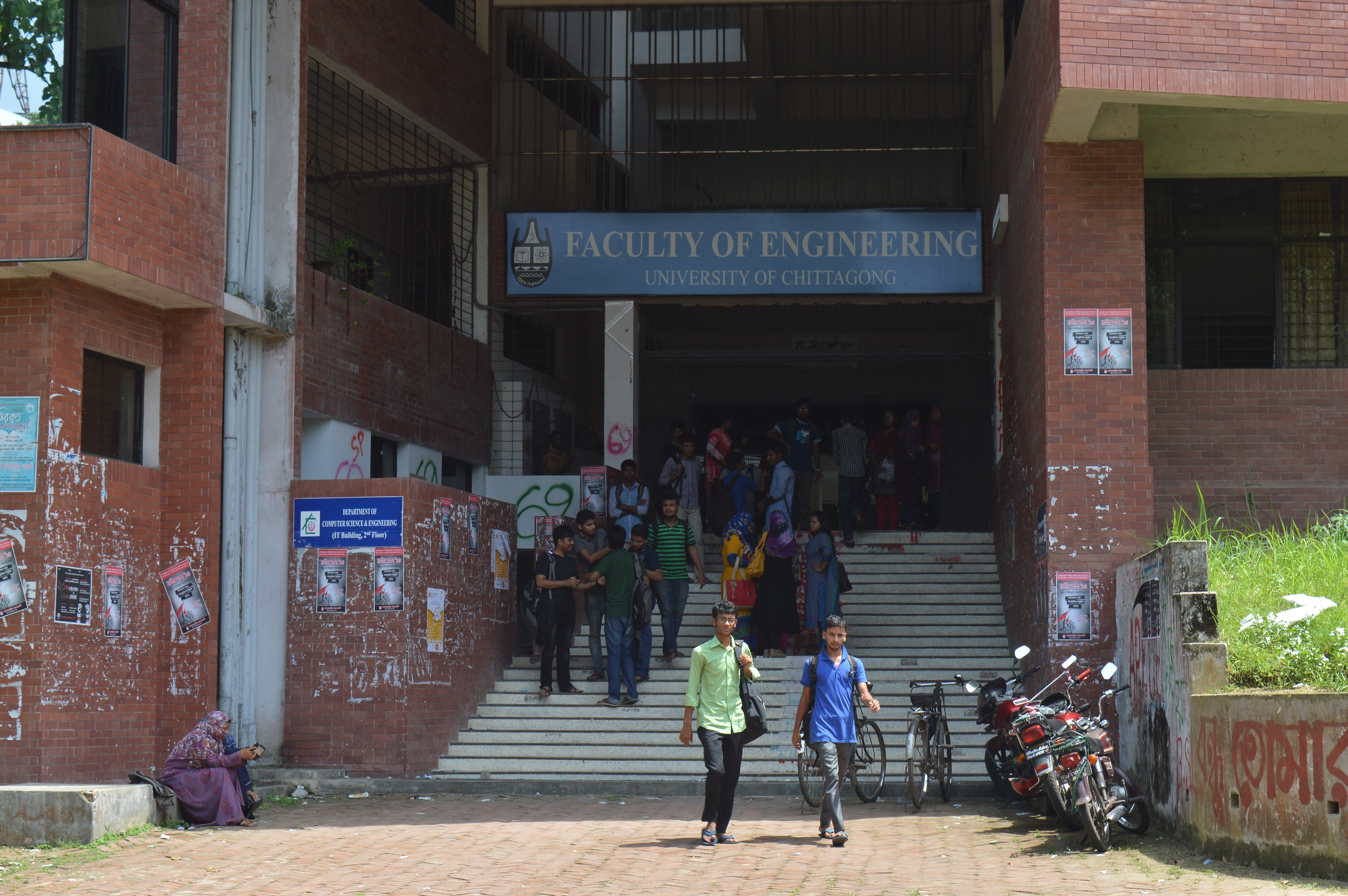
Faculty of Engineering

=== Faculty of Biological Sciences ===
Faculty of Biological Sciences
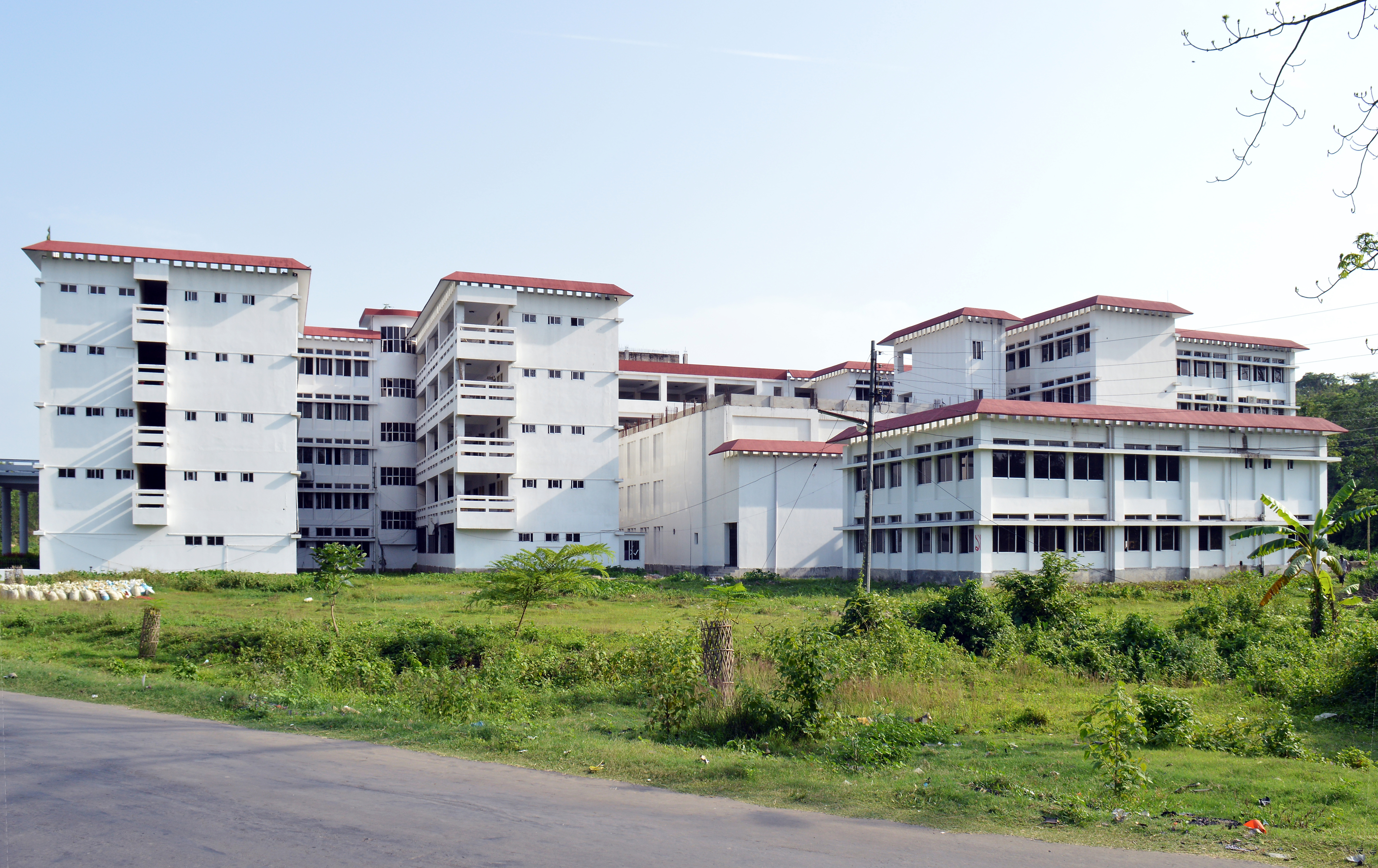
- Faculty of Biological Sciences Building
- Type: Autonomous
- Parent institution: University of Chittagong
- Academic staff: 103
- Location: University of Chittagong Road, Hathazari, Chittagong, Bangladesh

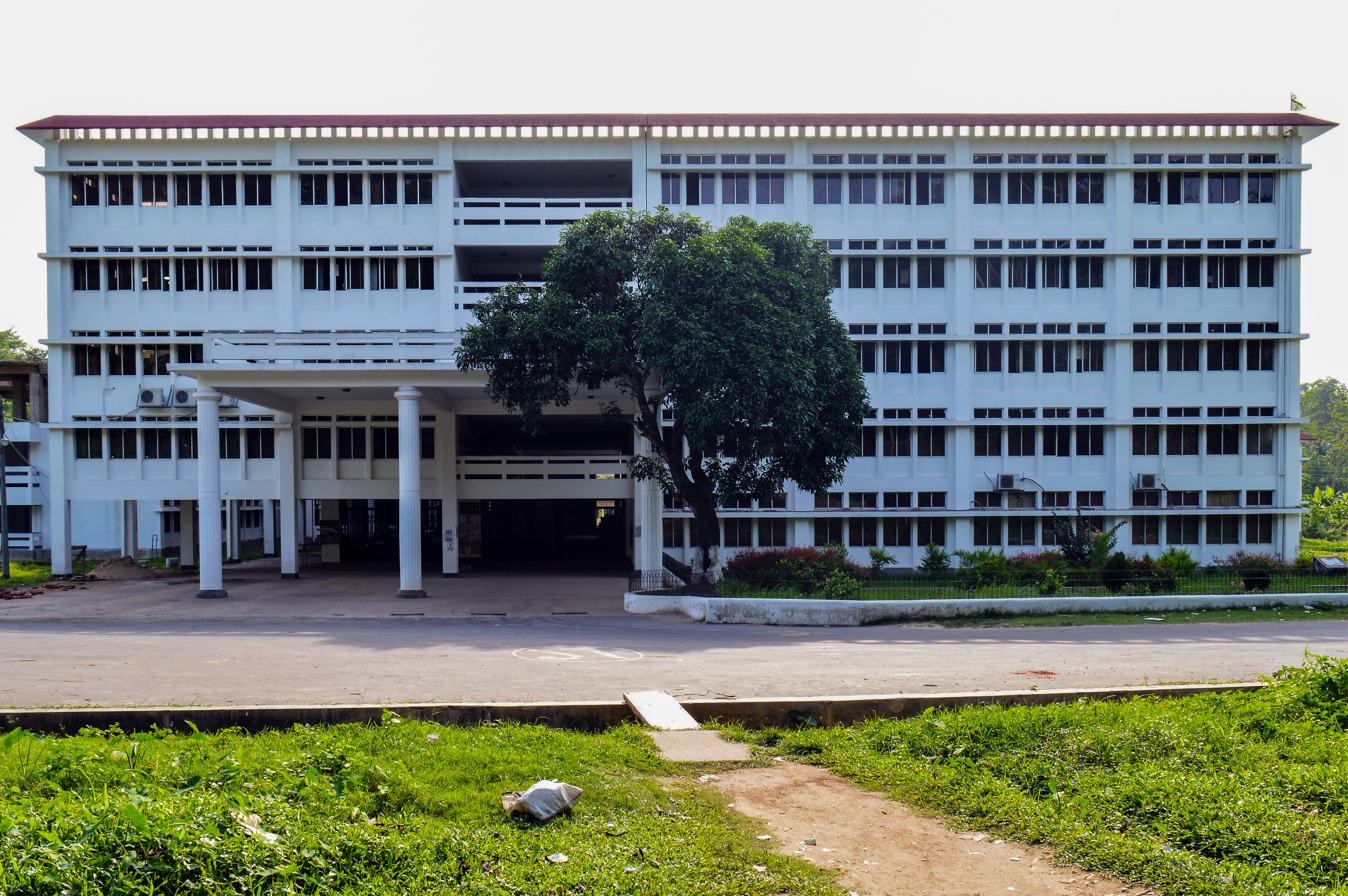
A block of the Faculty of Biological Sciences

The faculty began its academic activities to offer undergraduate and postgraduate programs in biological sciences. It currently has 103 faculty members.

Departments	Established	Faculty Members	Number of Seats
Department of Zoology	1973		
Department of Botany	1973	24	
Department of Geography and Environmental Studies	4 June 1996	19	300
Department of Biochemistry and Molecular Biology		23	
Department of Microbiology			
Department of Soil Science		23	
Department of Genetic Engineering and Biotechnology	2004	16	
Department of Psychology		11	
Department of Pharmacy		8	

==== Departments ====
Department of Zoology

The department began its academic activities in 1973 under the leadership of Shafiq Haider Chowdhury to offer undergraduate and postgraduate education in Zoology. It is located on the west wing of the third floor of the Faculty of Science building. The current (14th) chairman is Mohammad Ismail Mia. The department currently has 24 faculty members.

It has a seminar library with 4,000 books and a collection of 380 scientific journals and periodicals. Additionally, the department hosts a Zoology Museum, established in 1973 as a supporting facility for the academic curriculum. The museum preserves around 540 specimens, including 57 animals and 485 wet (formalin-preserved) samples.

Department of Botany

The department currently has 24 faculty members.

Department of Geography and Environmental Studies

This department was established in 1996 and currently has 19 faculty members. It is considered one of the leading centers for geographic education and research in the country. It offers B.Sc., M.Sc., M.Phil., and Ph.D. degrees and engages in research areas like urban development, climate change, environmental management, remote sensing and GIS, disasters, land use, health geography, and water resources. The current (August 2020) chairman is Ali Haider.

Department of Biochemistry and Molecular Biology

This department currently has 23 faculty members.

Department of Microbiology

This department currently has 16 faculty members.

Department of Soil Science

The department currently has 23 faculty members and is located on the second floor of the Biological Sciences building. It was founded by former Dean of the Faculty of Biological Sciences, Khan Tawhid Osman. The current chair is Sabrina Sharmin Alam.

Department of Genetic Engineering and Biotechnology

This department currently has 16 faculty members.

Department of Psychology

This department currently has 11 faculty members. It focuses on educational psychology—a major branch of psychology—which deals with analyzing human behavior related to education and how psychological principles can be applied to solve educational issues. The field intersects with neuroscience and involves educational design, technology, curriculum development, classroom management, and student motivation. It draws contributions from both cognitive science and learning science. Educational psychology departments are usually placed under education faculties in universities, largely due to the subject's relevance in psychology textbooks and educational policy.

Department of Pharmacy

This department currently has 8 faculty members.

==== Faculty of Biological Sciences Gallery ====
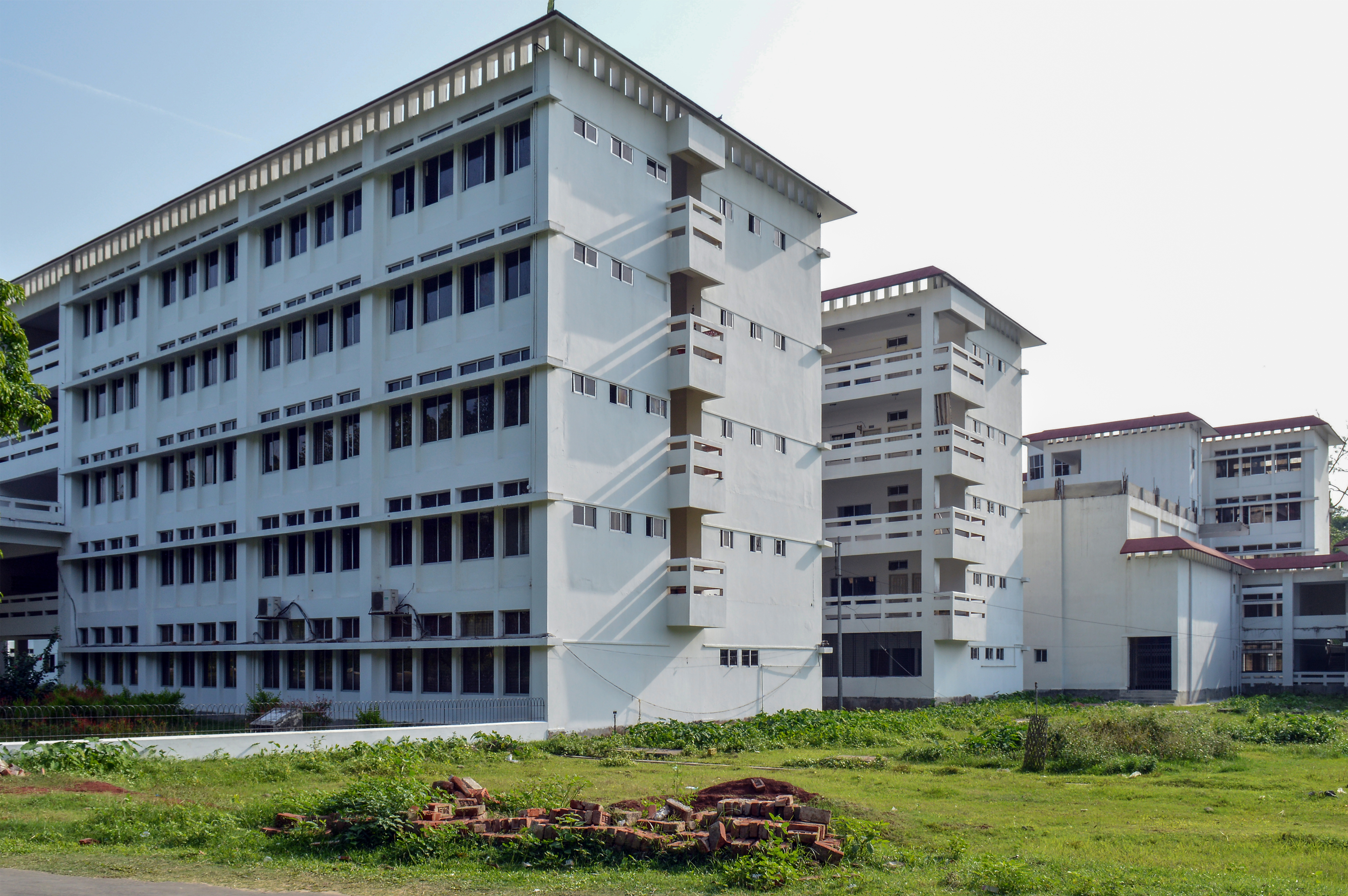

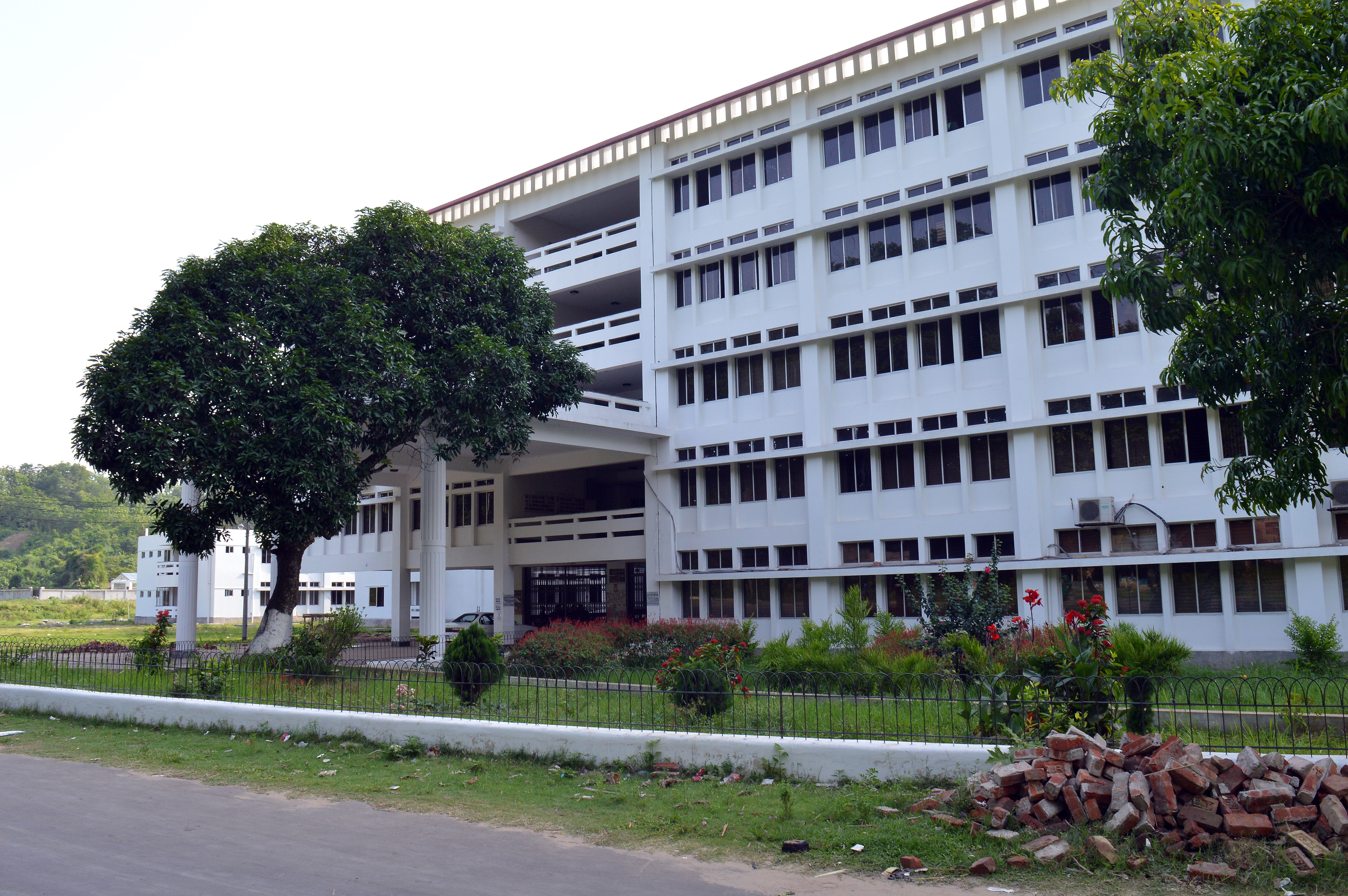

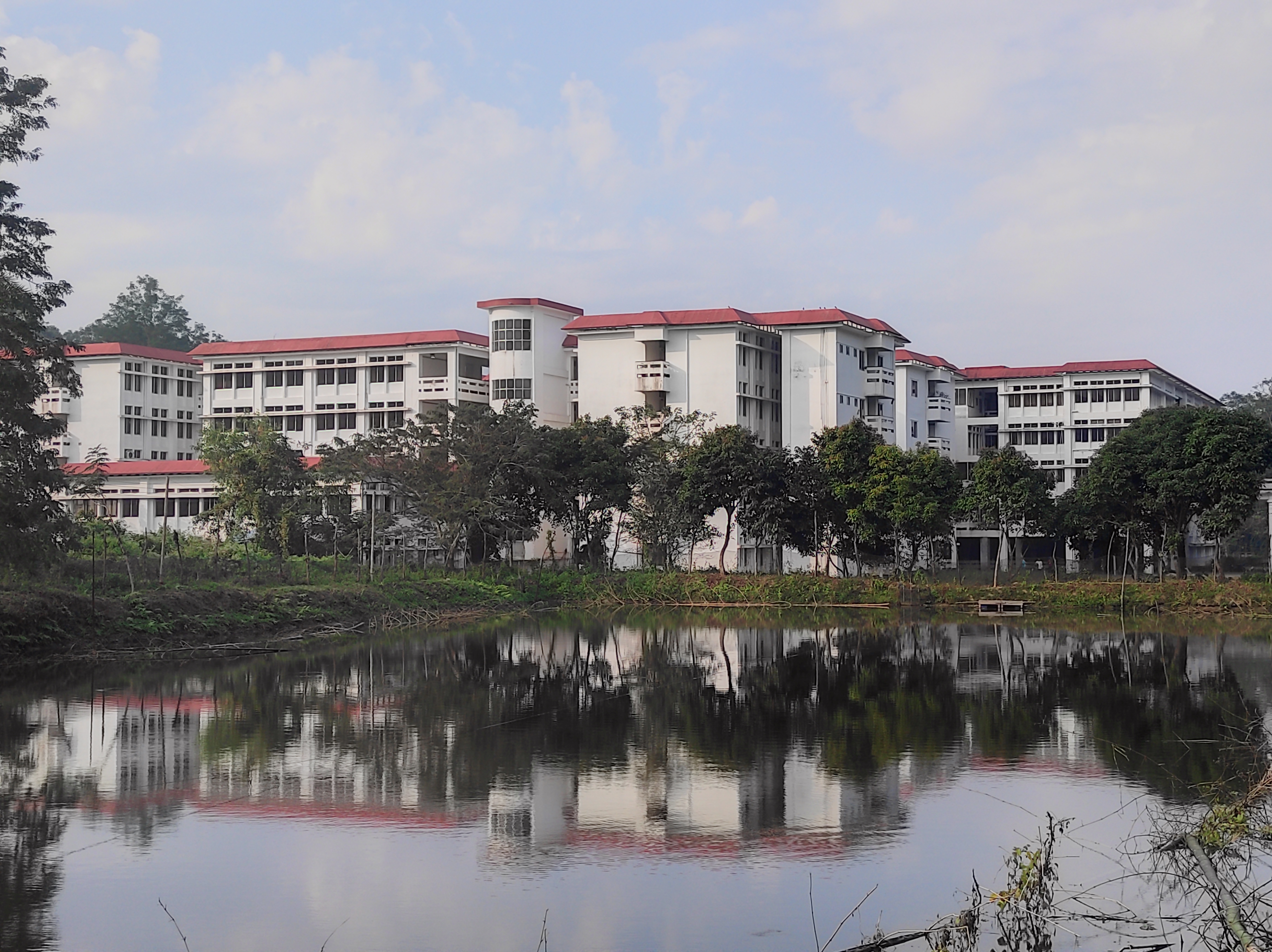

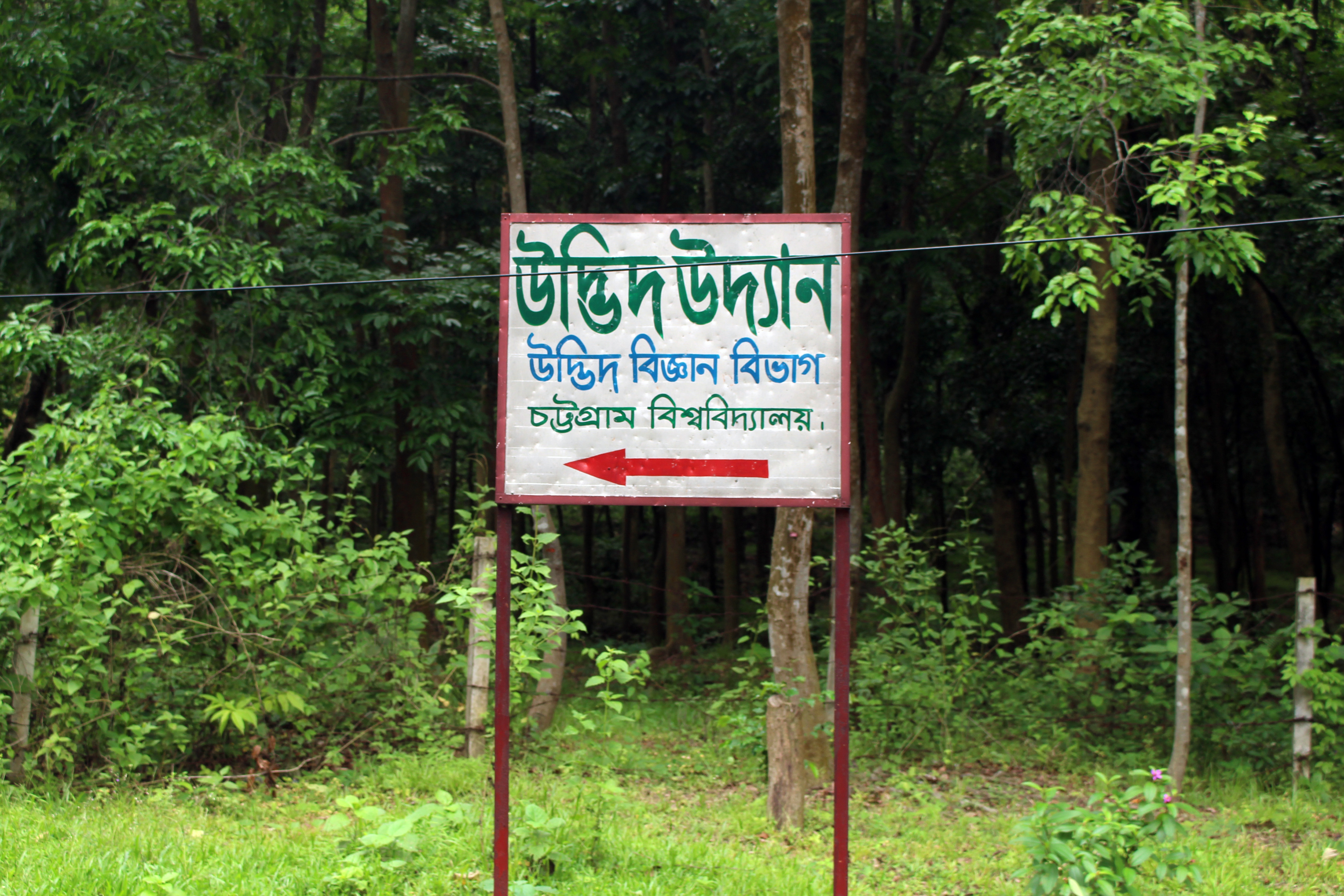

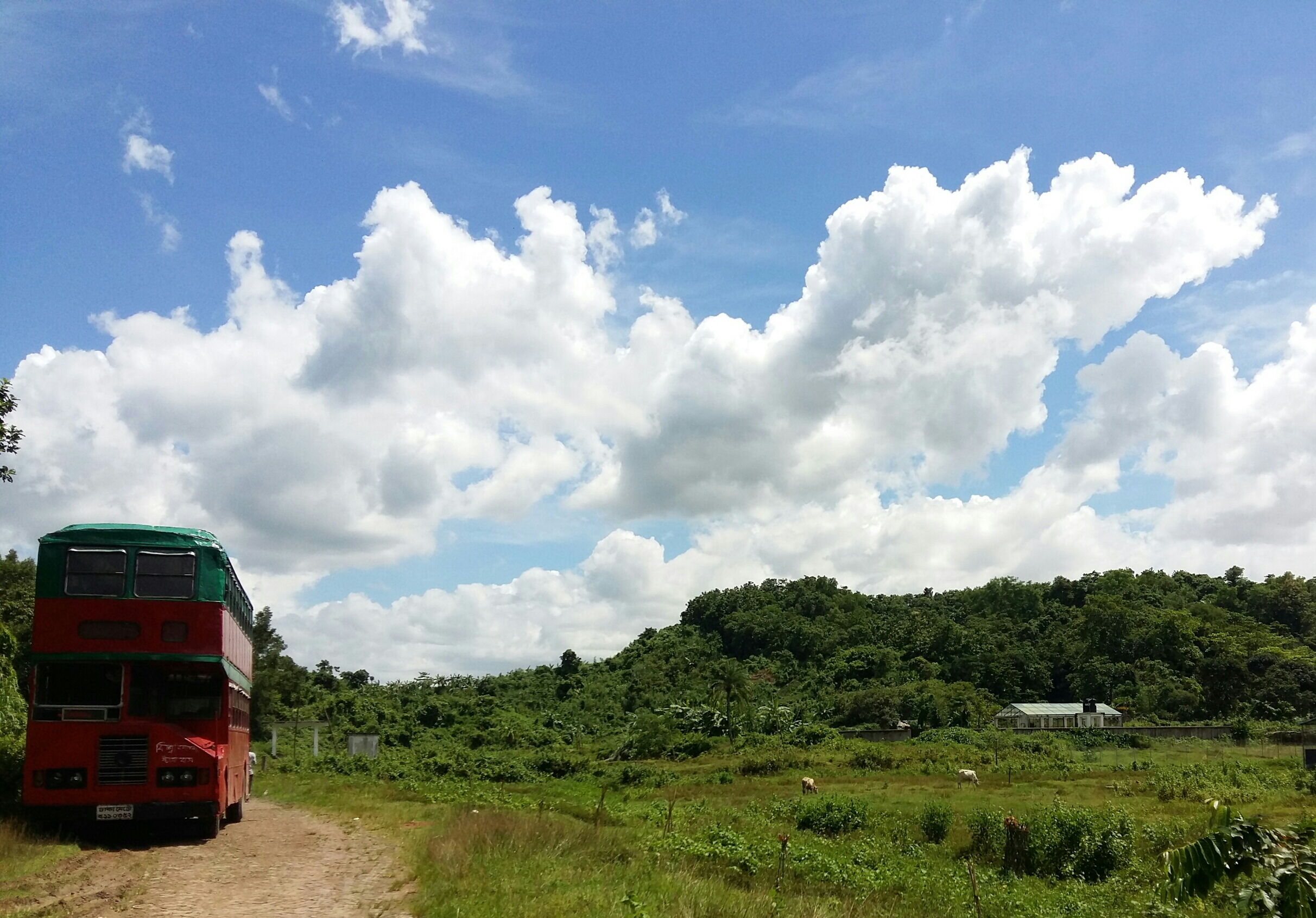

=== Faculty of Education ===
Faculty of Education
- Type: Autonomous
- Parent institution: University of Chittagong
- Location: University of Chittagong Road, Hathazari, Chittagong, Bangladesh

==== Departments ====
Department of Physical Education and Sports Science

==== Institute ====
Institute of Education and Research

=== Faculty of Medicine ===
Departments	Faculty Members	Number of Seats
Department of Pediatrics		
Department of Community Ophthalmology		

=== Faculty of Marine Sciences and Fisheries ===
Departments	Faculty Members	Number of Seats
Department of Marine Science		
Department of Oceanography		
Department of Fisheries		

== Institutes ==
- Institute of Education and Research
- Institute of Fine Arts
- Institute of Modern Languages
- Institute of Community Ophthalmology
- Institute of Forestry and Environmental Sciences
- Institute of Marine Sciences and Fisheries
- Institute of Social Science Research

Institute of Fine Arts

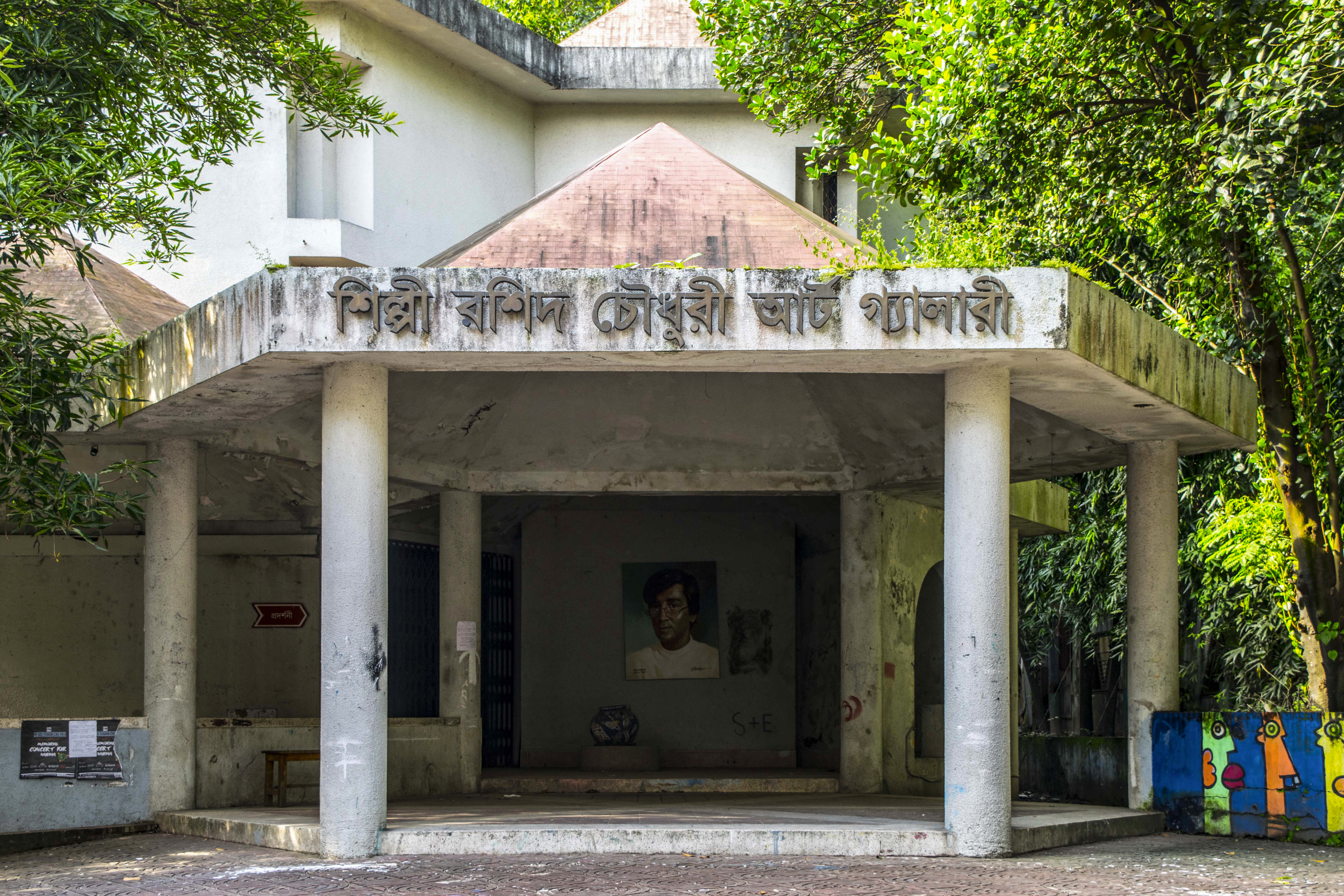
Artist Rashid Choudhury Art Gallery at the Institute of Fine Arts

The Institute of Fine Arts is one of the constituent institutes under the Faculty of Arts and Humanities at the University of Chittagong. It is located on Badshah Mia Chowdhury Road in Chittagong. It is the only institute situated outside the main university campus. The institute currently has 30 faculty members and a total of 70 seats.

Institute of Modern Languages

The Institute of Modern Languages is one of the institutes under the Faculty of Arts and Humanities at the University of Chittagong. It was established in 2008 to provide education in various foreign languages. The institute is located in the Dr. Abdul Karim Building under the Faculty of Arts and Humanities. It currently has 21 instructors. There are 45 seats in the Honours program, and over 700 seats for language certificate courses. Certificate and diploma degrees are offered in seven different languages.

Linguistics: An Honours program in Linguistics was introduced under this institute in the 2012–13 academic session. The curriculum includes courses in phonetics, morphology, semantics, syntax, and applied linguistics, such as sociolinguistics, computational linguistics, clinical linguistics, language disorders, sign language, as well as basic Bengali and English. Additionally, a foreign language is taught as a third language in one of the academic years.

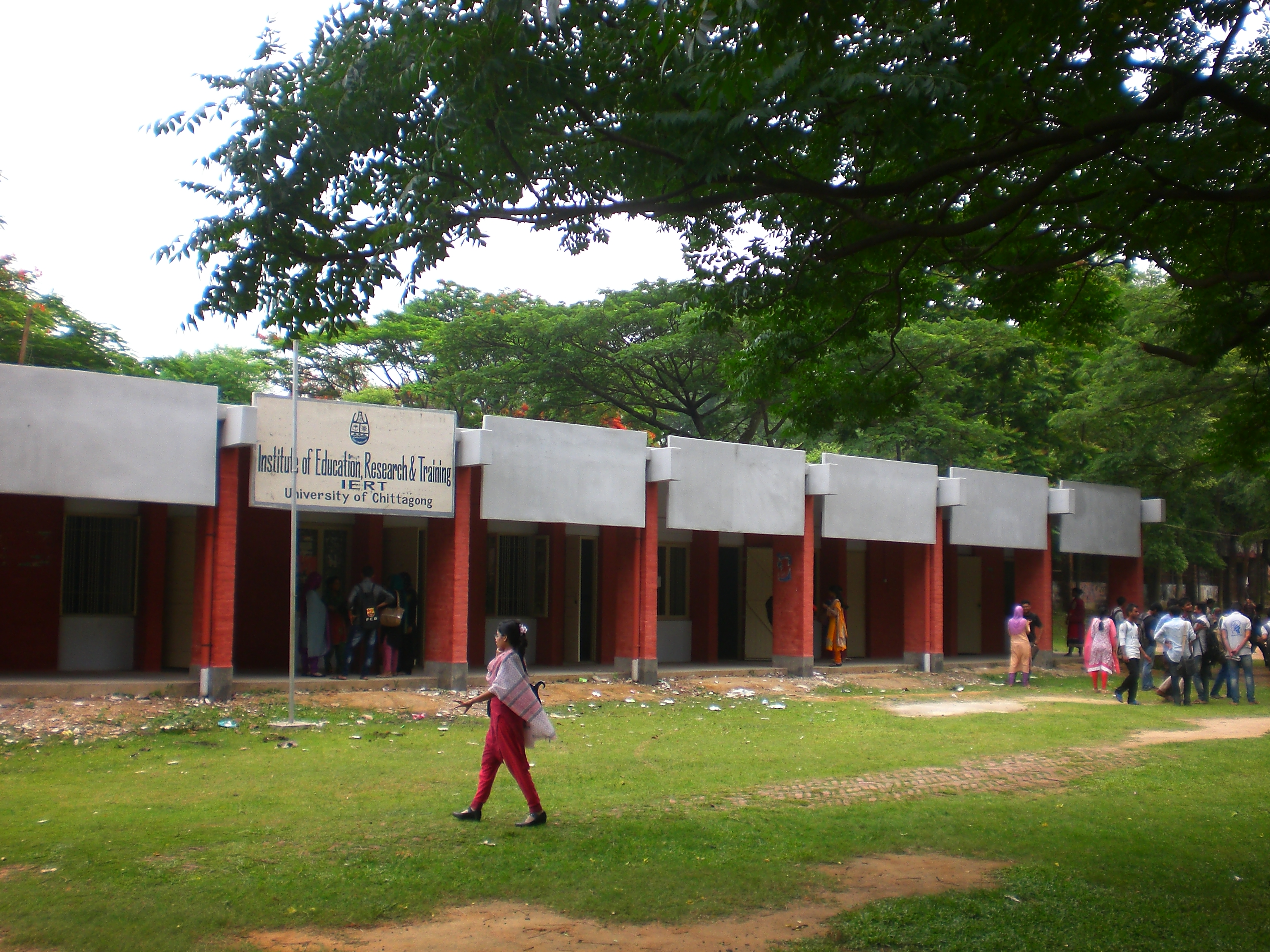
Institute of Education and Research

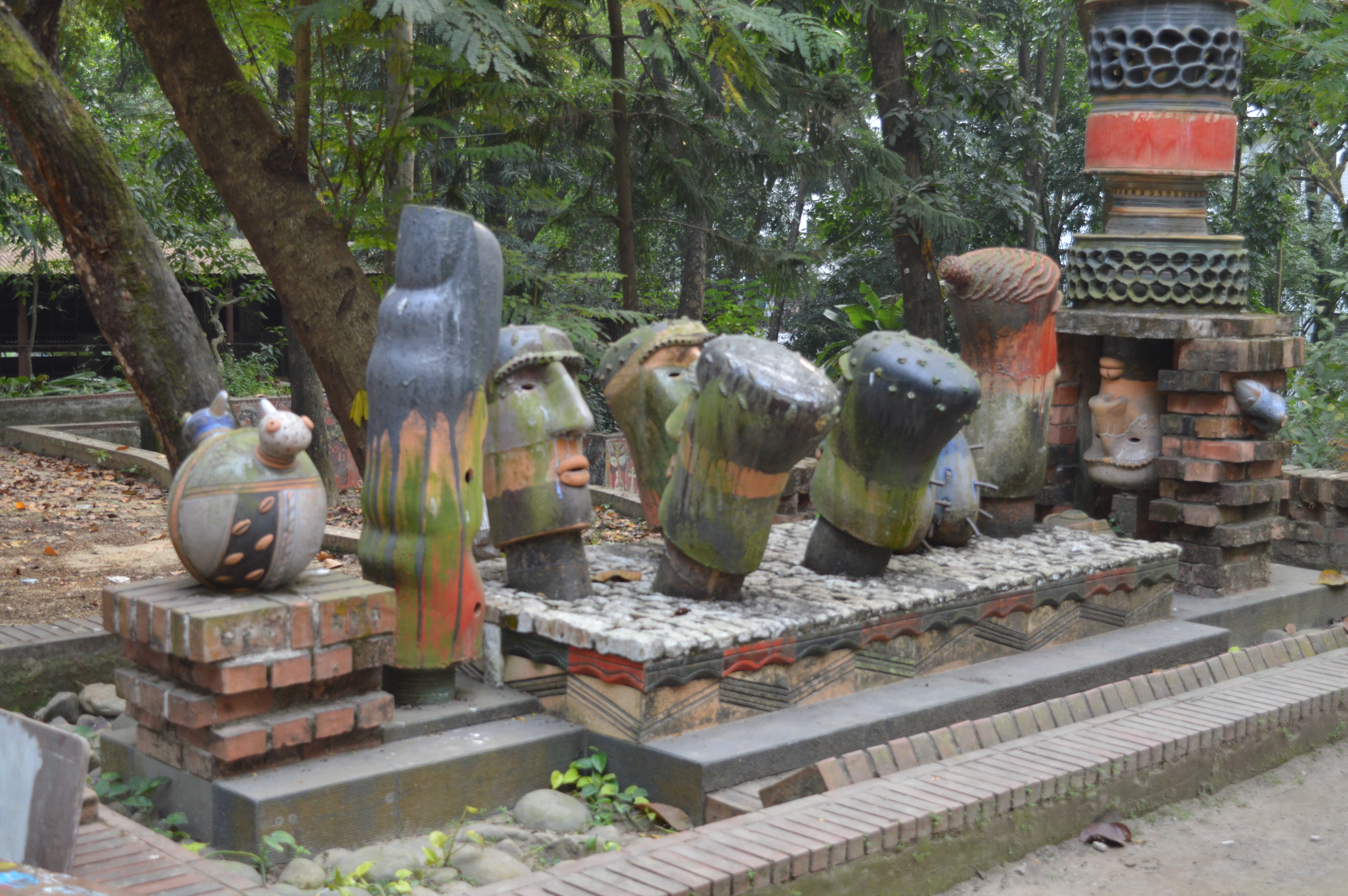
Sculpture, Institute of Fine Arts

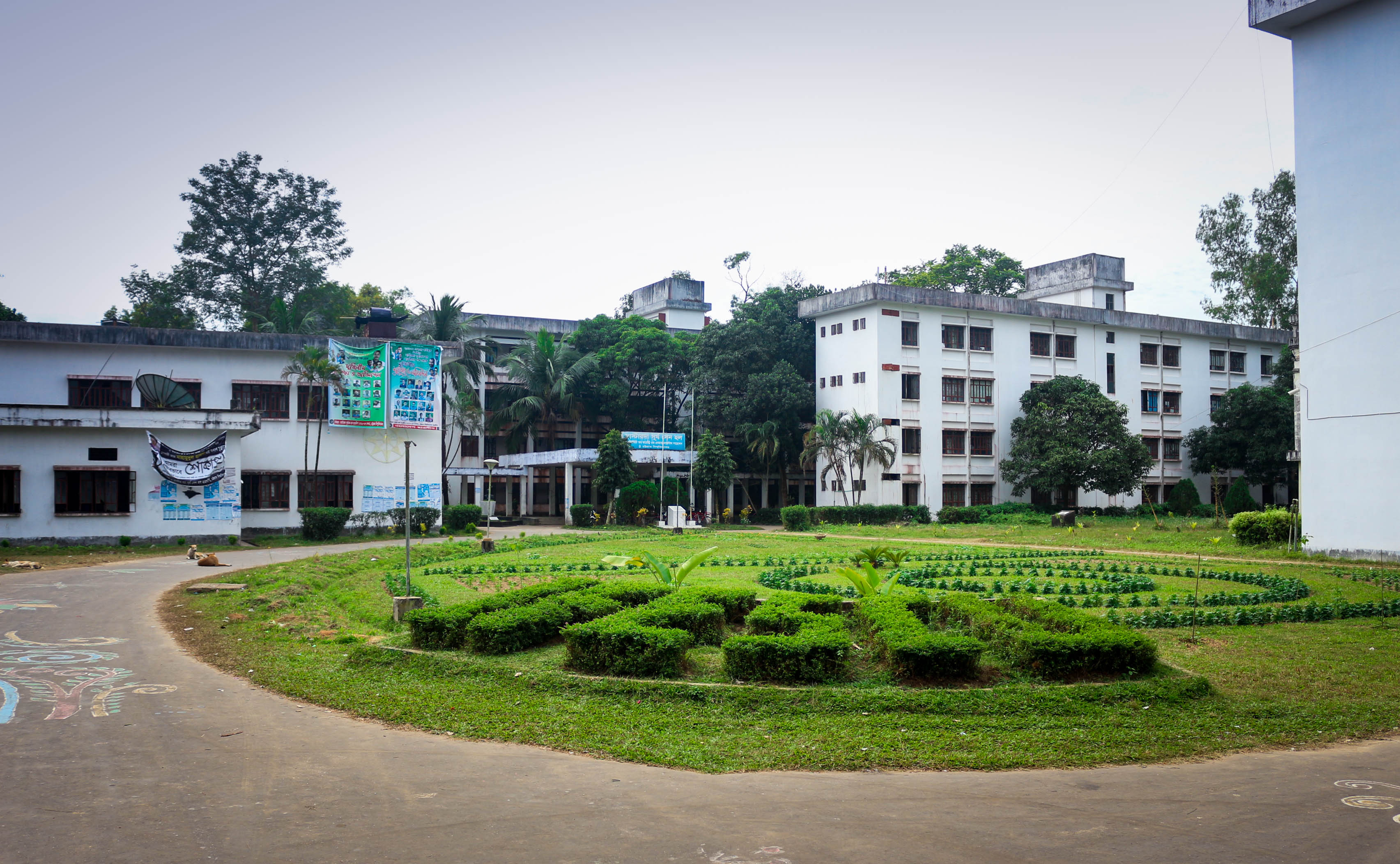
Institute of Forestry and Environmental Sciences

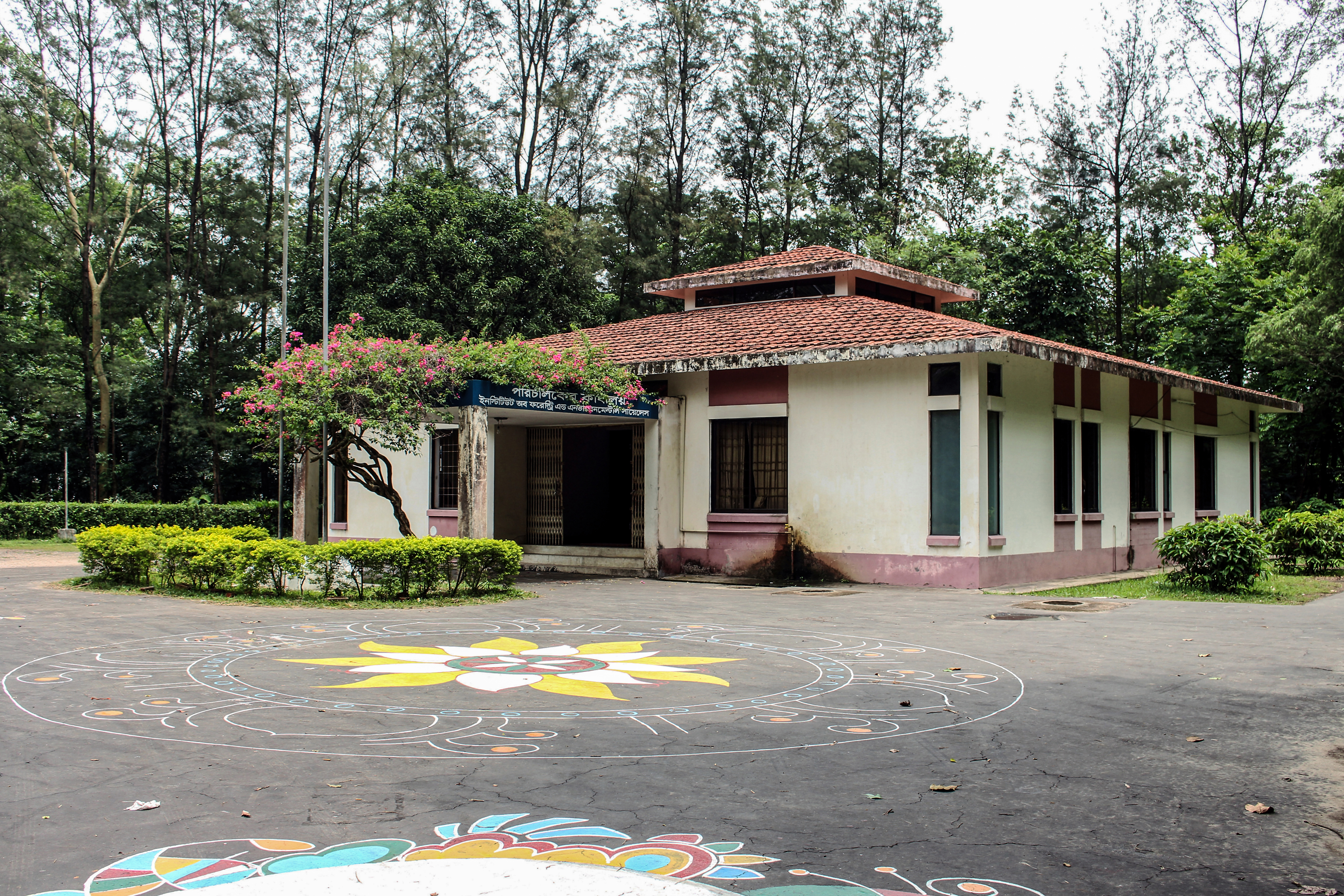
Director's Office, Forestry and Environmental Sciences

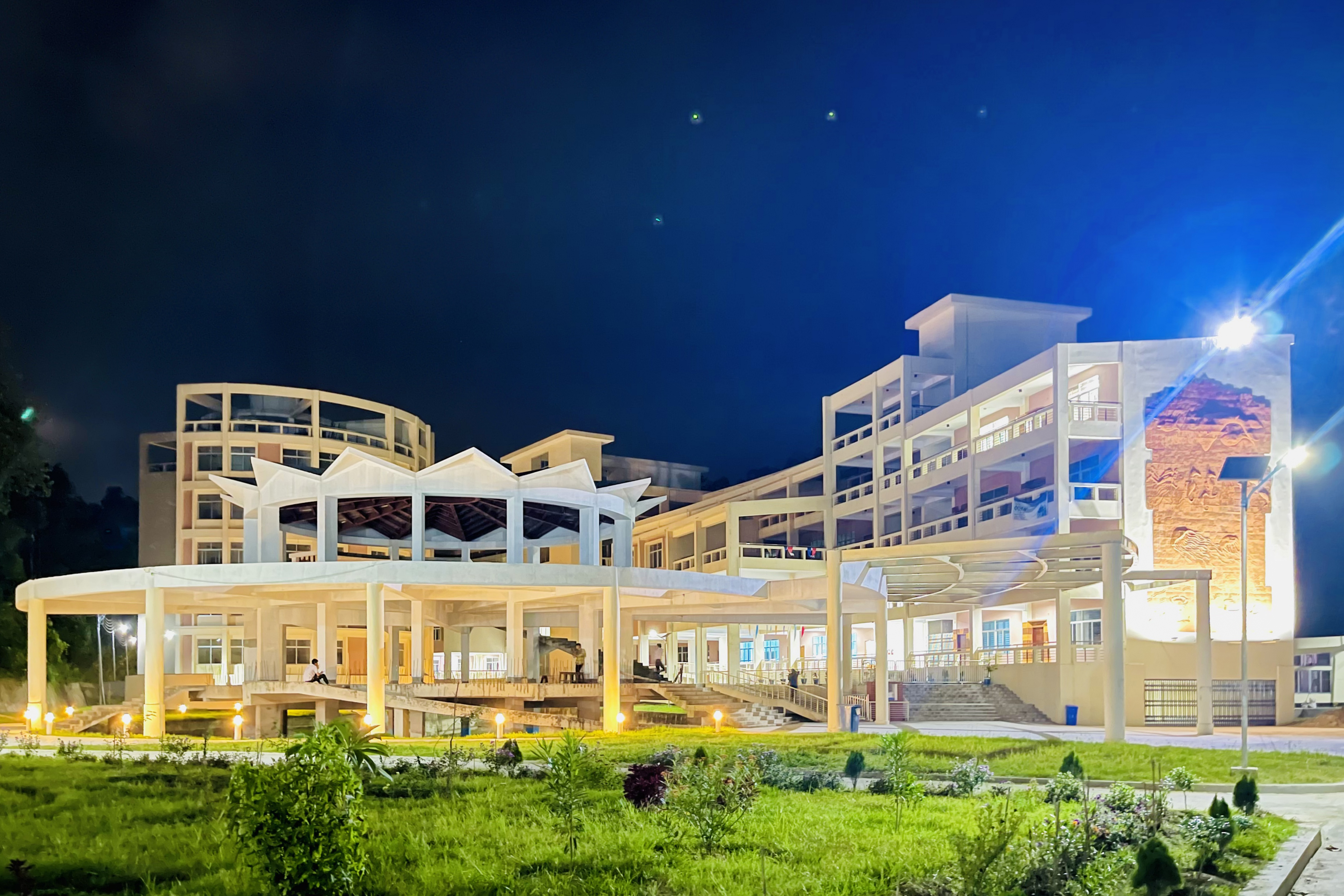
Institute of Marine Sciences and Fisheries
