= Abu Yousuf =

Abu Yusuf

14th Vice-Chancellor of the University of Chittagong
- In office 25 February 2009 – 28 November 2010
- Preceded by: Badiul Alam
- Succeeded by: Mohammad Alauddin (acting)

Personal details
- Born: 1943 Chittagong District, Bengal, British India
- Died: November 2010 (aged 66–67) Chittagong, Bangladesh
- Education: Jawaharlal Nehru University

Abu Yusuf (1943 – 28 November 2010) was a Bangladeshi academic and veteran of the Bangladesh Liberation War. He served as the 14th vice-chancellor of the University of Chittagong and was a professor in the Department of Islamic History and Culture at the same institution.

== Early life and education ==
Yusuf was born in 1943 in present-day West Dhalai, Hathazari Upazila, Chittagong District. He completed his master's degree in history from the University of Chittagong. He later obtained his MPhil and PhD in history from Jawaharlal Nehru University in India.

== Career ==
Yusuf joined the University of Chittagong in 1973 as a faculty member in the Department of Islamic History and Culture, where he served for several decades.

A veteran of the Bangladesh Liberation War, Yusuf also served as pro vice-chancellor of the University of Chittagong from 1996 to 2001. He was appointed as the university's 14th vice-chancellor on 25 February 2009 and served until his death in November 2010. He talked about ending violence between students and holding an election to the Chittagong University Central Students Union. Three students died during his tenure due to campus violence. Yusuf received death threats himself.

During Yusuf's tenure, he took initiatives to reduce session jams and streamline academic operations, earning respect within the university community.

== Death ==
Yusuf died of cardiac arrest on 28 November 2010 at Chittagong Medical College Hospital.
