= Abul Fazal (writer) =

Bangladeshi writer and academic

Minister of Education
- In office 26 November 1975 – 22 June 1977
- Preceded by: Ziaur Rahman
- Succeeded by: Syed Ali Ahsan

Vice-chancellor of University of Chittagong
- In office 9 April 1973 – 27 November 1975
- Preceded by: M Innas Ali
- Succeeded by: Abdul Karim

Personal details
- Born: 1 July 1903 Satkania, Chittagong, Bengal Presidency, British India
- Died: 4 May 1983 (aged 79) Chittagong, Bangladesh
- Children: Abul Momen
- Education: MS (Bengali Literature)
- Alma mater: University of Dhaka; Calcutta University
- Occupation: educationist, writer
- Awards: full list

Abul Fazal (1 July 1903–4 May 1983) was a Bangladeshi writer and academic. He served as the 4th vice-chancellor of the University of Chittagong. He was awarded the Bangla Academy Literary Award in 1962 and Independence Day Award in 2012 (posthumously).

== Biography ==
Fazal was born at Satkania Upazila in Chittagong District in 1903 to Moulvi Fazlur Rahman, an Imam of Chittagong Jame Masjid. Fazal earned a B.A. from the University of Dhaka in 1928.

He began his career as an imam. He taught in multiple schools as a teacher. He married Umratul Alam in 1938. Together they would have five sons and one daughter.

Fazal passed his M.A. in Bengali language and literature from Calcutta University in 1940. In 1941, he became a professor at Krishnanagar College and later at Chittagong College. He served as the vice-chancellor of the University of Chittagong from 1973 to 1975.

Fazal served as a member in charge of education and culture of the advisory council of the Government of Bangladesh during 1975–23 June 1977.

== Works ==
Fazal wrote in a variety of genres: novels, short stories, plays, memoirs, travels etc. He also wrote about religion. Some of his writings include Matir Prthibi (1940), Bichitra Katha (1940), Rekhachitra (1966) and Durdiner Dinlipi (1972).

=== Novels ===
- Chouchir (Splintered, 1934)
- Prodip O Patongo (Torch and Insects, 1940)
- Ranga Probhat (The Crimson Dawn, 1957)
- Khuda O Asha (Hunger and Hope, 1964).

== Awards ==
- Bangla Academy Literary Award (1962)
- President's National Award (1966)
- Adamjee Literary Award (1966)
- Honorary Doctorate from the University of Dhaka (1974)
- The Nasiruddin Gold Medal (1980)
- The Muktadhara Literary Award (1981)
- The Abdul Hai Literary Award (1982)
- Independence Day Award (2012)
