= Abdul Karim (historian) =

Dr. Abdul Karim

Vice Chancellor of University of Chittagong
- In office 28 November 1975 – 18 April 1981
- Preceded by: Abul Fazal
- Succeeded by: M. A. Aziz Khan

Personal details
- Born: c. 1928
- Died: 24 July 2007 (aged 79) Panchlaish, Chittagong, Bangladesh
- Occupation: historian, university academic

Abdul Karim (c. 1928 – 24 July 2007) was a Bangladeshi historian. He served as the 5th vice-chancellor of the University of Chittagong. He was awarded Ekushey Padak in 1995 by the government of Bangladesh. He was best known for his works on medieval and early modern Bangladeshi and South Asian history.

== Early life ==
Abdul Karim was born on 1 June 1928 at the village Chanpachari, Banskhali of Chittagong. His father is Syed Waijuddin and mother is Rashida Khatun. He is the youngest of 3 brothers and 1 sister. In 1944, he passed his High Madrasa Examination and in 1946 his Intermediate Arts Examination. He completed his BA at University of Dhaka in 1949 and his masters in 1950.

== Career ==
Abdul Karim joined the University of Dhaka as a lecturer in 1951. He was mentored by Ahmad Hasan Dani. He later went to the UK to earn his Ph.D. and finished it in 1958. His dissertation topic was Social History of the Muslims in Bengal. He completed a second PhD at the School of Oriental and African Studies, University of London. In 1966, he joined Chittagong University as chairman of the Department of History. He retired from the university in 1986. He joined the Institute for Bangladesh Studies of the University of Rajshahi as a senior fellow and in 2001 was made professor emeritus.

== Death ==
Abdul Karim died in Chittagong on 24 July 2007.

== Selected bibliography ==
- Corpus of the Muslim Coins of Bengal
- Corpus of the Arabic and Persian Inscriptions of Bengal
- History of Bengal, Mughal Period
- Murshid Quli Khan and His Times
- Dhaka, the Mughal Capital
- The Rohingyas: A Short Account of their History and Culture
- Banglar Itihas
- Social History of the Muslims in Bengal (Down to A.D. 1538)
