= Mohammad Shah Alam (academic) =

Bangladeshi academic and lawyer (1951–2020)

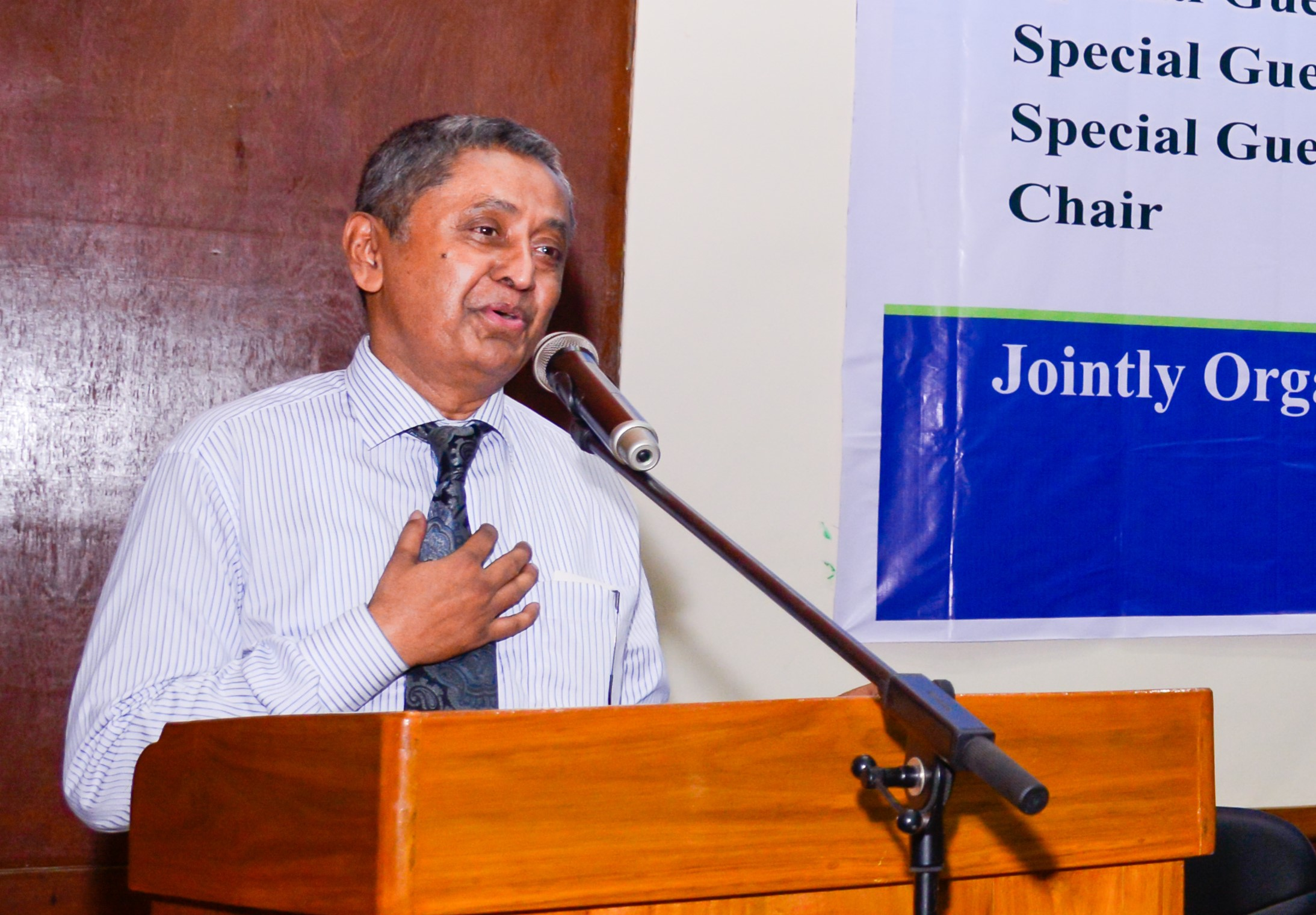
- Mohammad Shah Alam is giving a speech
- Born: 14 October 1951
- Died: 31 August 2020 (aged 68)
- Known for: Pioneer of 'Clinical Legal Education' in Bangladesh, Law Professor, Law Book Writer, Researcher
- Spouse: Fauzia Nasrin
- Children: 2

Academic background
- Education: University of Dhaka; Peoples' Friendship University of Russia

Academic work
- Institutions: University of Rajshahi; Former Dean of Faculty of Law, University of Chittagong

Mohammad Shah Alam (14 October 1951 – 31 August 2020) was a chairman (acting) of Bangladesh Law Commission and founding father of Faculty of law, University of Chittagong. He was a former professor at the Department of Law, University of Rajshahi He was also a freedom fighter and academician. He is considered the pioneer of Clinical Legal Education movement in Bangladesh. He had written several books on international law, and constitutional law.

== Early life and education ==
Mohammad Shah Alam was born on October 14, 1951, in Munshiganj, part of Dhaka Division to Md. Sujatul Islam, a teacher, politician and social worker and Firoza Begum. He was born into a Muslim family of four brothers and one sister. He received his primary education at his village school in Munshigonj. He passed his matriculation and intermediate from Rajshahi Cadet College with distinction in 1968 and 1970 respectively. He briefly studied economics at University of Dhaka at the time of Bangladesh Liberation War. After that, he went to the former Soviet Union on government scholarship for higher studies and studying for ten years successfully obtained graduation, post-graduation and Ph.D. degrees from Peoples' Friendship University of Russia.

== Career ==
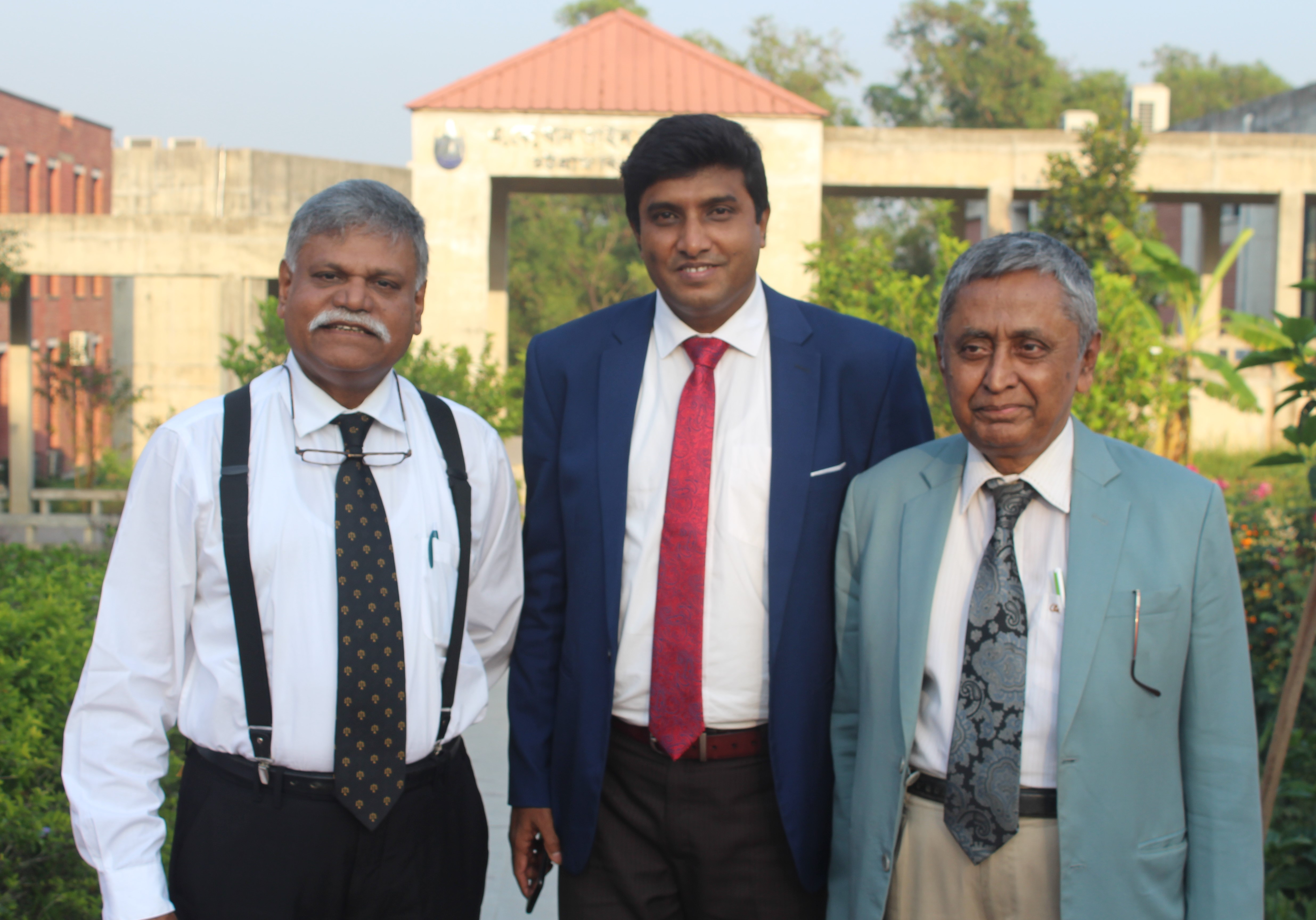
From left, Mizanur Rahman, Abm Abu Noman, Mohammad Shah Alam

His career journey started as assistant professor at Faculty of Law, University of Rajshahi in the early 1980s and after 10 years, in 1992, M Shah Alam joined as associate professor at University of Rajshahi. He is the founder Dean of the Faculty of Law and founder Chairman of Department of Law of University of Chittagong. In 1996, he became a full professor of Law and by joining as member of Bangladesh Law Commission, he also served as the acting chairman of the commission from 2010 to 2013. He was also an editor of Chittagong University Journal of Law. He was a Japan Foundation Fellow in 1995–96 at the Tokyo University Faculty of Law and a Senior Fulbright Fellow in 2001–2002 at the New York University School of Law.

Alam was a pioneer in introducing clinical legal education in Bangladesh. Clinical legal education is considered as an important mechanism of lawyering skill. Considering its importance, he integrated clinical legal education in the curriculum of the Faculty of Law, University of Chittagong, which was first of its kind in Bangladesh.

== Publications ==
- Bangladesher Shangbidhanik Itihash O Shongbidhaner Sohoj Path (trans. Constitutional History of Bangladesh and an Easy Reading of the Constitution (Dhaka: New Warsi Book Corporation, 1996)
- Enforcement of International Human Rights Law by Domestic Courts (Dhaka: New Warsi Book Corporation, 1996)
- Somokalin Antorjatik Ain (trans. Contemporary International Law) (Dhaka: New Warsi Book Corporation, 2012)
- Antorjatik Shongothon (trans. International Organisation) (Dhaka: New Warsi Book Corporation, 4th Edition, 2013)
- Bangladeshe Ain Songskar O Ain Commission (Dhaka: New Warsi Book Corporation, 2015)
- Selected Writings on International Law, Constitutional Law and Human Rights (Dhaka: New Warsi Book Corporation, 2015)

== Role as an independence activist ==
Shah Alam fought in sector no. 2 as an independence activist of the Bangladesh Liberation War along with his elder and younger brother in his hometown Bikrampur, Munshigonj.

== Personal life and death ==
Alam was married to Fauzia Nasrin. They had one daughter and had a son who died in 2001.

Mohammad Shah Alam died on August 31, 2020, at the age of 68. He was suffering from various complications after having a brain stroke. As an independence activist, after his death Guard of honour was given.
