= Abdul Mannan (educator) =

Bangladeshi educator

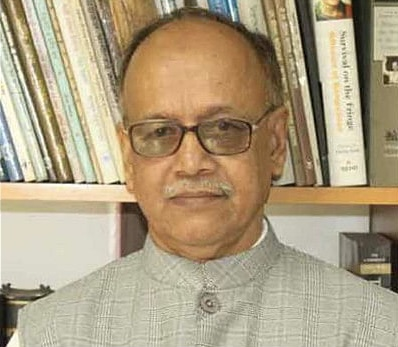

Vice-Chancellor of the University of Chittagong
- In office 6 November 1996 – 13 February 2001
- Preceded by: Rafiqul Islam Chowdhury
- Succeeded by: Md. Fazle Hossain

12th Chairman of University Grants Commission
- In office 7 May 2015 – 7 May 2019
- Succeeded by: Yusuf Ali Mollah

Personal details
- Born: Chittagong
- Education: University of Dhaka; University of Hawaii; Miami University
- Occupation: university academic, professor

Abdul Mannan is a Bangladeshi educator. He served as the 12th chairman of University Grants Commission of Bangladesh during 2015–2019 and the vice-chancellor of the University of Chittagong during 1996–2001.

== Education and career ==
Mannan earned his master's in Management from the University of Dhaka in 1972. He completed his graduate and post-graduate studies from the University of Hawaii and the Miami University in 1978.

Mannan started his career when he joined the Department of Management of the University of Chittagong as a lecturer in 1973. He conducted advanced research on international commerce in Ohio State University in 1989.

In 1996, Mannan became the youngest vice-chancellor of the country when was appointed at the University of Chittagong.

In 2005, Mannan took an early retirement from the University of Chittagong. He then became an Advisor to the board of trustees and a full-time Professor in the Business School of the University of Liberal Arts Bangladesh (ULAB). He also served as a professor in the Department of Business and the Dean of Faculties at the East West University.

As chairman of the University Grants Commission, Mannan banned private universities from admitting students with GED certificates in 2018.

In May 2025, an attempted murder case was filed against Mannan over a student of Alia Madrasa getting injured in Old Dhaka during protests against former Prime Minister Sheikh Hasina in August 2024.
