= Qudrat-e-Elahi Rahman Shafique =

Colonel in the Bangladesh Army

- কুদরত-এ-এলাহী রহমান শফিক
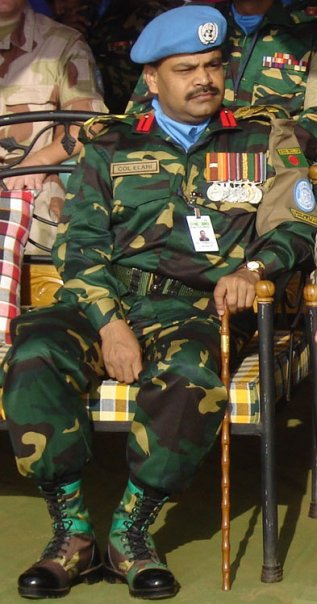
- Born: 1 November 1962; Rangpur, East Pakistan, Pakistan
- Died: 25 February 2009 (aged 46); Pilkhana, Dhaka, Bangladesh
- Education: University of Dhaka
- Military career
- Allegiance: Bangladesh
- Branch: Bangladesh Army; Bangladesh Rifles
- Service years: 1983-2009
- Rank: Colonel
- Unit: East Bengal Regiment
- Commands: Sector Commander of BDR; 2IC of 1st East Bengal Regiment; CO of 18th East Bengal Regiment
- Conflicts: Chittagong Hill Tracts Conflict; UNMIBH; UNMIS; Bangladesh Rifles revolt †

Qudrat-e-Elahi Rahman Shafique (Bengali: কুদরত-এ-এলাহী রহমান শফিক ; 1 November 1962 – 25 February 2009) was a colonel in the Bangladesh Army who died in the 2009 Bangladesh Rifles Mutiny.

== Early life ==
Shafique was born on 1 November 1962 in Rangpur District, East Pakistan, Pakistan. His father, Habibur Rahman, was a former secretary of the government of Bangladesh, and his mother, Rokeya Rahman, was a teacher at Viqarunnisa Noon School and College. He is the nephew of former president Hussain Muhammad Ershad. After graduating from Jhenaidah Cadet College, Shafique joined Bangladesh Military Academy in 1981.

== Career ==
Shafique was commissioned as an officer in the Bangladesh Army on 10 June 1983. He completed his bachelor's degree at the University of Chittagong. He was initially posted in the 3rd East Bengal Regiment.

Shafique worked as an instructor in the School of Infantry and Tactics of the Bangladesh Army in Sylhet District. He completed an MBA degree from the Institute of Business Administration, University of Dhaka, in 1994. He came first in his class.

Shafique served a year in the United Nations Mission in Bosnia and Herzegovina. He served as the brigade major in Bandarban Cantonment in 1995. From 1997 to 1998, he completed his PSC at the Defence Services Command and Staff College. He served as the second in command of the 1st Bengal Infantry Regiment based in Sylhet.

After the creation of the Military Institute of Science and Technology, Shafique was assigned to design the school's MBA program. Afterwards he was appointed the commanding officer of the 18 Bengal Regiment based in Chittagong Hill Tracts.

Shafique was then posted at Defence Services Command and Staff College and promoted to senior instructor and colonel after two years of teaching on 7 August 2005. He served as sector commander in Juba in 2007 in the United Nations Mission in Sudan and received a gallantry award from the United Nations. Next year, he started on his National Defence College course and completed it in December, and at the same time, he completed a master's degree in philosophy from the University of Dhaka.

Shafique was appointed the sector commander of Bangladesh Rifles in Dinajpur District in January 2009.

== Personal life ==
Shafique was married to celebrity chef Lobbi Rahman. Their son, Saquib Rahman is a former Jatiyo Party politician, the editor of Progress Magazine and a senior lecturer at the Department of Law in North South University.

== Death ==
Shafique had arrived for the darbar (conference of all sector commanders) in the Bangladesh Rifles headquarters. He was killed on 25 February 2009 by Bangladesh Rifles mutineers during the Bangladesh Rifles revolt. Shahid Colonel Kudrat Elahi Junior School in Dinajpur was named after him.
