= Monsur Ul Karim =

Bangladeshi painter (1950–2020)

- মনসুর উল করিম
- Born: 1 March 1950; Rajbari District, East Bengal, Dominion of Pakistan
- Died: 5 October 2020 (aged 70); Dhaka, Bangladesh
- Education: University of Dhaka; University of Chittagong
- Occupation: Artist

Monsur Ul Karim (1 March 1950 – 5 October 2020) was a Bangladeshi painter.

== Education ==
Karim earned his bachelor's from the Faculty of Fine Arts, University of Dhaka in 1972, and his master's from the University of Chittagong in 1974.

He was awarded the Ekushey Padak in 2009 by the Government of Bangladesh.
