= Rafiqul Islam Chowdhury =

Bangladesh political scientist

Vice-Chancellor of the University of Chittagong
- In office 30 December 1991 – 6 November 1996
- Preceded by: Alamgir Muhammad Serajuddin
- Succeeded by: Abdul Mannan

Personal details
- Died: 14 October 2008

Rafiqul Islam Chowdhury (died 14 October 2008) was a Bangladesh academic and political scientist. He served as the 9th vice-chancellor of the University of Chittagong.
