= University of Chittagong =

Public university in Bangladesh

- চট্টগ্রাম বিশ্ববিদ্যালয়
- Crest of University of Chittagong
- Other name: CU
- Motto: Imagine, Lead, Change
- Type: Public, Research
- Established: 18 November 1966; 60 years ago
- Accreditation: Association of Commonwealth Universities
- Affiliations: University Grants Commission
- Chancellor: Mirza Fakhrul Islam Alamgir
- Vice-Chancellor: Mohammad Al-Forkan
- Academic staff: 974
- Administrative staff: 311 (male 277, female 34)
- Students: est. 27,550; (est. 18,000 male); (est. 9,500 female)
- Location: Hathazari Upazila, Chittagong District, Bangladesh; 22.4699°N 91.7904°E
- Campus: 2,312.32 acres (9.3576 km^{2}); Suburban
- Website: www.cu.ac.bd

University rankings

Global – Overall
- THE World: 1201–1500 (2026)
- Scimago Global: 3027 (2025)

Global – Liberal arts
- THE Social Sciences: 801–1000 (2025)

Global – Life sciences and medicine
- THE Life Sciences: 801–1000 (2025)

Global – Science and engineering
- THE Engineering: 801–1000 (2025)
- THE Physical Sciences: 801–1000 (2025)

Regional – Overall
- QS Asia: 646 (2026)

The University of Chittagong (Bengali: চট্টগ্রাম বিশ্ববিদ্যালয়) also known as Chittagong University (CU), is a public research university located in Chittagong, Bangladesh. It was established on 18 November 1966. It is one of the oldest universities in Bangladesh. Having an area of 2,312.32 acres (935.76 ha) campus, CU is the largest university in Bangladesh. It is one of the five autonomous universities in Bangladesh.

== Facilities ==
=== Library ===
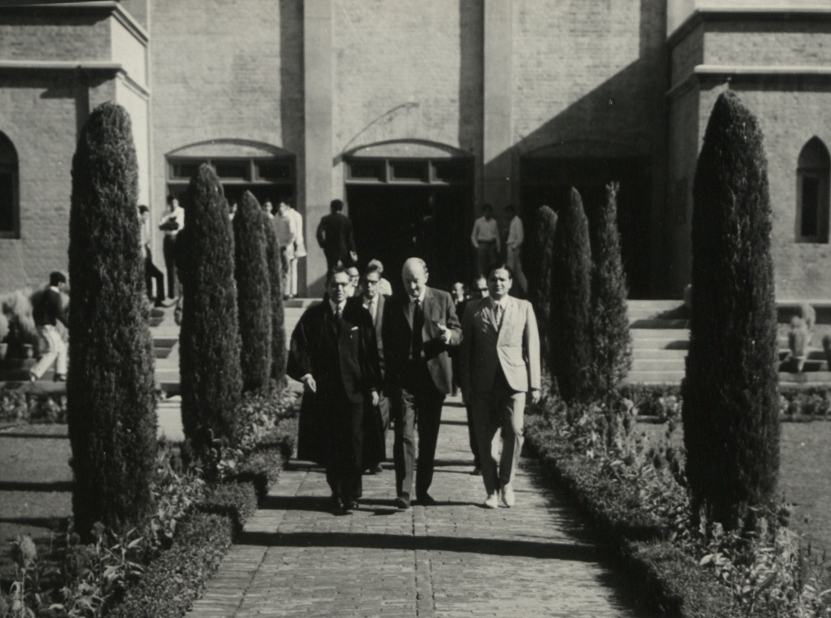
University of Chittagong, 1970

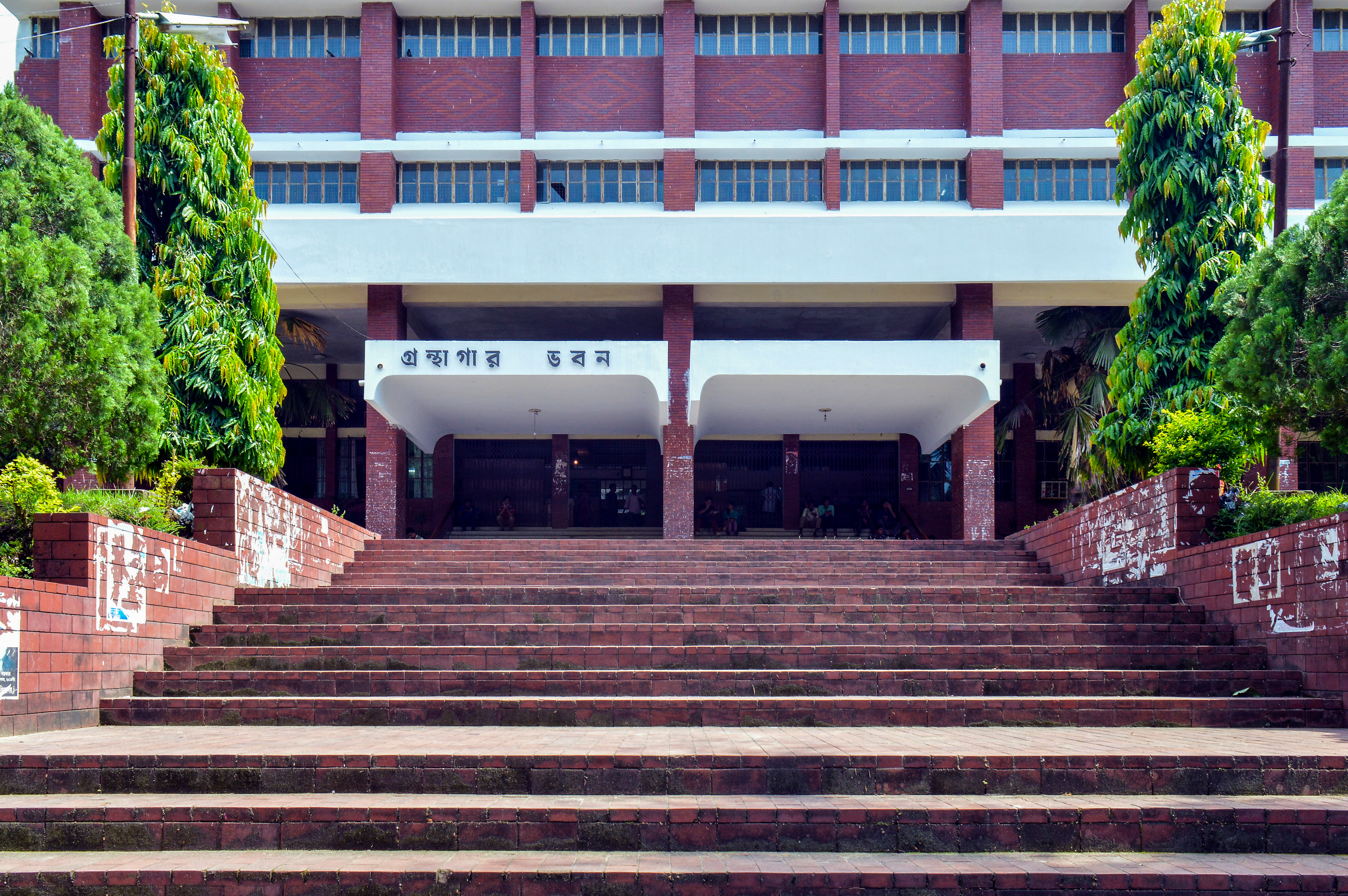
Central Library, University of Chittagong

Chittagong University's collection of about 350,000 books, and over 40,000 bound journals is housed in a 56,700 square feet (5,270 m^{2}) library built in 1990.

=== Chittagong University Museum ===
Chittagong University Museum was established in 1973 with artifacts from the History Department, including fossils found amongst the Nasirabad hills. It has subsequently accumulated an extensive collection of historical artifacts and paintings. In 2016, The Daily Star donated a Chittagong history archive to the museum.

=== University shuttle train ===
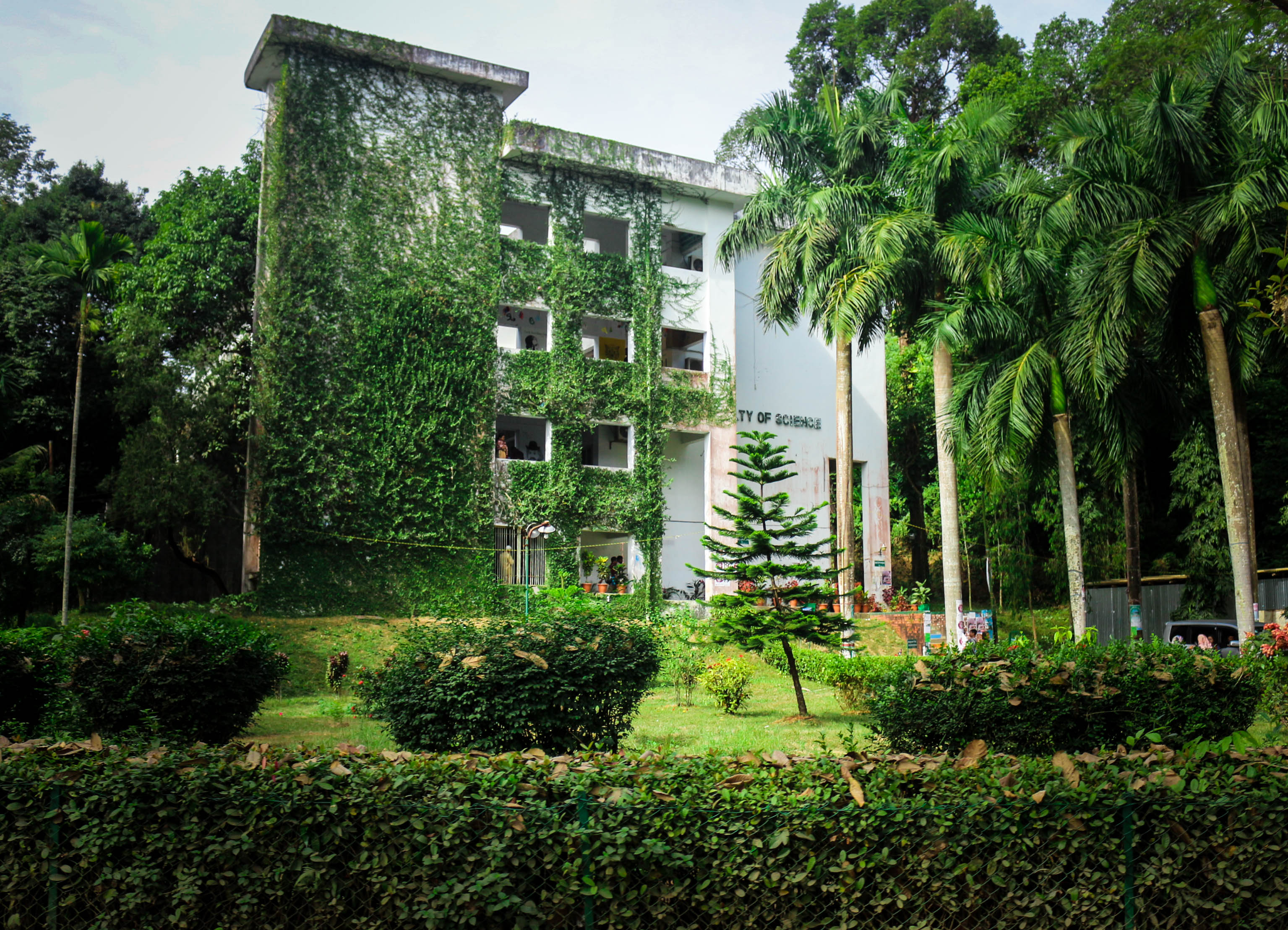
Faculty of Science

The university shuttle train is operated by Bangladesh Railway eastern division and monitored by university authority. Trains leave Chattogram railway station and Sholoshohor railway station, and city-bound trains leave Chittagong University railway station.

==== Shuttle graffiti ====
Chittagong University shuttle trains have a long history of graffiti art. There were allegations it was being used by rival political groups to assert influence over train compartments. Following clashes in April 2011 between five compartment-based groups that left at least eight students injured, the university expelled 11 students and banned all forms of compartment-based organizational activities, including the posting of posters, leaflets, and graffiti on the trains. Eleven years after that incident, German artist Lukas Zeilinger, accompanied by Livia, his wife, and Arup Barua, a teacher at the Department of Dramatics of the university, painted the carriages once again. The project was self-funded by the Zeiligers as part of their art project.

=== Chittagong University Central Students' Union ===
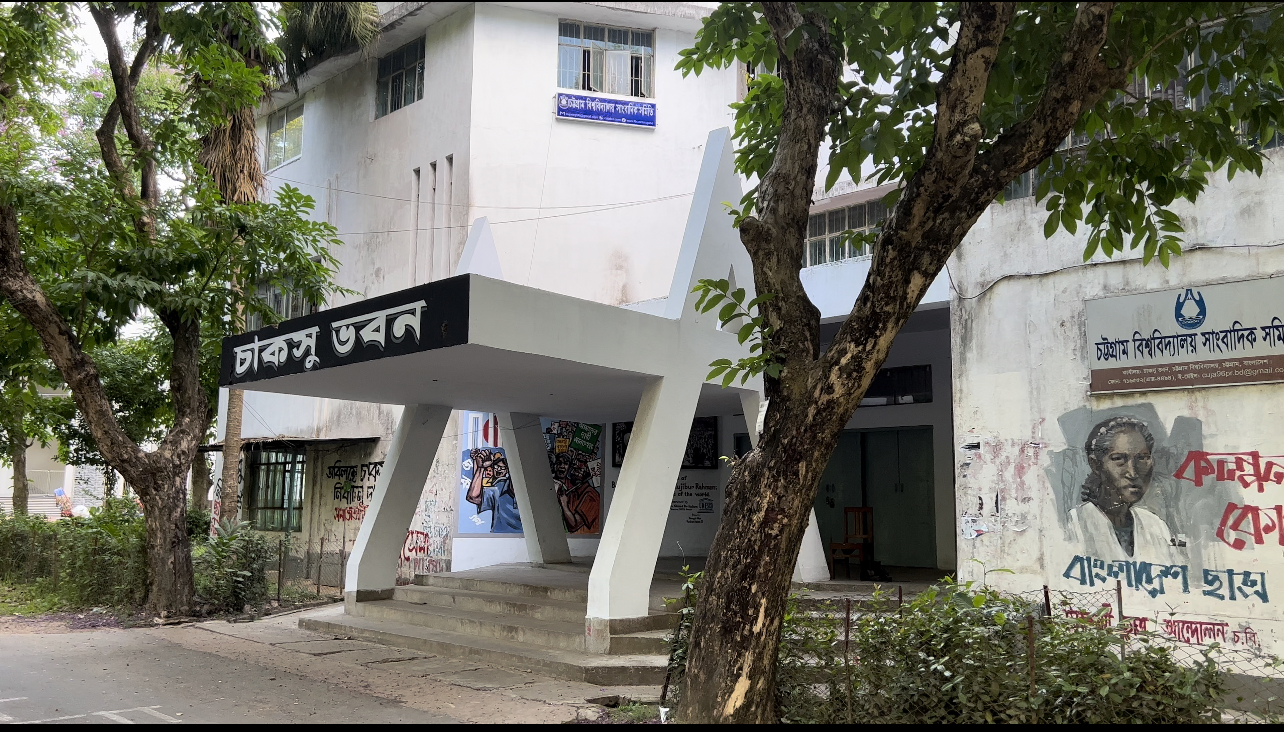
CUCSU Bhaban

Chittagong University Central Students' Union is the official students' union of the University of Chittagong. It is commonly known as CUCSU. Its aim is to represent Chittagong University students in the university's decision-making, and to give a voice to the students in the national higher education policy debate, and to provide direct services to the student body. It was established in 1966. Its current constitution was adopted in 2025.

=== Student organizations ===
The Chittagong University Chess Club is the official student-run organization recognized by the university to promote chess culture, training, and competitive play on campus.

The club's leadership includes a National Arbiter and FIDE School Instructor. The current president of the club, Tanjila Tur Noor', is officially recognized as the second female FIDE School Instructor in Bangladesh.

== Academic ==
Faculties	10
Departments	54
Institute	7
Research center	6
Affiliated educational institutions	21

=== Faculties ===
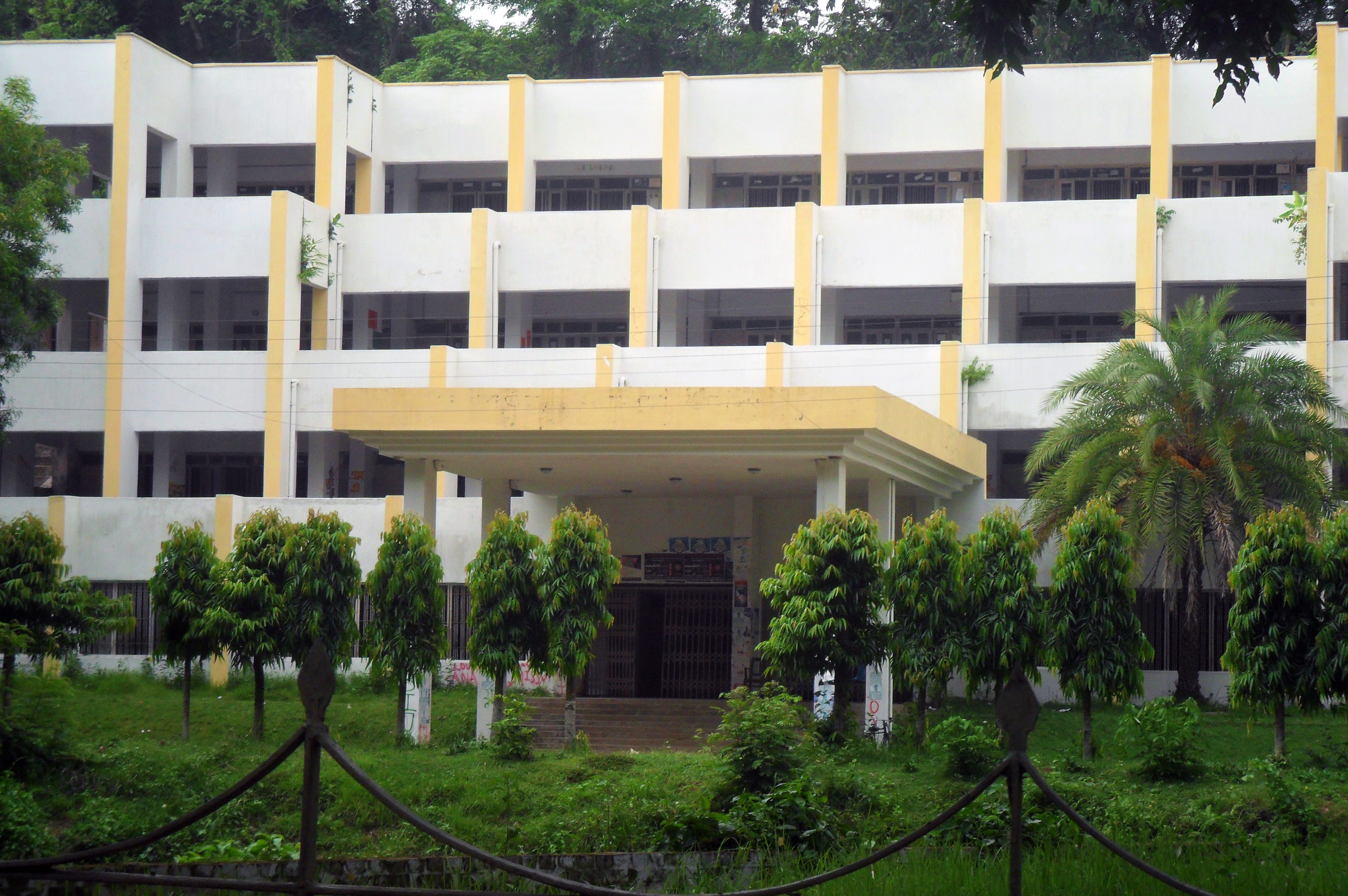
Old Arts Building

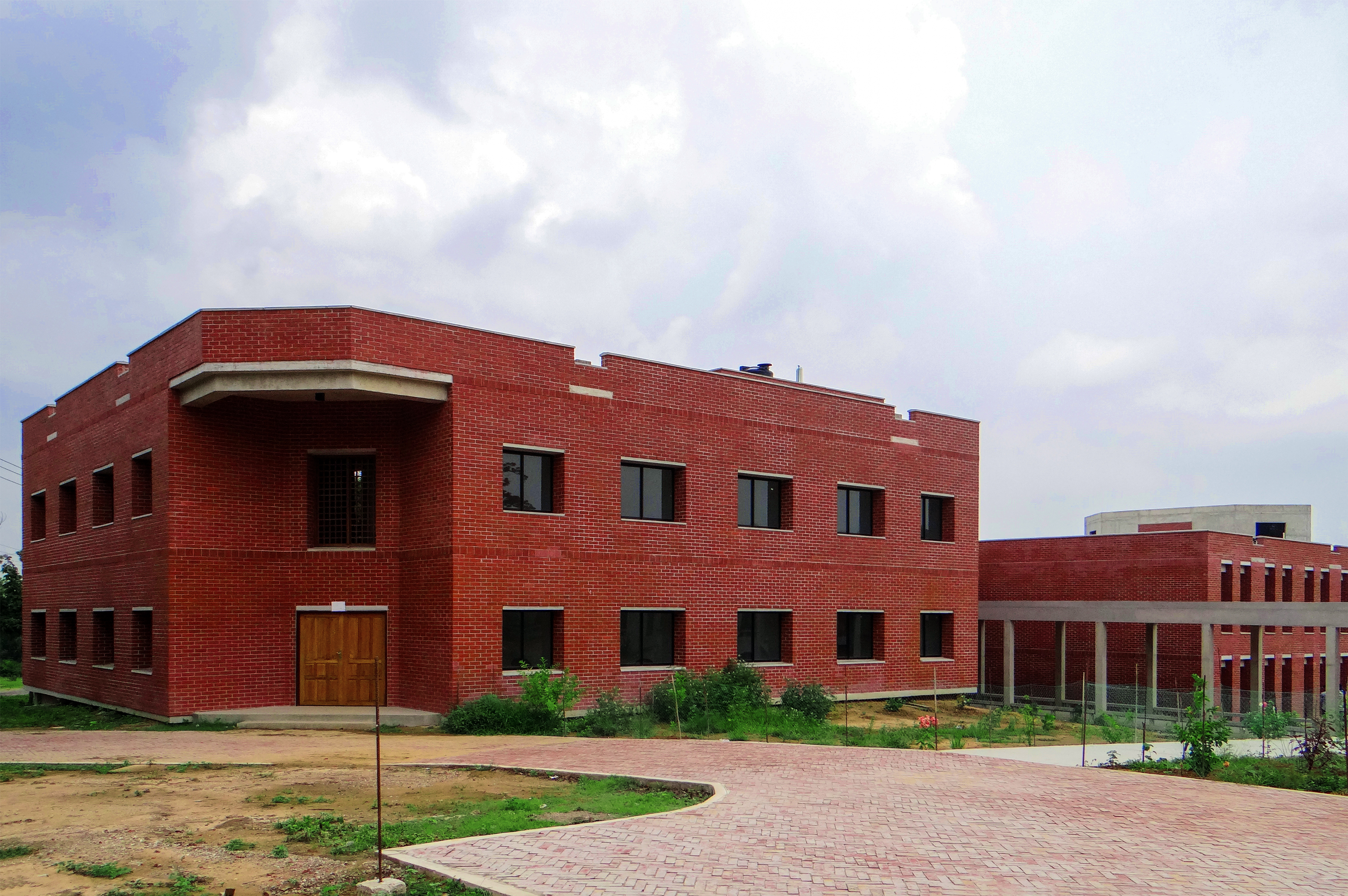
AK Khan Building, Faculty of Law

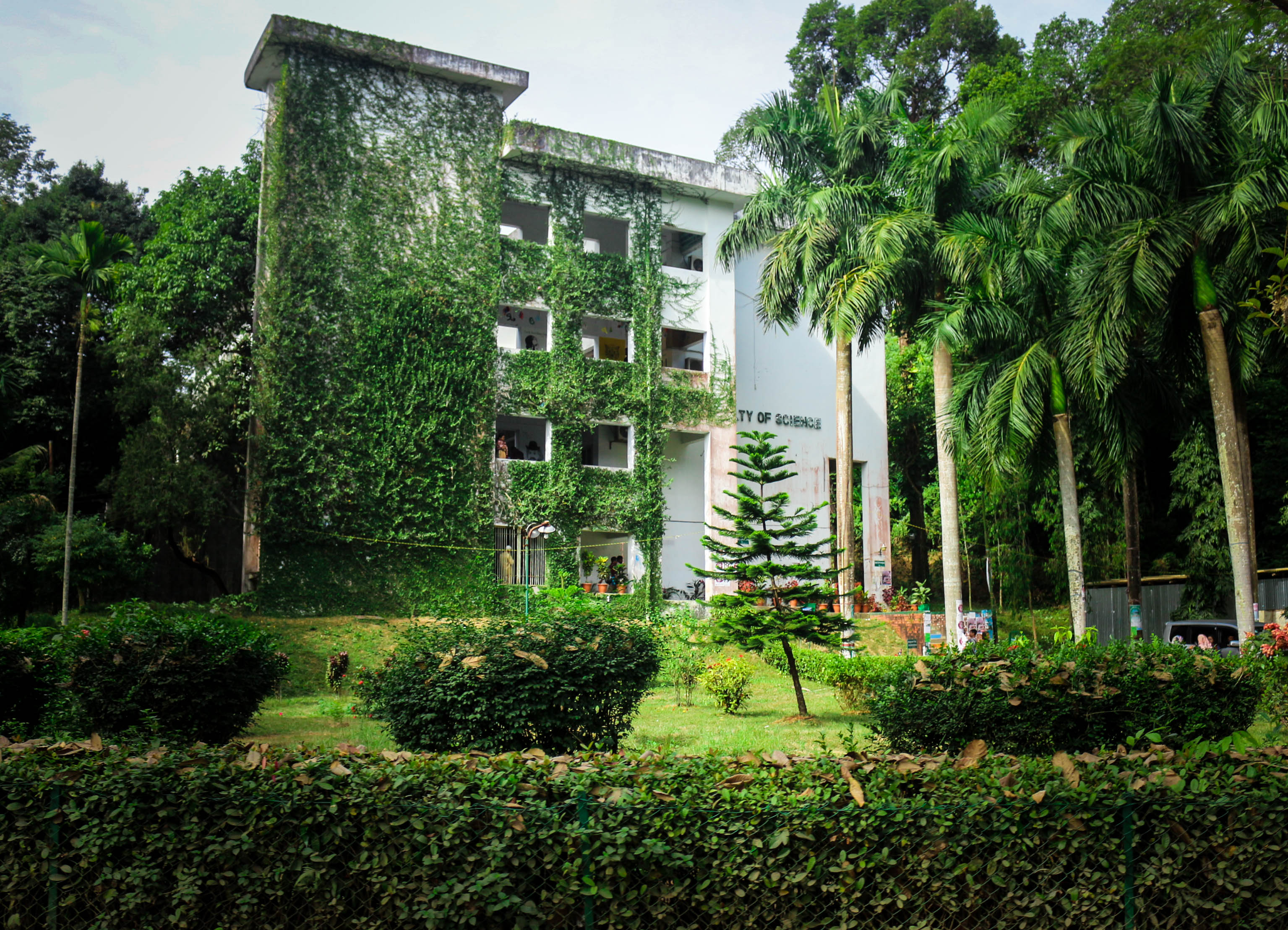
Faculty of Science

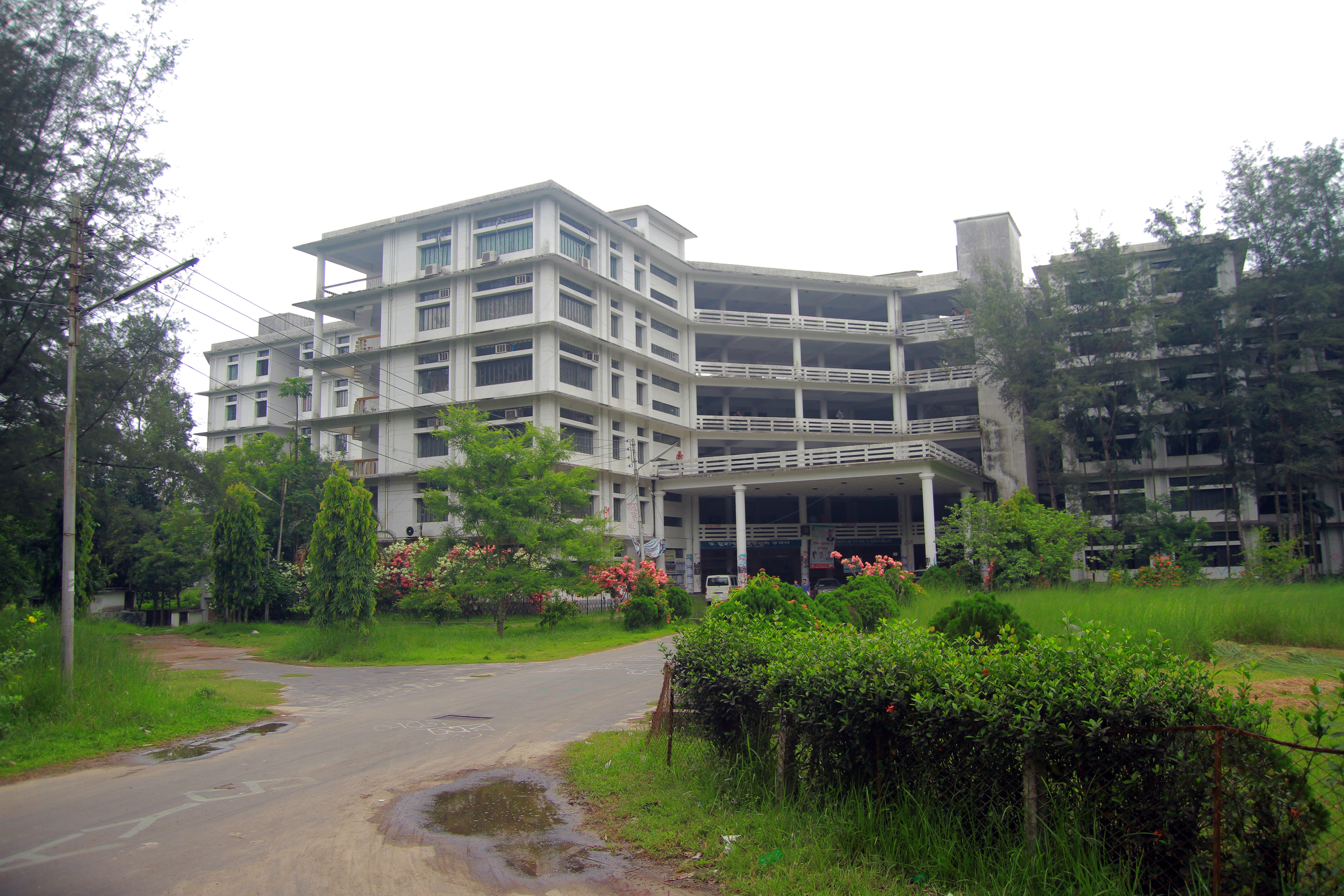
Faculty of Social Sciences

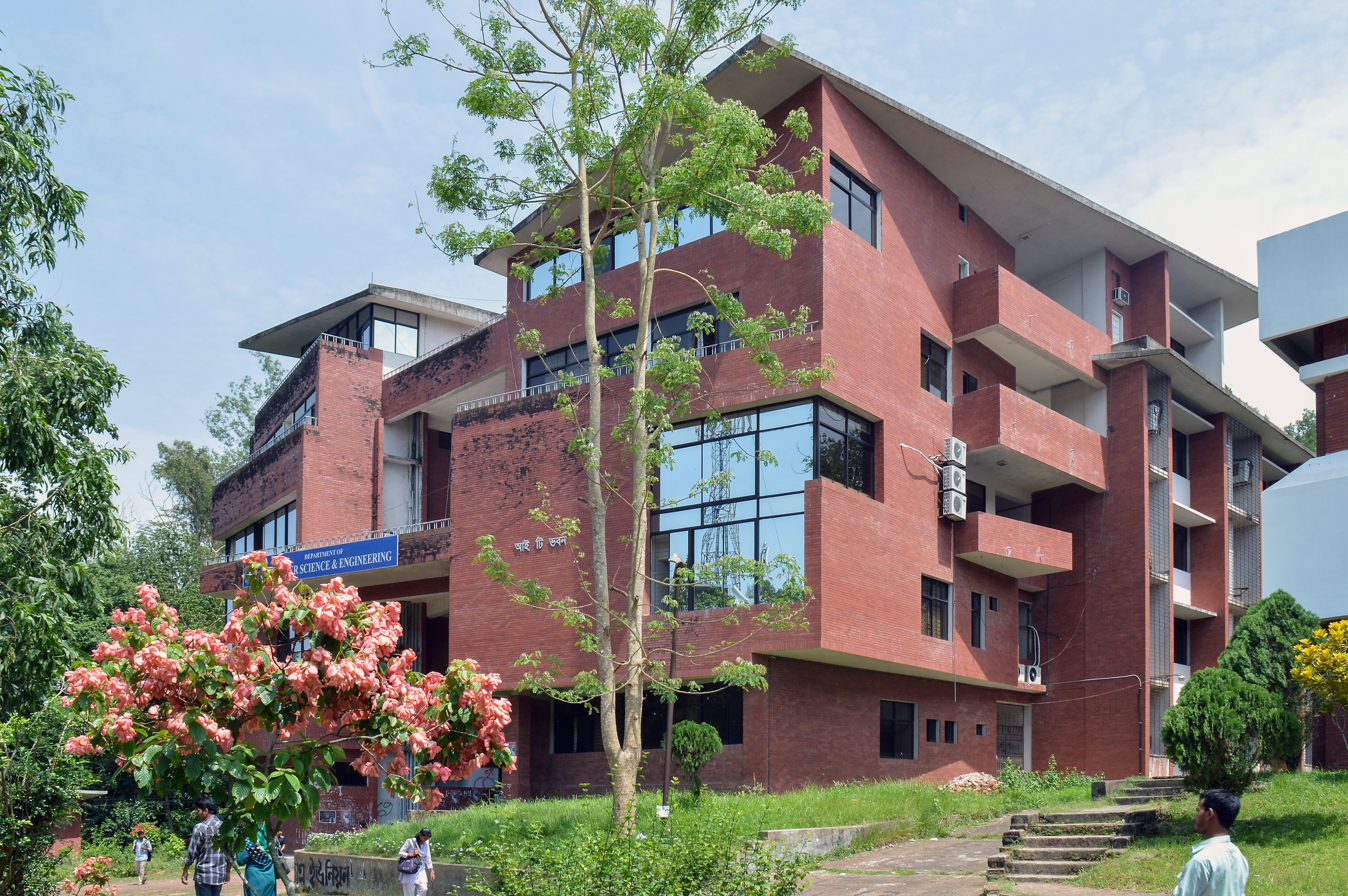
Faculty of Engineering

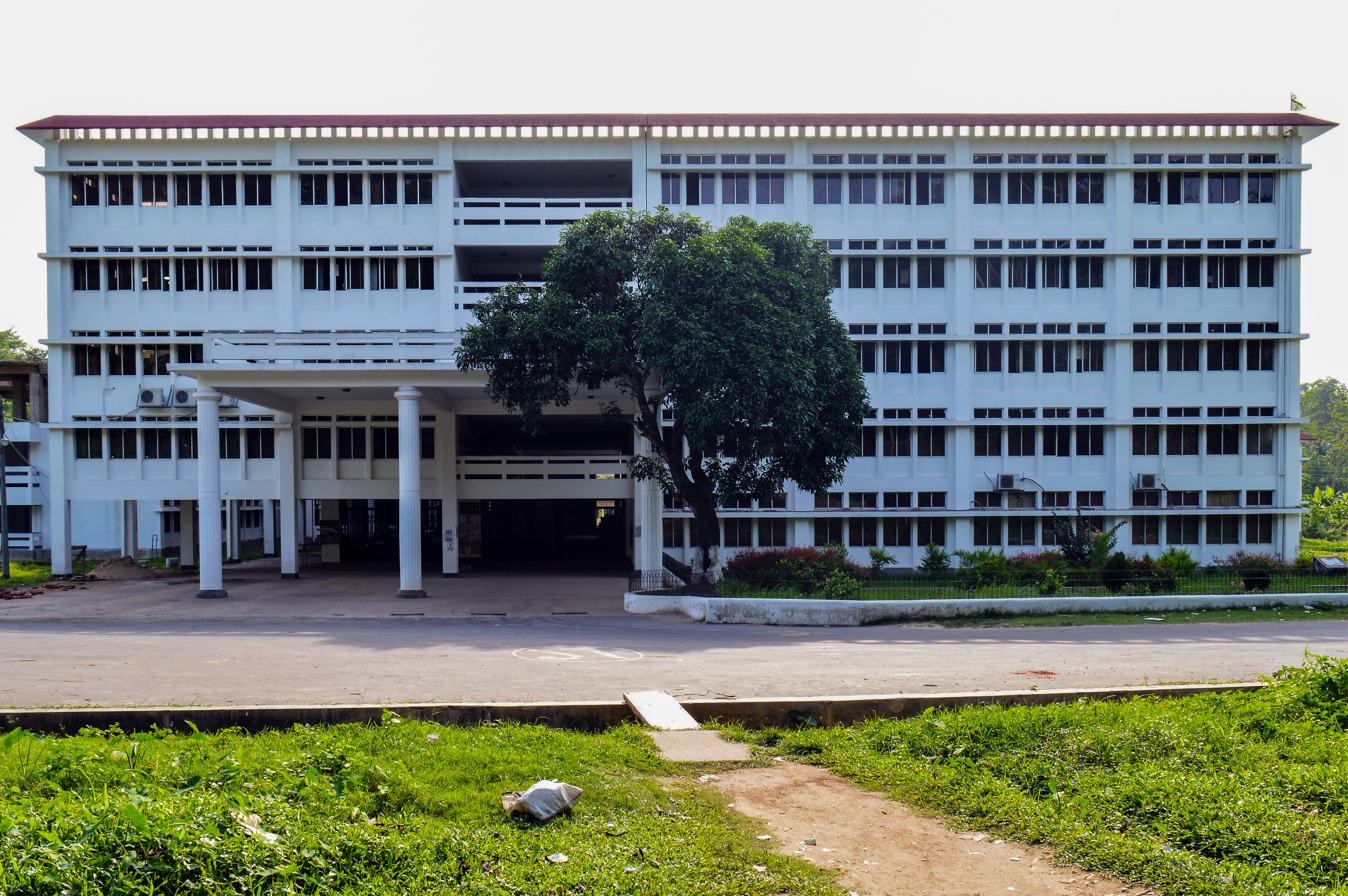
Faculty of Biological Sciences

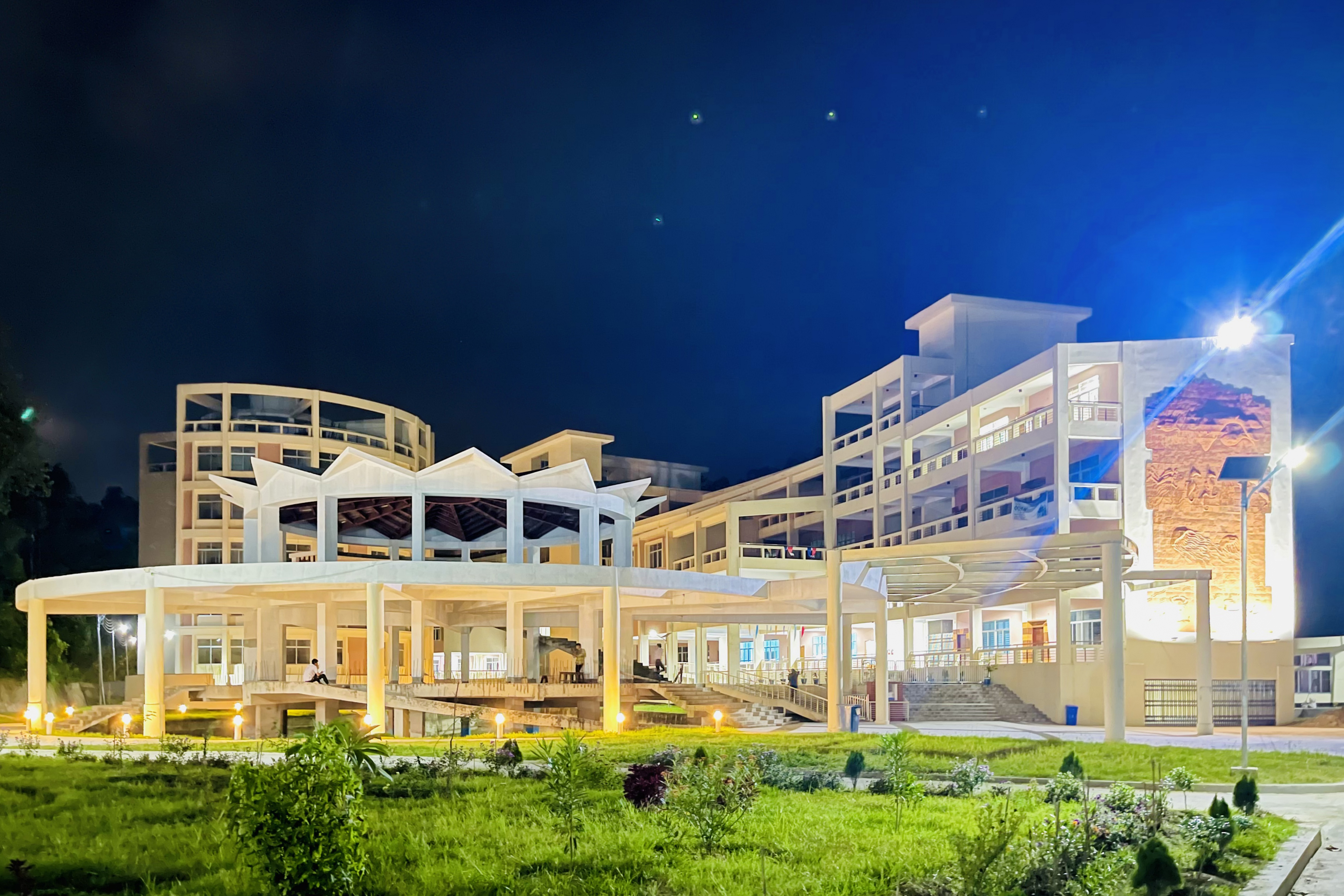
Faculty of Marine Sciences and Fisheries

As of 2026, Chittagong University has 54 departments under 10 faculties.

Faculty	Established	Department
Faculty of Arts and Humanities	1966	14
Faculty of Law	1966	01
Faculty of Science	1969	05
Faculty of Business Administration	1970	06
Faculty of Social Sciences	1971	10
Faculty of Engineering	2001	02
Faculty of Biological Sciences		09
Faculty of Education		02
Faculty of Medicine		01
Faculty of Marine Sciences and Fisheries	2019	02

=== Institutes ===
Chittagong University currently has 7 institutes

- Institute of Education and Research
- Institute of Fine Arts
- Institute of Modern Languages
- Community Ophthalmology Institute
- Institute of Forestry and Environmental Sciences
- Institute of Marine Science
- Social Science Research Institute

=== Research centers ===
The university currently has 6 research centers.

- Jamal Nazrul Islam Mathematics and Physical Science Research Centre
- Nazrul Research Centre
- Bureau of Business Research
- Center for Social Science Research
- Chittagong University Center for Business Administration
- Center for Asian Studies

=== Affiliated educational institutions ===
There are currently some educational institutions under the University of Chittagong:

College of Engineering

1. Newcastle University College, Chittagong

Institute

1. Chittagong Institute of Technology, Chittagong
2. Chittagong Institute of Fashion and Technology, Chittagong

Other

1. Home Economics College, Chittagong

=== Library ===
Chittagong University Central Library is the largest library in Chittagong and one of the richest libraries in the country. The current collection in this library is around 350,000, which includes rare books, journals, audio-visual material, manuscripts and Braille books for the blind. At the inauguration of the university in November 1966, the library started with only 300 books. The library moved to its current building in November 1990. The three-storied library has separate rooms for students, researchers and teachers. There is also an auditorium in the library building. Photocopying facilities are available in the library. The library also has facilities for daily reading of national and regional newspapers. The library is currently under automation.

=== Medical Center ===
Chittagong University Medical Center is located near the law faculty of the university. It works to provide free medical care and pathological examination for university students, faculty and staff. Apart from this, free medical care is also provided to the family members of teachers and staff. This medical center has round-the-clock services every day of the week, where doctors provide medical care on a rotating basis. This center has 11 doctors and 4 ambulances. There are also 6 temporary beds in the medical center premises.

== Campus ==
=== Residential halls ===
As of 2026, there are 14 residential halls at the university, of which 9 are for male and 5 for female students.

Male student halls
	Estd.	Students	Named for
Alawal Hall	1966	260	Alaol
Atish Dipankar Srigyan Hall	2014	550	Atiśa
A F Rahman Hall	1966	258	Ahmad Fazlur Rahman
Shahjalal Hall	1974	475	Shah Jalal
Suhrawardy Hall	1974	375	Huseyn Shaheed Suhrawardy
Shah Amanat Hall	1977	632	Shah Amanat
Shaheed Abdur Rab Hall	1994	509	Abdur Rab (Note: A student of Chittagong University and general secretary of its student union. He died during the Independence War of Bangladesh.)
Masterda Surya Sen Hall (male & female block)	2010	204	Surya Sen
Shaheed Farhad Hossain Hall	2014	1000	Farhad Hossain

Female student halls
	Estd.	Students	Named for
Shamsun Nahar Hall		676	Shamsunnahar Mahmud
Pritilata Hall		531	Pritilata Waddedar
Deshnetri Begum Khaleda Zia Hall		500	Khaleda Zia
Nawab Faizunnesa Hall		312	Nawab Faizunnesa
Bijoy 24 Hall	2015	500	Bangladesh quota reform movement

Hostels
	Estd	Students	
Shilpi Rashid Chowdhury Hostel			For Fine Arts students
Govinda Gunalanker Hostel	1996		For Buddhists

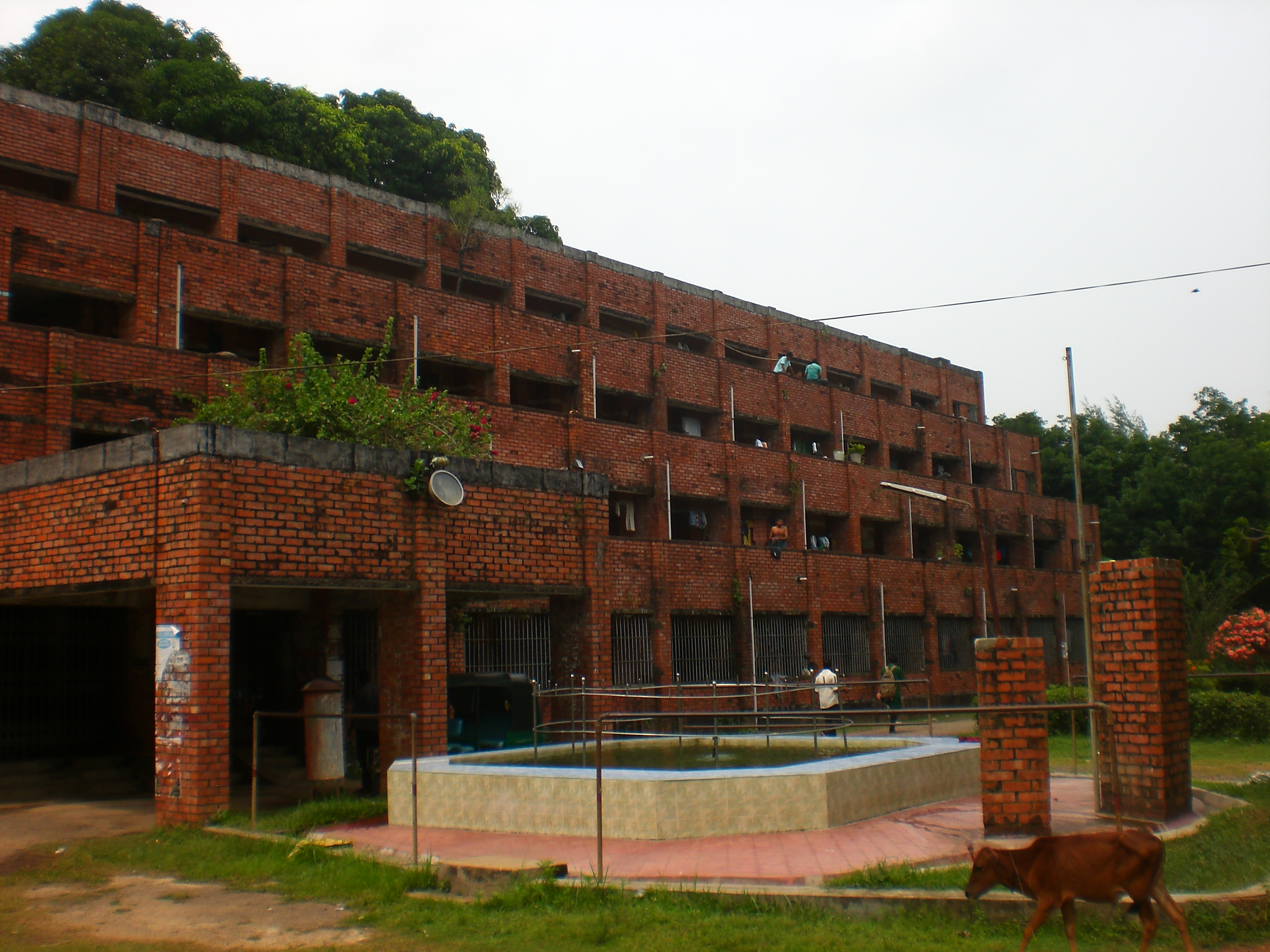
A F Rahman Hall

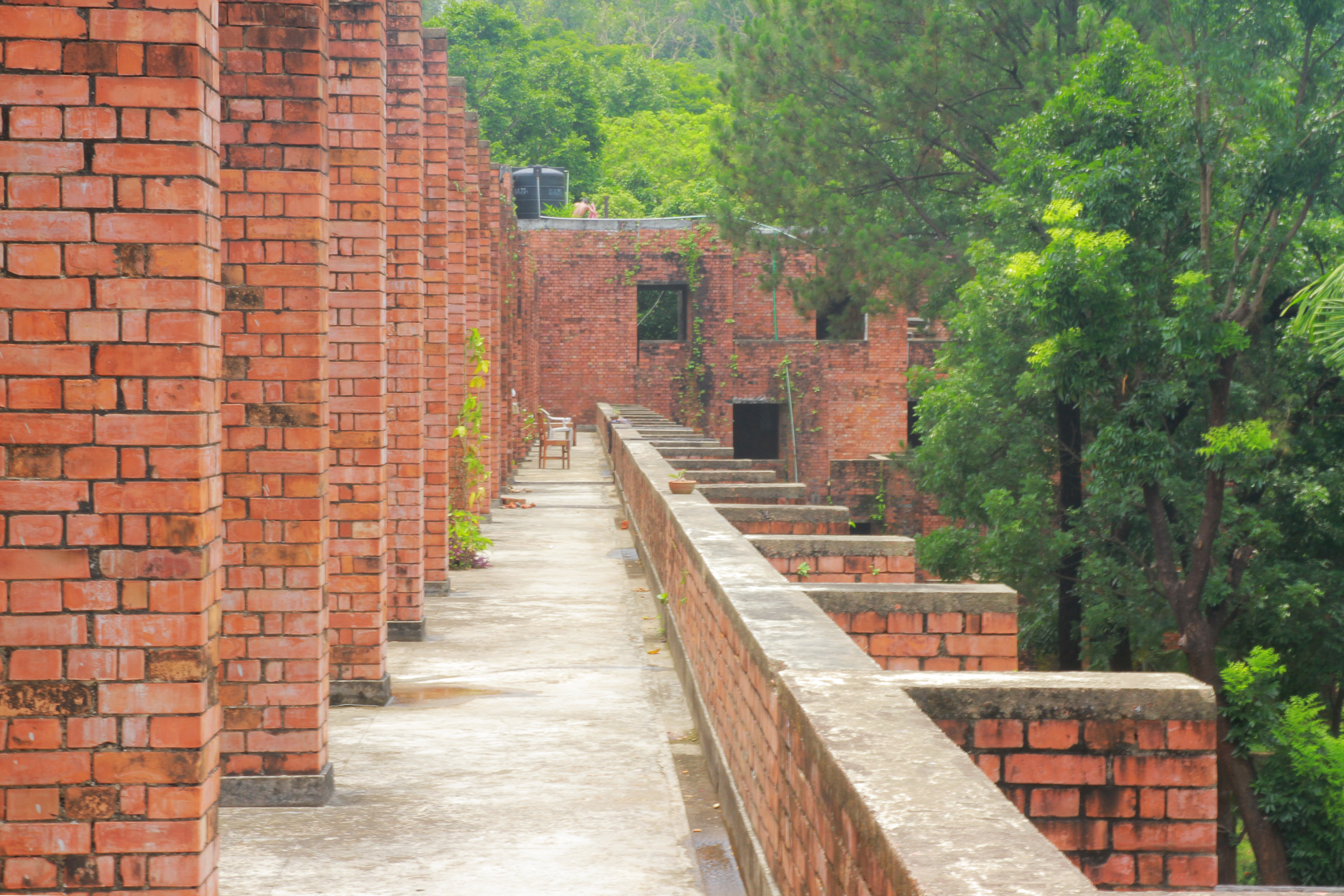
Shahjalal Hall

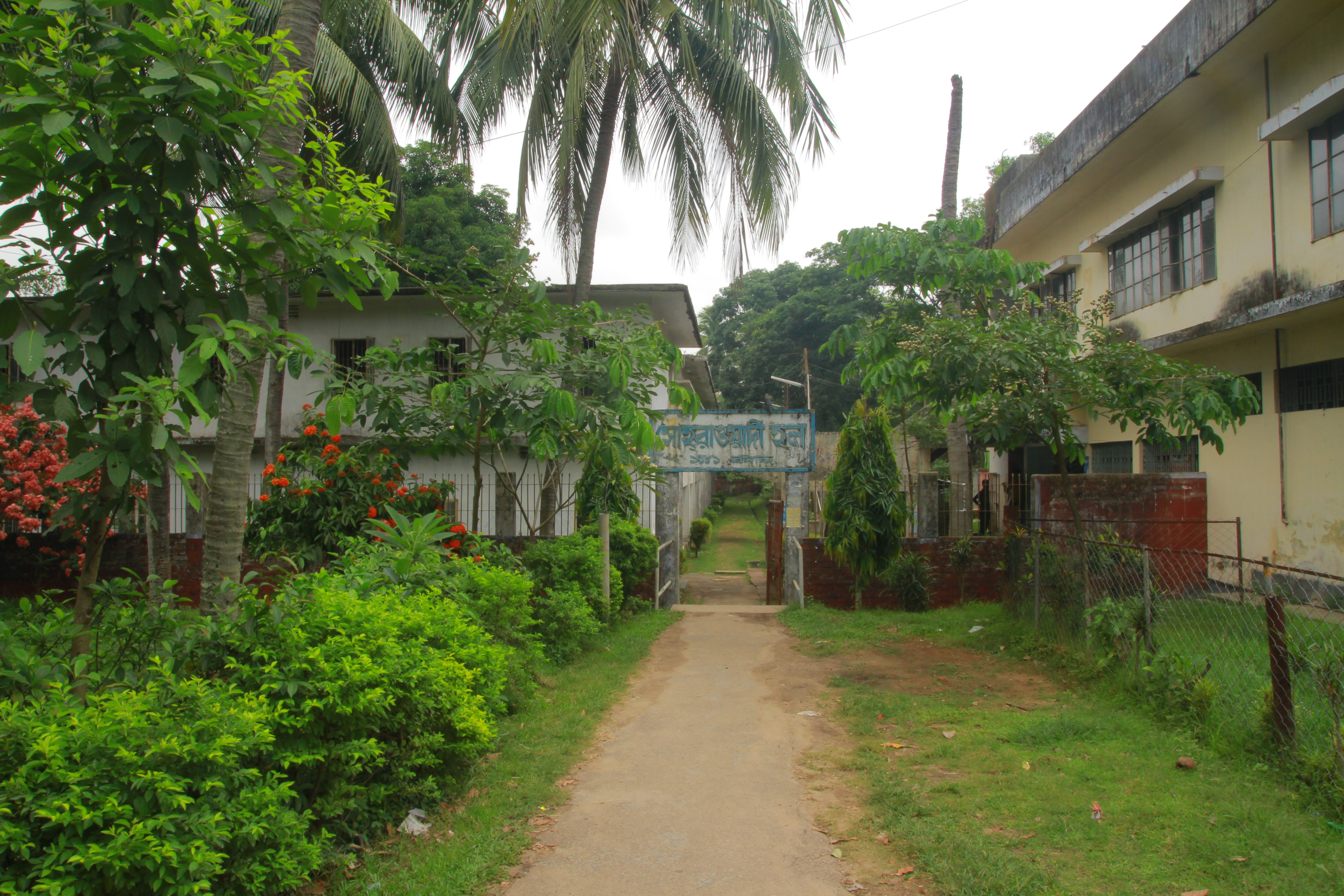
Suhrawardy Hall

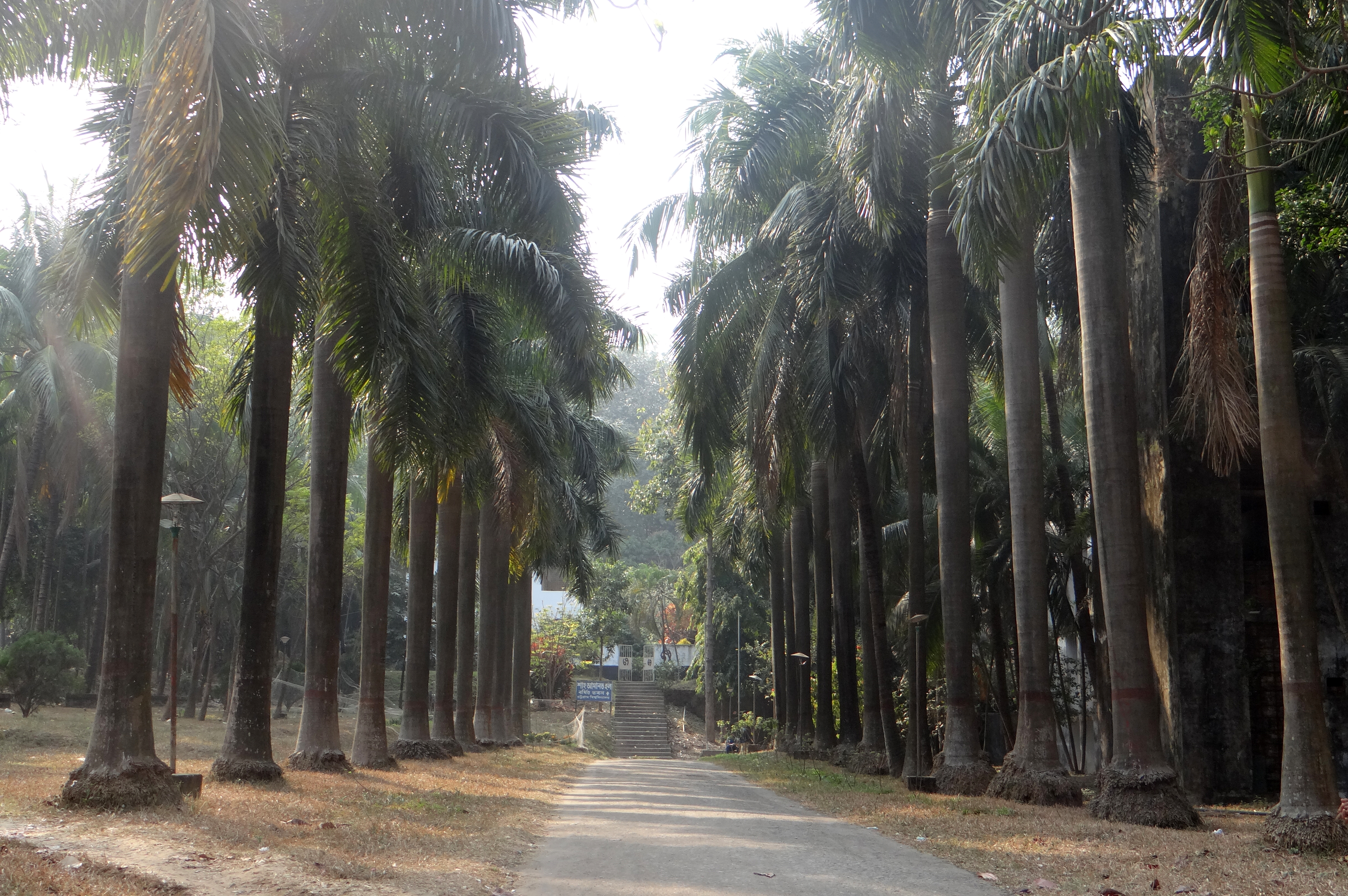
Shah Amanat Hall

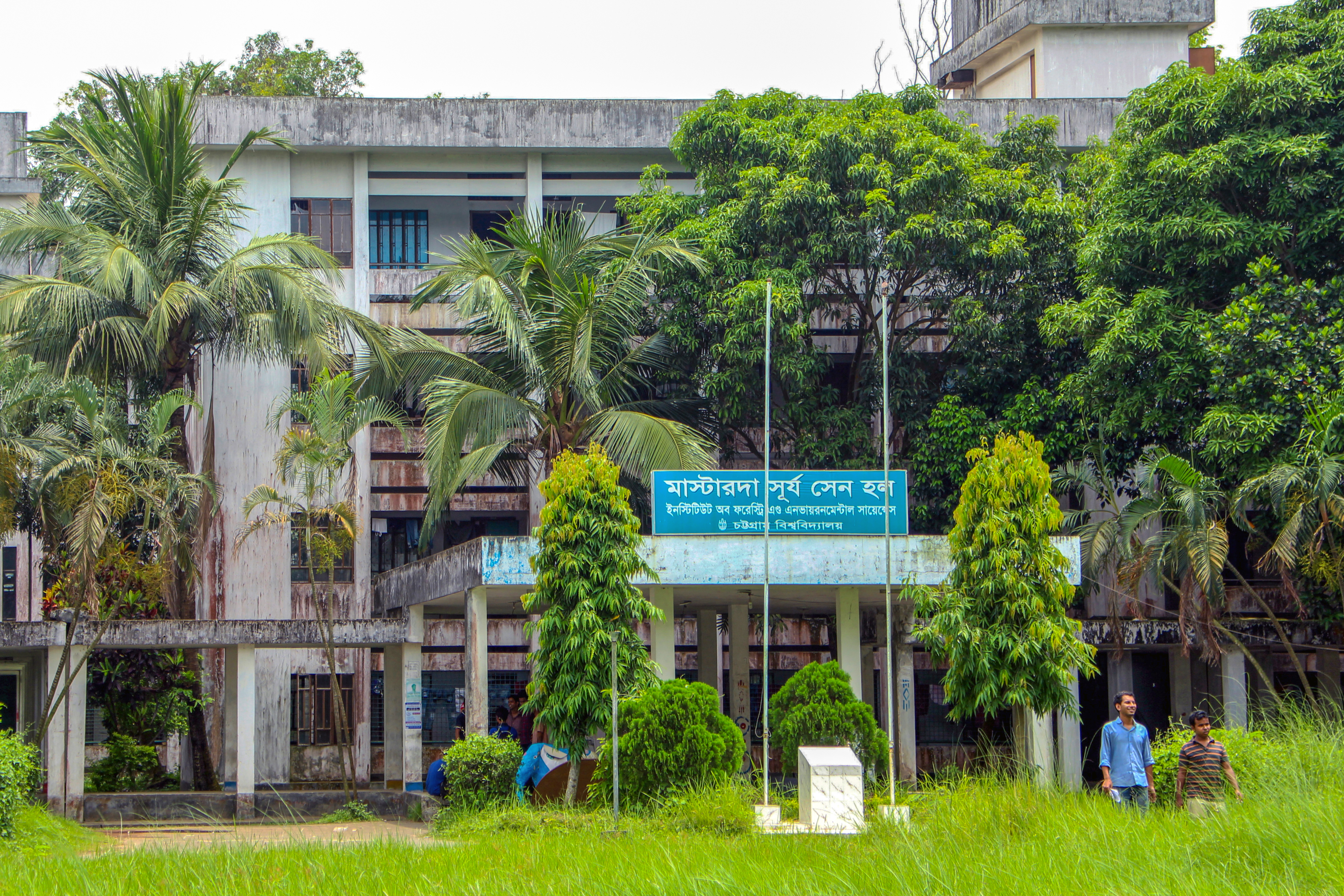
Masterda Surya Sen Hall

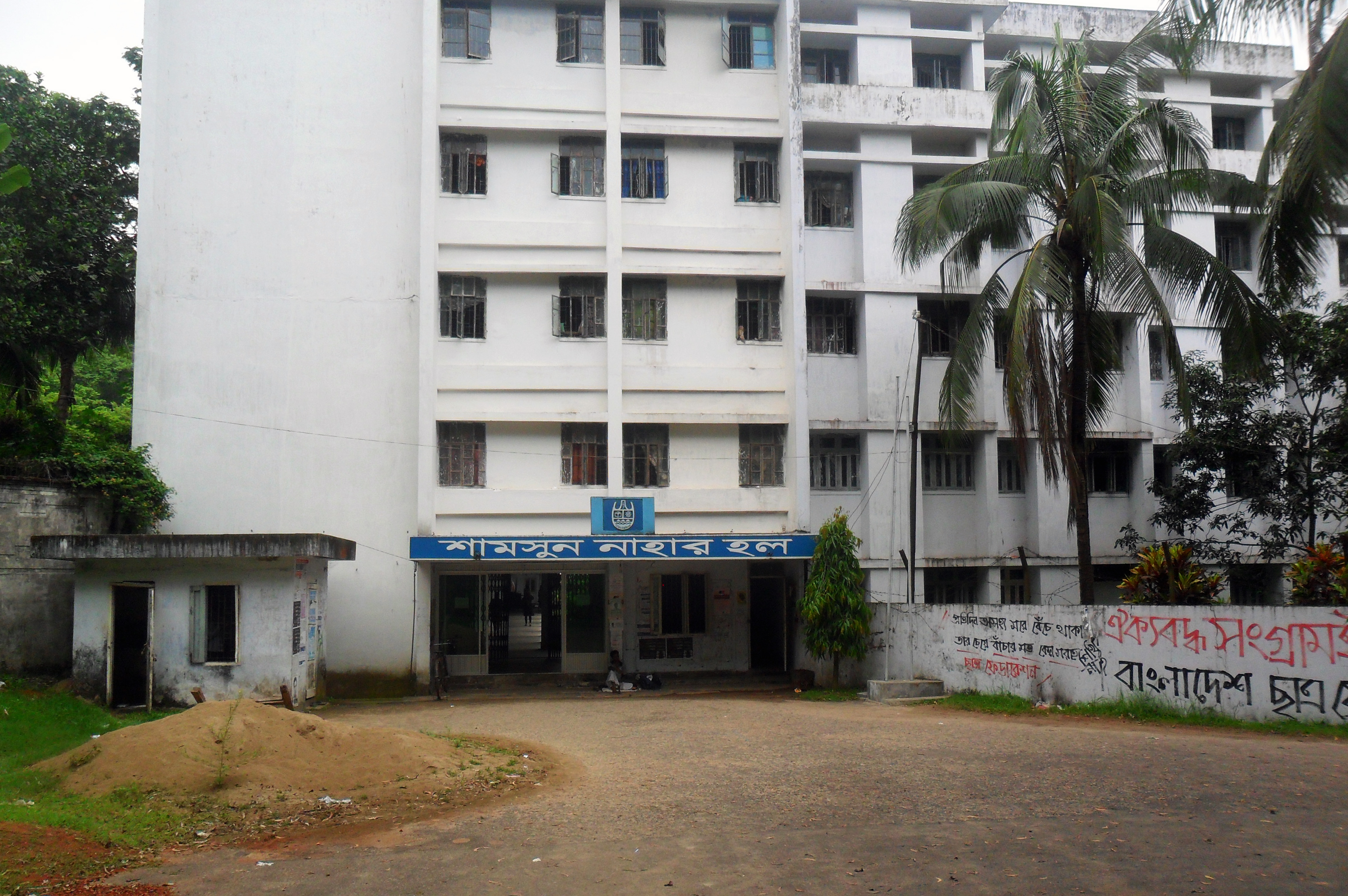
Shamsun Nahar Hall

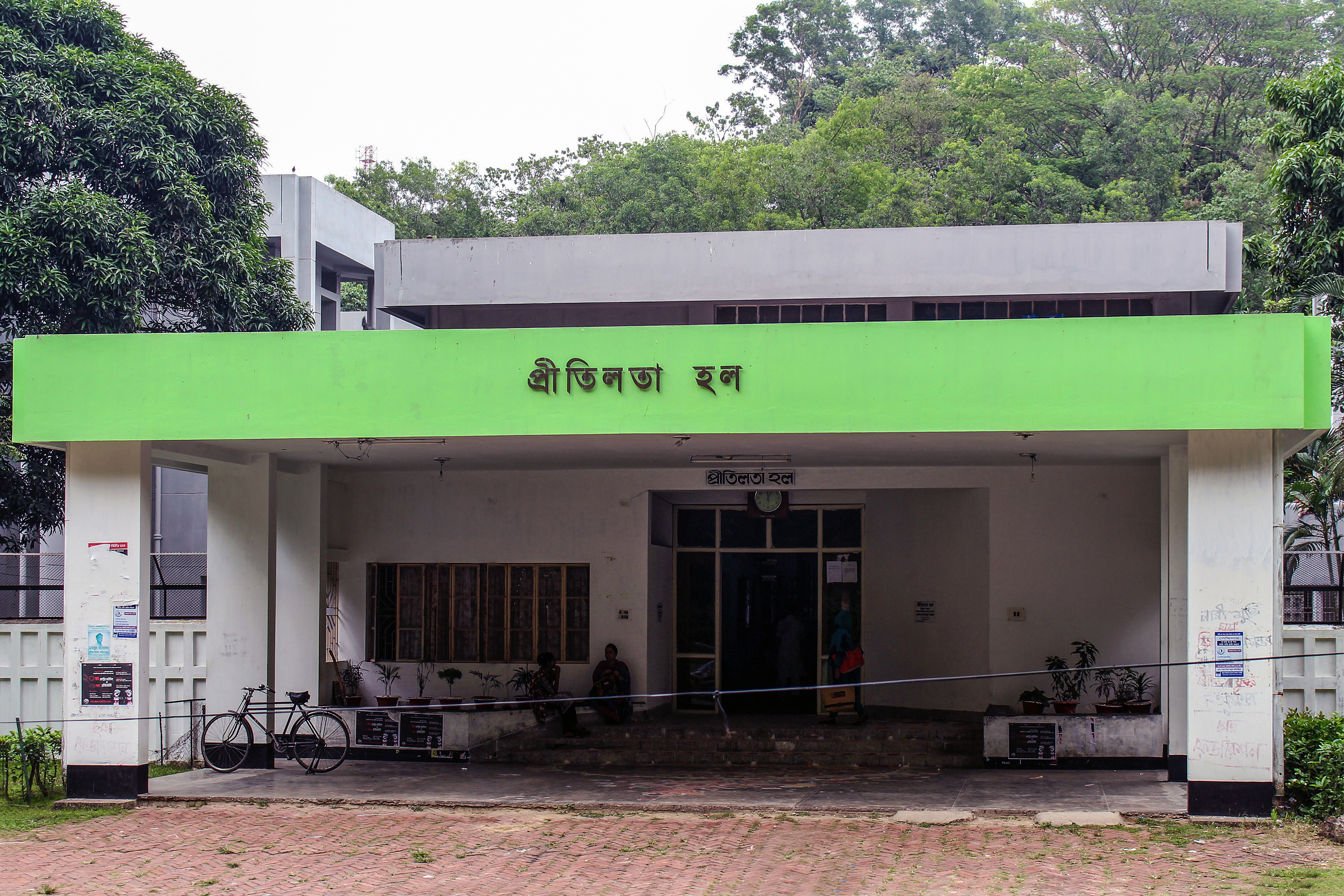
Pritilata Hall

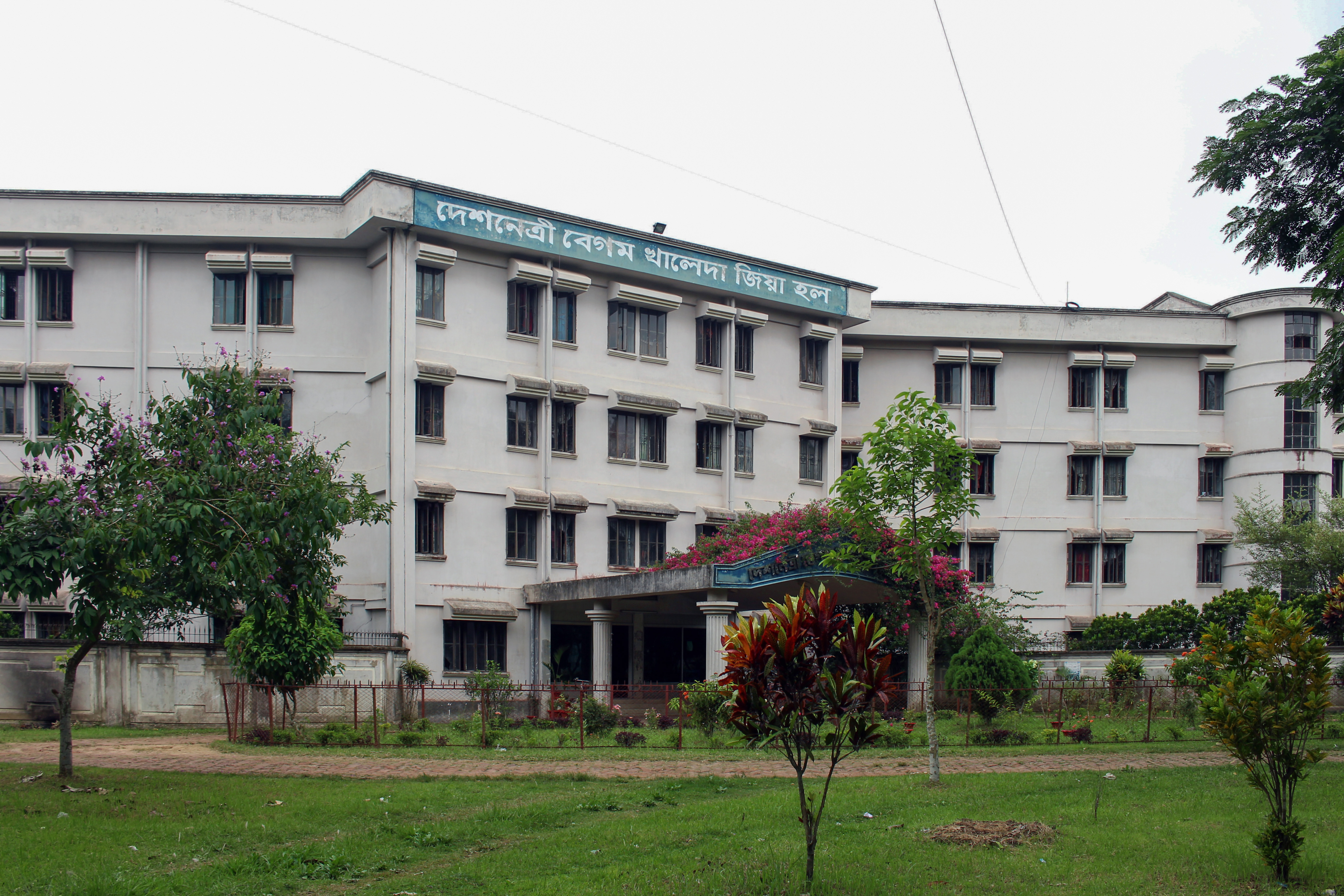
Deshnetri Begum Khaleda Zia Hall

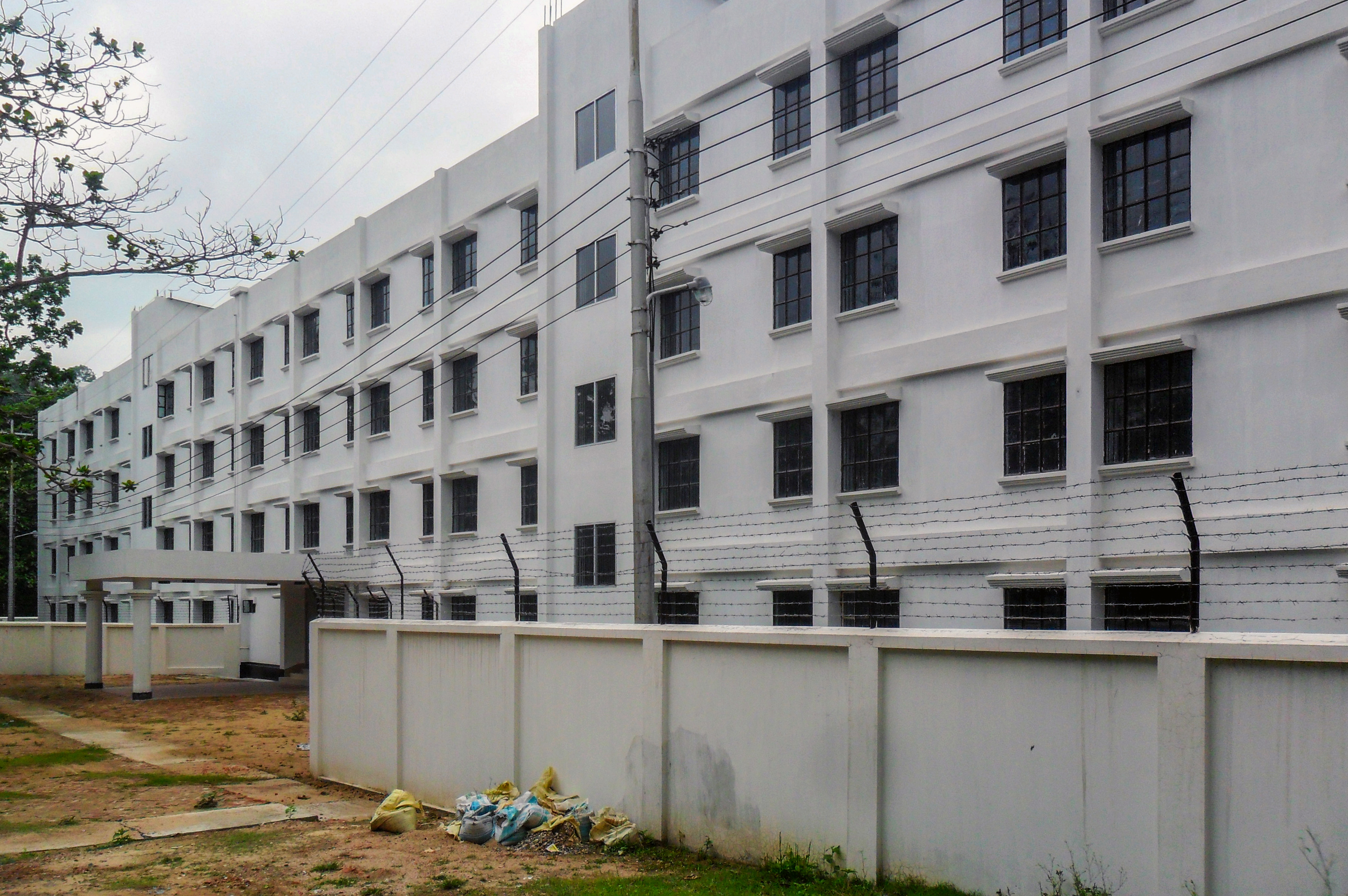
Bijoy 24 Hall

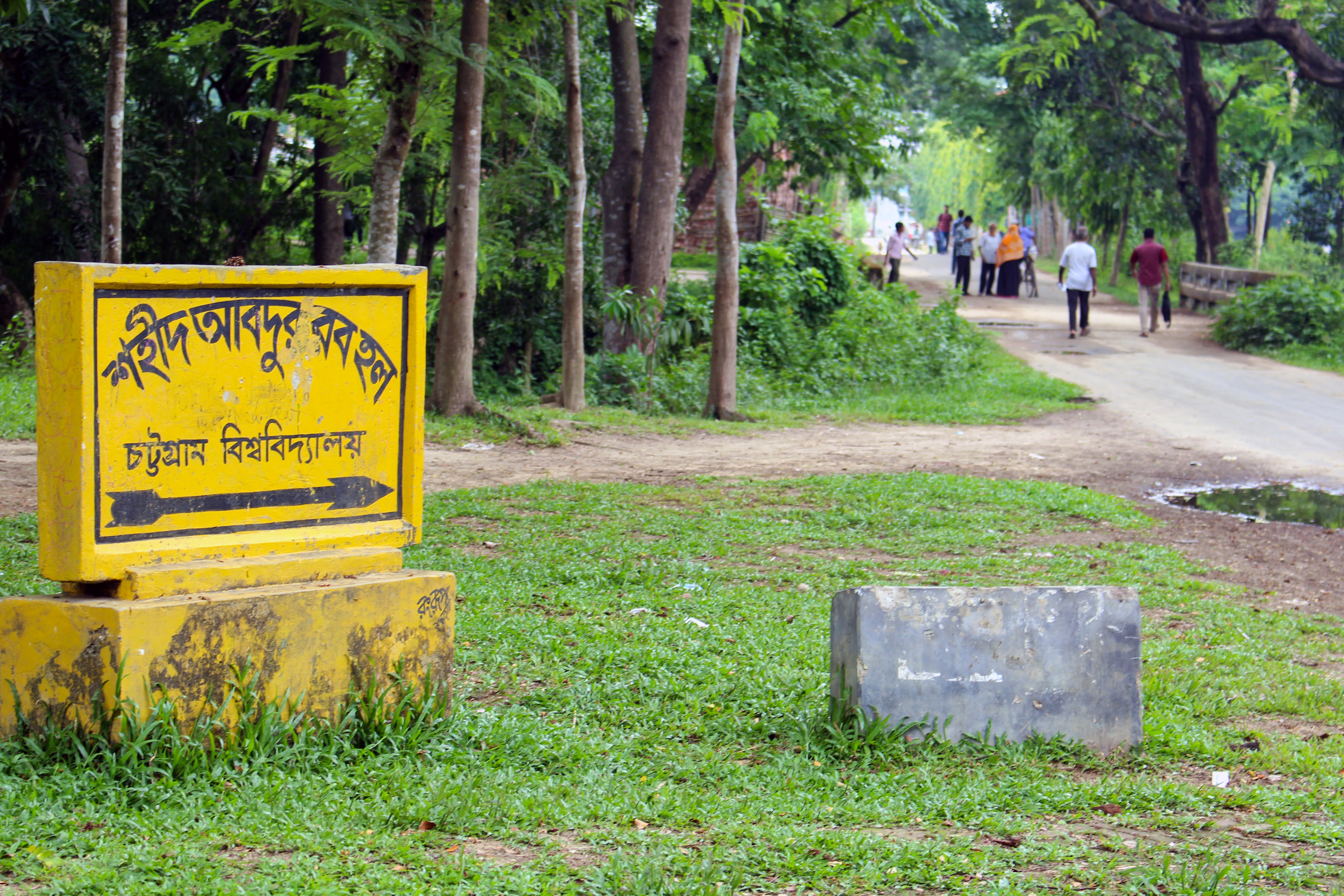
Shaheed Abdur Rab Hall

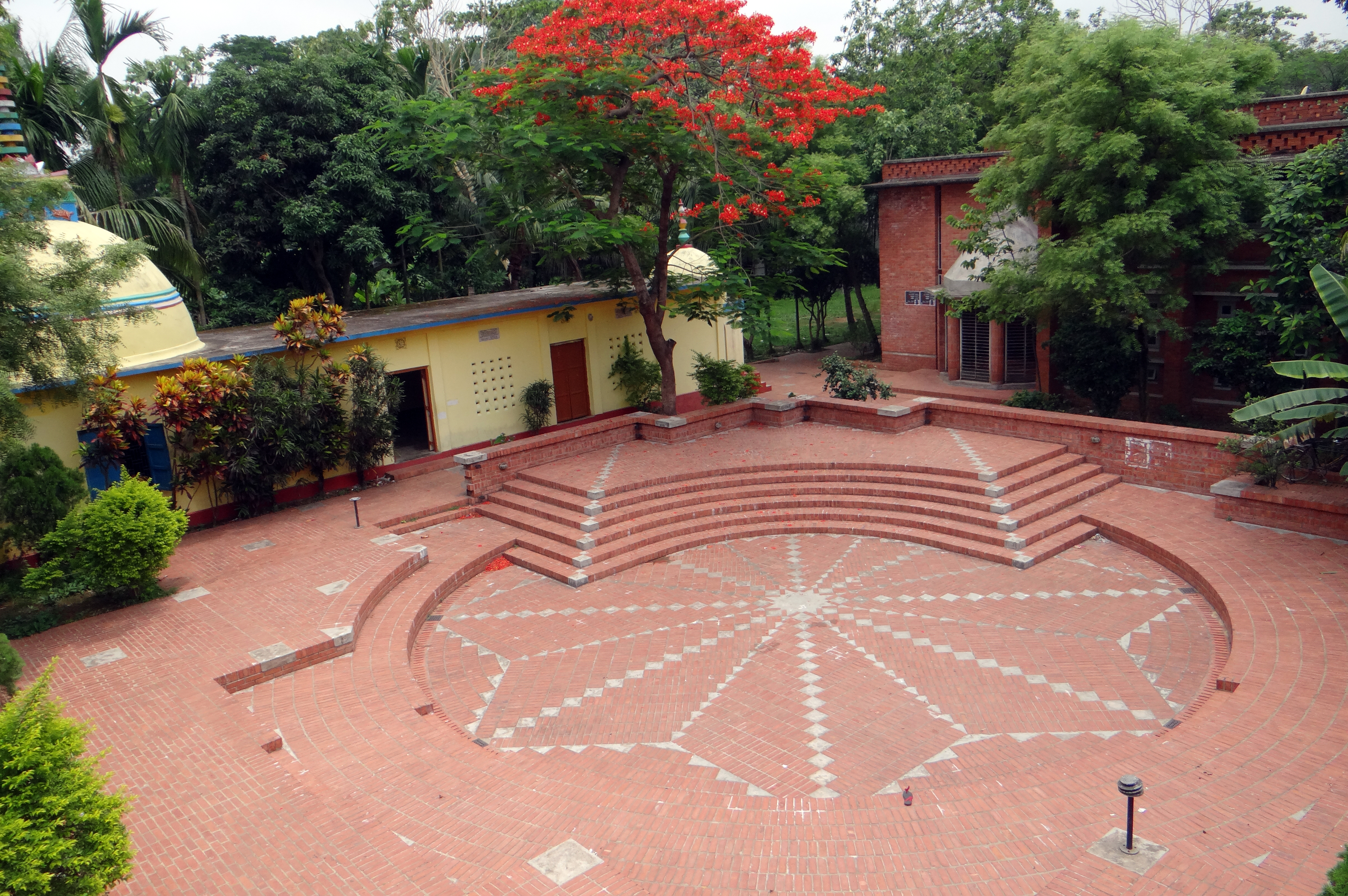
Govinda Gunalanker Hostel

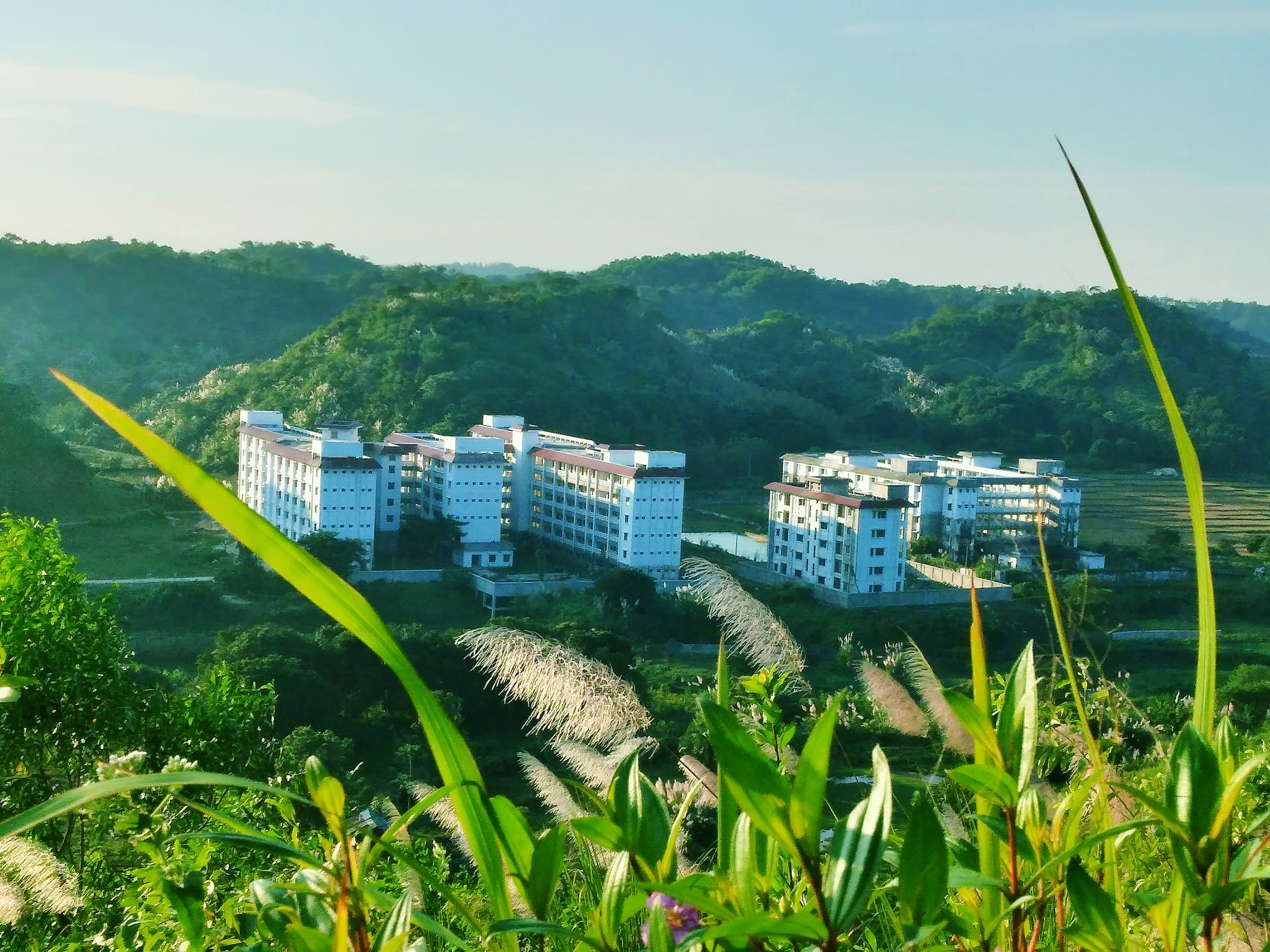
Shaheed Farhad Hossain Hall

Vice chancellors

A R Mallick	1966-1972
U N Siddiqui (Note: Acting)	1971-1972
M Innas Ali	1972-1973
Abul Fazal	1973-1975
Abdul Karim	1975-1981
M A Aziz Khan	1981-1985
Mohammad Ali	1985-1988
Alamgir Muhammad Serajuddin	1988-1991
Rafiqul Islam Chowdhury	1991-1996
Abdul Mannan	1996-2001
Fazle Hossain	2001-2002
A J M Nuruddin Chowdhury	2002-2006
Badiul Alam	2006-2009
Abu Yousuf	2009-2010
Alauddin	2010-2011
Anwarul Azim Arif	2011-2015
Emran Hossain	2013-2013
Iftekhar Uddin Chowdhury	2015-2019
Shireen Akhter	2019 - 19 March 2024
Md. Abu Taher	20 March 2024 - 12 August 2024
Muhammad Yeahia Akhter	September 2024 - March 2026
Mohammad Al-Forkan	March 2026 - Present

Pro Vice-chancellors

Md. Ali Imdad Khan	1987-1989
M. Badiul Alam	1991-1996
Abu Yousuf	1996-2001
Md. Anwarul Azim Arif	2001-2001
Mohammad Shamsuddin	2001-2005
Md. Alauddin	2009-2013
Iftekhar Uddin Chowdhury	2013-2015
Shireen Akhter	2016-2019
Benu Kumar Dey	2021 - August 2024
M. Sekander Chowdhury	March 2024 - August 2024
Mohammed Shamim Uddin Khan	September 2024 - June 2026
Md. Kamal Uddin	September 2024 - June 2026
Mohammed Al-Amin	June 2026 - Present
Md. Safiqul Islam	June 2026 - Present

== Notable faculty and alumni members ==
=== Faculty ===
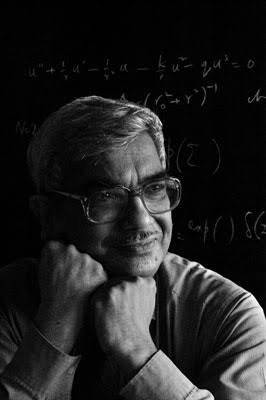
Jamal Nazrul Islam

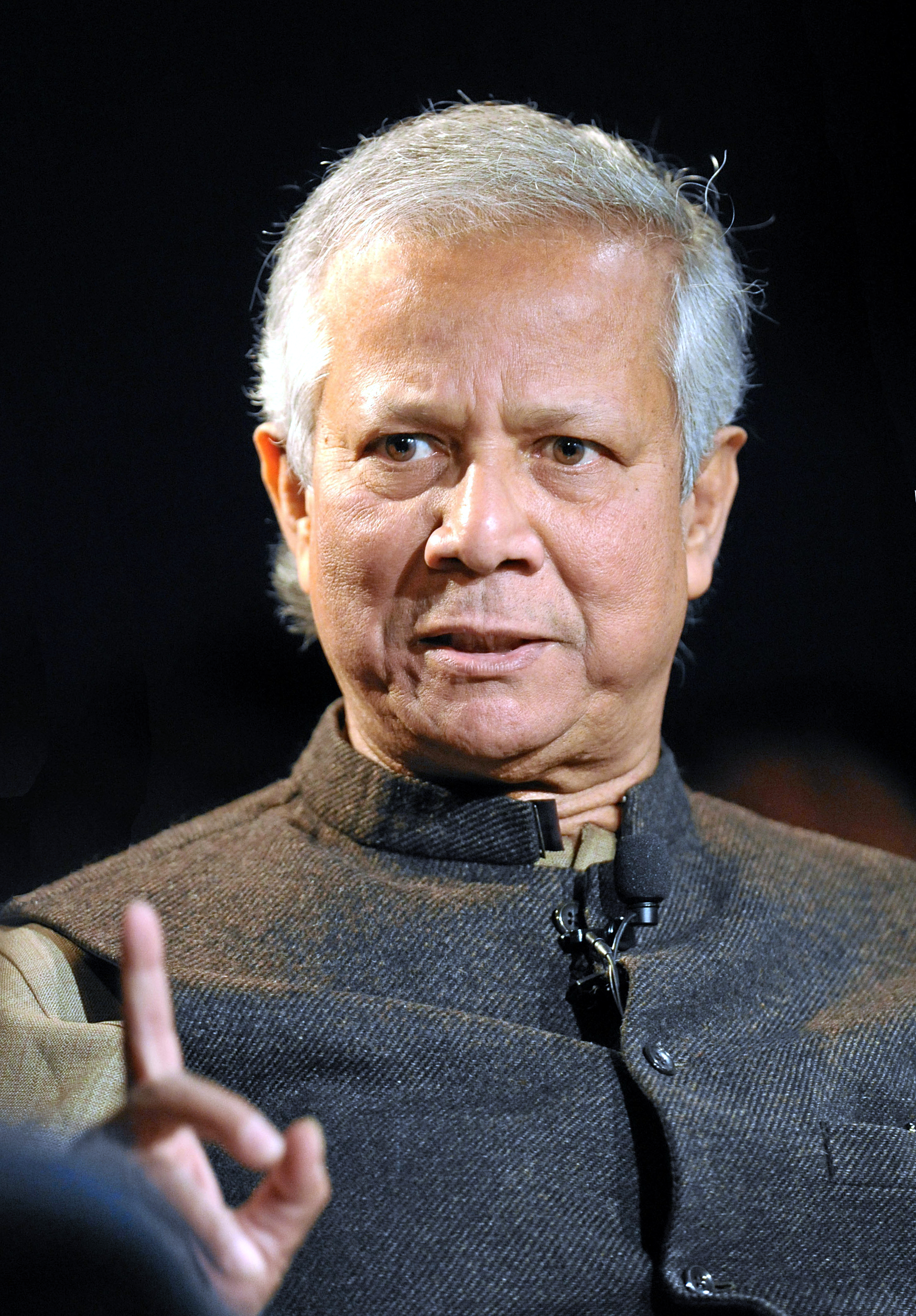
Muhammad Yunus

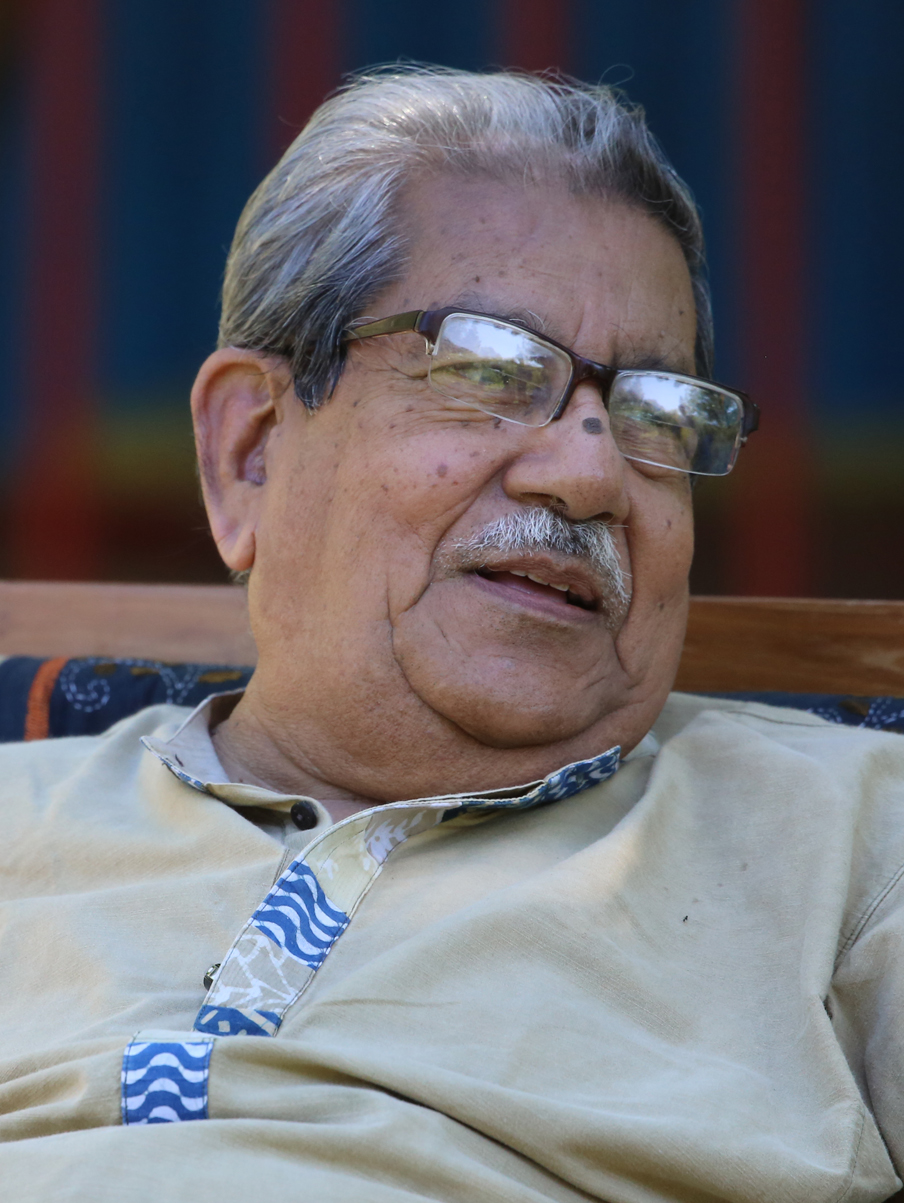
Anisuzzaman

- Jamal Nazrul Islam, theoretical physicist and mathematician
- Muhammad Yunus, founder of Grameen Bank and Nobel Prize winner & former Chief Advisor of Bangladesh
- Abdul Mannan, chairman, University Grants Commission of Bangladesh
- A F M Khalid Hossain, Islamic scholar
- Anisuzzaman, Bangladeshi academic of Bengali literature
- Murtaja Baseer, painter and artist
- Mohammad Shah Alam, chairman (acting) of the Bangladesh Law Commission and founding father of the Faculty of Law, University of Chittagong, and former professor at the Department of Law, University of Rajshahi
- Monsur Ul Karim, painter
- Syed Abdullah Khalid, sculptor and painter
- Abdul Karim, Bangladeshi historian
- Farzana Islam, former vice chancellor, Jahangirnagar University (former lecturer, Sociology department)

=== Alumni ===
- Niaz Ahmed Khan, academic and 30th vice chancellor of the University of Dhaka
- Aslam Chowdhury, fellow chartered accountant and politician
- Mahmood Hossain, academic and 12th vice chancellor of Khulna University
- Mohammad Muslim Chowdhury, Comptroller and Auditor General of Bangladesh
- Shireen Akhter, academic and former vice chancellor of the University of Chittagong
- Mohit Ul Alam, vice chancellor of Jatiya Kabi Kazi Nazrul Islam University
- Tahura Ali, politician and member of parliament
- Iftekhar Uddin Chowdhury, academic and vice-chancellor
- A B M Mohiuddin Chowdhury, politician and former mayor of Chittagong
- Mahmudul Islam Chowdhury, former mayor of Chittagong and member of parliament
- Rezaul Karim Chowdhury, politician and mayor of Chittagong
- Annisul Huq, entrepreneur, television show host and first mayor of North Dhaka
- Fazle Kabir, bureaucrat, economist and central banker
- Kazi Sharif Kaikobad, retired major general in the Bangladesh Army
- Hafiz Rashid Khan, postcolonialist poet, author, journalist and Adibaasi researcher
- Rashed Rouf, novelist, editor and journalist
- Surendra Kumar Sinha, lawyer who served as the 21st Chief Justice of Bangladesh
- AFM Solaiman Chowdhury, civil servant and chairman of the National Board of Revenue
- Wadud Bhuiyan, politician and former member of parliament
- Syed Abdullah Khalid, sculptor and painter
- Papri Basu, fighter, teacher, social worker and women's rights activist
- Muhammad Masum Aziz, stage, film and television actor
- Chitralekha Guho, television, stage and film actress
- Shahid Mahmud Jangi, lyricist
- Quadrat Elahi Rahman Shafique
- Partha Barua, singer and actor
- Naquib Khan, singer, music composer, lyricist and director
- Mahfuza Khatun, swimmer
- Muhammad Abdul Bari, physicist, writer, teacher, and community leader
- Ridwanul Hoque, a leading authority on Bangladeshi and South Asian constitutional law.
- A F M Khalid Hossain, Islamic scholar and Advisor of the Religious Affairs Ministry
- Selina Akhter, academic and lecturer, vice-chancellor of Rangamati Science and Technology University

== Gallery ==
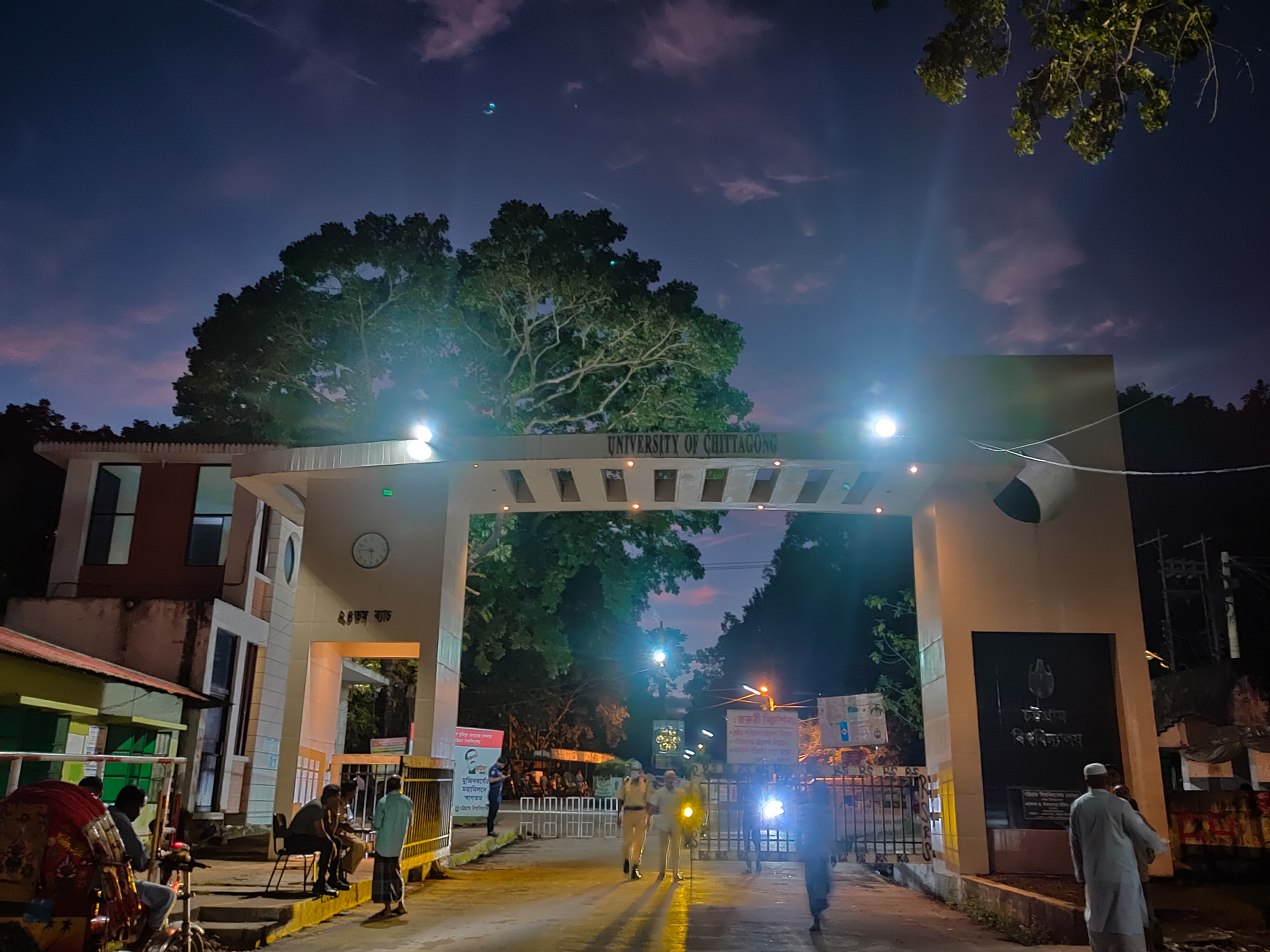
Main entrance

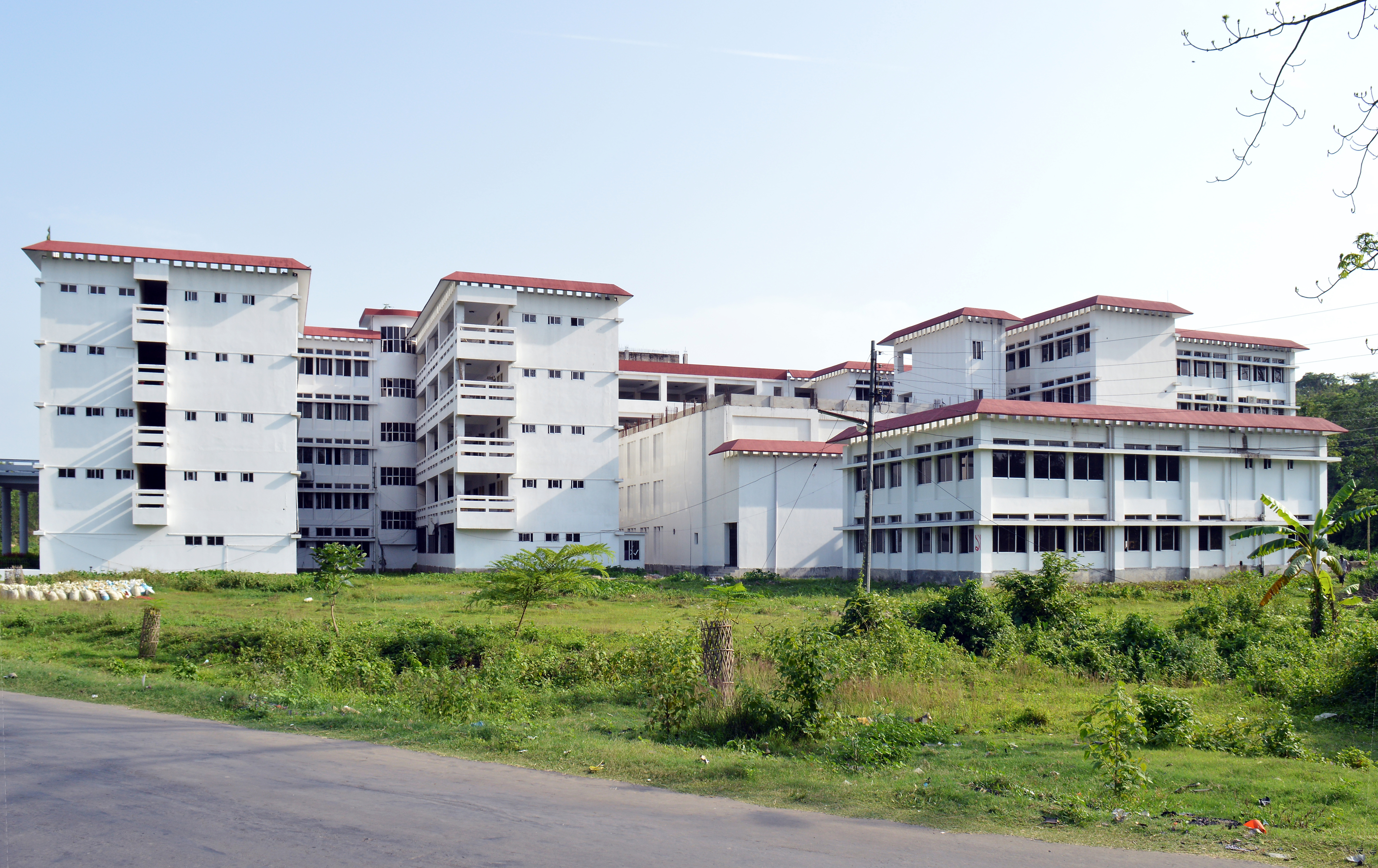
Faculty of Biological Sciences

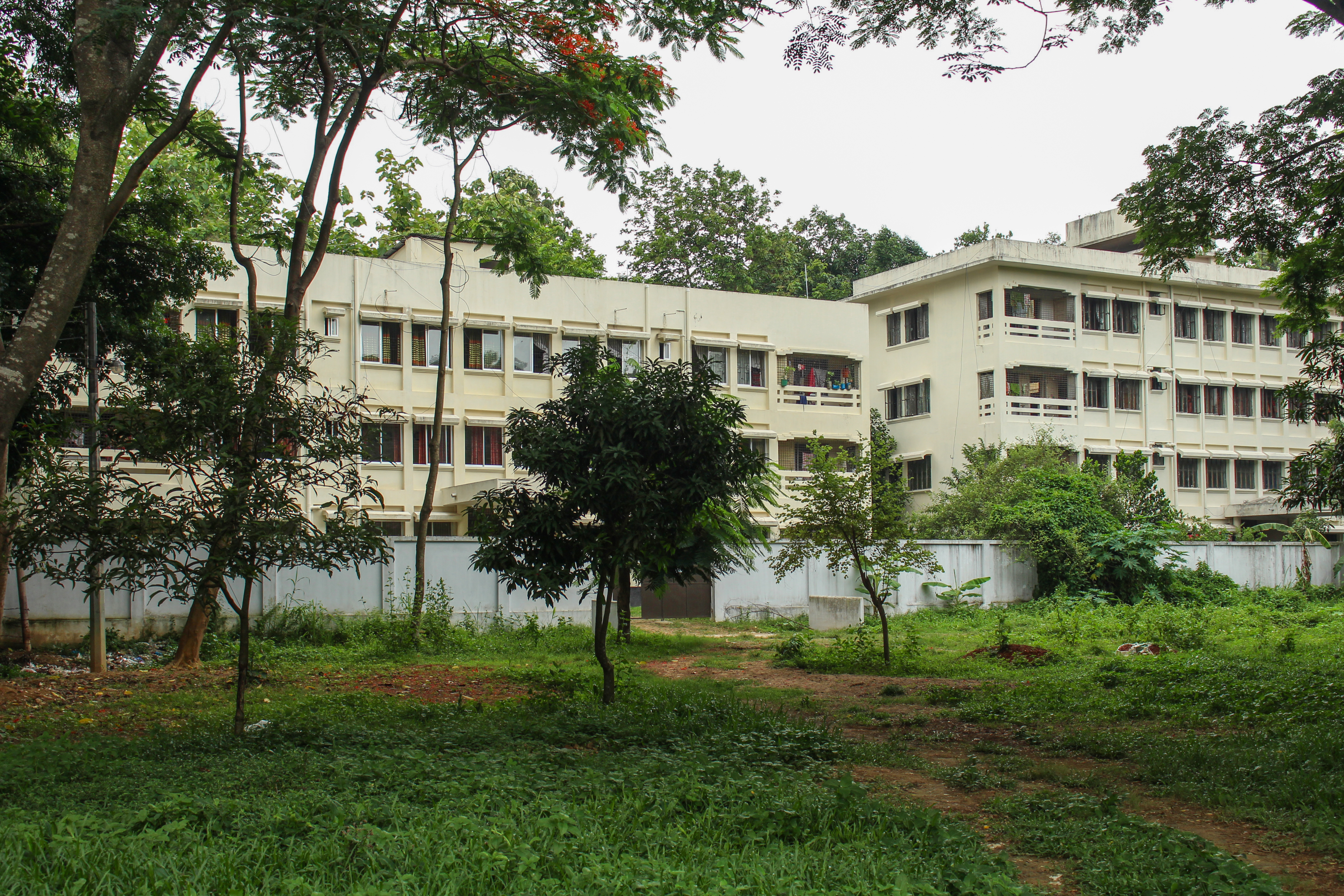
Teachers' dormitory

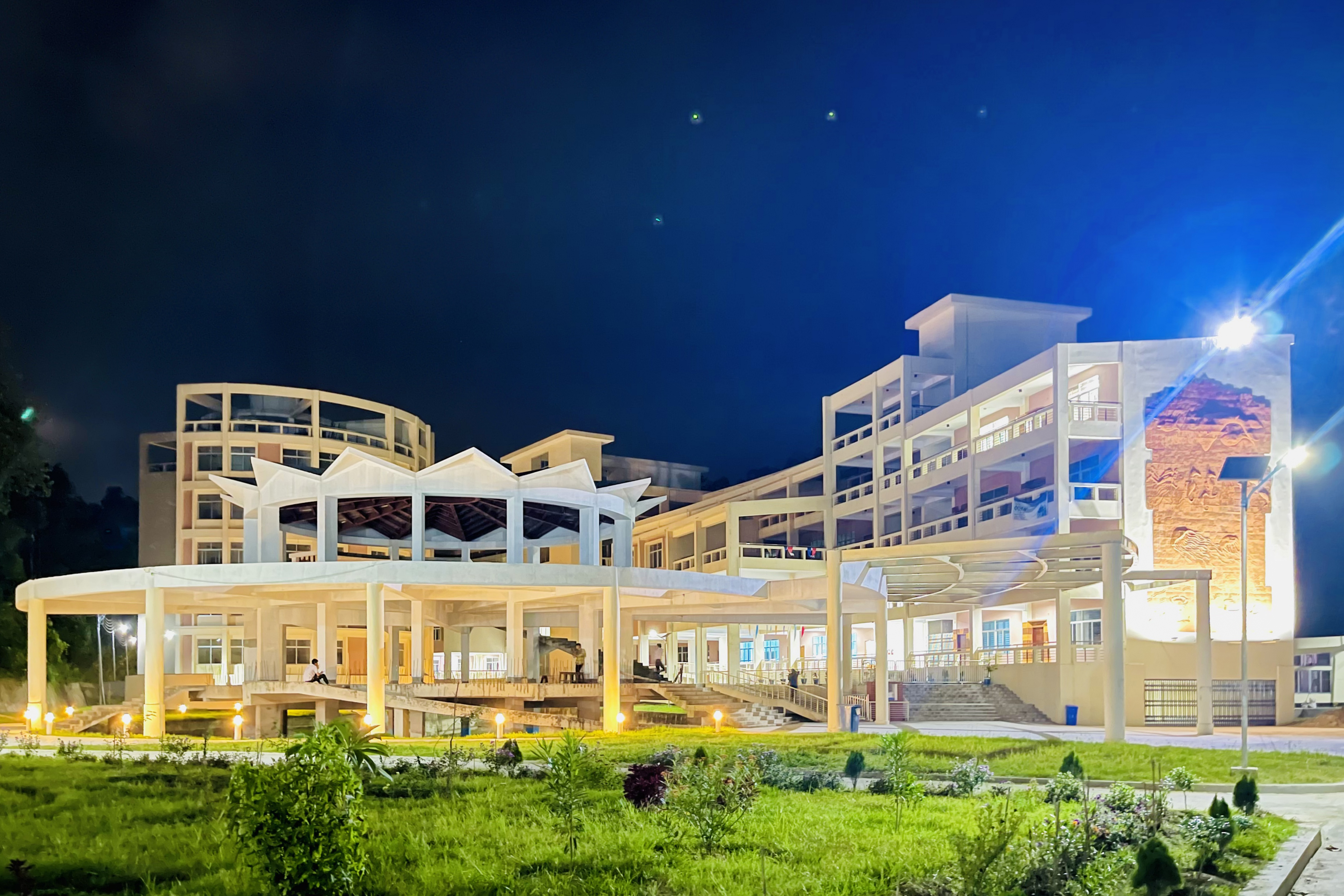
Faculty of Marine Sciences and Fisheries

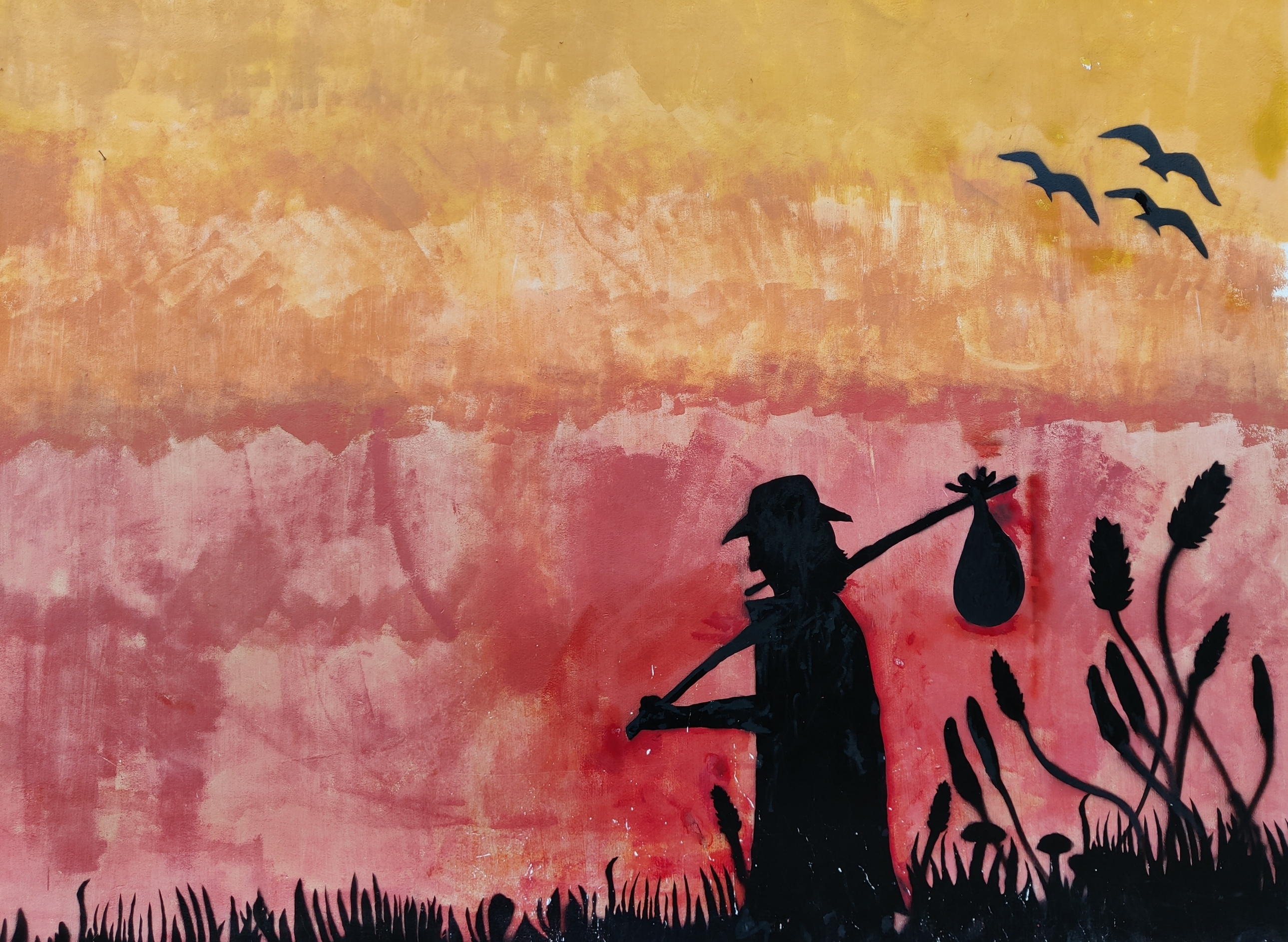
Graffiti of Chittagong University
