= Ridwanul Hoque =

Bangladeshi legal scholar

Ridwanul Hoque is a Bangladeshi legal scholar specializing in constitutional law, comparative public law, citizenship, and judicial review. He is a former Professor of Law at the University of Dhaka and has written extensively on constitutionalism, democratic governance, citizenship, and judicial activism in Bangladesh and South Asia.

== Education ==
Hoque obtained an LLB (Honours) and LLM from the University of Chittagong. He subsequently earned an LLM from the University of Cambridge and completed a PhD in comparative public law at SOAS University of London as a Commonwealth Scholar. His doctoral research focused on judicial activism in Bangladesh.

== Career ==
Hoque began his academic career at the University of Chittagong before joining the Faculty of Law at the University of Dhaka, where he became Professor of Law.

He has held visiting academic appointments and fellowships at several institutions, including Cornell Law School, Melbourne Law School, La Trobe University, and National Law University, Delhi. He has also been affiliated with the College of Indigenous Futures, Arts and Society at Charles Darwin University. His scholarship on citizenship and denationalisation has also been associated with the Global Citizenship Observatory project of the European University Institute.

== Public commentary ==
Hoque has commented on constitutional and political developments in Bangladesh. In a 2023 interview with Prothom Alo, he argued that constitutional amendments had often reflected the interests of governing parties rather than broad democratic consensus and expressed skepticism regarding the prospects for free and fair elections under prevailing political conditions. In another interview, he discussed constitutional reform proposals and democratic transition in Bangladesh, emphasizing the importance of constitutional continuity and judicial independence.

Following the political developments that began in 2024, Hoque commented extensively on proposals for constitutional reform, including debates over the July Charter, the structure of constitutional amendment procedures, and the role of elected institutions in constitutional change. In February 2026, he criticised the proposed Constitution Reform Council, describing it as lacking a clear legal basis and arguing that constitutional reform should remain within the authority of an elected parliament.

== Selected works ==
=== Books ===
- Judicial Activism in Bangladesh: A Golden Mean Approach (Cambridge Scholars Publishing, 2011).
- Constitutional Foundings in South Asia (Hart Publishing, 2021), co-edited with Kevin Y. L. Tan.
- A History of the Constitution of Bangladesh: The Founding, Development, and Way Ahead (Routledge, 2022), co-edited with Rokeya Chowdhury.

=== Selected chapters and articles ===
- "The Judicialization of Politics in Bangladesh", in Unstable Constitutionalism: Law and Politics in South Asia (Cambridge University Press, 2015).
- "The Founding and Making of Bangladesh's Constitution", in Constitutional Foundings in South Asia (2021).
- "The Politics of Unconstitutional Amendments in Bangladesh", in The Law and Politics of Unconstitutional Amendments in Asia (2022).
- "Bangladesh at a Constitutional Crossroads: Reform or Overhaul?" (2025).
