= M Innas Ali =

Bangladeshi physicist (1916–2010)

- Born: September 1, 1916; Barhatta, Netrokona, Bengal Presidency, British India
- Died: May 3, 2010 (aged 93); Shyamoli, Dhaka, Bangladesh
- Resting place: Banani Graveyard, Dhaka
- Education: University of Dhaka; New York University; London University

M Innas Ali (September 1, 1916 – May 3, 2010) was a Bangladeshi physicist. He was the founding chairman of Bangladesh Atomic Energy Commission. He was selected National Professor of Bangladesh in 1994.

== Education ==
Ali completed his M.Sc. in Physics from University of Dhaka in 1940. Later he earned M.E.E. from New York University and Ph.D. in nuclear physics from London University in 1948 and 1955 respectively.

== Career ==
Ali served as the president of Bangladesh Academy of Sciences and vice chancellor of University of Chittagong.

== Awards ==
- Independence Day Award for Science and Technology (1991)
