= Badiul Alam =

Bangladeshi academic

Muhammad Badiul Alam

Vice Chancellor of the University of Chittagong
- In office 8 February 2006 – 24 February 2009
- Preceded by: A J M Nuruddin Chowdhury
- Succeeded by: Abu Yusuf

Personal details
- Born: 28 February 1949 (age 77) North Nolbila, Maheshkhali, Cox's Bazar, East Bengal, Dominion of Pakistan
- Education: PhD
- Alma mater: University of Delhi
- Occupation: Academic

Muhammad Badiul Alam (born 28 February 1949) is a Bangladeshi academic who served as the 13th vice chancellor of the University of Chittagong.

== Early life and education ==
Alam was born in Maheshkhali, Cox's Bazar district, in 1949. He completed his undergraduate degree at the Chittagong Government College and his M.A. in political science at the University of Dhaka in 1969. He obtained a second M.A. in political science at the University of Waterloo, Canada, in 1977. He did his PhD in political science at the University of Delhi, India, in 1986.

Alam served as dean and head of the Department of Political Science at the University of Chittagong and was the president of the Bangladesh Political Science Association.

== Career ==
M. Badiul Alam began his academic career as a lecturer in political science at the University of Chittagong in 1971. He became department chairman in 1980 and was promoted to professor in 1987.

He was elected dean of the Faculty of Social Sciences in 1988 and was pro-vice-chancellor in 1991. In 2006, he was appointed vice chancellor of the University of Chittagong. During his tenure, he initiated efforts to integrate technology into education, incorporating new technologies in education in order to "survive in the competitive world". He was replaced by Yusuf Alam in 2009, before completing a four-year tenure.

Alam was president of the Bangladesh Political Science Association from 1990 to 1992. He has served as executive editor of Chittagong University Studies, as a member of the editorial board of Bangladesh Political Studies, and as a member of the advisory board of the Bangladesh Research Foundation Journal. In 1984, he was a fellow at the International Centre for Asian Studies in Hong Kong. He had previously been a visiting fellow at the Indian Council of Social Science Research in New Delhi, India.

His areas of study include governance in South and Southeast Asia, social change and development, comparative political systems, democracy and authoritarianism, and globalization.

=== 2009 University of Chittagong strike ===
In 2009, the Bangladesh Chhatra League demanded Badiul's resignation as vice-chancellor, stating that the VC had "failed to ensure the co-existence of all student bodies and their security on campus". BCL-affiliated students also accused him of patronizing Bangladesh Islami Chhatra Shibir and of corruption, calling a two-day strike. Badiul termed the demands and accusations "irrational" and that BCL had no right to demand his resignation. Following the disturbances, Badiul appointed new proctors to enforce disciplinary measures.

== Awards and accolades ==
Alam received a gold medal for Bangladesh in 2006 and an Order of International Ambassadors (OIA) Medal in 2008 from the now-defunct vanity award publisher American Biographical Institute for his contributions to social and educational development in Bangladesh. The American Biographical Institute has been previously denounced as a scam organization that sells its awards.

== Thesis, dissertations and publications ==
1. Alam, M. Badiul (1985). Democracy and Authoritarianism in New States: The Case of Bangladesh (Ph.D. thesis). New Delhi: Department of Political Science, University of Delhi.
2. Alam, Mohammad Badiul (Fall 1977). "The Concept of Non-Alignment: A Critical Analysis". World Affairs. 140 (2): 166–185. JSTOR 20671723.
3. Alam, Muhammad Badiul (September 1980). "Contemporary Ideas and Theories of Nationalism". The Indian Journal of Political Science. 41 (3): 367–378. ISSN 0019-5510. JSTOR 41855037.
