= List of vice-chancellors of the University of Chittagong =

Vice-Chancellor University of Chittagong

The post of Vice Chancellor of University of Chittagong was established in 1966 as the third public university of former East Pakistan (now Bangladesh), has been held since its inception. Located on a sprawling 1,754-acre hilly campus in Hathazari, 22 kilometres north of Chittagong city, the university first vice-chancellor was Dr. Azizur Rahman Mallick. Mohammad Al-Forkan is the current Vice-Chancellor of the University of Chittagong.

== Vice-chancellors of the University of Chittagong ==
The following is a chronological list of vice-chancellors of the University of Chittagong since its establishment in 1966.

No.	Name	Term	Tenure	Notes
1	Dr. Azizur Rahman Mallick	1 October 1966 – 31 January 1972	5 years, 4 months	Founding Vice-Chancellor
2	Dr. U. N. Siddiqui	21 April 1971 – 30 January 1972	~9 months	Acting Vice-Chancellor
3	Dr. M. Innas Ali	1 February 1972 – 18 April 1973	1 year, 2 months	
4	Professor Abul Fazal	19 April 1973 – 27 November 1975	2 years, 7 months	
5	Professor Abdul Karim	28 November 1975 – 18 April 1981	5 years, 5 months	
6	Professor M. A. Aziz Khan	19 April 1981 – 18 April 1985	4 years	
7	Professor Mohammad Ali	19 April 1985 – 22 May 1988	3 years, 1 month	
8	Dr. Alamgir Muhammad Serajuddin	23 May 1988 – 29 December 1991	3 years, 7 months	
9	Dr. Rafiqul Islam Chowdhury	30 December 1991 – 6 November 1996	4 years, 10 months	
10	Professor Abdul Mannan	6 November 1996 – 13 February 2001	4 years, 3 months	
11	Professor Md. Fazle Hossain	14 February 2001 – 2 February 2002	~11 months	
12	Professor A. J. M. Nuruddin Chowdhury	2 February 2002 – 2 February 2006	4 years	
13	Dr. M. Badiul Alam	8 February 2006 – 24 February 2009	3 years	
14	Dr. Abu Yousuf	25 February 2009 – 28 November 2010	1 year, 9 months	
15	Dr. Mohammad Alauddin	9 December 2010 – 14 June 2011	~6 months	Acting Vice-Chancellor
16	Professor Anwarul Azim Arif	15 June 2011 – 14 June 2015	4 years	
17	Dr. Iftekhar Uddin Chowdhury	15 June 2015 – 12 June 2019	4 years	
18	Dr. Shireen Akhter	13 June 2019 – 19 March 2024	4 years, 9 months	
19	Dr. Md. Abu Taher	20 March 2024 – 12 August 2024	~5 months	
20	Dr. Muhammad Yeahia Akhter	20 September 2024 – 16 March 2026	1 year, 5 months, 24 days	
21	Dr. Mohammad Al-Forkan	16 March 2026 – Present	Incumbent	Incumbent
