= Farhad Hossain =

Farhad Hossain may refer to:

- Farhad Hossain (cricketer) (born 1987), Bangladeshi cricketer
- Farhad Hossain (politician) (born 1972, Bangladeshi politician
- Farhad Hossain Azad (born 1966), Bangladeshi politician
- Bodruddoza Md. Farhad Hossain (born 1971), Bangladeshi politician

== See also ==
- Forhad Hussain, British politician
- Md. Forhad Hossain, Bangladeshi academic
