= Md. Fazle Hossain =

Bangladeshi academic (1938–2017)

Md Fazle Hossain
- Born: c. 1938
- Died: 11 September 2017; Chattogram, Bangladesh
- Occupation: Academic
- Employer: University of Chittagong
- Known for: Vice Chancellor of the University of Chittagong
- Title: Professor
- Term: 2001–2002
- Spouse: Yes
- Children: 6

Md Fazle Hossain (c. 1938 – 11 September 2017) was a Bangladeshi academic, professor of mathematics, and former Vice-Chancellor of the University of Chittagong.

== Early life and education ==
Hossain was active in politics during his student years. He participated in the Language Movement in 1952 and later served as the general secretary of the Dhaka University Central Students' Union 1957.

== Career ==
Hossain joined the Department of Mathematics at the University of Chittagong in 1968. Over the years, he held several academic and administrative positions, including Dean of the Faculty of Science and member of both the university’s Senate and Syndicate.

Hossain was appointed the 11th Vice Chancellor of the University of Chittagong in 2001 and served until 2002.

Outside the university, Hossain served as President of the Bangladesh Mathematical Association and the Biggyan Unnayan Samity (Science Development Association).

== Death ==
Hossain died at the age of 85 on a Sunday night in 2023 at a private hospital in Chittagong, Bangladesh. The University of Chittagong community, including current Vice Chancellor Dr. Iftekhar Uddin Chowdhury and Pro-Vice Chancellor Dr. Shireen Akhter, expressed condolences at his passing.
