= Mohammad Alauddin =

Bangladeshi university administrator

Acting Vice-Chancellor of the University of Chittagong
- In office 9 December 2010 – 14 June 2011
- Preceded by: Abu Yusuf
- Succeeded by: Anwarul Azim Arif

Vice-Chancellor of Mawlana Bhashani Science and Technology University
- In office 4 May 2013 – 3 May 2017
- Preceded by: M. Nurul Islam
- In office 29 July 2017 – 28 July 2021
- Succeeded by: Md. Forhad Hossain

Personal details
- Born: 1954 (age 71–72) Pabna District, East Bengal, Dominion of Pakistan
- Education: Jahangirnagar University; University of Delhi

Mohammad Alauddin (born 1954) is a Bangladeshi academic and university administrator. He served as the acting vice-chancellor of the University of Chittagong and was later appointed for two terms as vice-chancellor of Mawlana Bhashani Science and Technology University.

== Early life and education ==
Alauddin was born in 1954 in present-day Majnabari village, Kazipur Upazila, Sirajganj District, Bangladesh. He completed his bachelor's and master's in chemistry in 1976 and 1977, respectively, from Jahangirnagar University. He obtained his PhD in 1990 from Delhi University.

== Career ==
Alauddin began his academic career in 1981 as a lecturer in the Department of Chemistry at the University of Chittagong. He was promoted to professor in 1995. In 1997, he became the chairman of the university’s Department of Biochemistry and Molecular Biology.

Alauddin served as acting vice-chancellor of the University of Chittagong from December 2010 to June 2011. He was serving as the pro-vice-chancellor before that.

On 4 May 2013, Alauddin was appointed vice-chancellor of Mawlana Bhashani Science and Technology University. He was reappointed for a second term on 27 July 2017 and formally assumed office on 29 July.

Alauddin has served as president of the Association of Universities of Bangladesh.
