= Md. Anwarul Azim Akhand =

Anwarul Azim Akhand
- আনোয়ারুল আজীম আখন্দ

Vice-chancellor of

Mawlana Bhashani Science and Technology University
- Incumbent
- Assumed office 21 September 2024
- Preceded by: Farhad Hossain

Personal details
- Born: 1966 (age 59–60) Muktagacha Upazila, Mymensingh District, Bangladesh
- Education: University of Dhaka; Nagoya University
- Occupation: Professor, university administrator

Anwarul Azim Akhand (born 1966) is a Bangladeshi professor. He is a professor of the Department of Genetic Engineering and Biotechnology, University of Dhaka and the current vice-chancellor of Mawlana Bhashani Science and Technology University.

== Early life and education ==
Anwarul Azim was born in 1966 at Muktagacha in Mymensingh district. He obtained his bachelor's and master's degrees in 1986 and 1987 respectively from the Department of Biochemistry, University of Dhaka. He then took Monbusho to Japan and received his Ph.D. in immunology from Nagoya University in 1998.

== Career ==
Azim Akhand is a research resident at the Department of Immunology, Nagoya University from 1998 to 2000 and He served as an assistant professor from 2000 to 2002. He then returned to Bangladesh and In 2002, he joined the Department of Genetic Engineering and Biotechnology, University of Dhaka as an assistant professor. He was promoted to associate professor in 2005 and He served as chairman of the same department from 2005 to 2008. He was promoted to professor in the department in 2011. On 18 September 2024, he was appointed as the vice-chancellor of Mawlana Bhashani Science and Technology University and on 21 September 2024 officially took office.
