= Mohammad Ali (academic) =

Bangladeshi academic (1934–2021)

Vice-Chancellor of the University of Chittagong
- In office 19 April 1985 – 22 May 1988
- Preceded by: M. A. Aziz Khan
- Succeeded by: Alamgir Muhammad Serajuddin

Personal details
- Born: 1934 Chittagong District, Bengal Presidency, British India
- Died: June 2021 (aged 86–87)
- Children: 1
- Education: University of Oxford

Mohammad Ali (1934 – 24 June 2021) was a Bangladeshi academic and university administrator. He served as Vice-Chancellor of the University of Chittagong from 1985 to 1988. He was also Vice-Chancellor of three private universities: International Islamic University Chittagong, Northern University Bangladesh, and Southern University, Bangladesh.

== Early life and education ==
Ali was born in 1934 in Paindong, Chittagong District, Bengal Presidency, British India (present-day Fatikchhari Upazila, Bangladesh). He studied at the University of Oxford.

== Career ==
Ali was a professor in the Department of English at the University of Chittagong and served as the founding head of the department. Throughout his career, he held several administrative roles, including member of the Senate and Syndicate, Dean of the Faculty of Arts and Humanities, and member of the University Grants Commission (Bangladesh).

Ali served as Vice-Chancellor of the University of Chittagong from 19 April 1985 to 22 May 1988. After his tenure there, he went on to serve as Vice-Chancellor of three private universities: International Islamic University Chittagong, Northern University Bangladesh, and Southern University, Bangladesh.

Ali wrote several books on English literature and contemporary politics. He also served as one of the editors of the dictionary published by the Bangla Academy.

== Death ==
Ali died in Chittagong on 24 June 2021 at the age of 86.
