= Mohammad Al-Forkan =

Bangladeshi academic (born 1968)

- মোহাম্মদ আল ফোরকান

21st Vice-chancellor of the University of Chittagong
- Incumbent
- Assumed office 16 March 2026
- Chancellor: President of Bangladesh
- Preceded by: Muhammad Yeahia Akhter

Personal details
- Born: 12 December 1968 (age 57) Hathazari, Bangladesh
- Education: University of Chittagong University of Nottingham
- Occupation: Academic
- Website: Official website

Mohammad Al-Forkan (born 12 December 1968) is a Bangladeshi academic who is serving as the vice-chancellor of the University of Chittagong since March 2026. Prior to his appointment, he was a professor at the same university and served as the founding chairman of its Department of Genetic Engineering and Biotechnology.

== Early life and education ==
Mohammad Al-Forkan was born in Fatehpur Union of Hathazari Upazila of the Chattogram District.

He completed his Bachelor of Science and Master of Science degrees in botany at the University of Chittagong. Afterward, he pursued doctoral studies in Genetic Engineering (Plant Science) at the University of Nottingham in the United Kingdom, where he earned his Ph.D.

Later in his career, he received additional research training abroad, including post-doctoral and visiting scientist positions in Canada and the United States.

== Career ==
He began his career as a lecturer in the Department of Botany in 1993, later rising to the rank of Professor in 2006. In October 2004, he became the Founder Chairman of the Department of Genetic Engineering and Biotechnology, a role he held until 2009 while continuing his tenure as a professor. His administrative contributions include serving as a House Tutor at Sowhroarddi and Shah Amanat Halls, and as the Provost of Shamsun Nahar Hall from 2004 to 2006.
