= Muhammad Yahya Akhtar =

Bangladeshi university administrator

Muhammad Yeahia Akhter PhD
- মুহাম্মদ ইয়াহ্ইয়া আখতার
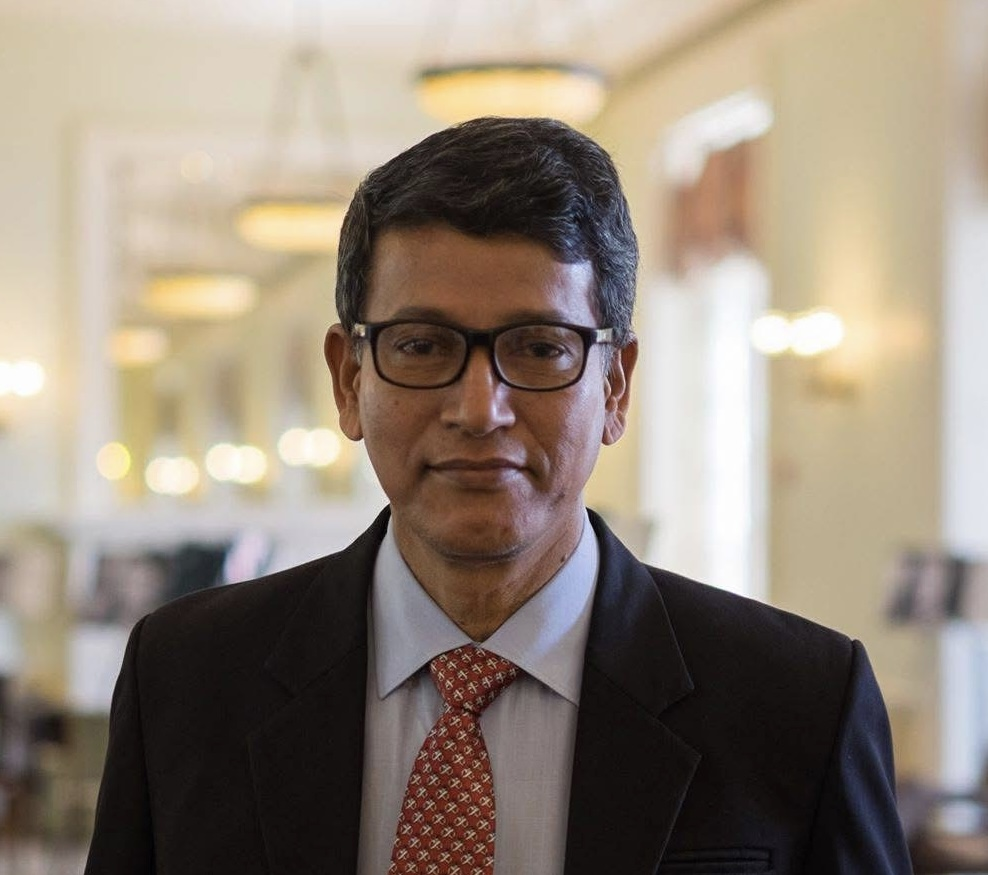
- Born: Dhaka, Bangladesh
- Occupations: Academic, Administrator
- Office: Vice Chancellor (2024-); Dean, Faculty of Education (2024-)

Academic background
- Education: University of Sydney; University of Waterloo; University of Rajshahi

Academic work
- Institutions: University of Chittagong
- Website: Official profile

Muhammad Yeahia Akhter is a Bangladeshi academic and university administrator. He has served as the Vice Chancellor of the University of Chittagong since September 2024.

== Early life and education ==
Akhter was born on 28 October 1957 in Dhaka, East Pakistan, Pakistan. He completed his Secondary School Certificate at St. Joseph’s High School, Khulna (1971–1972), and his Higher Secondary Certificate at M. M. City College, Khulna (1973–1974). He earned a B.A. (Honours) and M.A. in Political Science from the University of Rajshahi (1975–1979 and 1980–1981). He later obtained a Master of Arts in Political Science from the University of Waterloo (1988–1989), followed by a Ph.D. in Government and Public Administration from the University of Sydney (1994–1999).

Akhter doctoral dissertation was titled Elections and Electoral Corruption in Bangladesh: Civilian, Military & Non-Partisan Regimes in Perspective, and his Waterloo thesis examined the Socio‑political Impact of Administrative Decentralization: The Case of Bangladesh.

== Career ==
Akhter began his academic career as a Lecturer in the Department of Political Science at the University of Chittagong, serving from November 1982 to February 1986. He was then promoted to Assistant Professor in February 1986, a position he held until October 1992. From October 1992 to December 1999, he served as an Associate Professor. In December 1999, he was appointed Professor at the same department and continued in that role until October 2022.

Between Akhter's academic appointments, he also held several administrative roles, including at the University of Sydney. He worked there as an Administrative Assistant at the Central Records Office from October 1994 to August 1995, followed by a position as Enrolment Officer at the Student Centre from February to April 1997. He later served as a Higher Education Officer at the same centre from January to March 1998.

Returning to administrative roles at the University of Chittagong, he served as Chairman of the Department of Political Science from August 2015 to August 2018. He also chaired the department’s Self‑assessment Committee from August 2015 to June 2018.

After the fall of the Sheikh Hasina led Awami League government, students forced Vice Chancellor Md. Abu Taher and two Pro-Vice-Chancellors, Professor Benu Kumar Dey and Professor Sekandar Chowdhury, to resign accusing them of being aligned with the former government. In September 2024, he was appointed Vice Chancellor of the University of Chittagong and concurrently took on the role of Dean of the Faculty of Education. The interim government's likely appointment of Akhtar as Vice-Chancellor drew criticism from teachers and students, who argue he lacks administrative experience and did not support recent student movements. Critics question the rationale behind selecting a retired professor with limited engagement and leadership record. He hosted Chief Adviser Professor Muhammad Yunus for the 5th convocation of Chittagong University in may 2025.

On 4 July 2025, Akhtar faced heated protests in his office by student activists affiliated with the Islami Chhatra Shibir, Islami Chhatra Andolan, and the Ganatantrik Chhatra Sangsad. A four-minute video that went viral on social media captured students accusing the Vice-Chancellor of not attaining his position by merit, with one stating, "We appointed you, you are obliged to listen to us." The confrontation was reportedly sparked by the scheduled promotion interview of Kushal Baran Chakraborty, an assistant professor in the Sanskrit department, which some student groups opposed. Student leaders, including former Shibir leader Shakhawat Hossain and History postgraduate student Tahsan Habib, engaged in a verbal altercation with the Vice-Chancellor. In the video, the students accuse the Vice-Chancellor of promoting "friends of fascism" and "betraying the blood of martyrs." As a result of the incident the promotion of Kushal Baran Chakraborty was halted.

== See also ==
- Vice Chancellor of University of Chittagong
