= Mawlana Bhashani Science and Technology University =

Public university in Bangladesh

- মাওলানা ভাসানী বিজ্ঞান ও প্রযুক্তি বিশ্ববিদ্যালয়
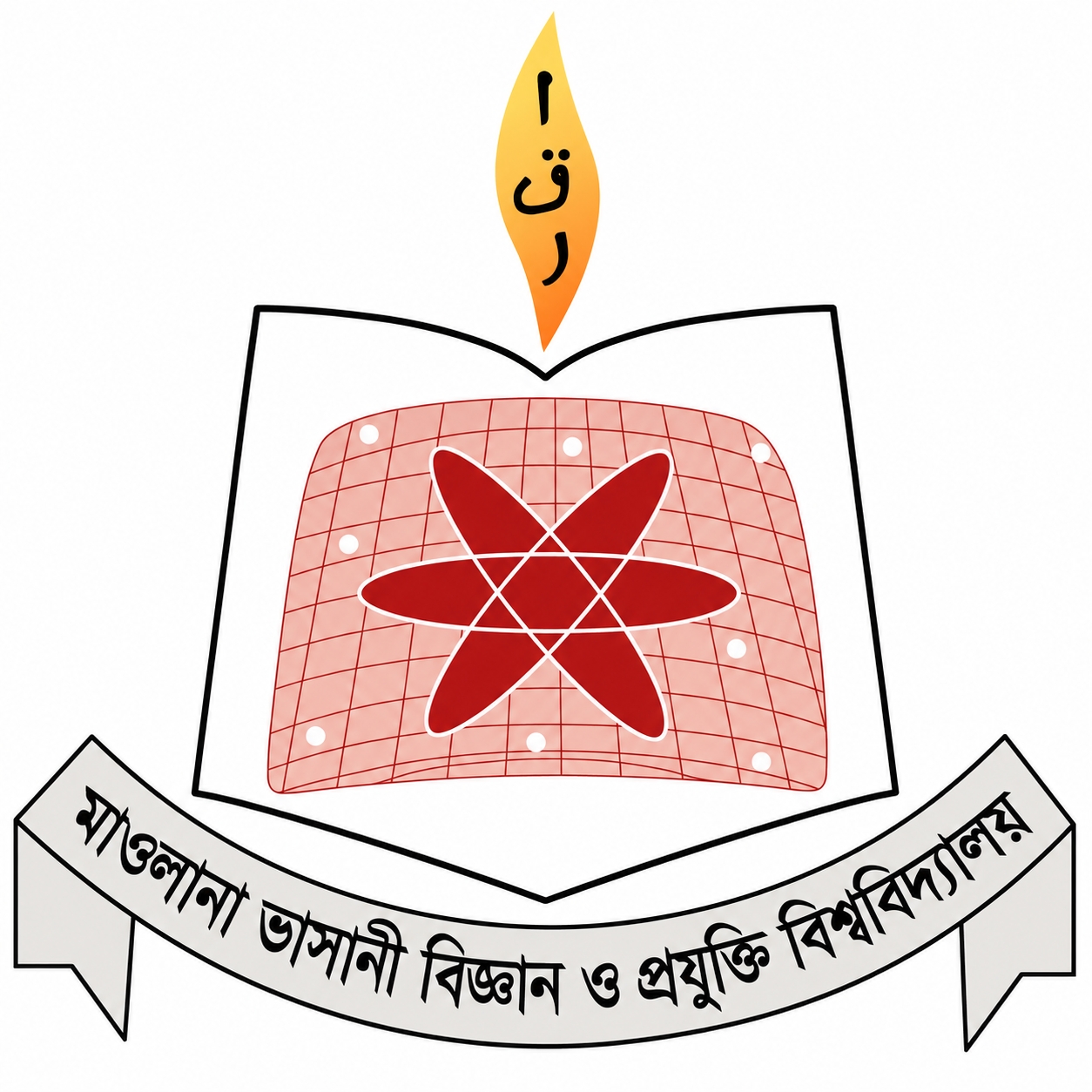
- Logo of MBSTU
- Other name: MBSTU
- Type: Public
- Established: 1999; 27 years ago
- Founder: Government of Bangladesh
- Accreditation: IEB; ITET; PCB
- Affiliations: UGC
- Chancellor: President Mirza Fakhrul Islam Alamgir
- Vice-Chancellor: Professor Dr. ABM Shahidul Islam
- Academic staff: 243
- Administrative staff: 190
- Students: 5671
- Undergraduates: 4000
- Postgraduates: 1671
- Location: Santosh, Tangail, 1902, Bangladesh; 24.2352°N 89.8918°E
- Campus: Main Campus 70.69 acres (28.61 ha), Sirajganj Campus 10 acres (4.0 ha).
- Language: Bengali, English
- Website: mbstu.ac.bd
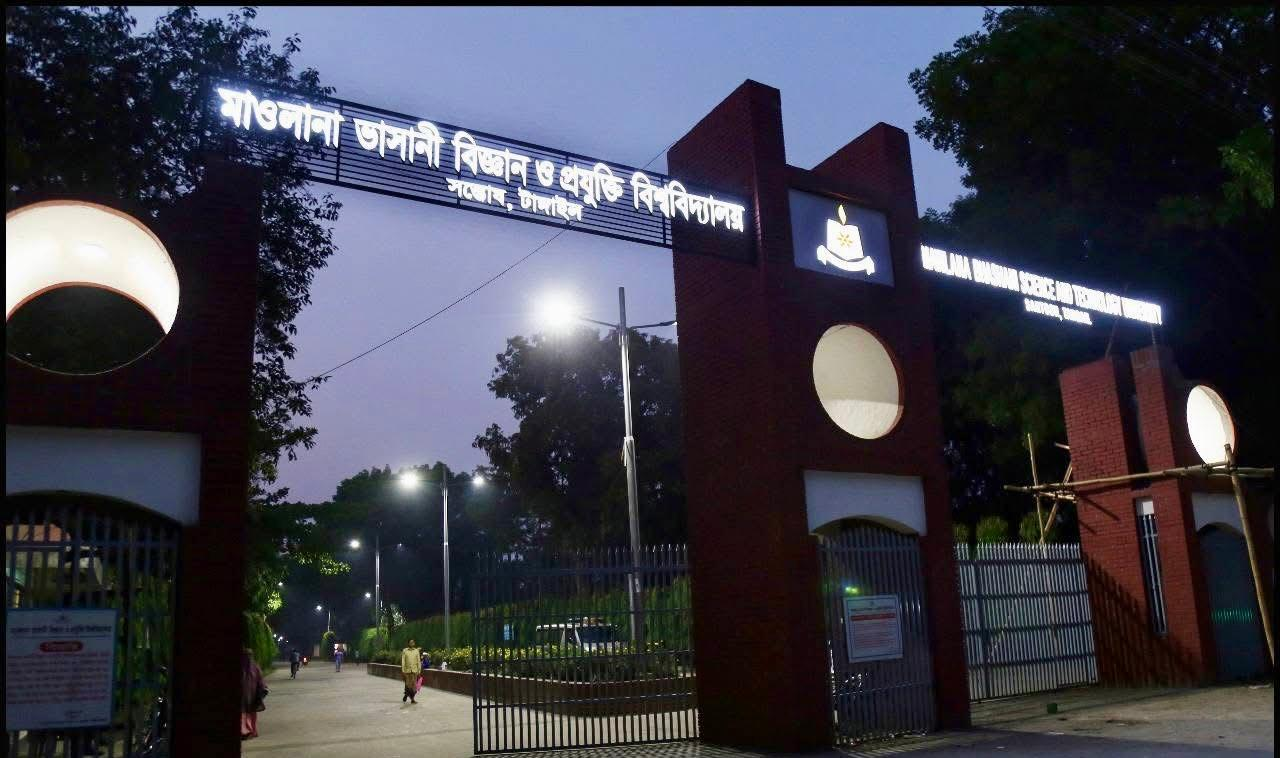

University rankings

Global – Overall
- THE World: 1201-1500 (2026)

Regional – Overall
- QS Asia: 851-900 (2026)

Mawlana Bhashani Science and Technology University (MBSTU) (Bengali: মাওলানা ভাসানী বিজ্ঞান ও প্রযুক্তি বিশ্ববিদ্যালয়) is the 12th oldest public university, and second science and technology specialized PhD granting public university, in Bangladesh. It is named after Mawlana Abdul Hamid Khan Bhashani. The medium of instruction is English. Every year, 925 students enroll in undergraduate programs at the university, delivered by around 243 teachers. In 2024, MBSTU was the 5th ranked research university in Bangladesh according to Scopus-SCImago institution ranking.

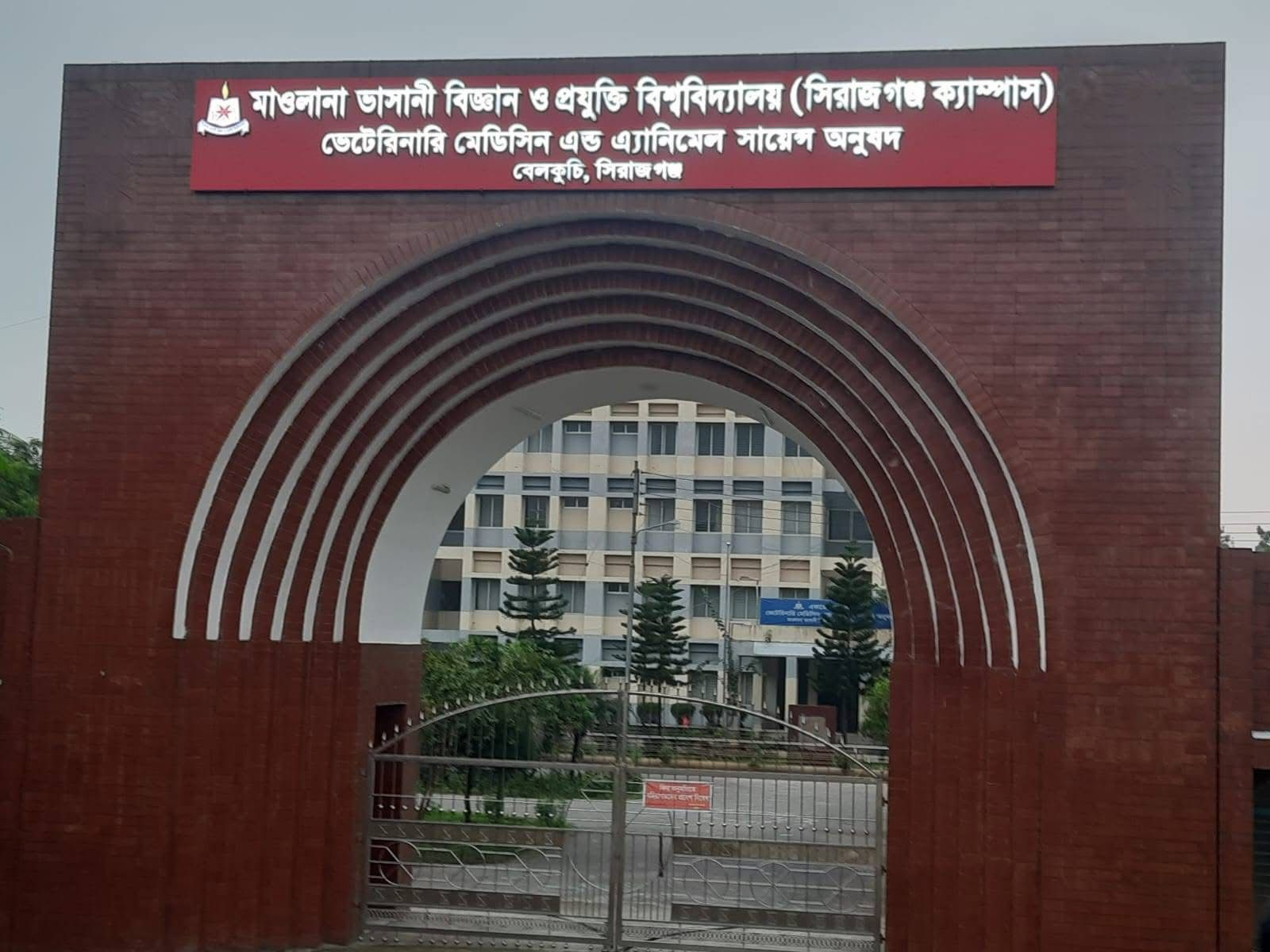
The main gate of MBSTU Sirajganj campus.

== History ==
Bhasani officially announced the establishment of the university on 8 February 1957. However, he was unable to start organising this activity until 1970. On 8 September 1970, Bhasani made his final proposal for a university in an article titled "My Plan for an Islamic University"; however, he did not implement this plan during his lifetime. In 1982, the head of state proposed the establishment of a government university following Bhasani's plan. On 15 December 1982, a 12-member committee was formed. The committee submitted their recommendation to the president on 22 May 1983. On 26 July 1984, the president formed a 9-member Board of Trustees for the Santosh Islami University (SEB) with educationist Mir Fakruzzaman as chairman and Syed Irfanul Bari as secretary. However, due to various complications, including political instability, the program did not advance further.

In 1996, the government enacted a plan to spread science and technology education to remote areas of the country. Part of this plan was to set up a science and technology university in Tangail. In 1997, the government decided to set up one science and technology center in an old district which did not have a university. The Board of Trustees of Santosh Islami University submitted a proposal to the government to establish a science and technology university in Santosh.

Government of Bangladesh laid the foundation-stone of MBSTU at Santosh, Tangail in 1999. Aminul Hoque was appointed as the founder project director on 7 January 2001. Yousuf Sharif Ahmed Khan was appointed as vice-chancellor by the government on 21 November 2002, and classes began on 25 October 2003 with 5 teachers and 83 students. Initially, the university had two departments, Computer Science and Engineering (CSE) and Information and Communication Technology (ICT). The following year two more departments were added, Criminology and Police Science (CPS), Environmental Science and Resource Management (ESRM).

In the 2003–2004 academic session, three new departments opened: Textile Engineering (TE), Biotechnology & Genetic Engineering (BGE), and Food Technology & Nutritional Science (FTNS). In the 2010–2011 academic session, four new departments were added: Business Administration, Chemistry, Mathematics and Statistics, and Physics. In 2012, Mathematics and Statistics split into two departments. The Department of Economics was established within the Faculty of Social Science in 2012–2013, and in 2013–2014 Pharmacy and Biochemistry & Molecular Biology were founded.

Between 2013 and 2015, MBSTU was the scene of violent clashes allegedly involving the Bangladesh Chhatra League (BCL). University staff were beaten, payments were extorted, buildings were vandalized, classrooms set on fire and in May 2015, a student leader named Abu Sadaat Muhammed Khaled Musharraf was murdered. This caused vice chancellor Mohammad Alauddin to temporarily close the university.

== List of vice-chancellors ==
Sequence	Vice Chancellor	From	Up to
1	Yusuf Sharif Ahmed Khan	2002-11-21	2004-09-21
2	Md. Khalilur Rahman	2004-09-22	2007-05-06
3	Md. Mominul Haque	2007-05-07	2009-05-03
4	M. Nurul Islam	2009-05-04	2013-05-03
5	Md. Alauddin	2013-05-04	2017-05-05
6	Md. Alauddin	2017-07-29	2021-07-28
7	Md. Forhad Hossain	2022-01-12	2024-08-07
8	Md. Anwarul Azim Akhand	2024-22-09	present

== Campus ==
The main campus is located in Santosh, in the southwestern part of Tangail, a city about 75 kilometres (47 mi) north-west of Dhaka. The main campus occupies about 70.69 acres (0.2861 km^{2}) and a budget of approximately 3.66 billion BDT has been approved by the government for the enlargement of the university. This area includes six faculties, the administrative building, the central library, a cafeteria, seven student halls, a medical centre and a sports field. The historic auditorium, built under the supervision of Mawlana Bhashani, a big pond named after the mystic guru, Pir (saint/wali) Shah Zamaan, the Mazaar (Shrine) of Mawlana Bhashani, a mosque, the Mawlana Bhashani museum and the Mawlana Bhashani Research Center are also located on the university's premises.

In 2023, Sirajganj Government Veterinary College became an Out Reach Campus (second campus) of MBSTU. The off-campus is the latest faculty of MBSTU, Veterinary Medicine and Animal Science. This facility is located in Belkuchi, Sirajganj. It occupies 10 acres of land, and includes a veterinary hospital, an animal shed, an auditorium and student halls.

== Academics ==
The academic departments of the university offer degree programs under five faculties: the faculty of Engineering, Faculty of Life Science, Faculty of Science, Faculty of Business Administration and Faculty of Social Science. All the departments offer undergraduate degree programs, and 20 departments offer graduate programs.

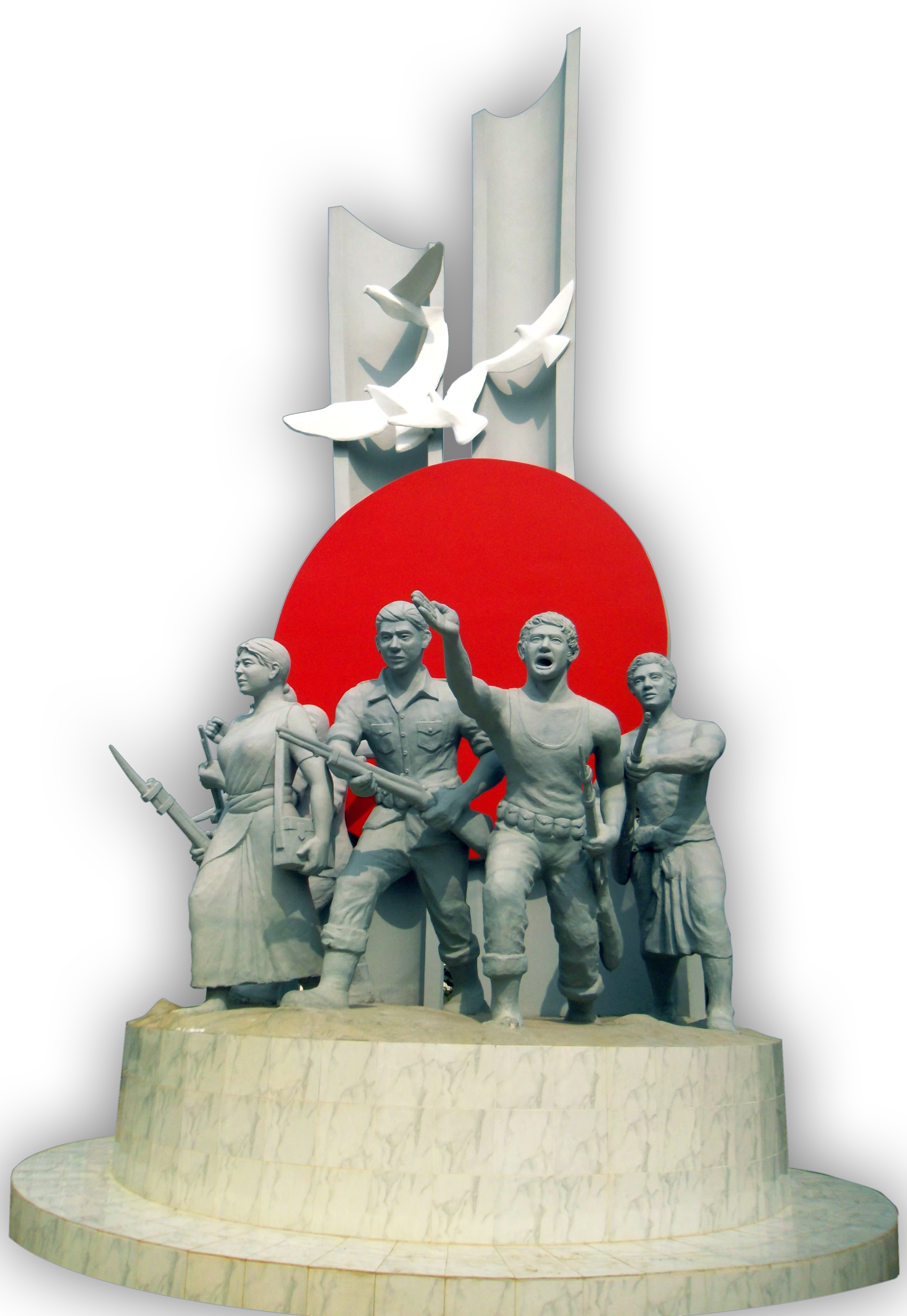
Statue located in MBSTU Campus depicts the heroes of Bangladesh Liberation War

=== Ranking and reputation ===
SCImago Institutions Rankings (2020)
Overall (World)	495
Overall (Asia)	224
Overall (Bangladesh)	1st

=== Undergraduate degree programs ===
The university has 20 Departments under 7 Faculties.

Faculty	Department
Faculty of Engineering	Computer Science and Engineering
Faculty of Engineering	Information and Communication Technology
Faculty of Engineering	Textile Engineering
Faculty of Engineering	Mechanical Engineering
Faculty of Life Science	Environmental Science and Resource Management
Faculty of Life Science	Criminology and Police Science
Faculty of Life Science	Food Technology and Nutritional Science
Faculty of Life Science	Biotechnology and Genetic Engineering
Faculty of Life Science	Biochemistry and Molecular Biology
Faculty of Life Science	Pharmacy
Faculty of Life Science	Physiotherapy and Rehabilitation
Faculty of Science	Chemistry
Faculty of Science	Mathematics
Faculty of Science	Physics
Faculty of Science	Statistics & Data science
Faculty of Business Studies	Accounting
Faculty of Business Studies	Management
Faculty of Social Science	Economics
Faculty of Arts	English
Faculty of Veterinary Medicine and Animal Sciences	Veterinary Science and Animal Husbandry

=== Graduate degree programs ===
==== Faculty of Engineering ====
- Department of Computer Science and Engineering (CSE)
- Department of Information and Communication Technology (ICT/ICE)
- Department of Textile Engineering (TE)
- Department of Mechanical Engineering (ME)

==== Faculty of Life Science ====
- Department of Environmental Science and Resource Management (ESRM)
- Department of Criminology and Police Science (CPS)
- Department of Food Technology and Nutrition Science (FTNS)
- Department of Biotechnology and Genetic Engineering (BGE)
- Department of Biochemistry and Molecular Biology (BMB)
- Department of Pharmacy (PHAR)

==== Faculty of Science ====
- Department of Chemistry (CHEM)
- Department of Mathematics (MAT)
- Department of Physics (PHY)
- Department of Statistics & Data Science (STAT)

==== Faculty of Business Studies ====
- Department of Accounting (ACCT)
- Department of Management (MGT)
- Department of Business Administration (BBA)

==== Faculty of Social Science ====
- Department of Economics (ECON)

==== Faculty of Arts ====
- Department of English (ENG)

==== Faculty of Veterinary Medicine and Animal Science ====
- Department of Veterinary Science and Animal Husbandry

=== Academic calendar ===
The academic year is divided into two semesters, each of 18.4 weeks. Classes run from 8:00 am to 5:00 pm five days a week (Saturday through Wednesday). Thursday and Friday are the weekend. A full-time undergraduate course consists of four sessions (academic years), or eight semesters. A regular examination is held at the end of each semester as a final examination. Other measures of progress include class tests, assignments, and projects.

=== Admission ===
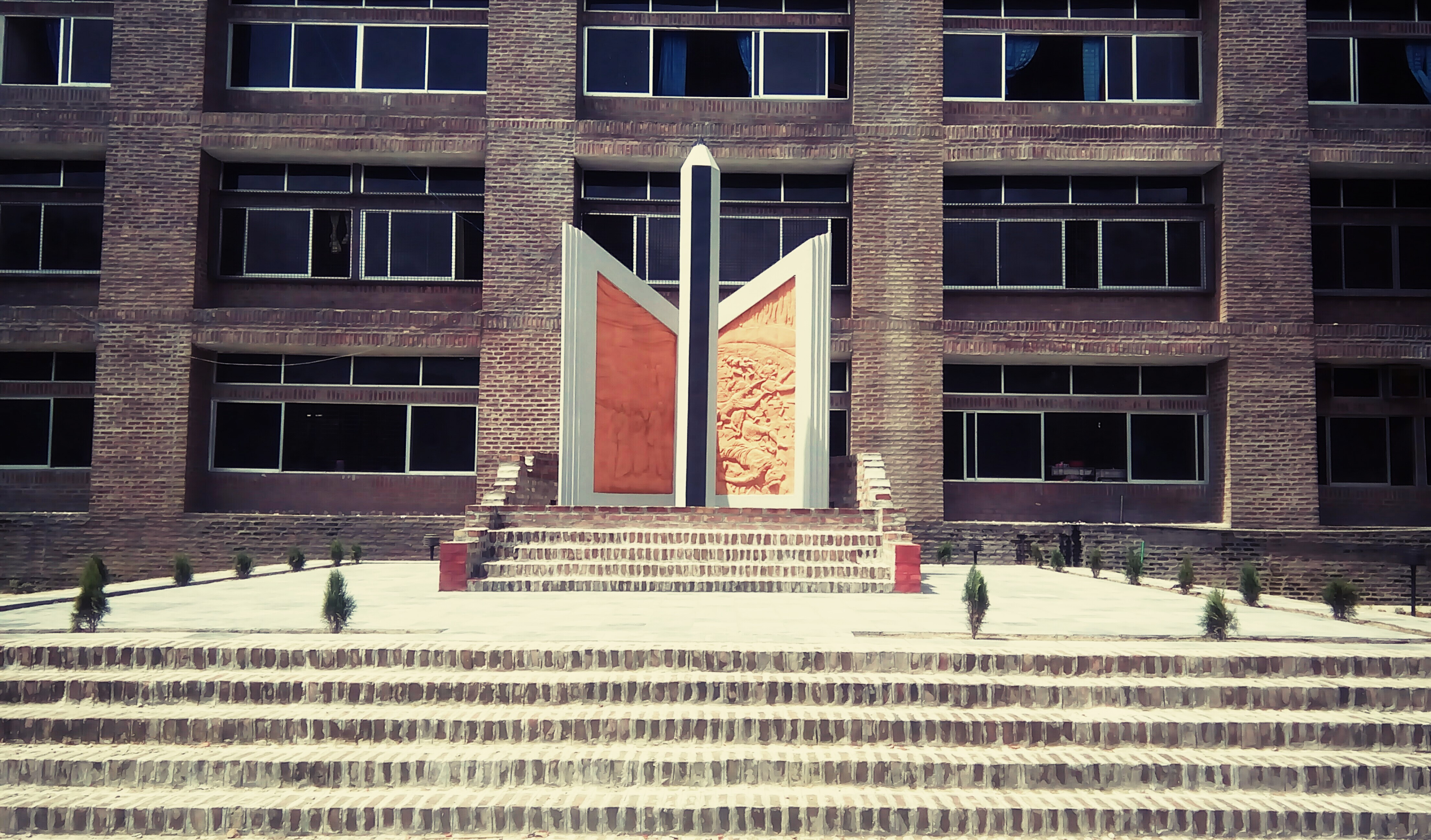
Martyred Intellectuals Memorial, MBSTU

BSc admission to MBSTU is competitive, and is determined in part through an admissions test. After completion of the higher secondary level (HSC) education, A levels (Edexcel/ Cambridge) a student can submit an application for an undergraduate admission test if they fulfil the minimum requirement. Students with a minimum grade in the subjects related to the respective departments in their higher secondary examination are allowed to appear in the admission test. There are four units in the admission test program: unit A for Engineering, unit B for Life Science, unit C for Science and unit D for Business Studies and Social Sciences. For the admission of the undergraduate programs in 2016–17 at MBSTU, 66730 candidates competed for 795 places. The most competitive unit is A, for the engineering departments. In 2016–17, approximately 23,000 students competed for 165 places in unit A.

For admission to M.S. and PGD programs, candidates are required to take admission tests.

== Campus life ==
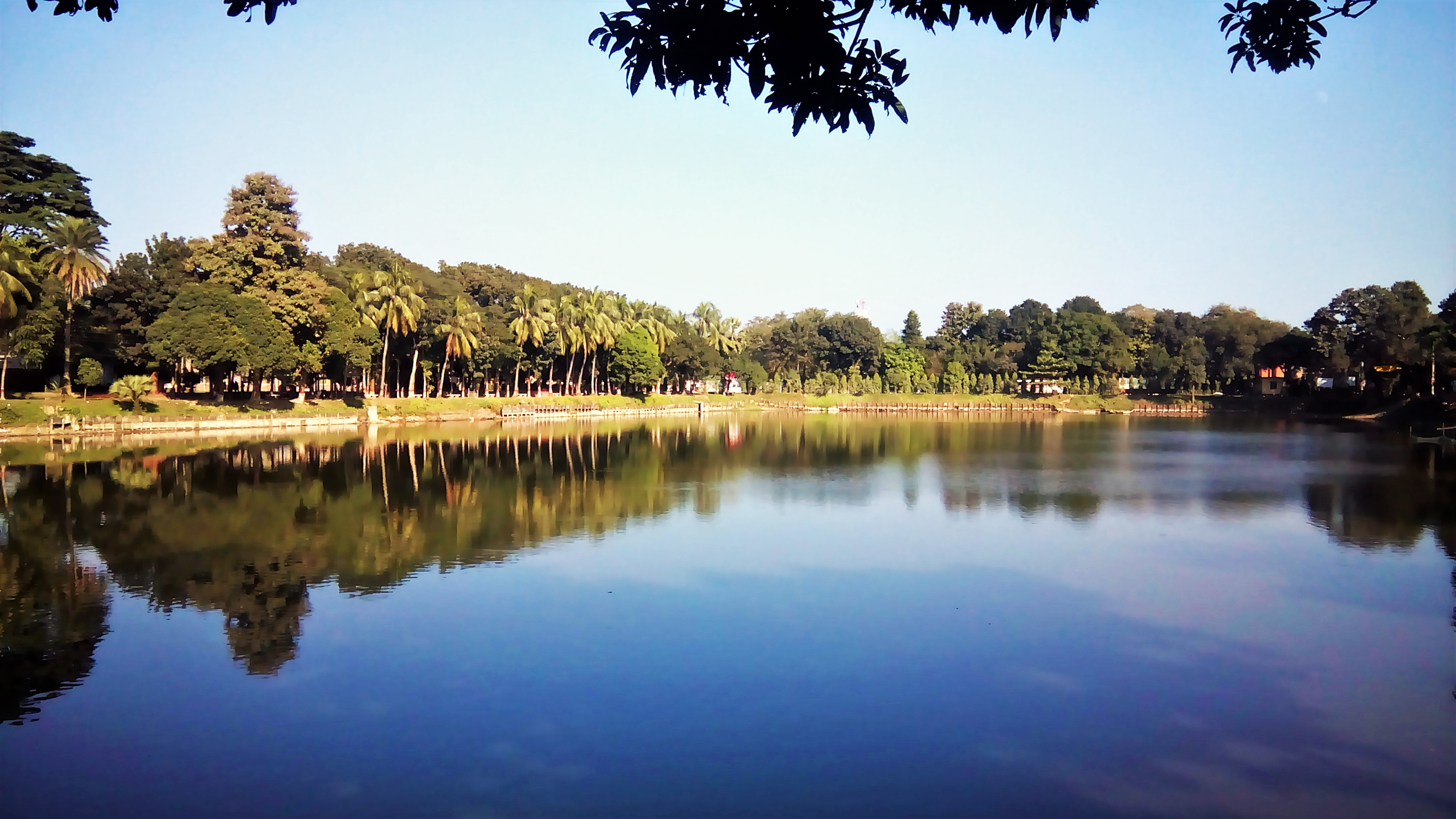
Piir Shahjaman Dighi, MBSTU

Cultural activities such as Ekushey February (International Mother Language Day), Shwadhinota Dibosh (Independence Day), Bijoy Dibosh (Victory Day), Mawlana Bhashani's birth and death anniversaries, Pohela Boishakh (the first day of the Bengali calendar) and Boshonto Boron (the first day of spring in the Bengali calendar) are celebrated annually. In addition, many other festivals such as programming contests, seminars, workshops, symposiums, debating competitions, quiz contests, a film festival and a book fair are organized throughout the year.

=== Library ===
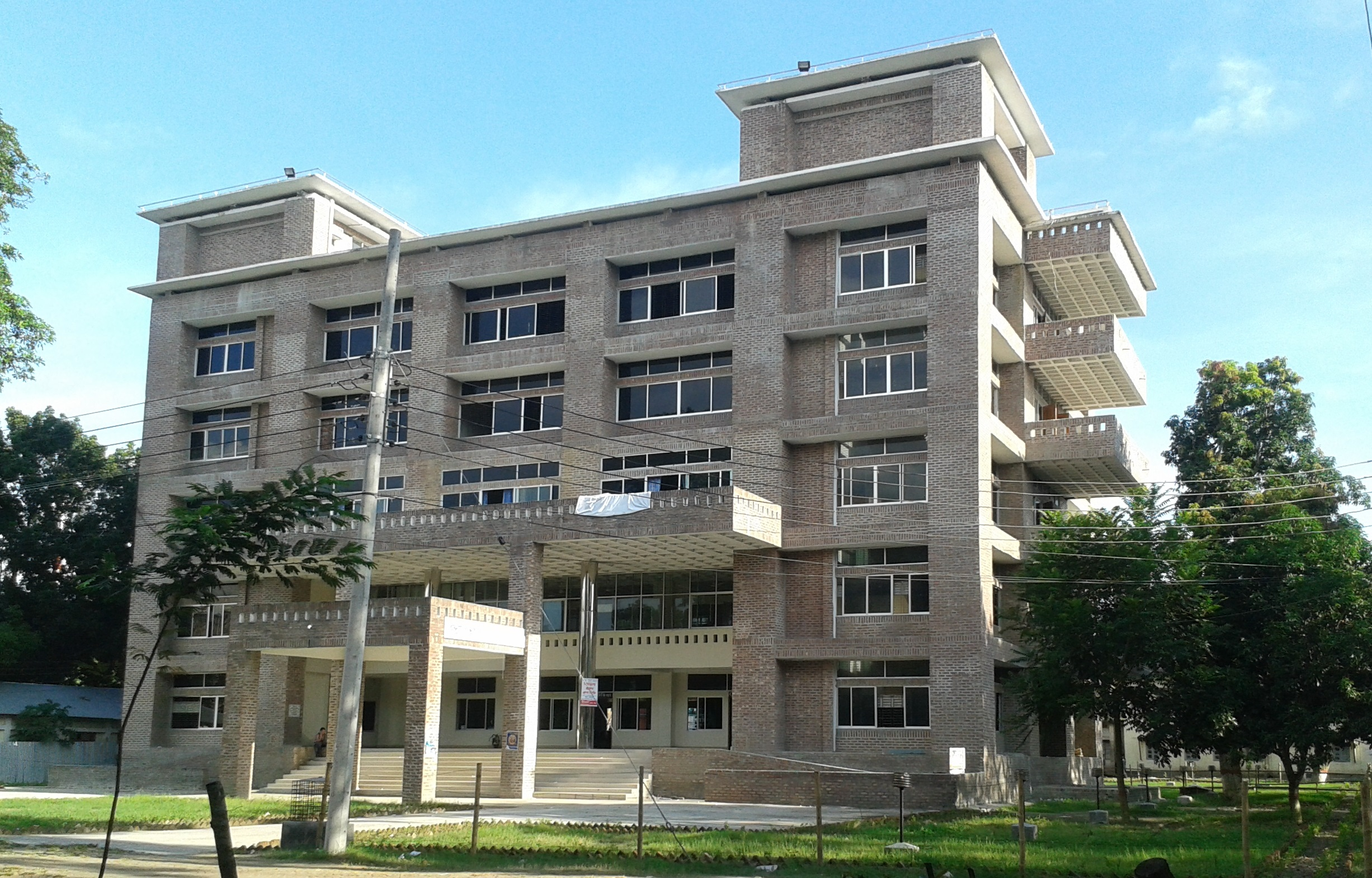
MBSTU Library and Cafeteria

The central library contains a large collection of course-related books, along with reference books and books that cover subjects beyond the courses offered by the university. The university library has been proposed to become an electronic library in keeping with the motto "Digital Bangladesh".

In addition to the Central Library, every department has its own seminar library to fulfil the demands of the students and teachers, with collections of books on topics across the academic courses of that department.

=== Halls of residence ===
There are 9 halls (7 halls on the main campus and 2 halls on the Sirajganj campus) to provide residential accommodation and non-residential attachments for MBSTU students. A provost/superintendent and an assistant provost are appointed for every hall administration. The halls are listed below:

==== Male halls ====
- Jananeta Abdul Mannan Hall (also known as JAMH )
- Bangabandhu Sheikh Mujibur Rahman Hall (also known as BSMRH )
- Shahid Ziaur Rahman Hall (also known as SZRH )
- Zahir Raihan Hall (Proposed, previous name was Sheikh Rasel Hall)
- Shaheed M. Monsur Ali Hall (Sirajganj campus)

==== Female halls ====
- Alema Khatun Bhashani Hall (also known as AKBH )
- Shaheed Janani Jahanara Imam Hall (former residence of the Zamindar of Santosh during the British Raj, now MBSTU property)
- Bangamata Sheikh Fazilatunnesa Mujib Hall
- Bangamata Sheikh Fazilatunnesa Mujib Hall (Sirajganj campus)

Several other academic halls are under construction.

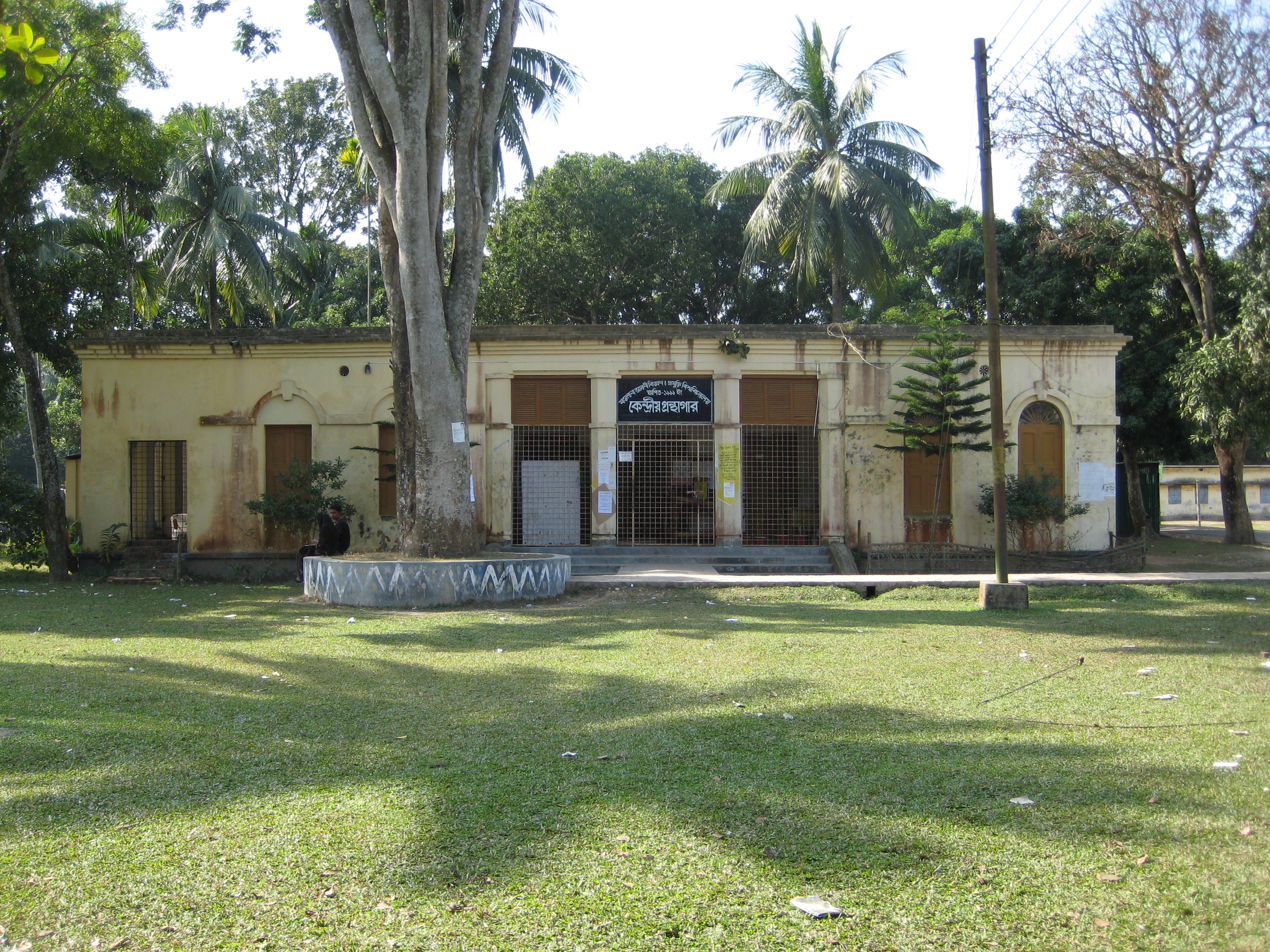
Medical Center, MBSTU

=== Health services ===
The medical centre of MBSTU offers free medical services and medicines to students, teachers and staff of the university, as well as family members of teachers and staff. It also has its own ambulance service.

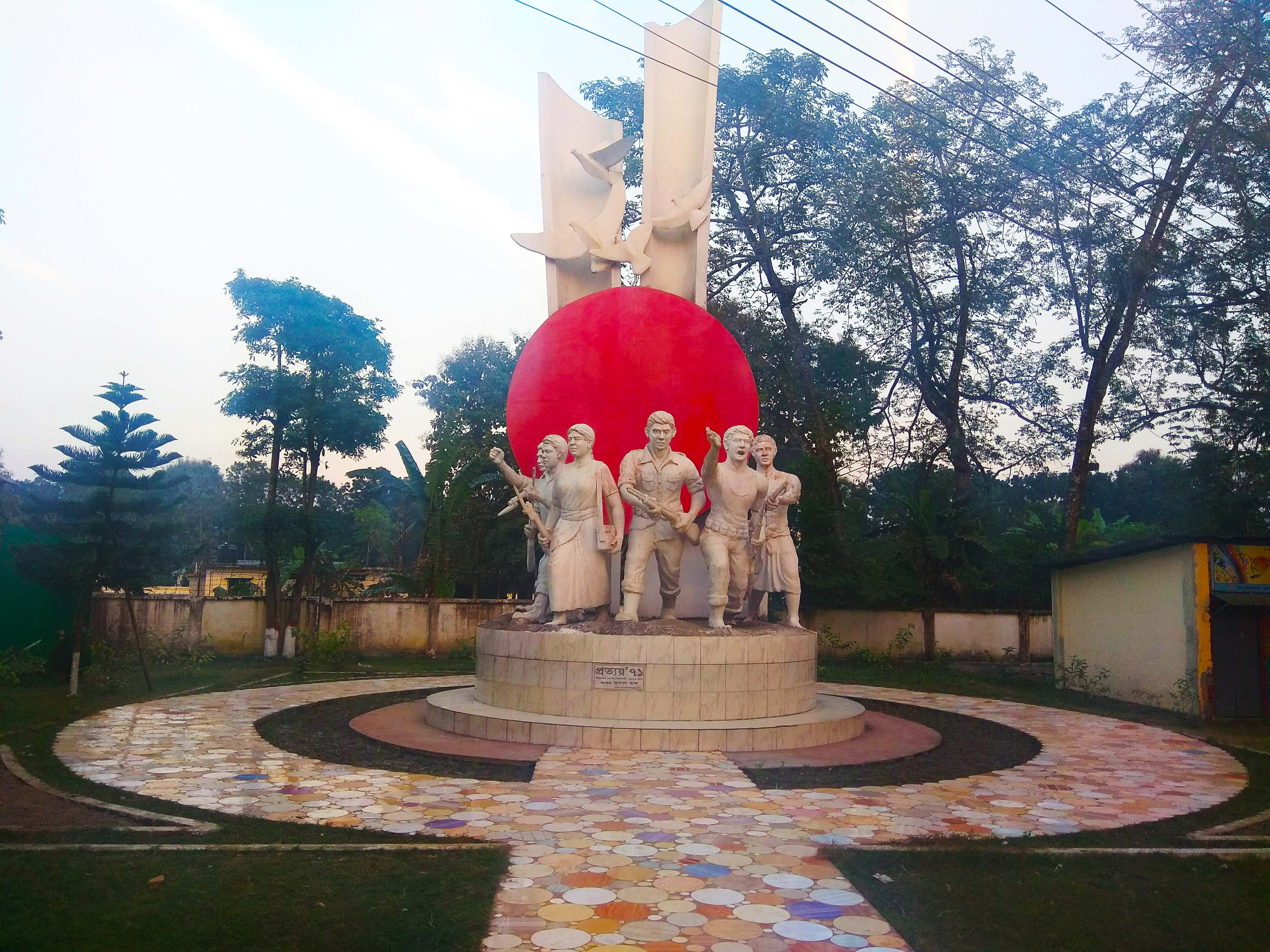
A sculpture commemorating the Liberation War on the premises of Maolana Bhasani Science and Technology University at Santosh in Tangail, Bangladesh

== Gallery ==
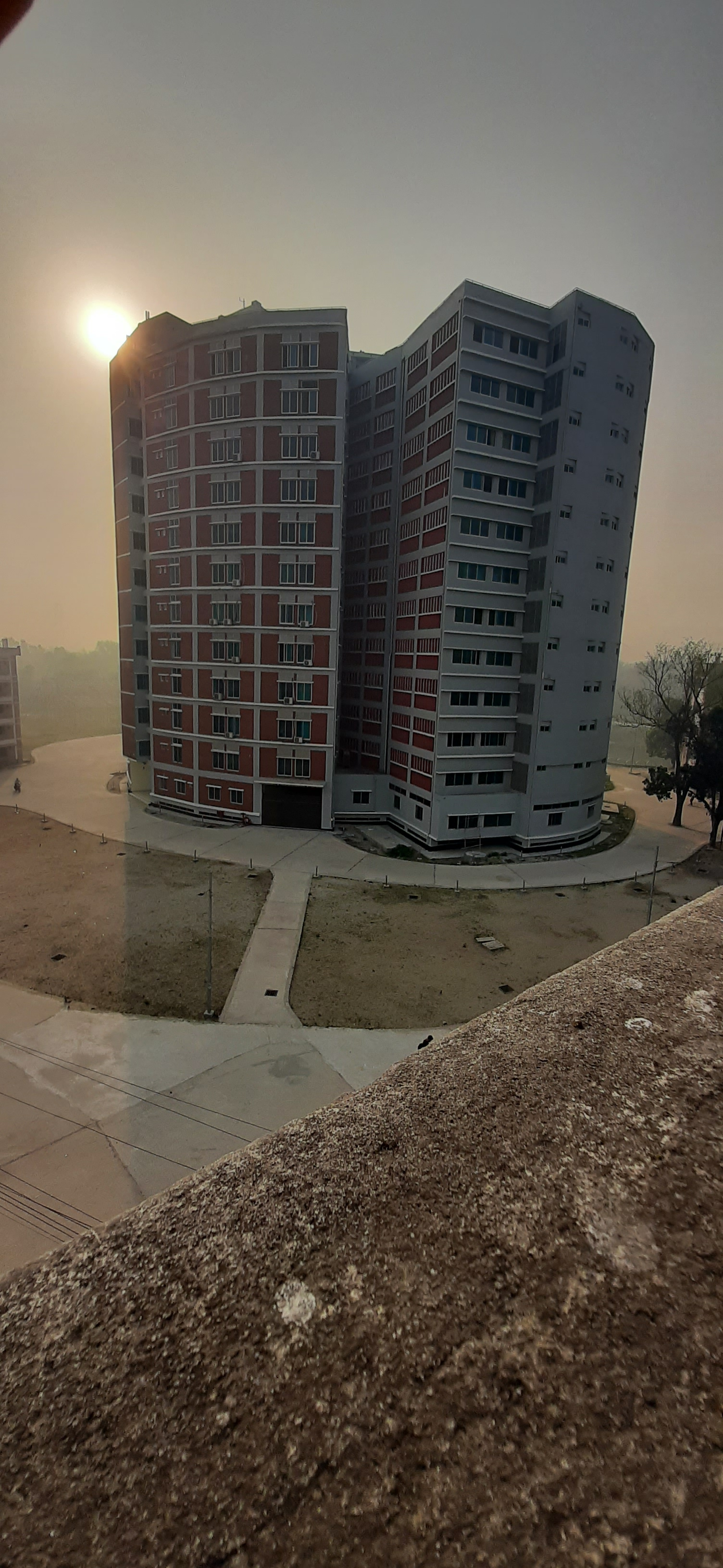
Academic building

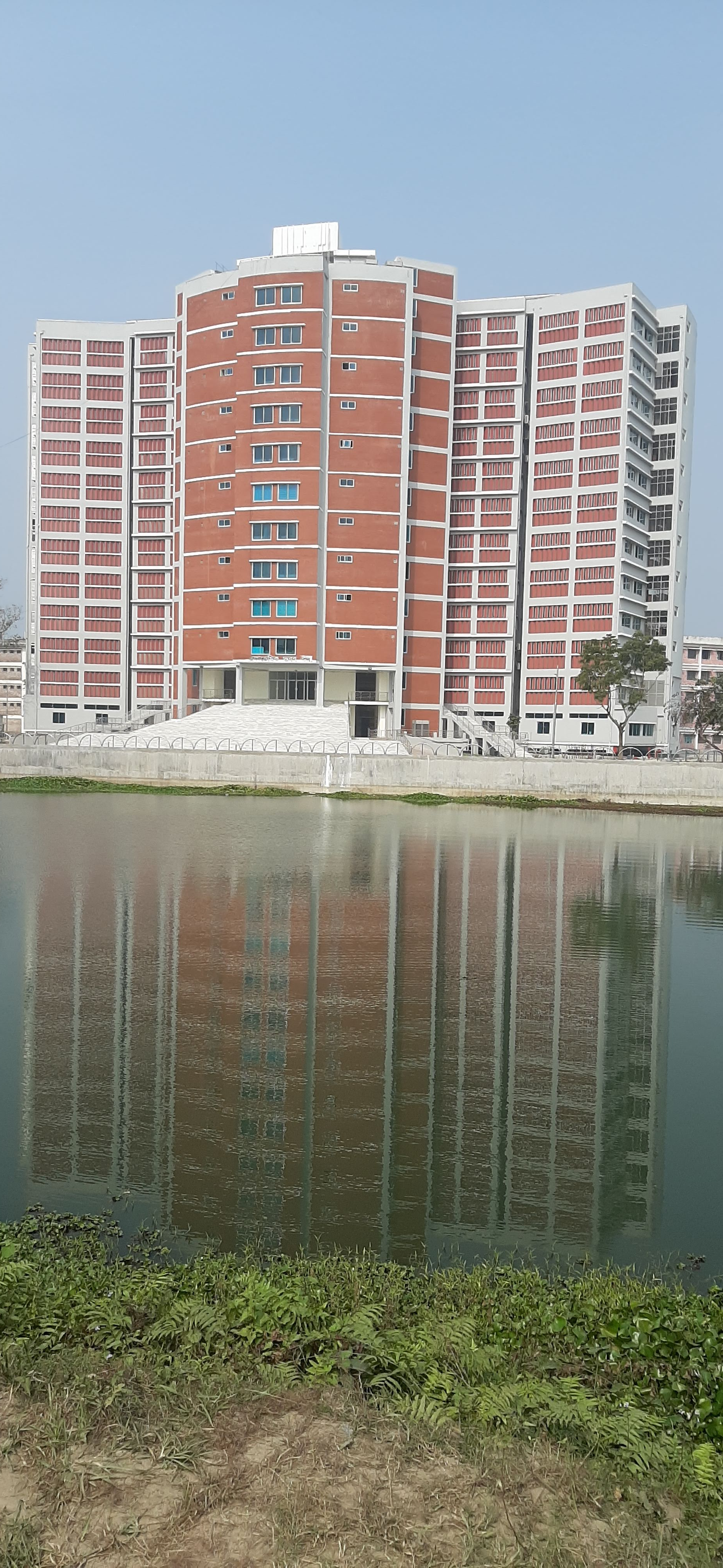
Academic building

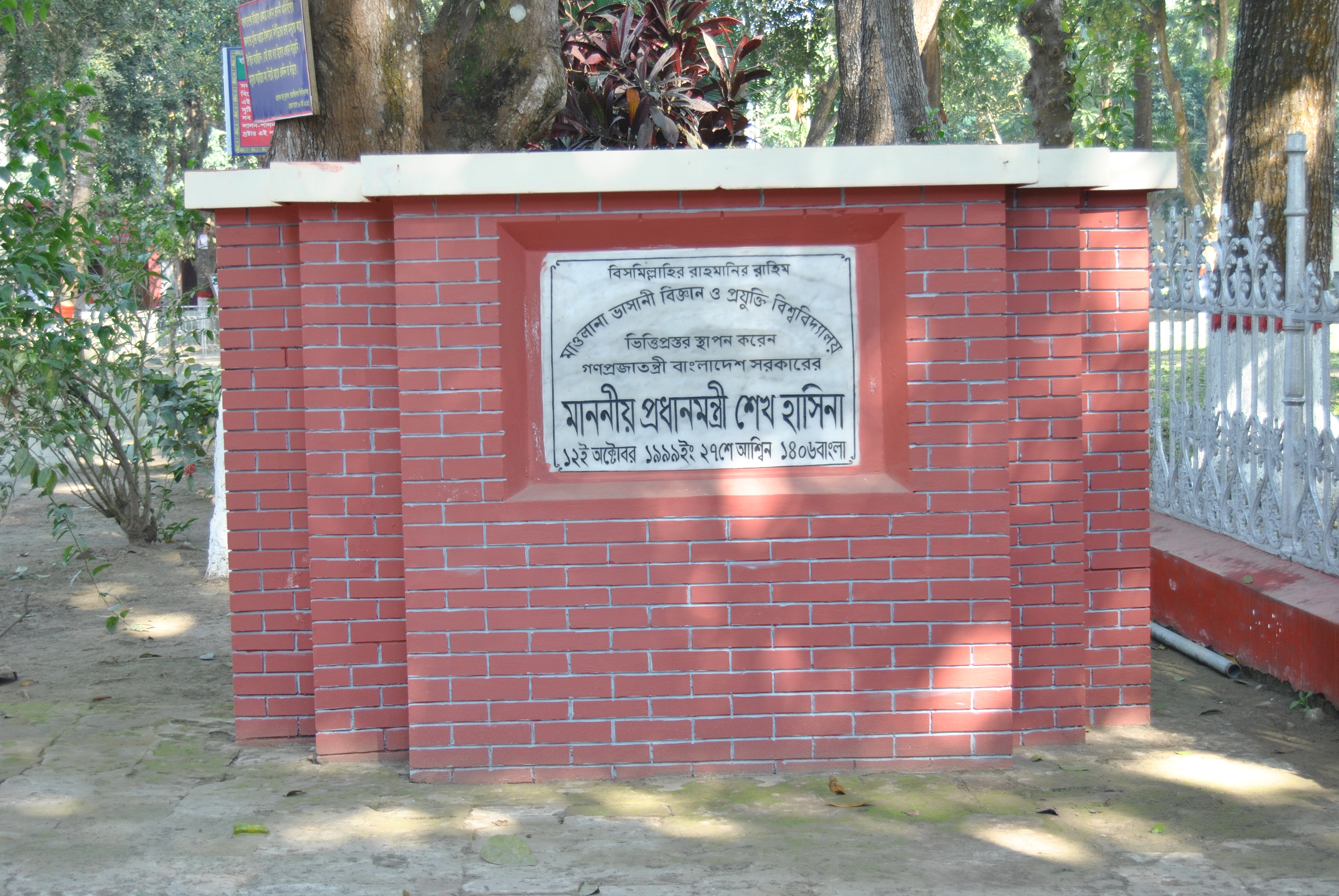
Foundation stone monument

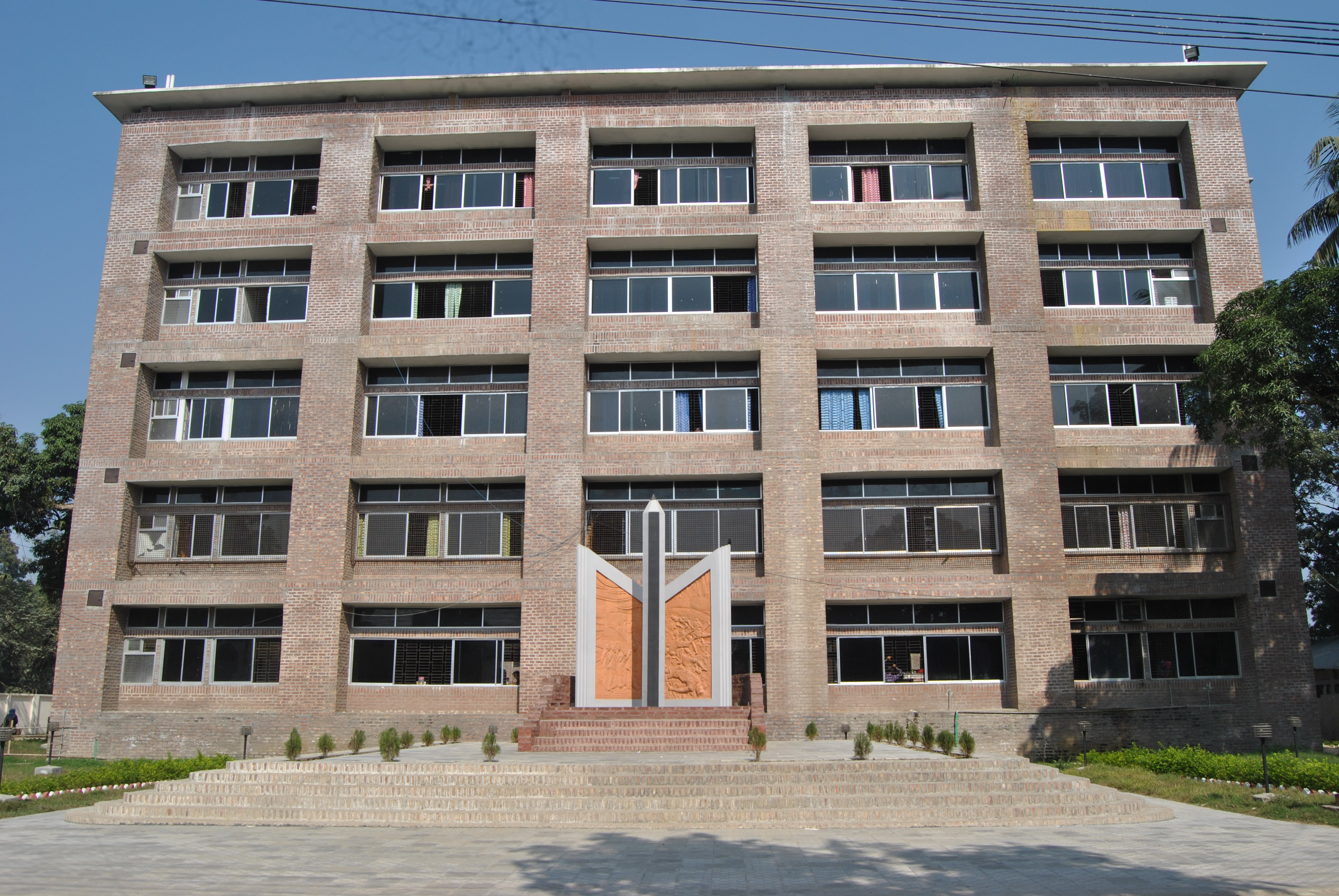
Intellectual Mancha

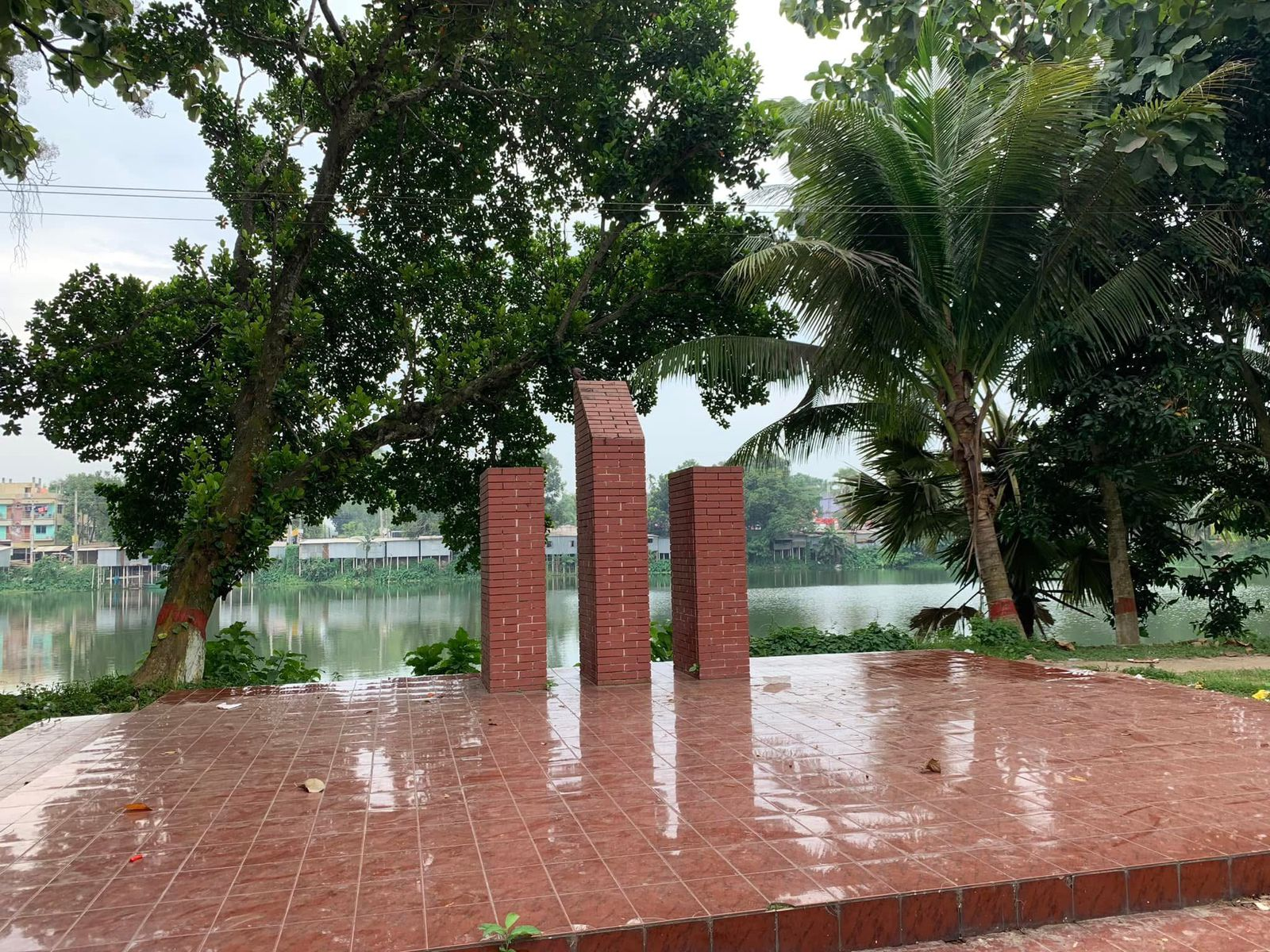
Martyrs Monument of MBSTU

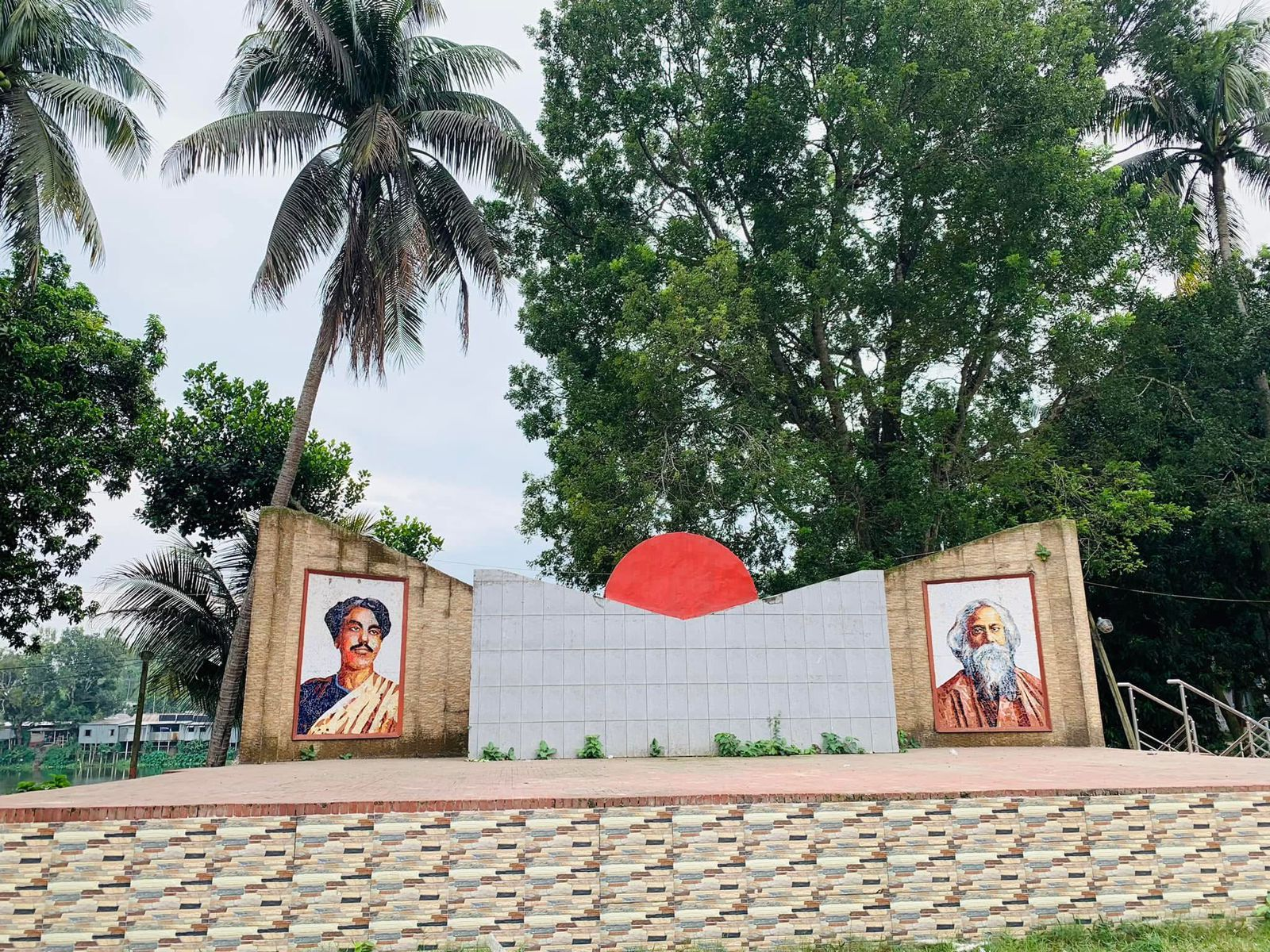
Mukta Mancha of MBSTU

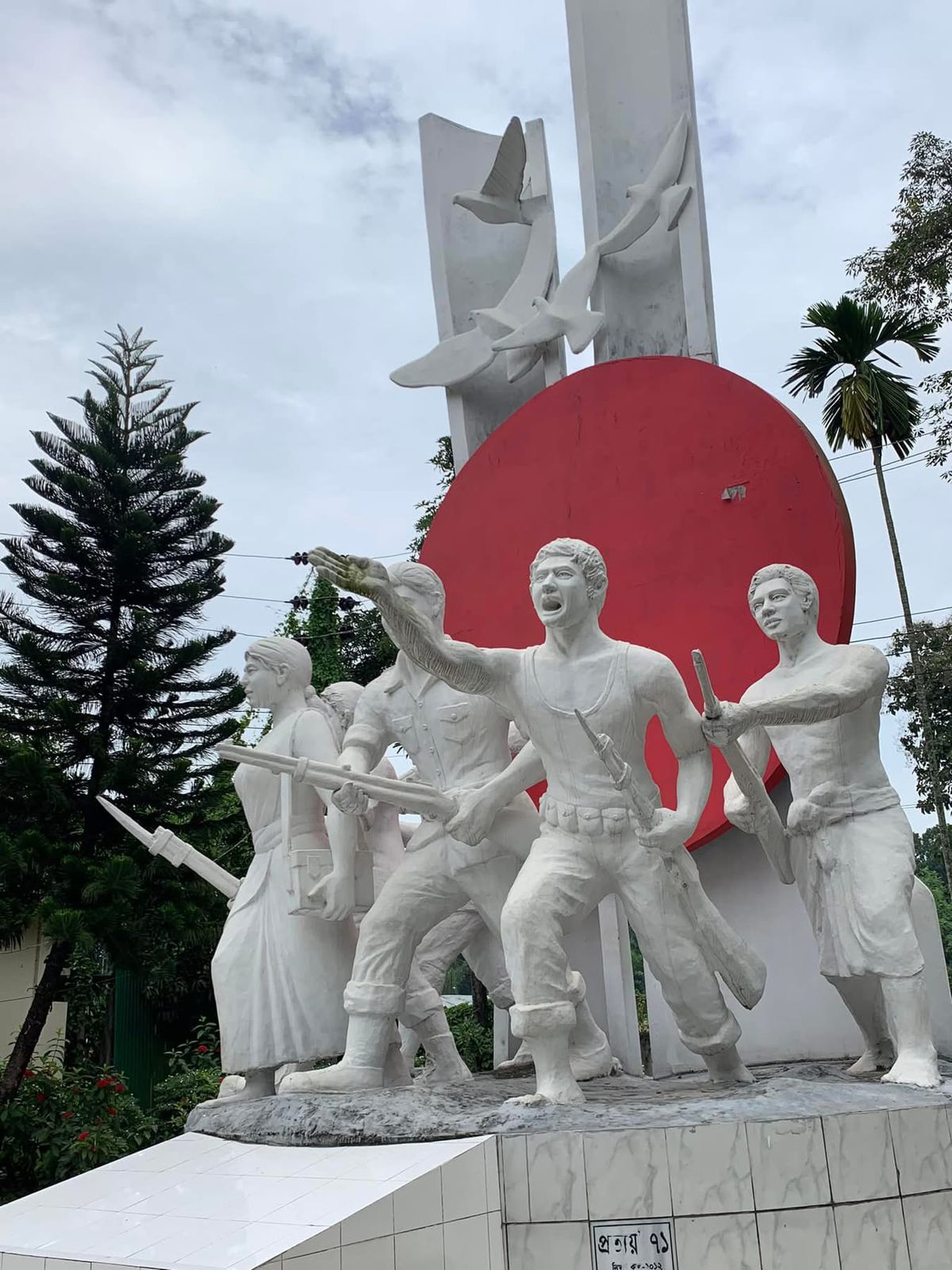
Prottoy-71(MBSTU)

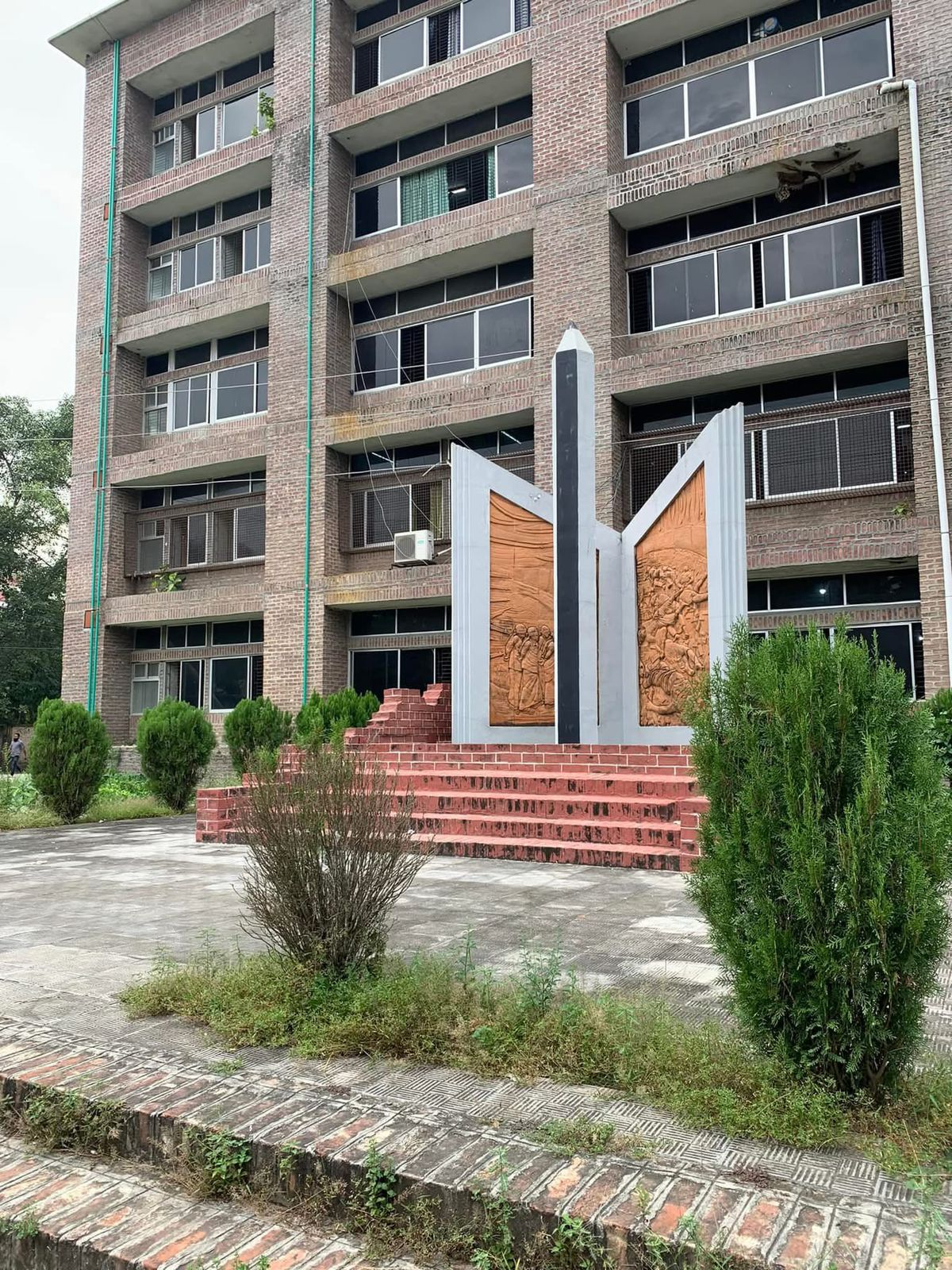
Intellectual Mancha of MBSTU

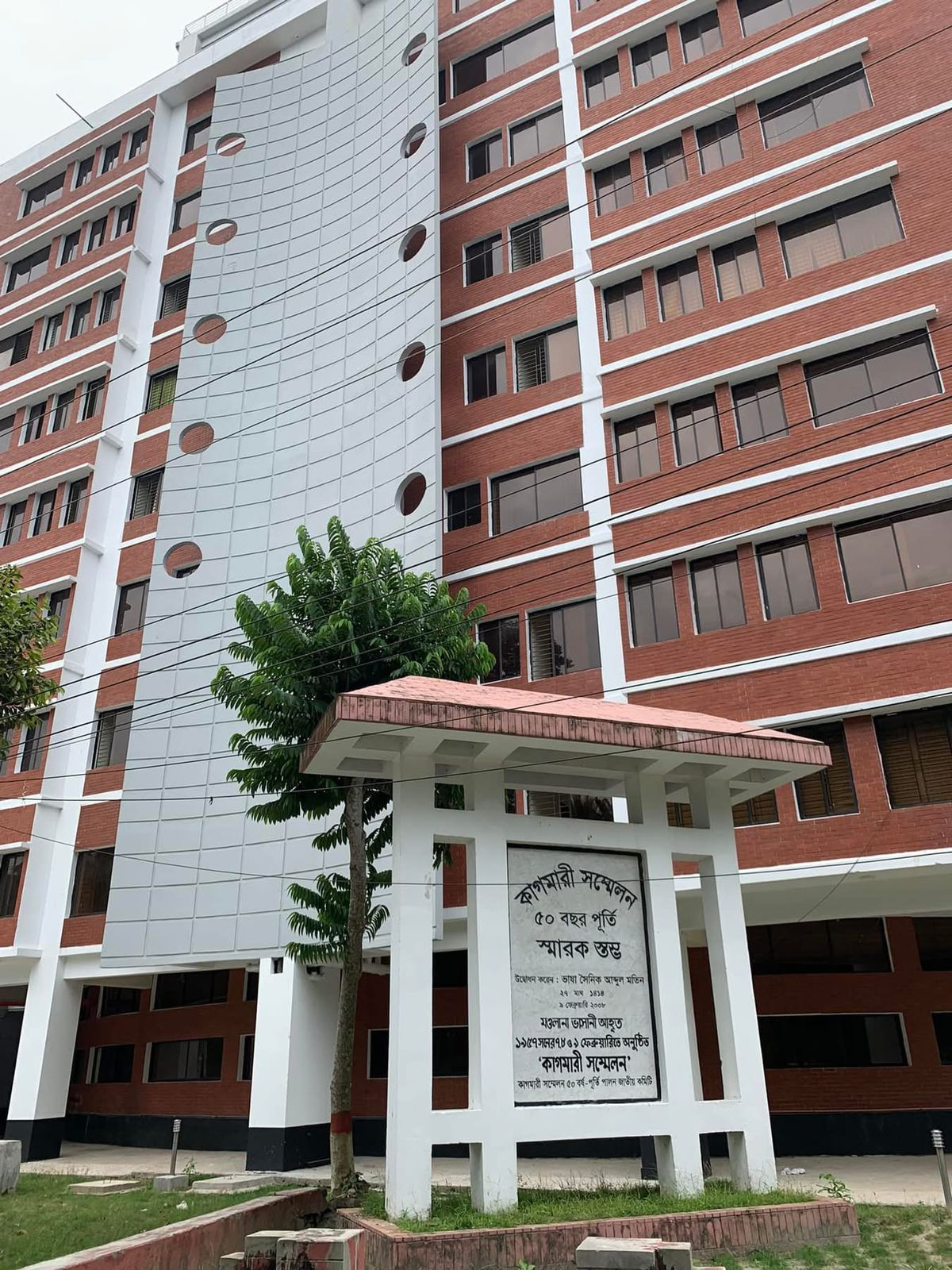
Kagmari Conference Memorial Pillar(MBSTU)

== See also ==
- Military Institute of Science and Technology (MIST)
- Hajee Mohammad Danesh Science and Technology University (HSTU)
- Berabuchina
