= U. N. Siddiqui =

U. N. Siddiqui was a Bangladeshi lawyer and the second vice-chancellor of the University of Chittagong.

== Early life ==
Siddique was born Ubaidun Nur Siddiqui in 1903 in Chittagong, Bengal Presidency, British India. He finished his Bachelor of Arts at the University of Dhaka in 1924. He completed his Bachelor of Laws at the University of Calcutta in 1929. He spoke Bengali, English, Persian, and Urdu.

== Career ==
Siddiqui started working as a lawyer in the Calcutta Small Causes Court and the Chief Presidency Magistrate Court. From 1944 to 1945, he served as the police magistrate of Howrah District. After the partition of India, he moved to East Pakistan and started working in Chittagong. He mediated a labour dispute between the Chittagong Port Commissioners and the Chittagong Port Commissioners Employees Union in the Labour Tribunal.

Siddiqui was a founding director of the Chittagong Co-operative Housing Society Limited. He was a member of the working committee of the Chittagong City unit of the Muslim League. He was the vice-president of the Chittagong Muslim Education Society. He was a member of the Chittagong District Bar Association and the executive committee of the Anjuman-i-Himayat-i-Islam. He was the president of the Quid-e-Azam Urdu Library in Chittagong. In 1957, he was the principal of the Chittagong Law College.

Siddiqui was a founding member of the Rotary Club of Chittagong and a member of the Chittagong Club and Chittagong Rifle Club. As a Rotarian, he donated an ambulance to the fleet of the Medical College Hospital. He served as the President of the Rotary Club of Chittagong. He was a member of the Chittagong District Board of Soldiers, Sailors, and Airmen's Board. He was the President of the Banshkhali Unnayan Samiti. He was a legal advisor to the Chittagong Port and the East Bengal Railways.

From 21 April 1971 to 30 January 1972, Siddiqui served as the vice-chancellor of the University of Chittagong. He was also the dean of the Law School at the University. During the Bangladesh Liberation War, he denied rumours that the University of Chittagong was destroyed by the Pakistan Military and supported the position of the Pakistan government. He lived in Hazari Lane, Chittagong. He had purchased the home of Sucharu Babu and constructed a mansion on the grounds.
