= M. A. Aziz Khan =

M. Abdul Aziz Khan
- Born: February 1931; Pabna, Bengal Presidency, British India
- Died: March 28, 2012 (aged 81); Bangladesh
- Education: University of Dhaka, University of Cambridge
- Known for: Botanical research, Academic leadership, Plantation Club Bangladesh
- Awards: Fellow of Bangladesh Academy of Sciences (1992)
- Scientific career
- Fields: Botany, Plant Physiology, Horticulture
- Workplaces: University of Dhaka, University of Chittagong

Professor Muhammad Abdul Aziz Khan (February 1931 – 28 March 2012) was a Bangladeshi botanist, academic, and former Vice-Chancellor of the University of Chittagong.

== Early life and education ==
Khan was born on 1 February 1931 in Pabna, Bengal Presidency, British India. He completed his M.Sc. in Botany from the University of Dhaka in 1952. He finished his Ph.D. from the University of Cambridge in 1964 under the Colombo Plan Scholarship. Between 1961 and 1964, he undertook advanced coursework in plant physiology at Cambridge.

== Career ==
Khan began his academic career as a research assistant at the University of Dhaka in 1953. He served as a senior lecturer from 1955 to 1964 and was later worked as an associate professor from 1972 to 1974. In 1974, he joined the newly established University of Chittagong as the founding chairman of the Department of Botany, a position he held until 1981.

Khan played a pioneering role in the development of the university’s botanical garden, spread across 300 acres of hilly terrain, and served as the Dean of the Faculty of Science from 1980 to 1981. From 1981 to 1985, he served as Vice-Chancellor of the University of Chittagong. During this time, he participated in international conferences of Vice-Chancellors under the Association of Commonwealth Universities (ACU) in the UK and the West Indies. He served as Chairman of the Bangladesh Association of Universities.

Khan published 41 scientific papers. He also authored textbooks and other works on education and agriculture in developing countries.

In 1996, Khan founded an environmental NGO, the Plantation Club Bangladesh, aimed at promoting homestead plantations and environmental education among rural youth and educators. Plantation Club Bangladesh received grants from the Embassy of Japan in 1999 and from CIDA in 2002 to conduct tree plantation and biodiversity programs in the districts of Pabna and Sirajganj.

Khan was elected a Fellow of the Bangladesh Academy of Sciences in 1992. He served as President of the Bangladesh Botanical Society from 1991 to 1992, and was the founding president of the Bangladesh Biggani Samiti, serving from 1993 to 1997. He was also a life member of the Bangladesh Botanical Society and the Bangladesh Association for the Advancement of Science.

== Death ==
Khan died on 28 March 2012 in BIRDEM Hospital, Dhaka, Bangladesh.
