= Md. Forhad Hossain =

- ফরহাদ হোসেন

Vice-chancellor of Mawlana Bhashani Science and Technology University
- In office 12 January 2022 – 7 August 2024
- Preceded by: Md. Alauddin
- Succeeded by: Anwarul Azim Akhand

Personal details
- Education: University of Dhaka

Md. Forhad Hossain is a Bangladeshi academic and a former vice-chancellor of Mawlana Bhashani Science and Technology University who served during 2022–2024. He was a professor of the Department of Statistics of Jahangirnagar University.

== Early life ==
Hossain graduated from Panchar High School and Government Rajendra College in 1973 and 1975 respectively. He earned his bachelor's and master's in statistics from the University of Dhaka in 1980 and 1982 respectively.

== Career ==
Hossain joined the University of Dhaka as a lecturer at the Institute of Nutrition and Food Science on 11 April 1983. From 1984 to 1988, he worked at the Bangladesh Atomic Energy Commission. On 18 August 1988, he joined the Department of Statistics at Jahangirnagar University as an assistant professor.

On 12 August 1995, Hossain was promoted to associate professor. He was promoted to full professor on 18 August 1998.

From August 2001 to May 2002, Hossain was a visiting faculty at the Ball State University. From September 2004 to June 2007, Hossain worked as a visiting faculty at King Khalid University. In November 2017, Hossain joined the University Grants Commission.

Hossain was the pro-vice chancellor of Jahangirnagar University from 24 February 2009 to 23 February 2013. He was responsible for the administrative branch. He served with Dr. Moniruzzaman, who was the pro-vice chancellor responsible for academic branch. They served under vice-chancellor Shariff Enamul Kabir.

Hossain was appointed the vice-chancellor of the Mawlana Bhashani Science and Technology University in January 2022. He was confined to his office by some staff of the university who had laid siege to his office with 12 demands. He was freed by students who offered Friday namaz with him.

In May 2023, Hossain was accused of appointing four faculty members in two vacant positions violating rules.
