= Shireen Akhter =

Bangladeshi academic (born 1956)

- শিরীণ আখতার
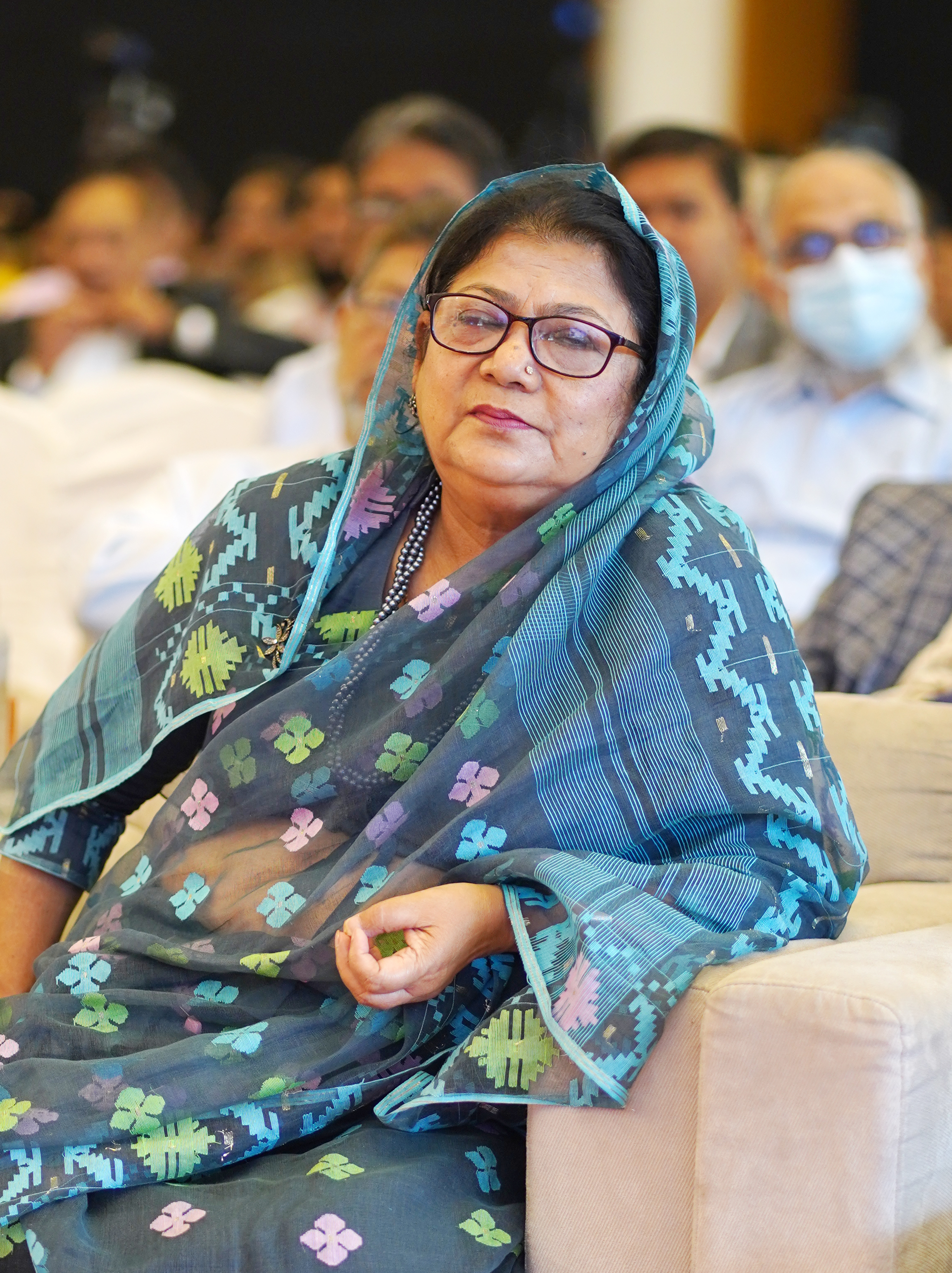
- Shireen Akhter in 2022

18th Vice Chancellor of the University of Chittagong
- In office 3 November 2019 – 19 March 2024
- Chancellor: President of Bangladesh
- Preceded by: Iftekhar Uddin Chowdhury
- Succeeded by: Md. Abu Taher

Personal details
- Born: 1 May 1956 (age 70) Cox's Bazar, East Pakistan, Pakistan
- Spouse: Latiful Alam Chowdhury (died 2020)
- Education: University of Chittagong; Jadavpur University
- Occupation: Academic

Shireen Akhter (born 1 May 1956) is a Bangladeshi academic. She was the first female vice chancellor of the University of Chittagong.

== Background and education ==
Akhter was born on 1 May 1956 to a Bengali family of Muslim Chowdhuries in Eidgaon, Cox's Bazar subdivision, Chittagong District, East Pakistan. Her father was Afsar Kamal Chowdhury and mother was Begum Lutfunnahar Kamal.

Akhter completed her SSC and HSC in 1973 and 1975 respectively. She earned her bachelor's and master's from the University of Chittagong in 1978 and 1981 respectively. In 1991, she earned her PhD from Jadavpur University, Kolkata, India.

== Career ==
Akhter was a member of Election Commission (EC) Search committee. She joined the University of Chittagong as a lecturer of Bangla department in 1996.

In 2006, Akhter was promoted to professor.

Akhter was appointed the first female vice chancellor of the University of Chittagong on 3 November 2019. She replaced Dr Iftekhar Uddin Chowdhury. In November 2020, she was nominated for the Begum Rokeya Padak and received it in December from Prime Minister Sheikh Hasina.

On 29 April 2021, Akhter was reappointed Vice-Chancellor of the University of Chittagong.

Akhter's office was vandalized in January 2023 by Bangladesh Chhatra League activists led by its University of Chittagong unit President Moynul Hasan for not recruiting Raihan Ahmed, a Bangladesh Chhatra League activist, as a faculty.

== Personal life ==
Akhter was married to Major (Retired) Latiful Alam Chowdhury. He died on 29 July 2020. They had two children.

== Works ==
- Bangladesher Tinjon Oupanyasik Showkat : Osman, Waliullah, Abu Ishaq. (1991)
