= Iftekhar Uddin Chowdhury =

Bangladeshi academic

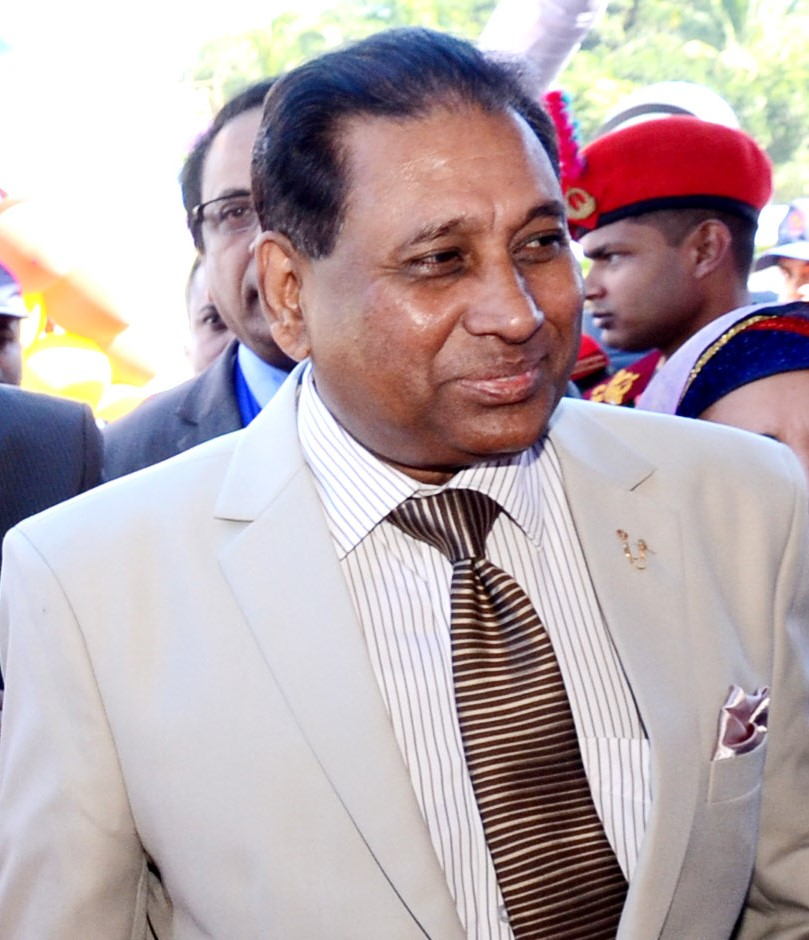
- Chowdhury in 2015

Vice-Chancellor of the University of Chittagong
- In office 2 June 2015 – 15 June 2019
- Preceded by: Anwarul Azim Arif
- Succeeded by: Shireen Akhter

Personal details
- Born: July 1, 1955 (age 71)
- Education: University of Chittagong; University of Tsukuba
- Occupation: University administrator, professor

Iftekhar Uddin Chowdhury (born 1 July 1955) is a Bangladeshi academic. He served as the 17th vice-chancellor of the University of Chittagong.

== Education and career ==
Chowdhury earned his bachelor's and master's from the University of Chittagong. He completed his Ph.D. from the University of Tsukuba in 1988.

Chowdhury is a professor of sociology at the University of Chittagong. He joined the university in 1982. He served as the pro-vice-chancellor of the university during 2013–15. He served as a visiting professor of the University of Tsukuba, Osaka University and University of Glasgow.

== Books ==
- Chowdhury, Iftekhar Uddin, ed. (1992). [Current Social Thoughts: Bangladesh Perspective] (in Bengali). Center for Social Research.
- —— (2009). Caste based discrimination in South Asia: A study of Bangladesh. Center for Social Research. ISBN 978-984-644-001-0.
- ——; Sato, Akio; Sakamoto, Shinji; Hatogai, Koichi, eds. (2010). Virejji fon: Guramin ginkō ni yoru maikuro fainansu jigyō to tojōkoku kaihatsu (in Japanese). Tokyo: Ochanomizushobō. ISBN 978-4-275-00886-2.
- ——; Sato, Akio, eds. (2012). Women Empowerment and Village Phone Through Micro Finance: An Innovative Initiative of Grameen Bank. Bangladesh: Nibedan Press. ISBN 978-984-644-002-7.
- —— (2017). Dalita o jāti-barṇa baishamya: pariprekshita Bāṃlādeśa দলিত ও জাতি-বর্ণ বৈষম্য: পরিপ্রেক্ষিত বাংলাদেশ (in Bengali). Dhaka. ISBN 978-984-526-047-3.
