= Santosh Zamindari =

- Current region: Tangail Sadar Upazila, Tangail District, Dhaka Division, Bangladesh
- Founded: 18th century
- Founder: Biswanath Choudhury

Santosh Zamindari (সন্তোসের জমিদারি ) was a zamindari based in the present day Tangail District of Bangladesh.

== History ==
The Kagmari pargana was acquired by a pir, Sahajman, during the reign of the Mughal Emperor Shah Jahan (1592–1666). Subsequently, the property passed into the hands of Biswanath Choudhury who established the Santosh zamindari. After his death, the property was divided by his three sons. While the shares of the eldest and the youngest remained with the Choudhury (later Roy Choudhury) families, the property of the second son, Rameswar Roy, passed into the hands of his daughter Shibani Dasya as Rameswar Roy did not have a son, and came to be known as the Zamindars of Aloa. The other two families came to be known as the Zamindars of Santosh. Tangail municipality was formed in 1887 and Santosh became a part of it, but it is not clear as to when Santosh became a part of it.

== The family ==
Biswanath Choudhuri's son, Maharja Manmatha Nath Roy Chowdhury (1883–1939), made it famous with his philanthropic and other activities. This family was education oriented and had three famous lady educators – Jahnavi Choudhurani, Dinamani Choudhurani and Bindubasini Choudhurani. They contributed to the development of educational institutiona in the area. The last zamindar, Golok Nath Roy Choudhury, migrated to India with his family after abolition of the zamindari system.

== Santosh Trophy ==
The Santosh Trophy, primarily the inter-state football tournament in India was generally considered the top domestic tournament in India was started in 1941 by the Indian Football Association (IFA) and was named after the former president of the IFA, Sir Manmatha Nath Roy Chowdhury, the Maharaja of Santosh.West Bengal lifted the Santosf Tropy for a record 33rd time in 2025.

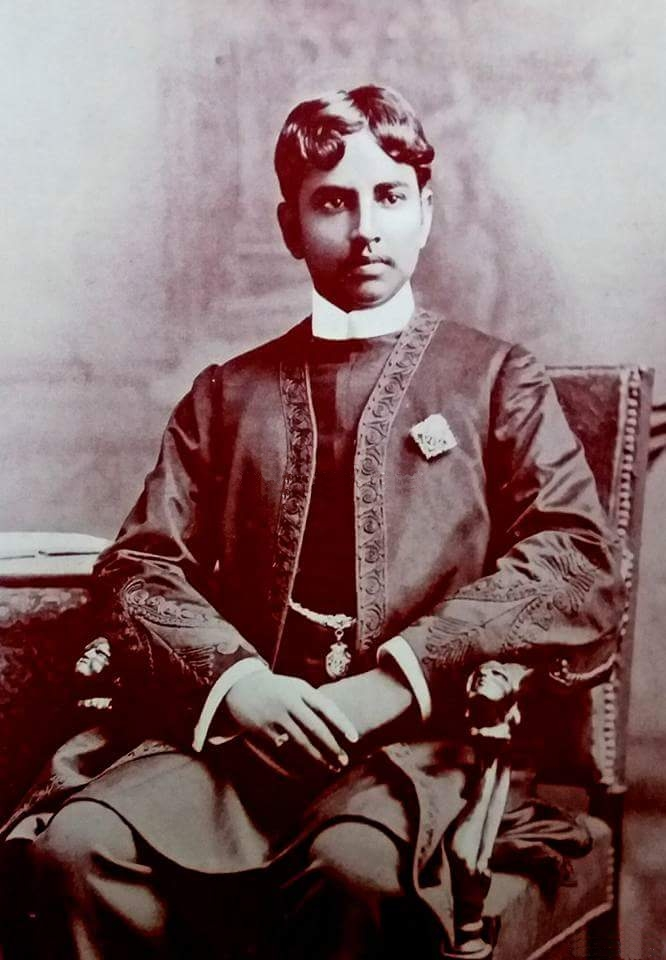
Maharaja Manmatha Nath Roy Chowdhury

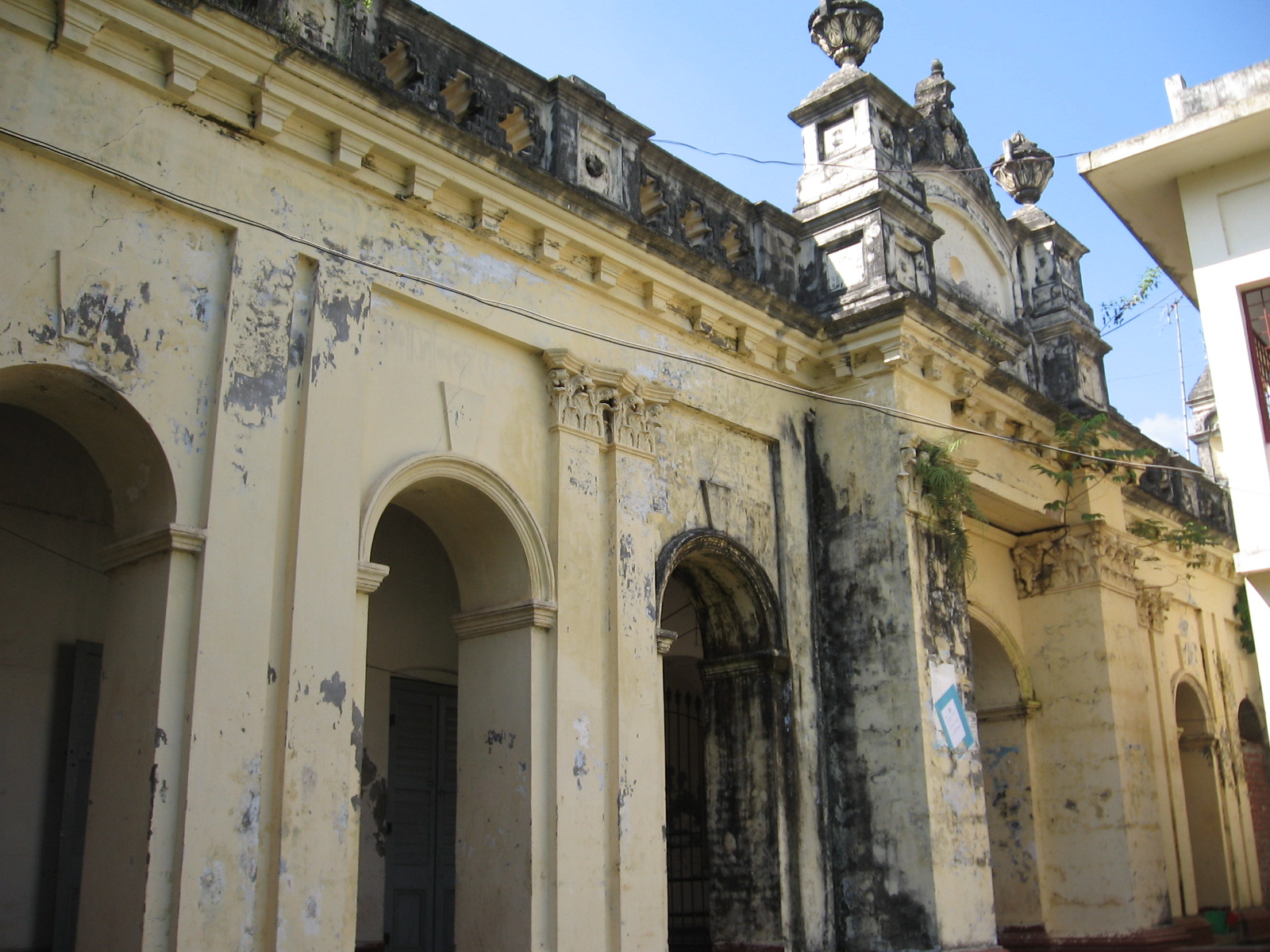
The abandoned Santosh Rajbari

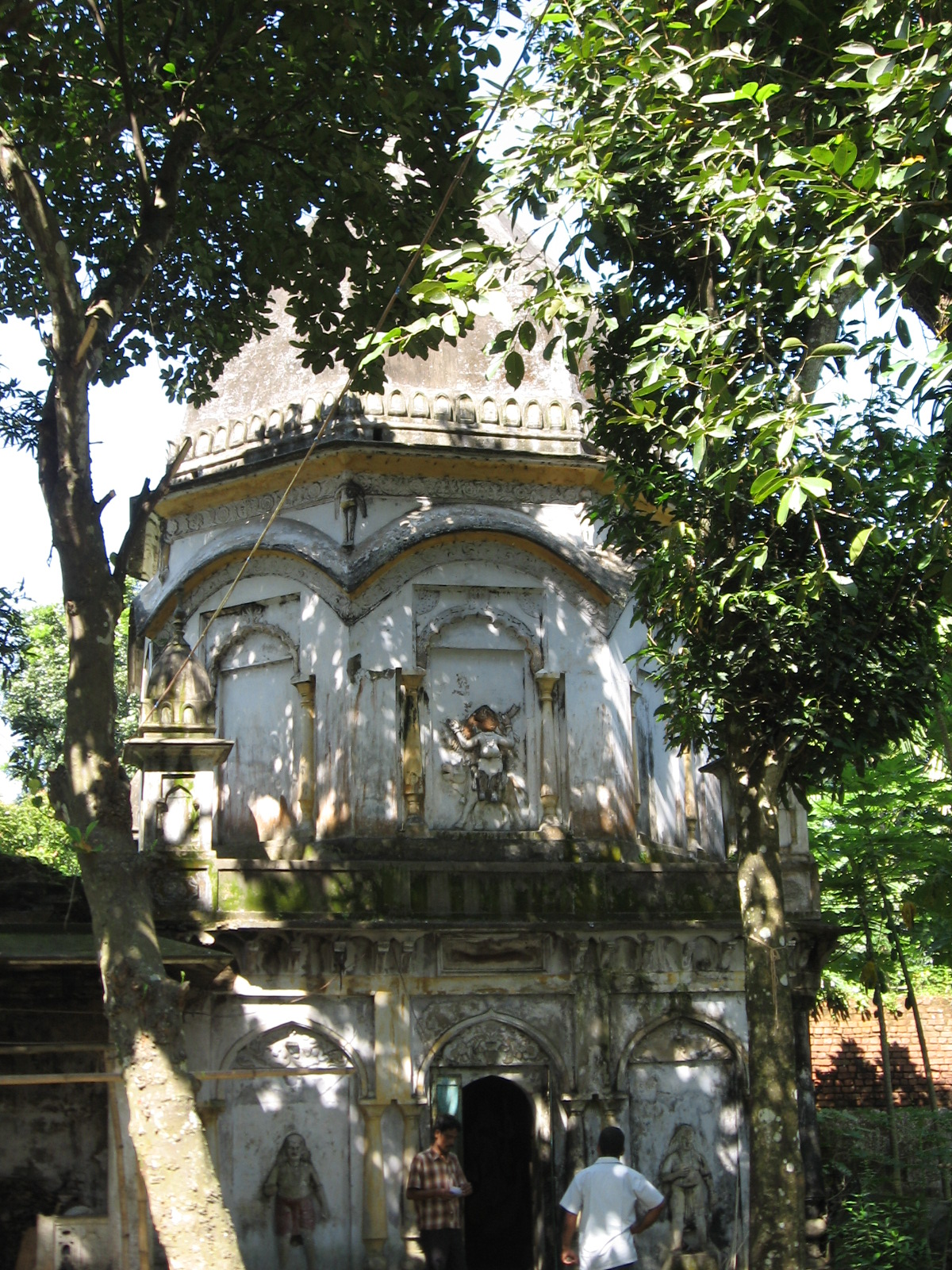
The temple attached to Santosh Rajbari
