= Berabuchina =

Berabuchna বেড়াবুচিনা
- Mahalla
- Interactive map of Berabuchna
- Coordinates: 24.207501°N 89.901534°E
- Country: Bangladesh
- Division: Dhaka Division
- District: Tangail District
- Time zone: UTC+6 (BST)
- Postal Code: 1207

Berabuchina (also spelt as Berabuchna) is a mahalla (neighborhood) in Ward No. 11 in the Bangladeshi city of Tangail.

== History ==
Santosh, 2 km from Berabuchina, is the place where Biswanath Choudhury established the Santosh zamindari, that had control over the surrounding area, including Berabuchina, and his son Manmatha Nath Roy Chowdhury (1883–1939) made it famous with his philanthropic and other activities, The last zamindar, Golok Nath Roy Choudhury, migrated to India with his family after abolition of the zamindari system.

== Personality ==
Jnanjan Niyogi, a noted freedom fighter and a social reformer, belonged to a family which had hailed from Berabuchina.

== Geography ==
Union Parishads in Tangail Sadar Upazila
U:union parishads, M: mahalla or neighbourhood
Owing to space constraints in the small map, the actual locations in a larger map may vary slightly

Berabuchina is in Tangail municipal corporation and is situated on the banks of the Louhajang River in a floodplain near the Jamuna River, which contributes to its fertile land. It is 83 kilometers northwest of Dhaka, the capital of Bangladesh. The city experiences a tropical savanna climate, characterized by hot, humid summers and warm, dry winters.

== Demographics ==
Berabuchna had a total population of 3,194 in 734 households as per 2011 census.

In the administrative unit of Berabuchna in ward no 11 of Tangail Poursabha, Berabuchna had a population of 3194 of which 3170 were Muslims and 24 were Hindus.

== Economy ==
Approximately 6 to 7 lakh looms, including both hand and power looms, are currently operating in Bangladesh. Most are concentrated in Pabna, Sirajganj, Tangail, Narsingdi, and the hill districts. The number of handlooms has been declining every year, while power looms are on the rise and about 1 lakh handlooms remain closed at present due to economic factors.

Mir Shanowar Ali owns the Agro and Dairy Farm in Berabuchna, indicating the rise of expansion of alternative means of earning.

== Education ==
Berabuchna Government Primary School is a Bengali-medium school.

Mawlana Bhashani Science and Technology University at Santosh nearby.

== Facilities ==
As per 2011 census, Berabuchna had 726 households. 89.8% of the households drew their water from tube wells and 10.2% households used tap water. 97.5% of the households had electricity. 77.4% of households owned their houses.

A large water tank of Tangail Pourosava is located in Berabuchina.

== Pictures ==
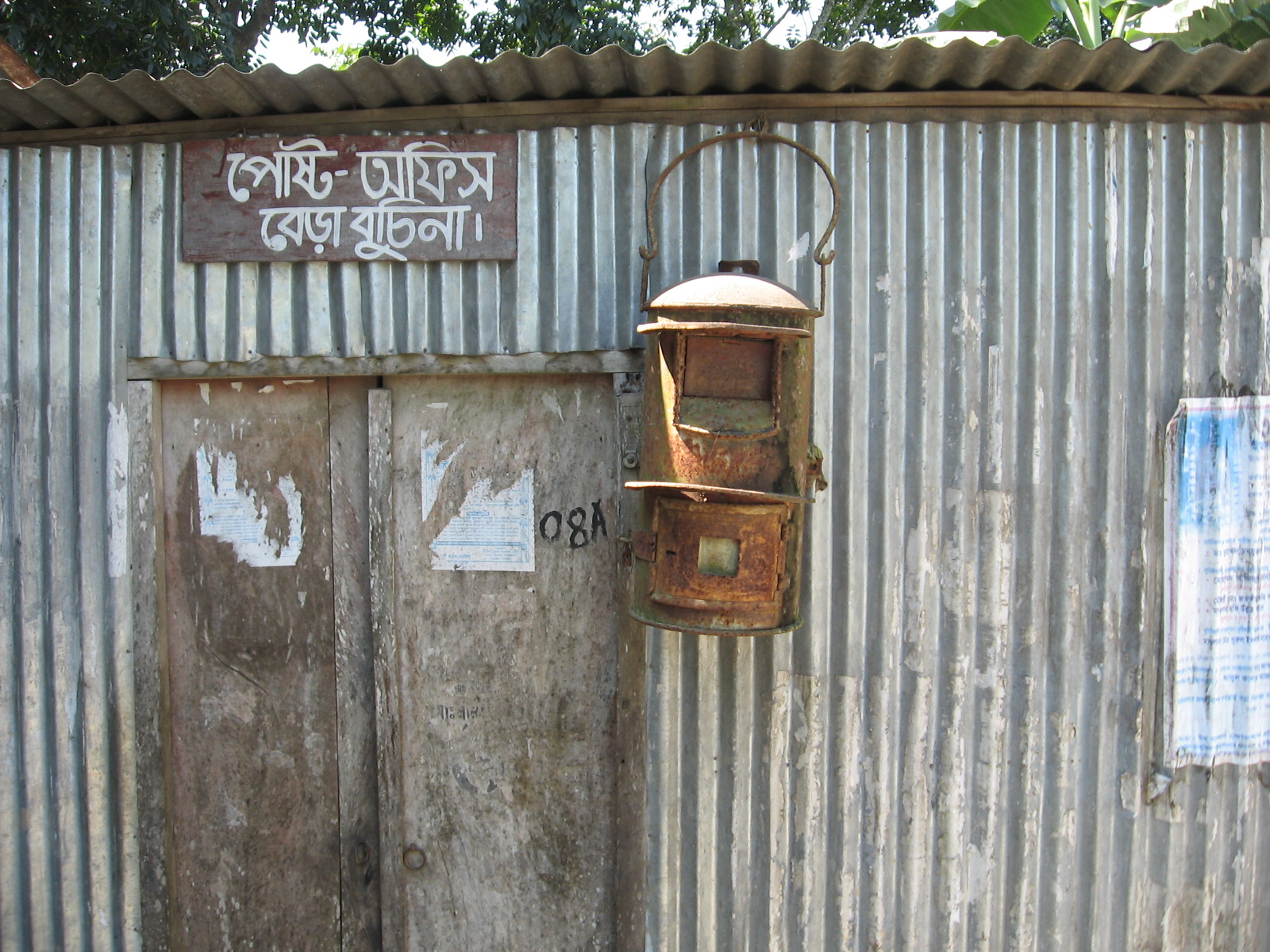
Berabuchina Post Office

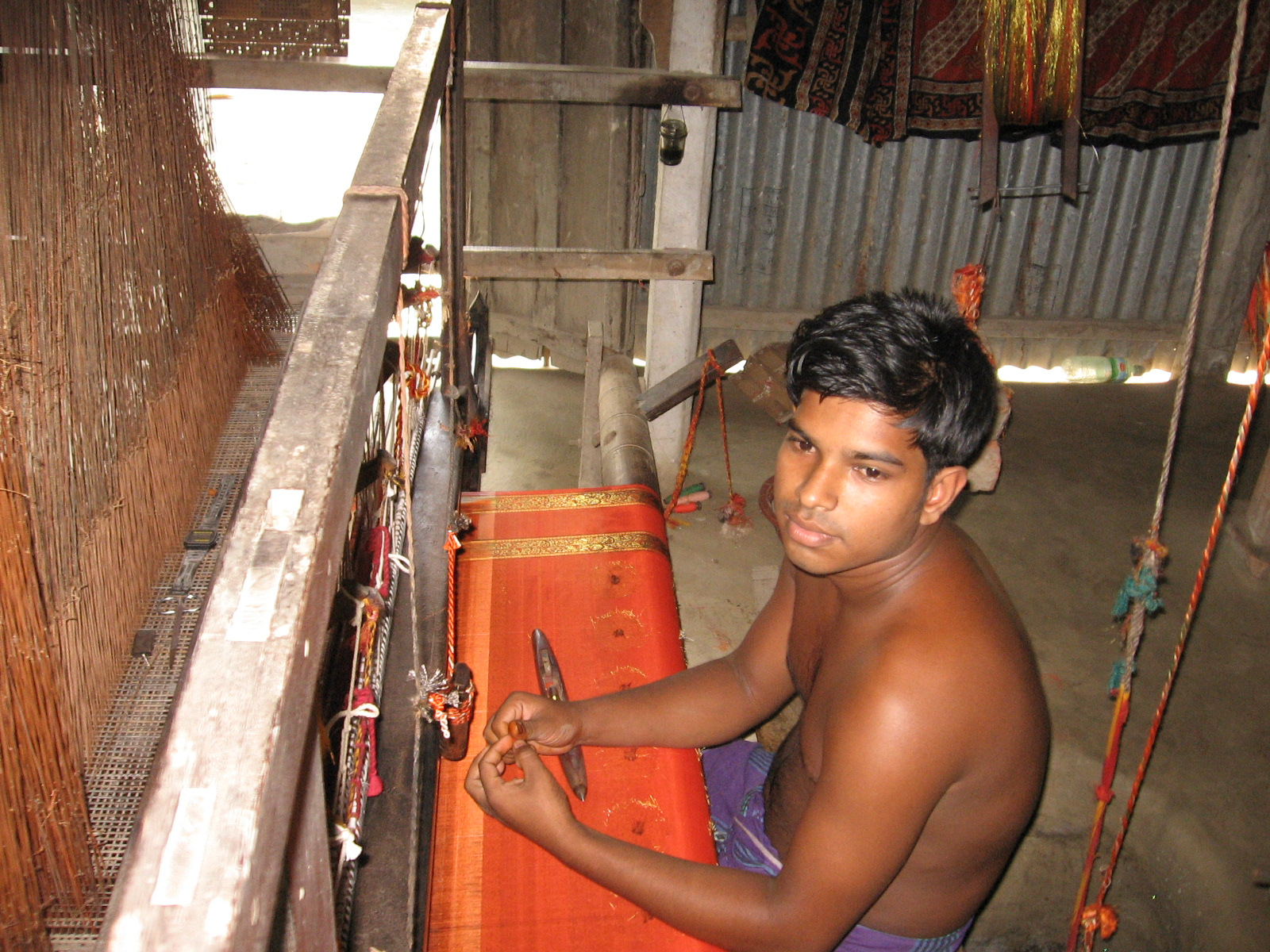
A weaver Berabuchina

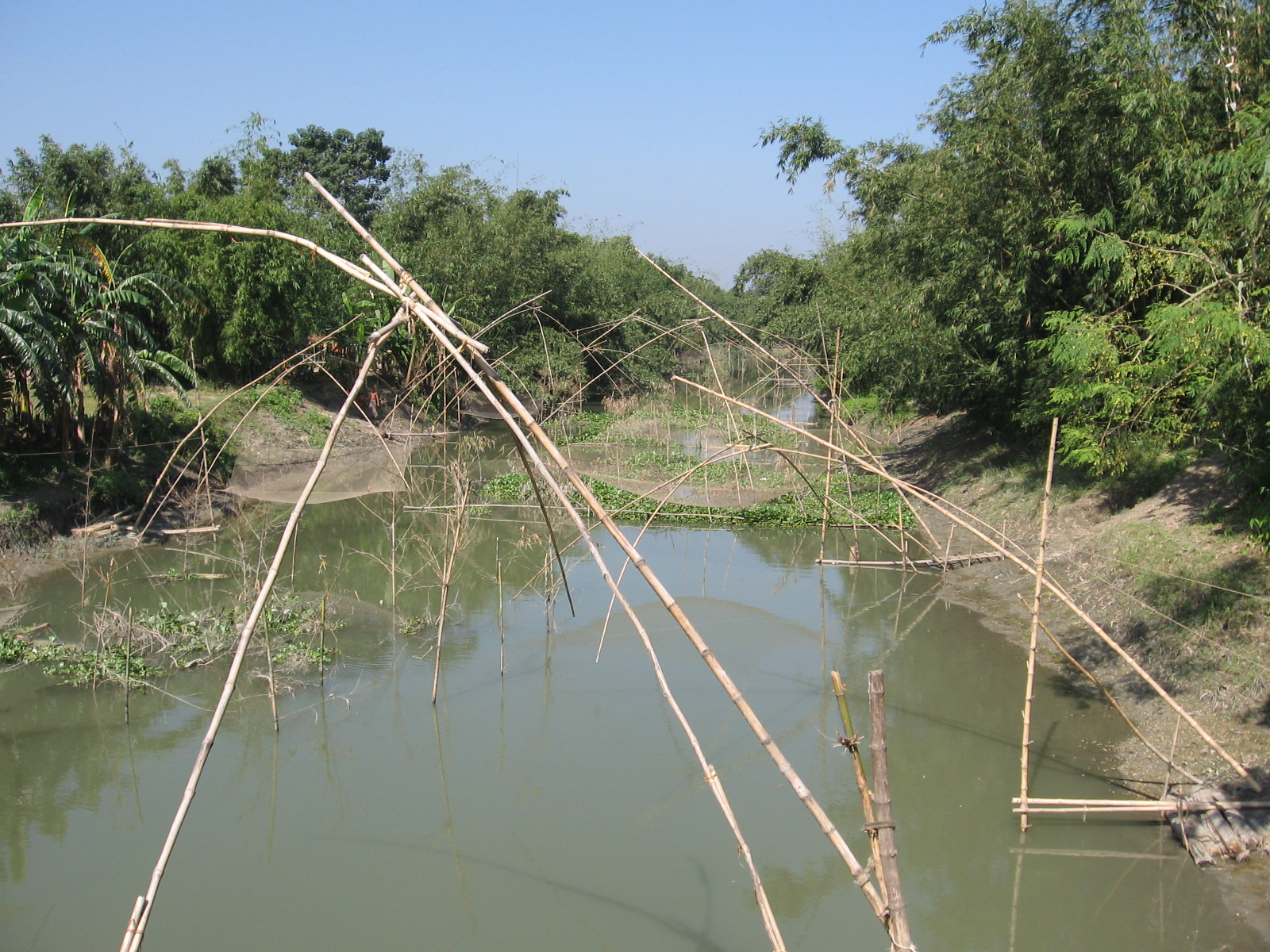
Louhajang River near Berabuchina

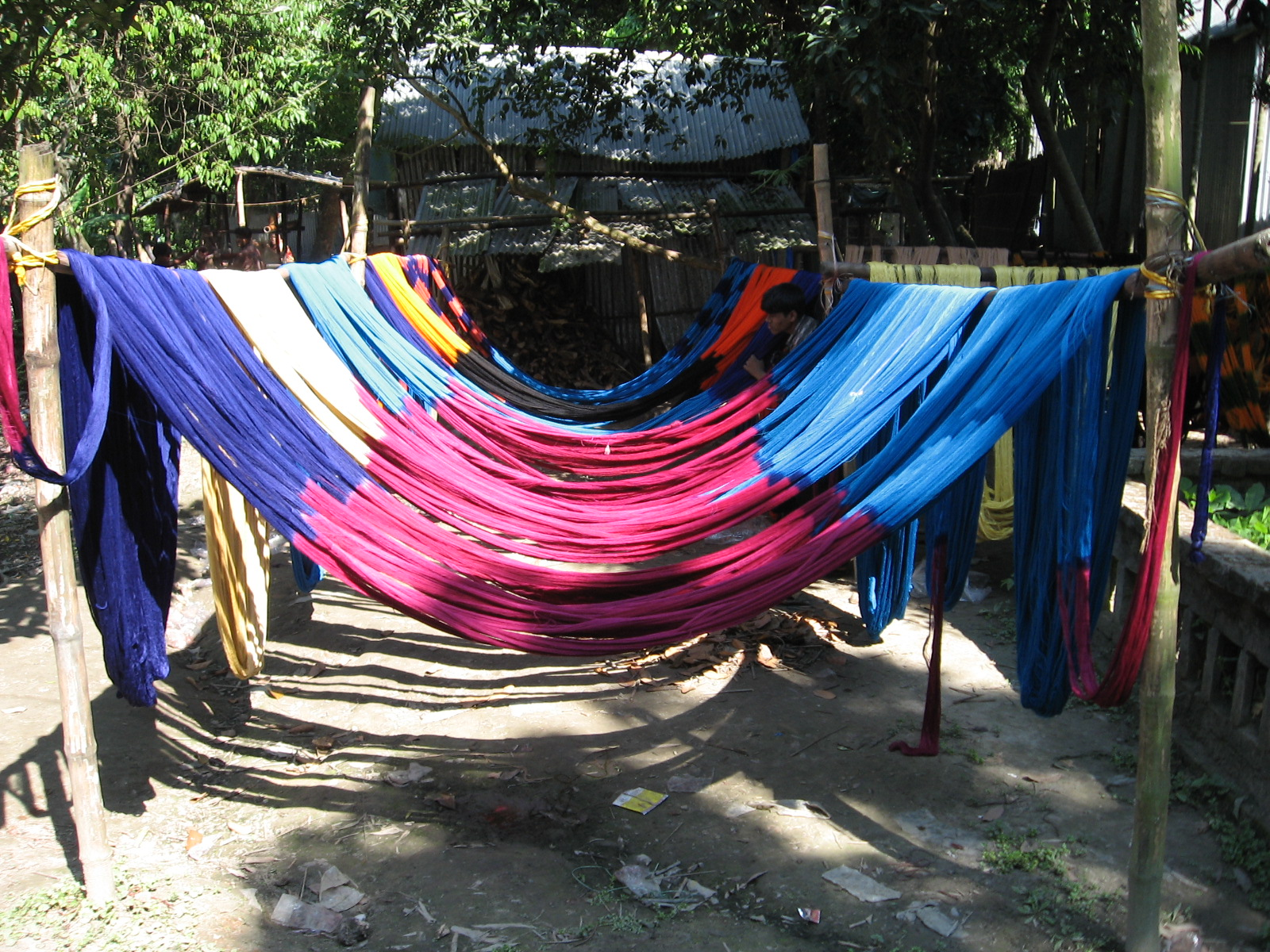
Coloured coton thread left to dry in Aloa village adjacent to Berabuchina

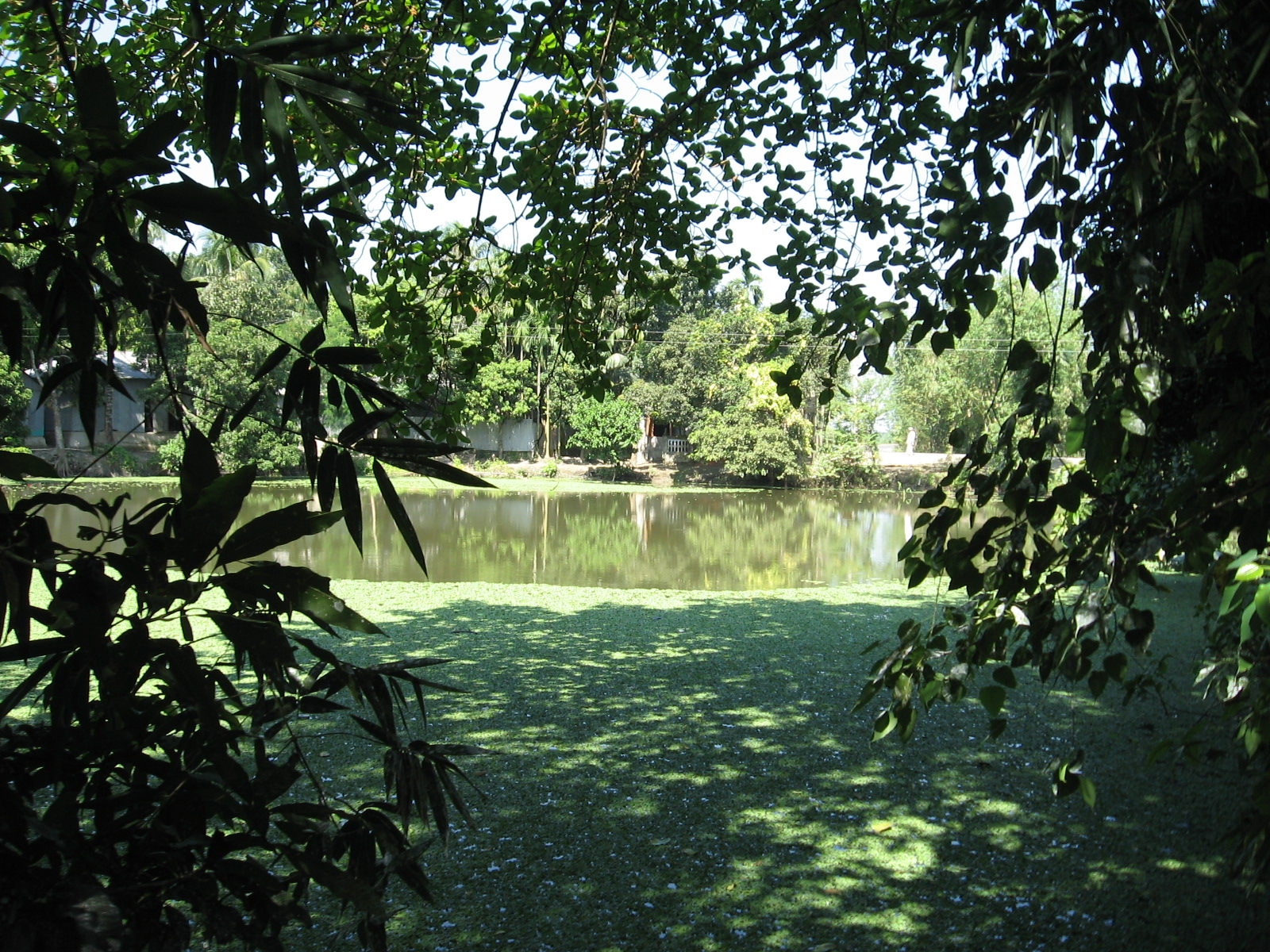
A pond in Berabuchina

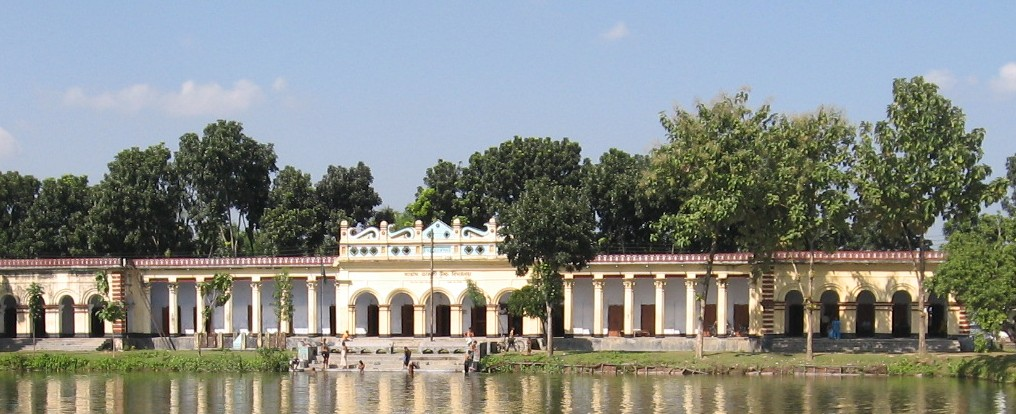
Jahnavai High School in Santosh as seen from the road to Berabuchina
