= Jnanjan Niyogi =

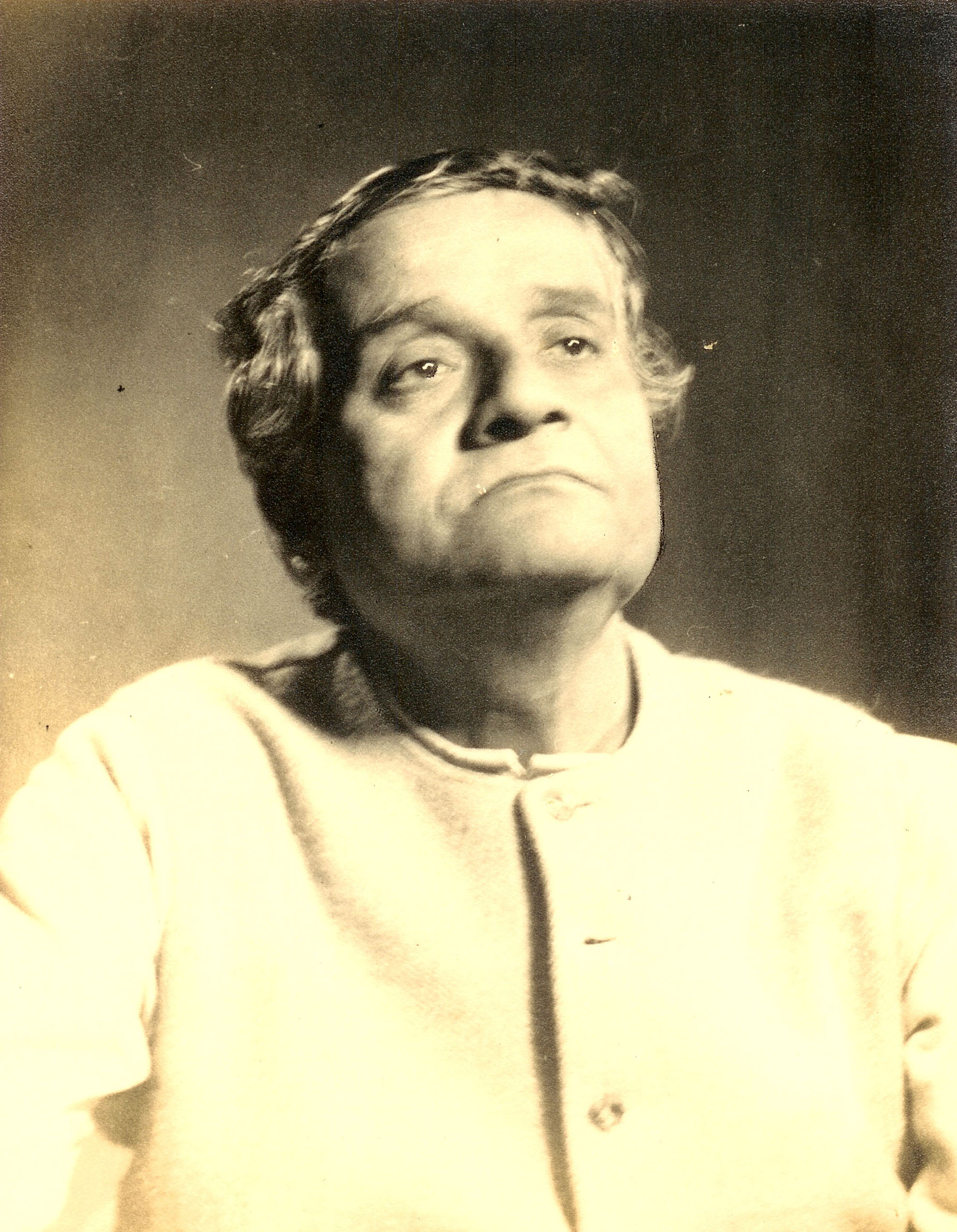
- Born: 7 January 1891; Gaya
- Died: 13 February 1956; Kolkata
- Occupation: Freedom fighter
- Organisation: Indian National Congress
- Known for: Role in Indian freedom struggle and social reforms
- Movement: Indian independence movement

Jnanjan Niyogi was an Indian independence activist and a social reformer.

He was born on 7 January 1891 at Berabuchina, now in Bangladesh. his parents, Braja Gopal and Sumangala Niyogi, had taken up the ideals of the Brahmo Samaj. Braja Gopal Niyogi was inspired by the religious convictions of his maternal uncle, Hari Sundar Bose, who had settled at Gaya, in Bihar. Braja Gopal first moved with his family to Gaya and then shifted to Bankipore, where Jnananjan had his schooling.

Jnananjan got interested about the Indian independence from his younger days. In 1905, when the British government, partitioned Bengal, it struck a chord in his mind. He was opposed to the addiction to alcoholic drinks and presided over an organisation, the 'Temperance Federation', set up to combat that evil. Keshub Chunder Sen, the Brahmo Samaj leader had set up an organisation named 'Calcutta Working Men's Institution' for the advancement of poor people living in the slums. However, it was closed down. In 1909, he revived it. It had regular school classes and also taught the students to master handicrafts like book binding, tailoring and other such trades that could be a source of earning in future. In 1916, he started an organisation named 'Band of Hope' to attract youngsters to the national cause.

He felt that people buy Indian goods in preference to foreign goods. He publicized local goods at fairs during Durga Puja and throughout the year at Barabazar. When Subhas Chandra Bose was mayor of Kolkata he proposed the setting up of a permanent outlet for the sale of local goods. Jnanjan set such an outlet on the first floor of the College Street Market. He helped to form the Pallisree Sangha for the village uplift movement.

Chittaranjan Das inspired him to form the Deshbandhu Pallisanskar Samiti.

A prolific writer, he published booklets such as 'Desher Dak' (Call of the Nation), 'Biplabi Bangla' (Revolutionary Bengal), 'Bharate Tular Chas' (Cotton Cultivation in India), 'Bharate Kaporer Itihas' (Historyof Textiles in India) and 'Bilati Bastra Barjon Koribo Keno' (Why Should We Boycott Foreign Clothes). As these booklets egained in popularity, the government banned some of these booklets and imprisoned. In 1931, he was sent to Buxa Fort then a prison "for dangerous revolutionaries".

He toured Bengal village to enhance the consciousness of the poor and uneducated folk about the independence movement.
