= Manmatha Nath Roy Chowdhury =

Bengali aristocrat and writer (born 1939)

- Maharaja
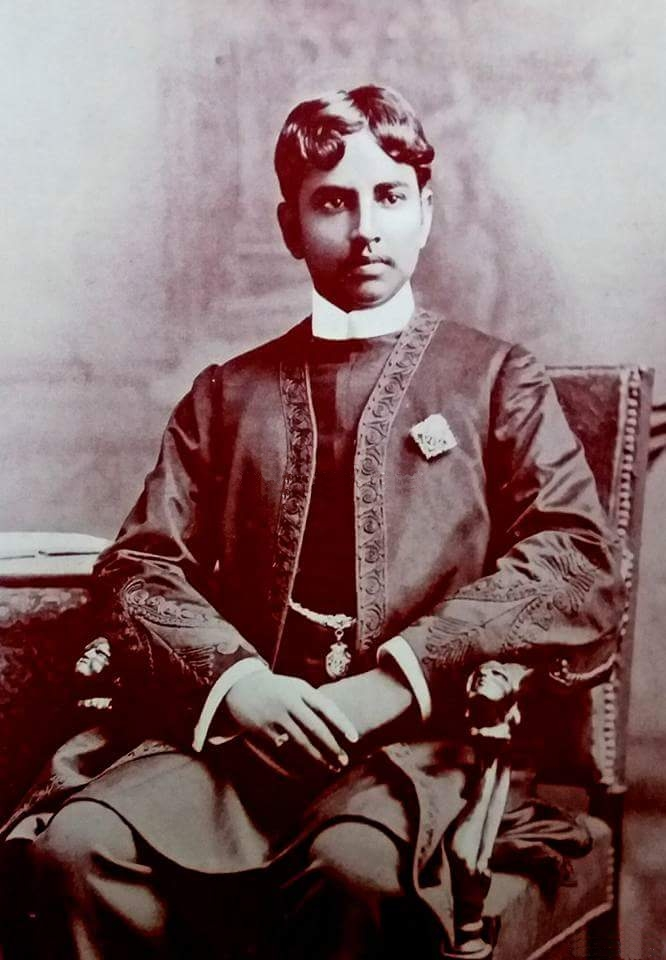
- Manmatha NathRayChowdhury, Maharaja of Santosh

Manmatha Nath Roy Chowdhury (1883-1 April 1939), the Raja of Santosh, was a Bengali aristocrat, writer, politician and football administrator.

== Education ==
He received his education at St. Xavier’s College, the Hare School, and Presidency College in Kolkata.

== Family ==
He married and had three sons: Benoyendra Nath Roy Chowdhury, Rabindra Nath Roy Chowdhury, and Printendra Nath Roy Chowdhury.

== Santosh Trophy ==
Santosh Trophy, the annual football tournament started in 1941 and contested by states and government institutions in India, was named in his memory. The Maharaja was the president of the Indian Football Association for six years at the time of his death.

== See also ==
- Santosh Trophy
