= Santosh, Bangladesh =

Place in Dhaka Division, Bangladesh

Santosh সন্তোষ
- Mahalla
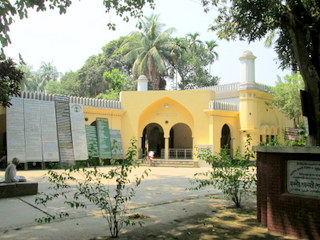
- Mazhar of Mawlana Abdul Hamid Khan Bhasani
- Interactive map of Santosh
- Coordinates: 24.234429°N 89.897164°E
- Country: Bangladesh
- Division: Dhaka Division
- District: Tangail District
- Time zone: UTC+6 (BST)
- Postal Code: 1902

Santosh is a Mahalla (neighbourhood) spread across Ward No. 7 and 8 of Tangail Sadr Pourasabha, Dhaka Division, Bangladesh.

== History ==
Biswanath Choudhury established the Santosh Zamindari, that had control over the surrounding area, including Berabuchina. The last zamindar, Golok Nath Roy Choudhury, migrated to India with his family after abolition of the zamindari system.

== Geography ==
Union Parishads in Tangail Sadar Upazila
U:union parishads, M: mahalla or neighbourhood
Owing to space constraints in the small map, the actual locations in a larger map may vary slightly

Tangail, of which Santosh is a part, is situated on the banks of the Louhajang River in a floodplain near the Jamuna River, which contributes to its fertile land. It is 83 kilometers northwest of Dhaka, the capital of Bangladesh. The city experiences a tropical savanna climate, characterized by hot, humid summers and warm, dry winters.

== Population ==
As per 2011 census Uttar Santosh has a total population of 1,595 in 445 households. Dakshin Santosh has a population of 5032 in 1,103 households.

== Education ==
Mawlana Bhashani Science and Technology University is in Santosh.

== Notable residents ==
The politician Abdul Hamid Khan Bhashani lived in Santosh.

== Gallery ==
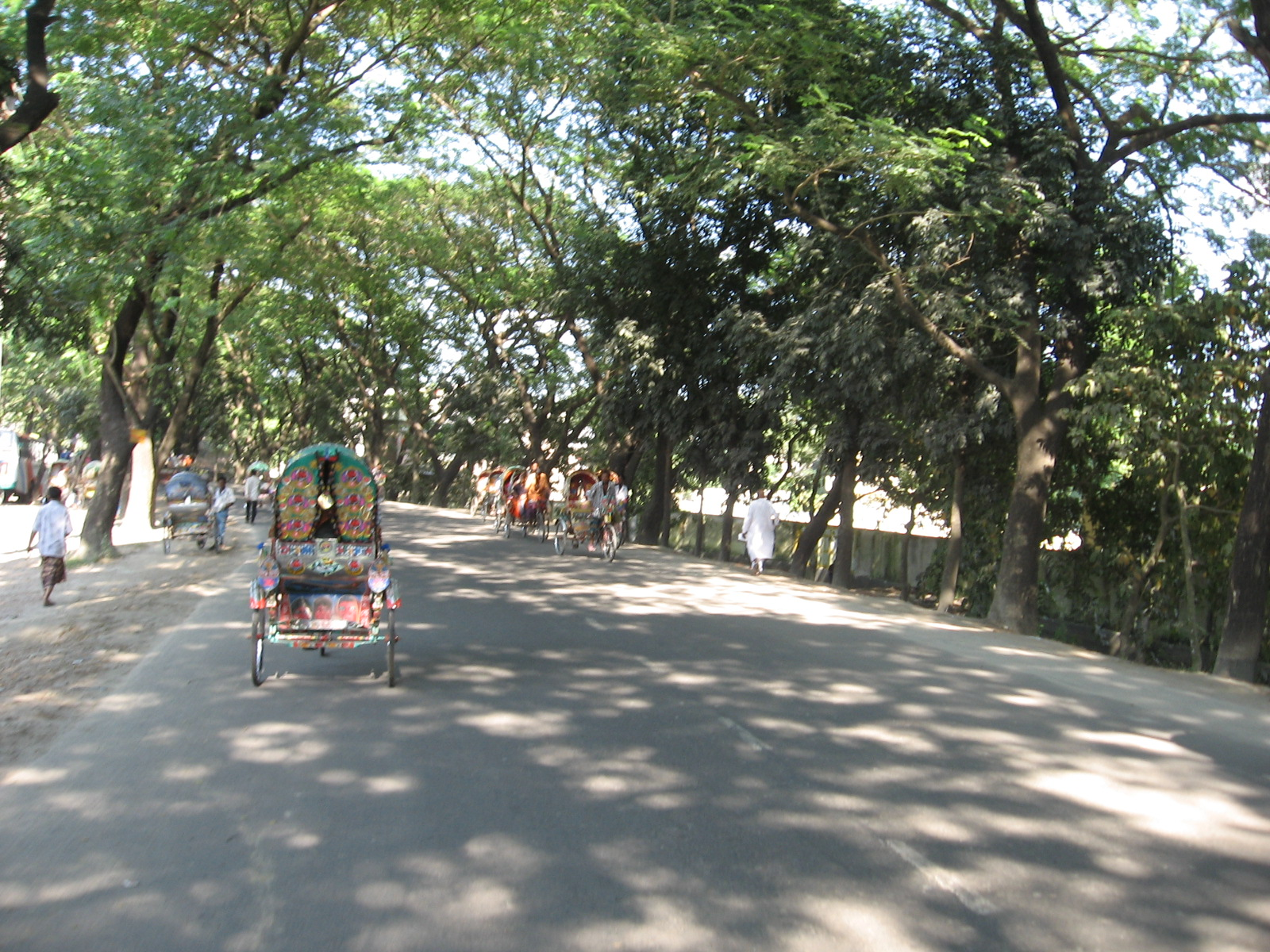
The road leading to Santosh

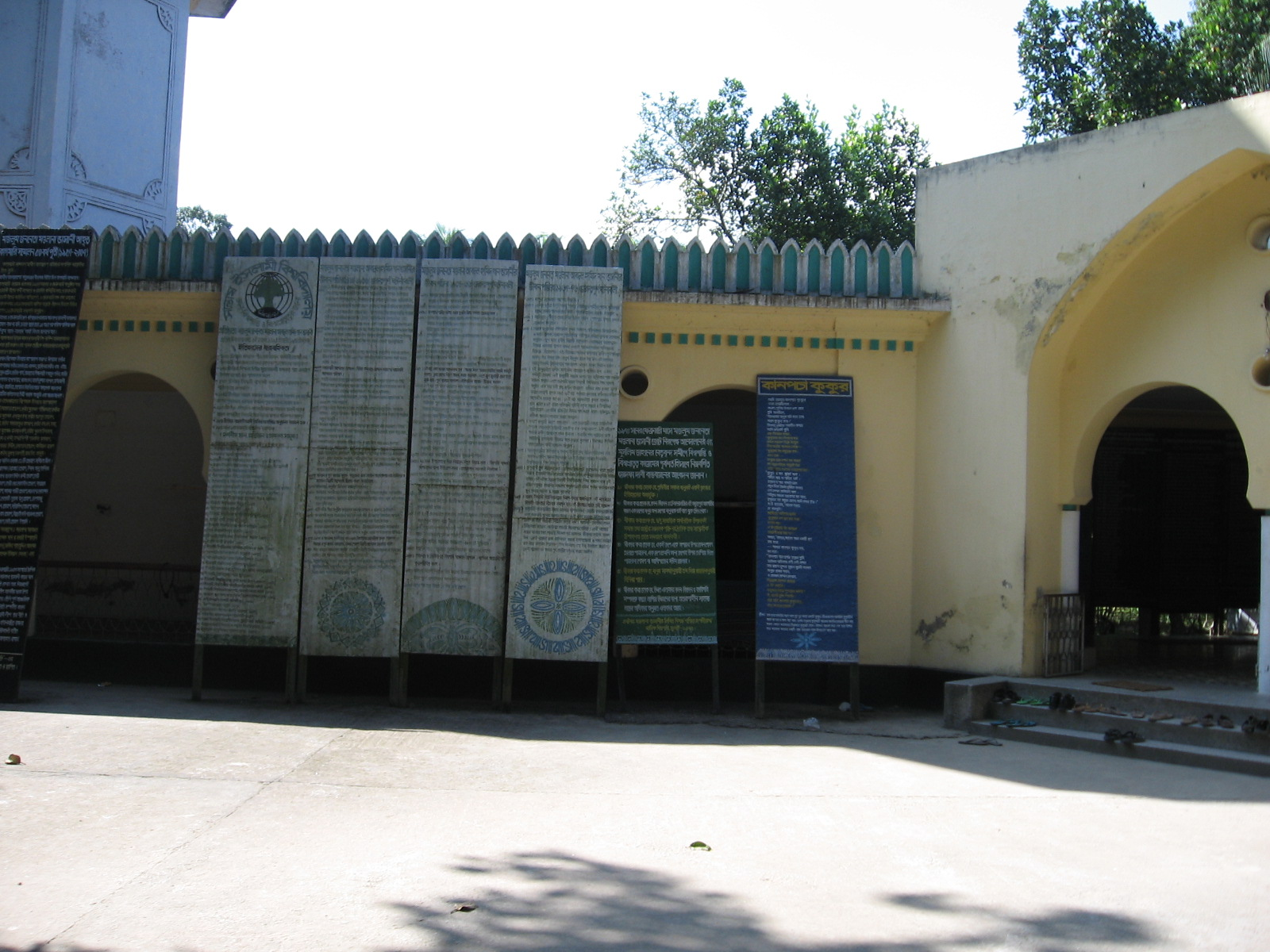
Mazahar of Mawlana Abdul Hamid Khan Bhasani

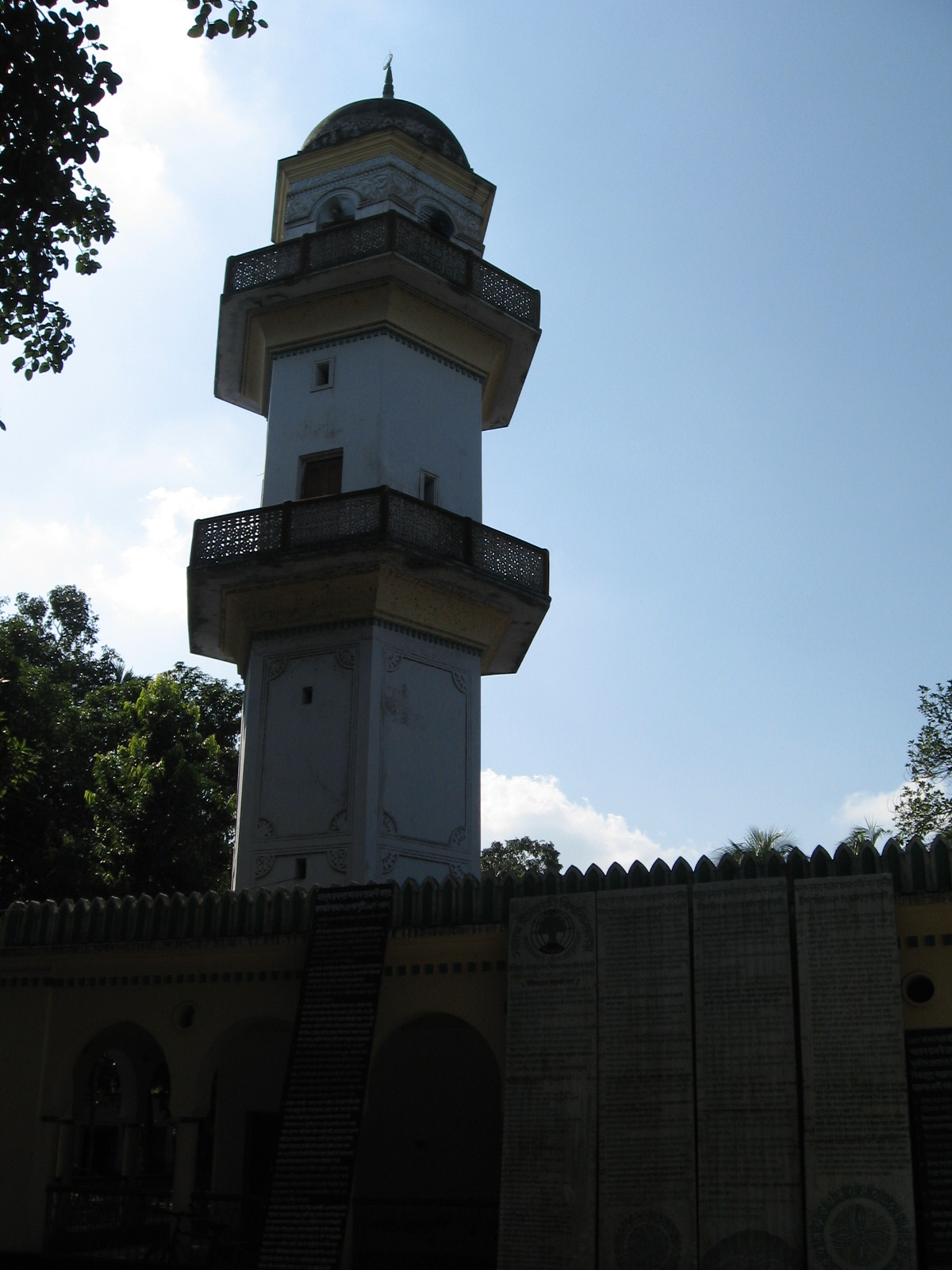
Minaret

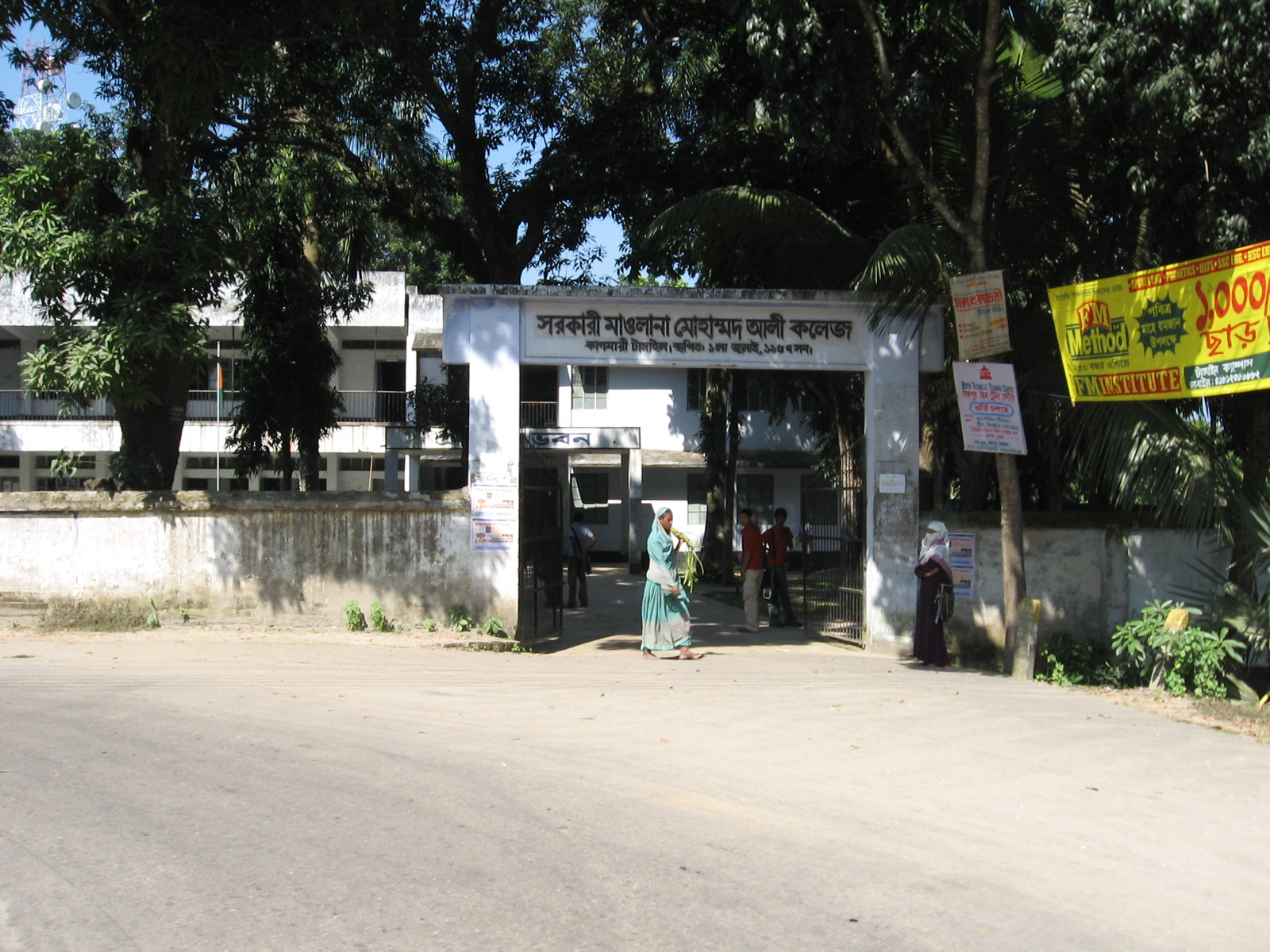
Entrance to Santosh College

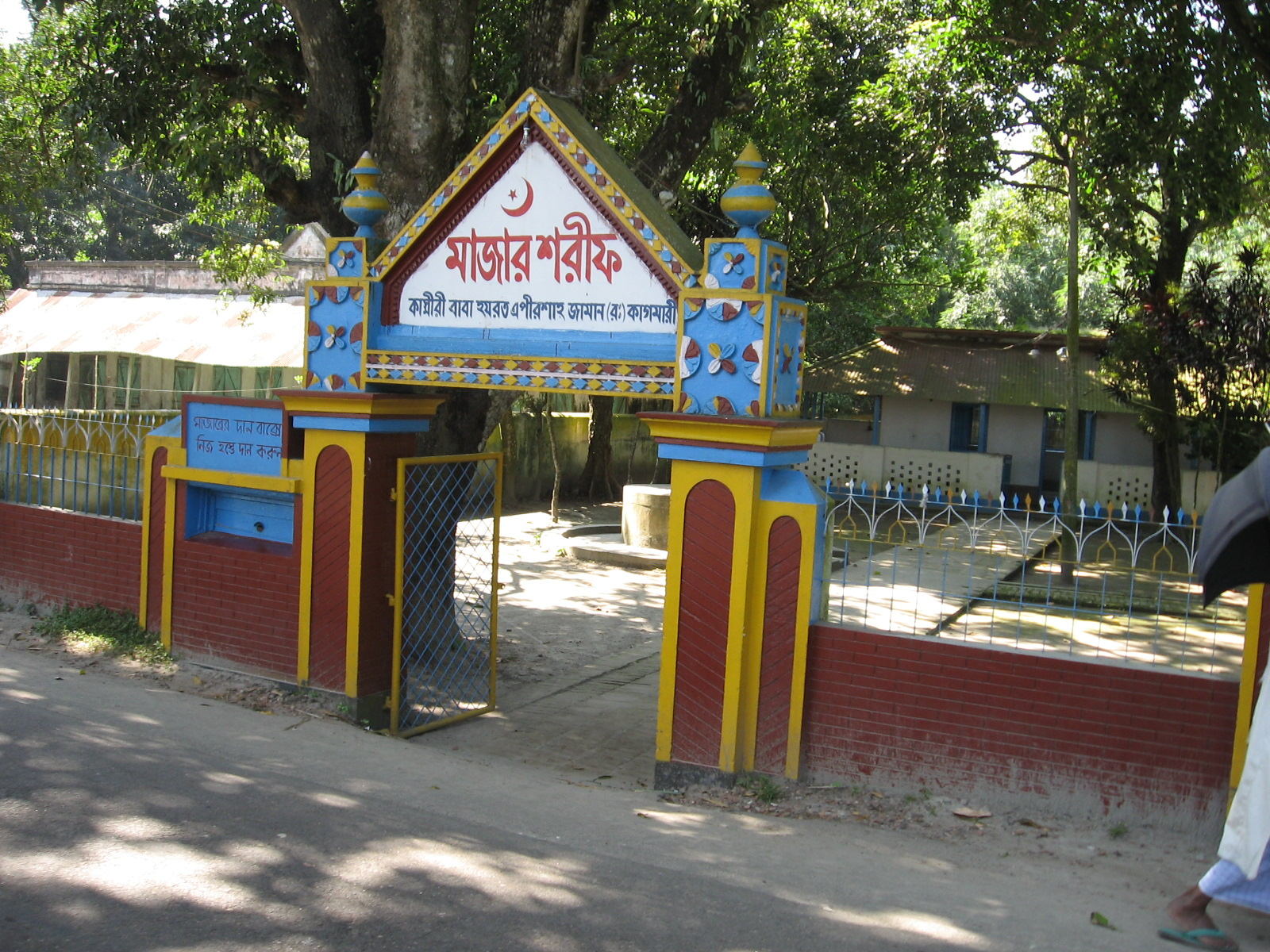
Mazhar Sharif in Santosh

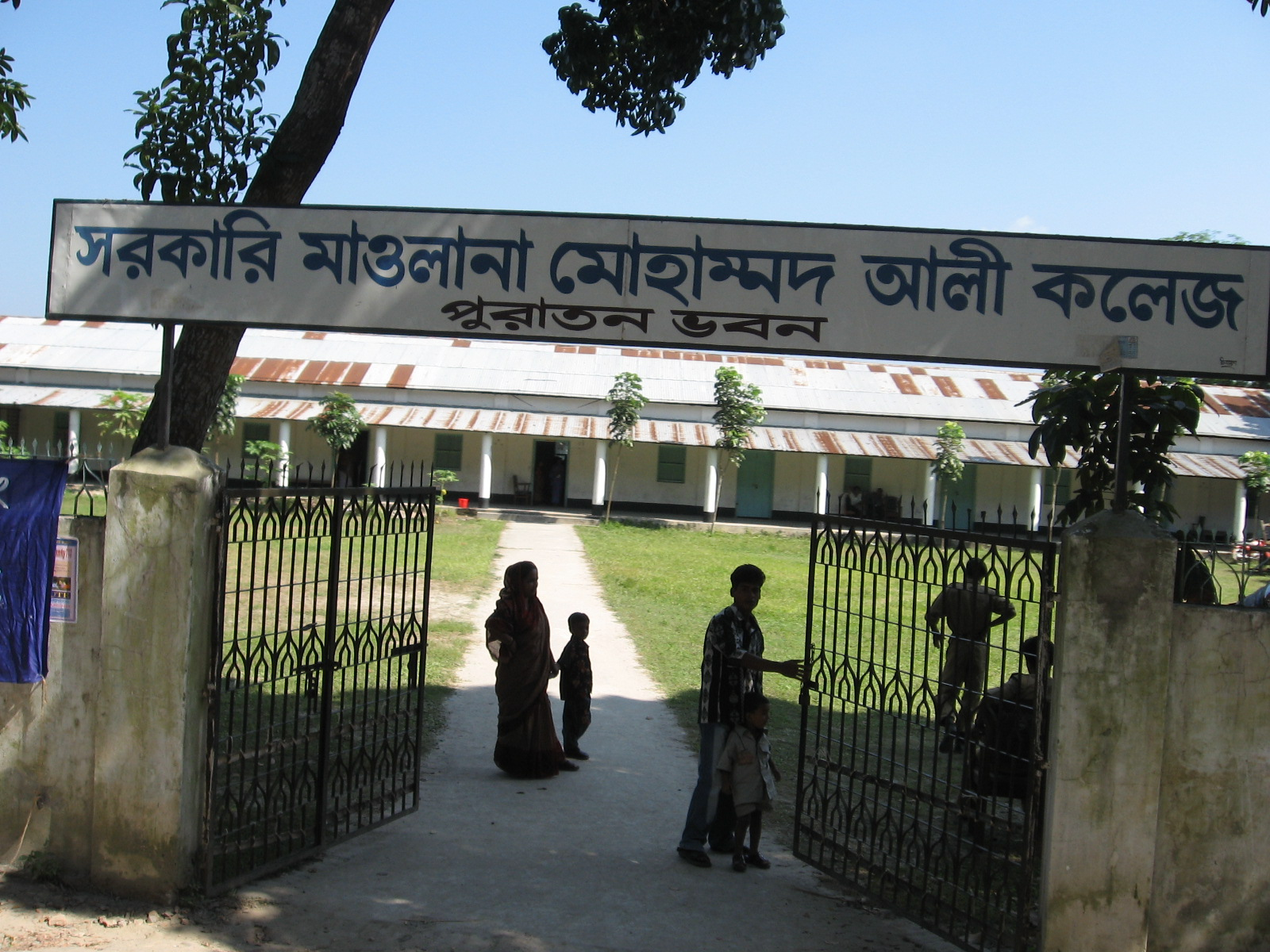
Government Maulana Mohammad Ali College

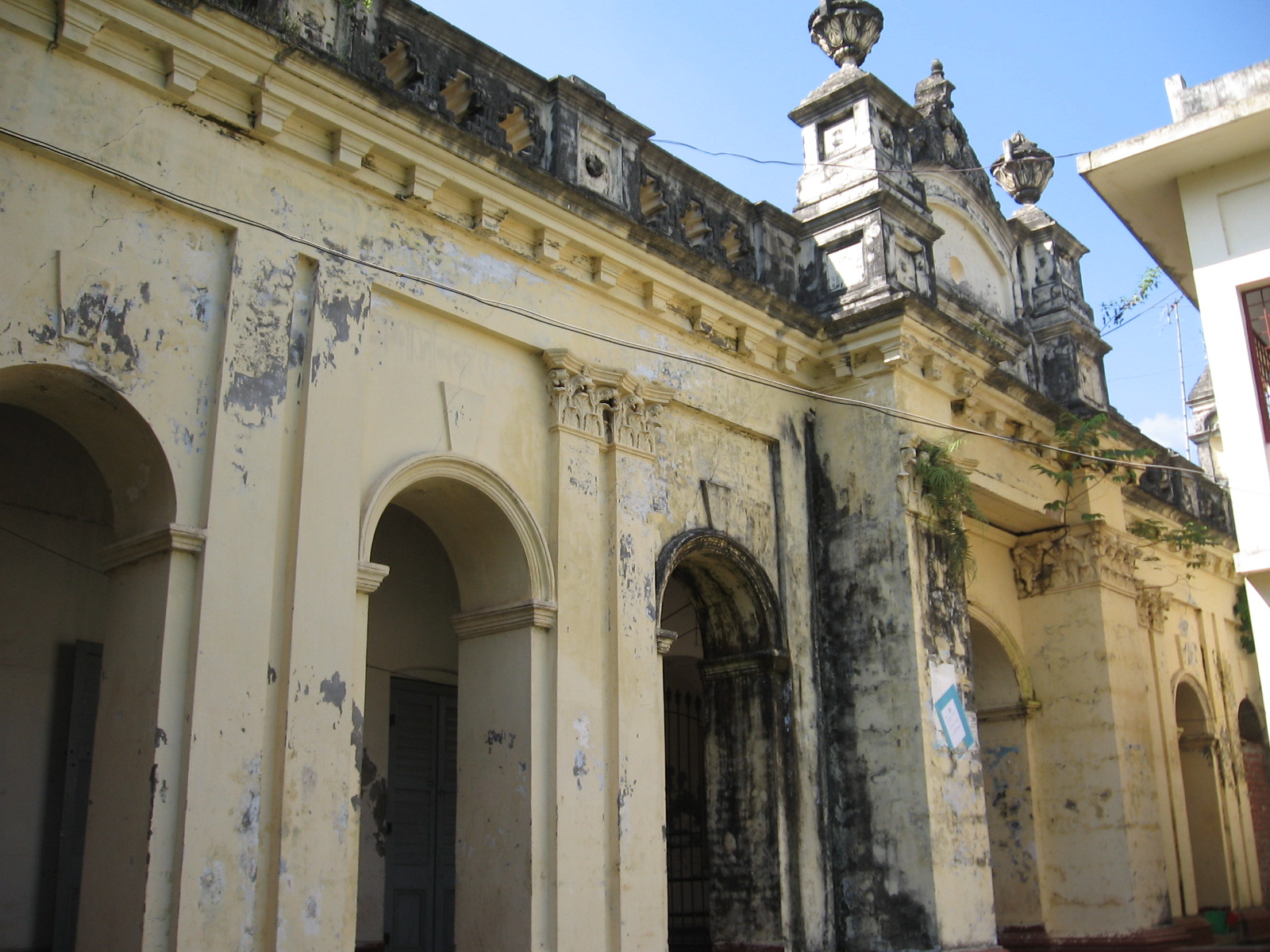
The abandoned Santosh Rajbari

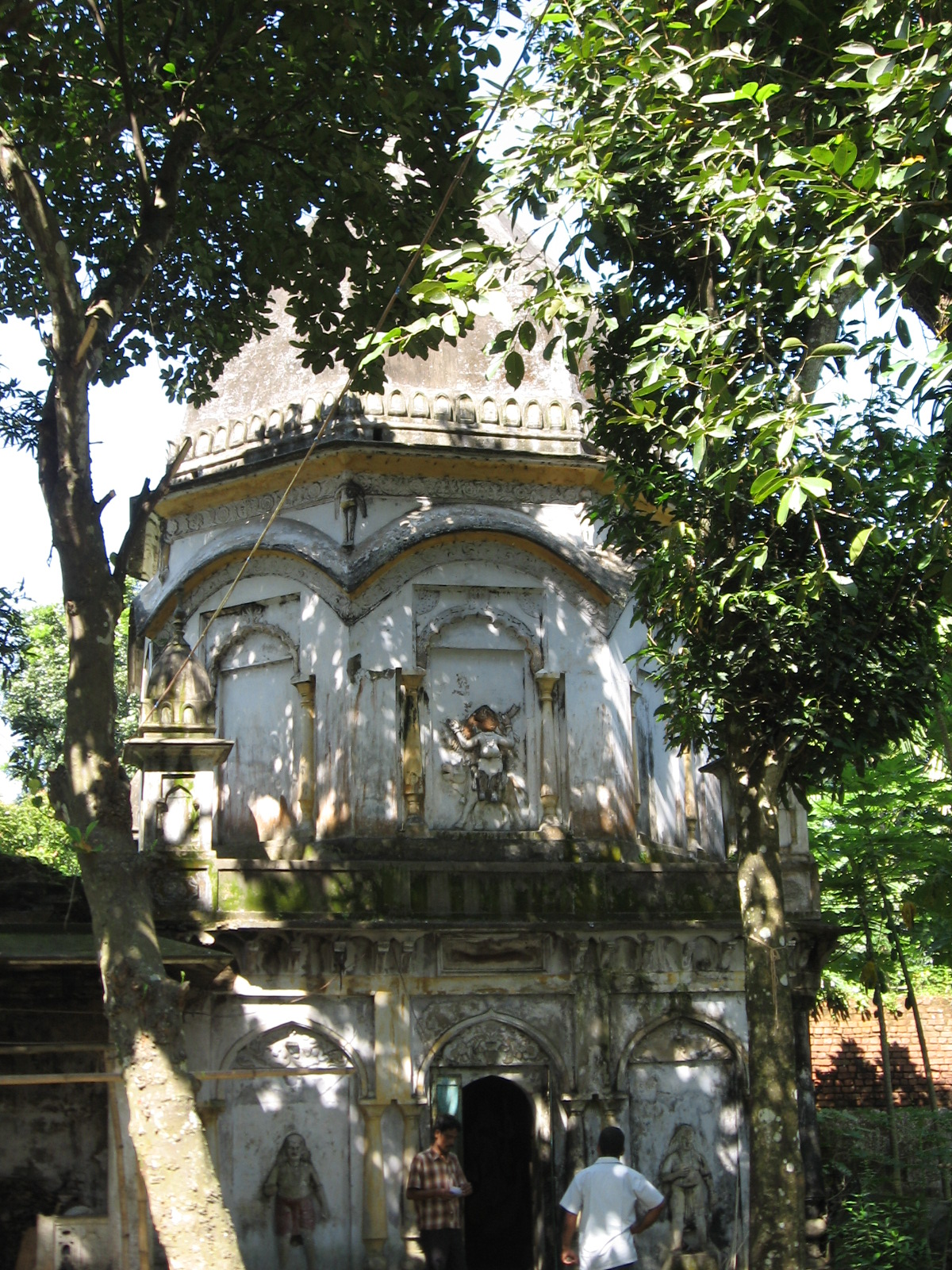
The temple attached to Santosh Rajbari

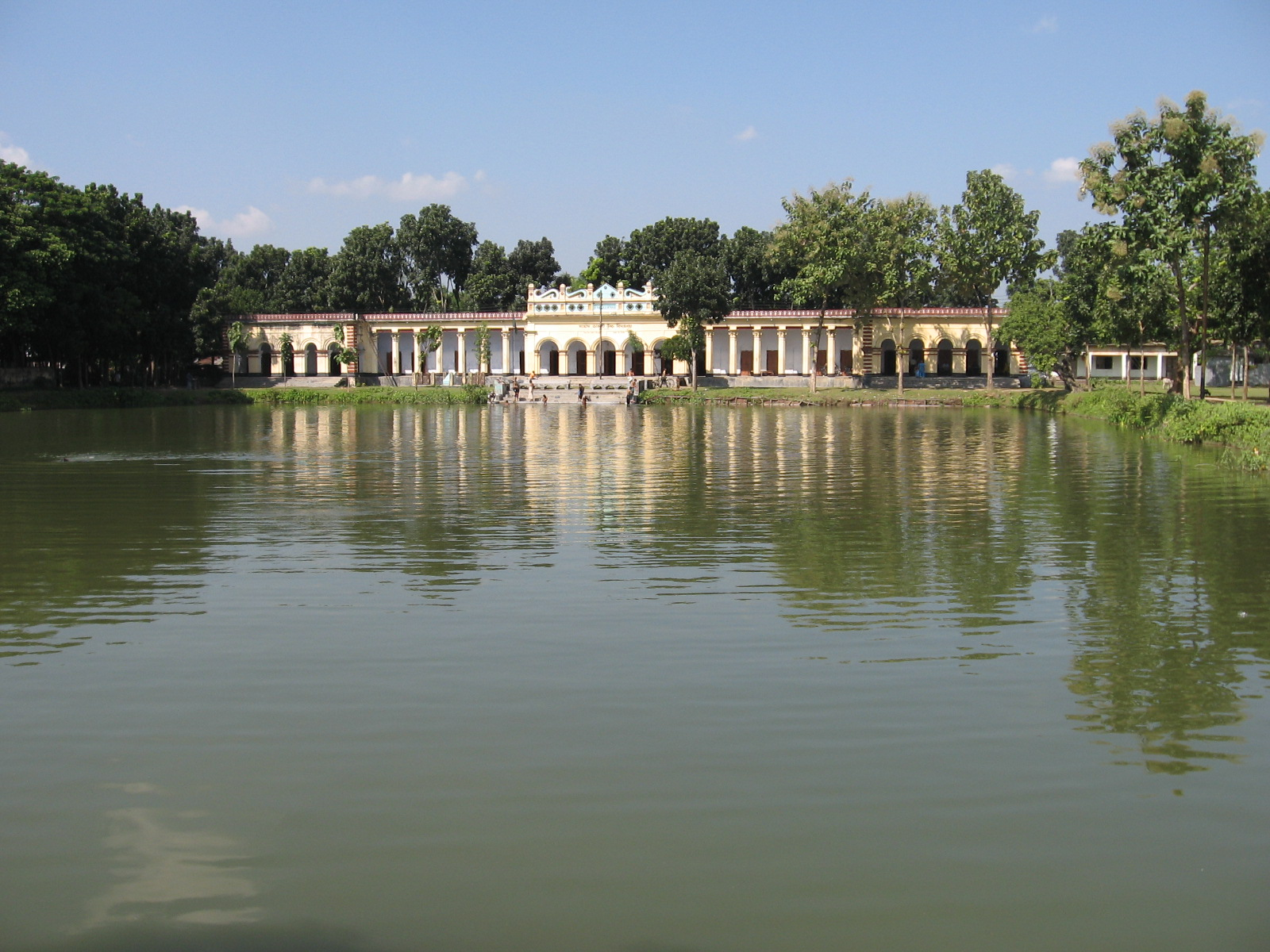
Jahnavi High School at Santosh
