= Kutupalong refugee camp =

Refugee camp in Ukhia, Cox's Bazar

Kutupalong refugee camp কুতুপালং শরণার্থী শিবির
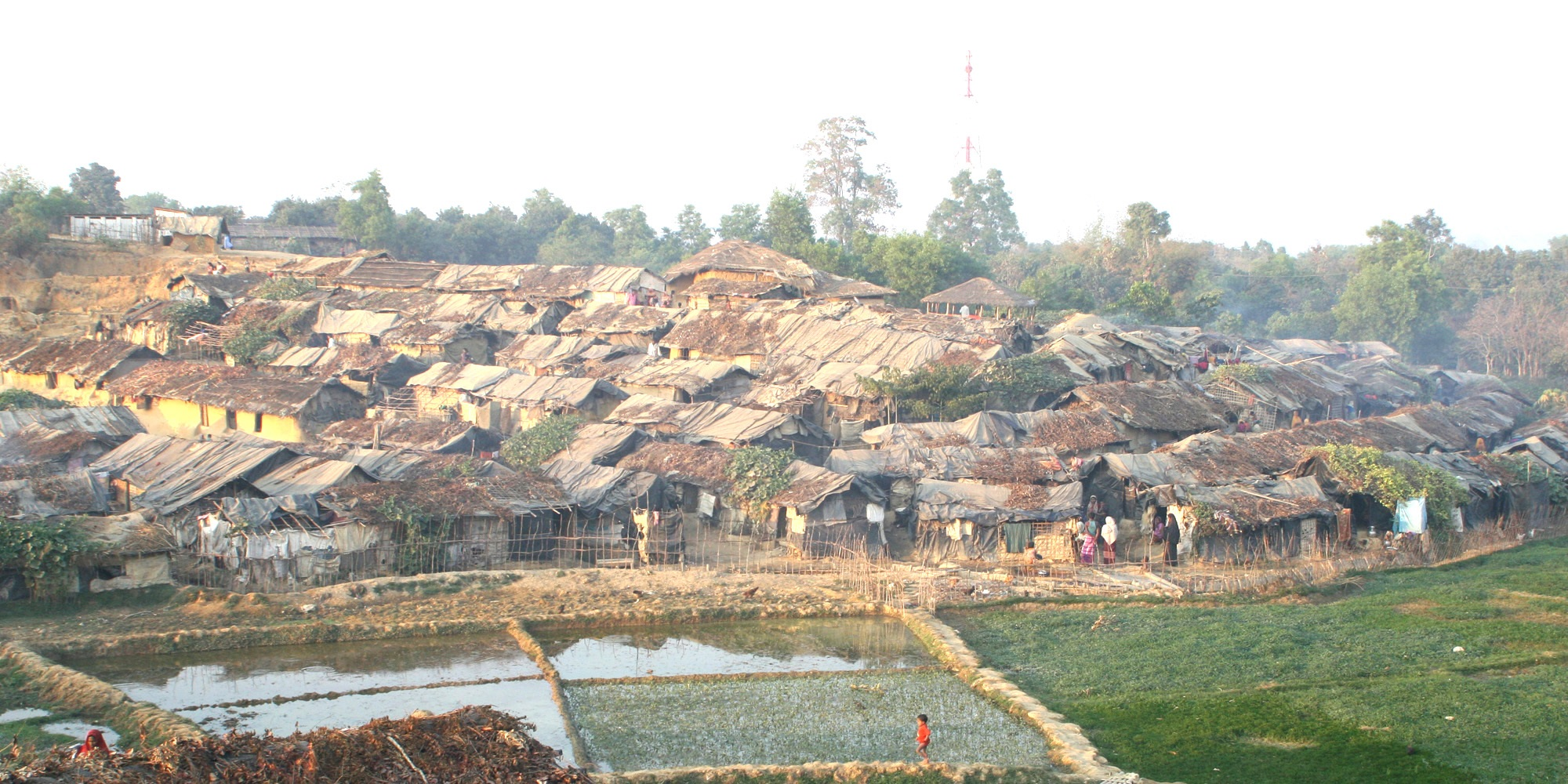
- Kutupalong refugee camp in Bangladesh

- Location in Bangladesh
- Coordinates: 21.2126°N 92.1634°E
- Country: Bangladesh
- Division: Chittagong Division
- District: Cox's Bazar District
- Upazila: Ukhia Upazila

Area
  - Total: 13 km^{2} (5.0 sq mi)

Population (31 December 2024)
  - Total: 686,766
  - Density: 53,000/km^{2} (140,000/sq mi)
  - Camp: 16,807 (Kutupalong RC); 669,959 (expansion site)

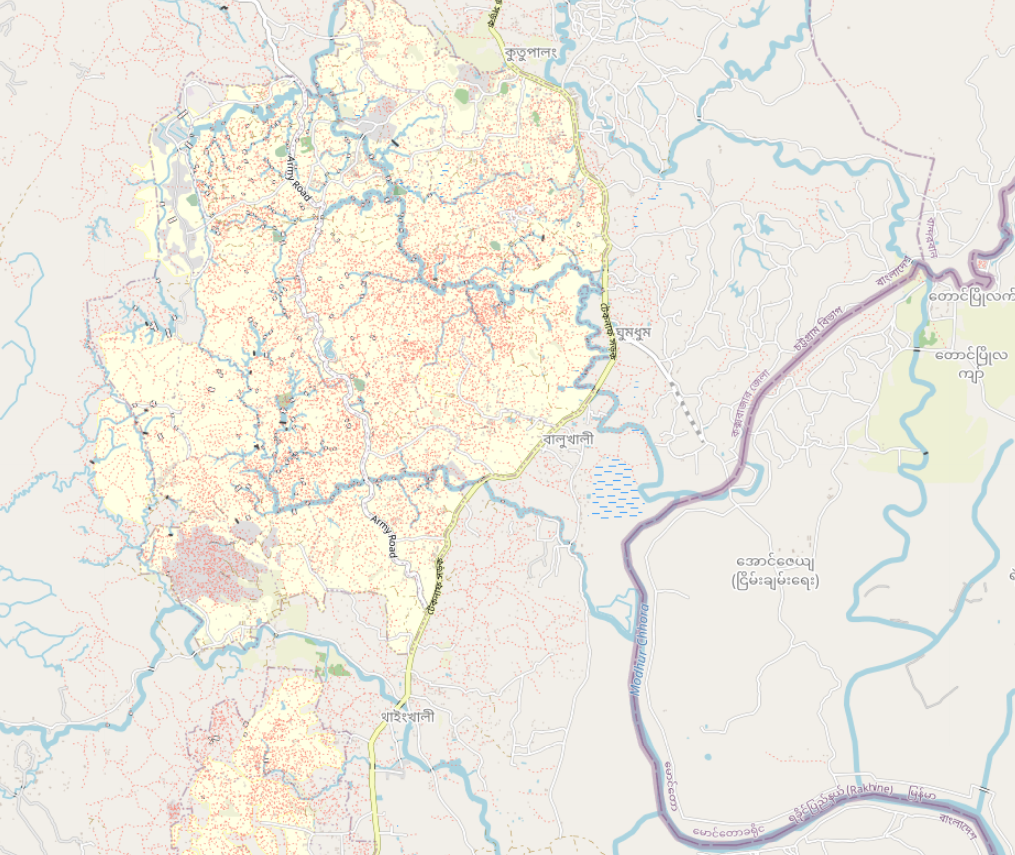
Kutupalong RC and its "expansion site" together with camps 14, 15, and 16

Kutupalong refugee camp (Bengali: কুতুপালং শরণার্থী শিবির, romanized: Kutupalong shoronarthi shibir) is the world's largest refugee camp. It is located in Ukhia, Cox's Bazar, Bangladesh, and is inhabited mostly by Rohingya refugees who fled from ethnic and religious persecution in neighboring Myanmar. It is one of two government-run refugee camps in Cox's Bazar, the other being the Nayapara refugee camp.

A cross-sectional study that was conducted back in 2013 among 148 Rohingya refugees from the Kutupalong and Nayapara camps suggested the likelihood of a high prevalence of mental health disorders like depression and PTSD.

The UNHCR camp office at Kutupalong is supported by seven international entities: the governments of the European Union, the United States, Canada, Japan, Finland, Sweden, and the Stichting INGKA Foundation.

With a population over 650,000 it is the sixth most populous urban area in Bangladesh as well as being the second most densely populated in the world.

== Name ==
Although the "Kutupalong Registered Rohingya Refugee camp," in Ukhia is the original camp, "Kutupalong refugee camp" may also refer to the makeshift camps that have sprung up adjacent to the government-operated camp, although these are not officially part of the refugee camp. Makeshift camps at Kutupalong and surrounding areas have grown to accommodate refugees fleeing Myanmar over the years. In late 2017, due to an unprecedented influx of refugees, the Kutupalong makeshift camp and surrounding camps at Ghumdum, Balukhali, Thangkhali, and others swelled rapidly, merging into each other. The International Organization for Migration refers to the collective settlement as the Kutupalong–Balukhali expansion site.

== History ==
=== Development and evolution ===
The camp began informally in 1991, after thousands of Rohingyas fled from the Burmese military's Operation Pyi Thaya (Operation Clean and Beautiful Nation).

The two refugee camps of Kutupalong and Nayapara had a combined population of around 34,000 registered refugees in July 2017.

Beginning 25 August 2017, extensive attacks upon Myanmar's Rohingya in Rakhine State by Myanmar's military and local civilians drove hundreds of thousands of Rohingya to flee Myanmar into Bangladesh, swelling the camp.

In early September 2017, Bangladesh's Disaster Management and Relief Minister said there was "no restriction on Rohingyas' entry" into Bangladesh, and those refugees would be sheltered "as long as they wanted." The Bangladesh government decided to bring all the Rohingya refugees "to a particular place," and build a camp for them in Kutupalong. The government's forest department allocated a portion of its 5,000 acres in Kutupalong for an expanded settlement. In all, 3,000 acres were allocated for a camp developed to accommodate up to 800,000 refugees. In September 2017, the United Nations High Commissioner for Refugees (UNHCR) estimated that the combined population of the two refugee camps had increased to over 77,000.

Since 2018, Kutupalong refugee camp has been the world's largest refugee camp.

With flimsy shelters built on steep hillsides, the camps are prone to flooding and landslides, particularly during monsoons. In August 2018, Human Rights Watch urged Bangladesh to relocate the camps to sturdier structures on safer ground in Cox's Bazar.

On 30 June 2020, the Kutupalong refugee camp and expansion site had a combined population of 598,545 and 187,423 families, in an area of just 13 square kilometres, giving an average population density of 46,042 people per square kilometre. As of June 2024, nearly 950,000 refugees are in the camps in Cox's Bazar.

=== Environmental issues ===
By late 2019, the development of the camps had been partially accomplished through the exploitation and destruction of 8,000 acres of forested area—including over 6,164 acres for living space, and 1,837 acres of forest for firewood and building materials (particularly bamboo), and other environmental losses, estimated to total about Tk24,200,000,000 (US$290,400,000) -- alarming local citizens, environmentalists, and government officials.

Critically endangered Asian elephants, whose natural habitat includes the area around Cox's Bazar, endanger camp residents because the camps are on the elephants' historical migratory route and grazing areas, resulting in human-elephant conflicts, which, by late 2019, had killed at least 13 Rohingya in the Kutupalong-Balukhali settlement. In response, officials of the UN High Commissioner for Refugees (UNHCR) and International Union for Conservation of Nature (IUCN) developed a mitigation program, which included hundreds of Rohingya refugee volunteers organized into Elephant Response Teams (ERTs) to respond to the events, typically driving elephants away through standardized techniques.

=== Restrictions ===
Local Bangladeshis have complained of Rohingya from the camps undermining natives' job prospects and becoming involved in criminal activity (particularly illicit drug trade in ya ba, a type of methamphetamine). Also, authorities have struggled to cope with human traffickers smuggling Rohingya into and out of Bangladesh (particularly by sea) and exploiting women and children for the region's sex trade. In response, the authorities have restricted Rohingya refugees' movements into and out of the camps, and limited their right to work or travel outside the camps—resulting in rising hardship and frustration for the refugees.

=== Relocation and repatriation attempts ===
==== Attempted repatriation to Myanmar ====
By mid-2018—as the burden of hosting nearly a million refugees (mostly at Kutupalong) became increasingly stressful and frustrating to the Bangladesh government and public—they began pushing for repatriation of the Rohingya back to Myanmar.

However, Rohingya refugees in Bangladesh refused to be repatriated due to continuing persecution and violence against the Rohingya still in Myanmar, and Myanmar's refusal to accept Rohingya demands to be reinstated as citizens, restored to their lands and property, granted freedom, and have international observers or peacekeepers to safeguard the Rohingyas' rights and safety—demands supported by international organizations. The Rohingya refugees boycotted and protested repatriation events in 2018 and 2019, and shortly after the last 2019 repatriation event, on the second anniversary of the 25 August 2017 attacks on the Rohingya, a mass memorial service and protest arose in the camps, involving tens of thousands of Rohingya (some estimates say 100,000), catching alarmed Bangladesh national authorities by surprise (though district officials had been aware of the event).

==== Attempted relocation to Bhasan Char island ====
Efforts to reduce the population of the camps—by moving about 100,000 Rohingya to an island—met with equally firm resistance. Group "shelters" and elevated storm shelters, were built by the government on Bhasan Char—a newly emerged silt island in the Bay of Bengal, 37 miles from the mainland (and over 50 miles from the camps) -- but, again, the Rohingya refused relocation from the camps, citing fears of isolation from society and aid, vulnerability to cyclones (the low island was reported to flood annually, particularly being submerged during storms at high tide), absence of forest and farmland needed for subsistence, and effective imprisonment. Their objections have been continually supported by international human rights organizations, officials, and aid organizations, and expert reports on the island and climate.

=== Crackdown and new restrictions ===
Following the refugees' mass boycott of the Bangladeshi government's repatriation and relocation efforts, and mass protests, in 2019, top government officials expressed anger at the organized resistance and protests, accused aid agencies of encouraging them, and vowed to take actions to prevent such resistance in the future.

Among the government's first counter-measures were increases in military presence throughout the camps to preserve law and order (according to the government) -- though refugees claimed that they were harassed by the troops, who were particularly aggressive towards organizers of the Rohingyas' 25 August 2019 mass rally.

In early September 2019, the government banned two aid agencies from the camps—a U.S. agency, Adventist Development and Relief Agency (ADRA), and a local agency, Al Markazul Islami—whom it accused of "instigating" the Rohingya to reject the recent repatriation effort. Foreign Minister AK Momen further warned that the United Nations agencies might be kicked out of the country if they did not support the government's island-relocation plans.

In mid-September 2019, the government began encircling the camps with barbed wire, saying it was to combat "human trafficking"—though later declaring it was to restrict further expansion of the camps.

==== Communications restrictions ====
Also, in September 2019, the government began asking, then instructing, telecommunications companies to restrict telecommunications access in the camps. By forbidding the sale of cell phone SIM cards to Rohingya and reducing cellular telephone service from 4G and 3G levels—down to only 2G levels—internet communications to, from, and within the camps became impractical.

Defending the internet blackout, the government cited "security" concerns, noting criminal activity in the camps—though refugees, and some of their advocates, complained that the blackout made the refugees more vulnerable to criminals and potentially unable to call police as a crime was happening. The restrictions have continued, intermittently, until becoming continuous—over the objections of international human rights and aid organizations.

In 2020, during the COVID-19 pandemic, dozens of human-rights and aid organizations warned that the communications blackout would limit refugees' timely access to reliable medical information, advice and assistance, and increase confusion, misinformation, paranoia, and panic, and aggravate the spread of the virus within the densely populated camps. However, the government refused to lift the ban, continuing to cite "safety" and "security" concerns.

=== April–May 2020 ===
In April and May 2020, several different major events happened in the camps, with a cumulative effect that heightened tensions and created new issues in the camps.

These included:

==== Fires ====
On 12 May 2020, a fire erupted from a gas-cylinder shop in the camp, spreading through hundreds of homes in the camp's largest fire to date. Ten people were injured, 330 homes/shops were destroyed, and 300 were damaged. Such fires had been predicted as likely for such overcrowded refugee camps.

==== COVID-19 pandemic ====
Since the COVID-19 pandemic began spreading globally in early 2020, experts and aid agencies like the World Health Organization (WHO) spokesperson in Bangladesh warned that densely populated refugee camps in and around Cox's Bazar were at risk, especially due to poor sanitation and nutrition predisposing the residents to severe illness. Without high-speed internet to quickly communicate health information or adequate resources to distribute medical care, the camps' five hospitals, with a combined total of 340 beds, were predictably overwhelmed by COVID-19 cases in less than two months, subsequently raising deaths from malaria. Misinformation spread by word of mouth included rumors that the virus was not highly contagious and that health workers were killing infected patients, resulting in patients not seeking treatment until they became severely ill and had already infected others. Officials and medical experts warned that COVID-19 deaths in the camps could reach 2,000 or more, potentially exceeding deaths directly caused by military persecution in Myanmar.

By March 2022, Bangladeshi authorities further restricted movement between the camp and the larger country to reduce transmission, increasing to a complete lockdown throughout Cox's Bazar by the following month, which prevented the entry of 80% of arriving aid workers, such as those returning from travel abroad. These measures were enforced by police and military patrols, leaving the Rohingya refugees with dwindling food supplies, reduced medical assistance, and halted educational/counseling services. COVID-19 first arrived in the camps in May, confirmed through positive tests from two Rohingya refugees and ten Bangladeshis in the surrounding area.

==== Continued internet and cellphone blackout ====
The Bangladesh government continued the internet communications blackout in the camps, despite warnings from aid agencies and human rights organizations that limiting communications to, from, and within the camps would result in dangerously inadequate responses to outbreaks of COVID-19, and to misinformation, paranoia, and panic that could threaten public health. Refugee commissioner Mahbub Alam Talukder asked the government to end the communications blackout in the camps, but the government refused, continuing to allege "safety" and "security" concerns.

==== Cyclone Amphan and monsoon fears ====
In mid-May 2020, Cyclone Amphan developed in the Indian Ocean, and swept up the Bay of Bengal to India and Bangladesh. At its peak, it was the largest cyclone ever recorded in the Bay of Bengal, and its exact point of landfall, and the predicted scope of destruction, was uncertain at first—heightening fears that it could make landfall close to the Rohingya camps, with devastating consequences.

Volunteers, government, and aid agencies shored up fragile hillsides and structures to resist the impact. As the eye of the storm approached the mainland, red warning flags were raised at the main Rohingya camps at Cox's Bazar—escalating storm warnings from level six to level nine, the most severe warning. However, Amphan tracked towards the eastern edge of India and western Bangladesh, over a hundred miles from the camps. Heavy rains and high winds from the outer fringes of the storm did limited damage to the camps.

Despite the relatively mild impact of Cyclone Amphan, climatologists warned that Indian Ocean storms had increased in frequency and severity in recent decades. Future monsoon seasons are therefore expected to increase flooding and landslides within the camps.

==== Bhasan Char relocation revived ====
Though the government continued to urge the relocation of refugees from the camp to the island of Bhasan Char, they faced opposition from global diplomats, human rights, aid organizations, and the Rohingya refugees themselves.

However, in March or April 2020, around 300 Rohingya attempted to flee the mainland camp for Malaysia, by boat, and—after being turned away by Malaysian authorities—became stranded at sea. Though they were rescued by the Bangladesh navy, in early May, the government, rather than return them to the mainland camps from which they had come, instead involuntarily "quarantined" them on Bhashan Char island—ostensibly over the risk that the castaways may have been infected with COVID-19.

The same opponents of the Bhasan Char relocation plan urged that the new detainees be returned to their families at the mainland camps as soon as the usual 3-week quarantine period (for COVID-19) was completed. However, despite pleas from human rights organizations and the U.N. Secretary General, Bangladesh's Foreign Minister later announced that the refugees "probably" would not be returned to the mainland camps, until ready to return to Myanmar.

Concerns among their relatives in the camps, and among Rohingya advocates, escalated when Cyclone Amphan approached Bangladesh because the island—which was much closer to the storm than the mainland camps—was known to be prone to complete flooding in major storms.

However, the center of the cyclone passed at a distance of over 40 miles from the island, so it only dealt a minor blow to the island. While no reporters have been allowed on the island, government reports list no deaths or damage to island facilities. Government authorities seized on this news to declare that Bhasan Char's had proved its stability under harsh weather conditions, renewing their relocation campaign.

=== March 2021 ===
In March 2021, a fire at the refugee camp left at least 15 dead, as well as roughly 400 missing and 560 injured. The fire also displaced a total of more than 45,000 mostly Rohingya refugees.

=== March 2023 ===
In March 2023, a fire at the camp destroyed more than 2,000 shelters and displaced 12,000 refugees.

== Demographics ==
Population breakdown by camp as of 30 April 2020:
Camp name	Population
Kutupalong RC	16,713
Camp 1E	37,945
Camp 1W	38,005
Camp 2E	25,659
Camp 2W	23,587
Camp 3	35,599
Camp 4	29,854
Camp 4 Ext	6,691
Camp 5	24,437
Camp 6	22,726
Camp 7	36,652
Camp 8E	29,244
Camp 8W	30,683
Camp 9	32,846
Camp 10	29,771
Camp 11	29,668
Camp 12	25,662
Camp 13	41,610
Camp 17	16,344
Camp 18	27,023
Camp 19	22,967
Camp 20	6,777
Camp 20 Ext	7,732
Total	598,195

As of 31 December 2024, the total population of Rohingya refugees in Bangladesh was 1,005,520, spread across 204,278 families, for a median family size of five. Of this population, 52% were children, 4% were elderly, 6.22% had at least one special need and 3.03% were disabled. 67% of these refugees came from Maungdaw Township and 26% from Buthidaung Township.

Of this population, the original government-run Kutupalong Registered Rohingya Refugee Camp had a population of 16,807, while its "expansion site", the adjacent makeshift camps, had a population of 669,959, for a total of 686,766 people.

== Administration and operations ==
During the early stages of the refugee influx, in every camp, a Camp-in-Charge (CIC) official from the Bangladesh's Refugee Relief and Repatriation Commission (RRRC) performed the administrative duties, while the Bangladesh government outsourced responsibilities for recruitment and site management to either the office of the United Nations High Commissioner for Refugees (UNHCR), or its affiliate organization, the International Organization for Migration (IOM), who led the humanitarian operations, and established a "service map" to guide what services were provided, to and by whom, and where. To fill gaps between the service maps, the agencies responsible for site management provided "referral services" (granting special permissions for movement of Rohingyas), or provided the necessary services themselves.

Overall coordination of their joint efforts, and those of the various aid and management organizations operating in the camps, were handled by their joint Inter-Sector Coordinating Group (ISCG).

Within the camps, all services for Rohingyas were provided by a mix of local, national and international NGOs (non-governmental organizations), along with Bangladesh's Ministry of Women and Children Affairs (MoWCA), and its Department of Social Services (in the Ministry of Social Welfare). District units of all other concerned ministries were also involved in the operations.

According to ISCG, the camps were divided into 16 different sectors, in which the refugees were provided with 11 types of services, including:

- Site management
- site development
- shelter/NFI
- water/sanitation/hygiene (WASH)
- food security
- health
- education (limited)
- child protection
- protection from gender based violence (GBV)
- communication with community (CwC)

However, in early September 2019 — following Rohingya resistance to the latest repatriation efforts (which the government blamed largely on aid agencies), and with authorities complaining that aid agencies were more sympathetic to the Rohingya than to the Bangladesh government, and were undermining its repatriation and relocation efforts — the government announced it was beginning to take charge of all administration in the Rohingya camps, also transferring control of humanitarian operations to RRRC. However, an RRRC Additional Commissioner said that the change was requested by the UNHCR, due to declining funds.

Rohingya refugees, particularly activists, have complained of being denied any role in the management of their camps, and of not even being listened to by authorities and aid workers. Rohingya language is a barrier, but so are the inherent behaviors of aid organizations, according to a 2019 study by the Peace Research Institute Oslo. Additionally, the relations between the Rohingya and the aid agencies broke further when the Bangladesh government ordered an end to direct cash payments to refugees—many of whom, until then, had supplemented their meager resources with cash jobs as "canteer" aid workers for the aid agencies.

== Living conditions ==
In June 2019, researchers with the International Food Policy Research Institute (IFPRI) released a report, based on an October 2018 survey of 2,100 Rohingya refugees conducted by IFPRI in conjunction with principal aid and development research agencies, reporting that the Rohingya in the camps were "surviving, not thriving."

The researchers found that the refugees' food supply, though "monotonous" (little meat, dairy products, fruit or vegetables), was of above minimal calorie requirements, and was nearly universally accessible—two thirds of refugees receiving a food parcel consisting of rice, lentils, and nutrient-fortified cooking oil; the other third receiving electronic vouchers that could be used to buy 19 different foods.

However, despite improvements in child nutrition, it found that a third of the children were "chronically undernourished" (and a third of those "acutely" so), owing partly to inadequate nutrition during pregnancy, the "monotonous diets", and inadequate "hygiene conditions in the camps."

Attempts by refugees to earn money, to buy more food, were not very successful, partly because working outside the camps was restricted or forbidden for most, particularly those arriving after August 2017, who were mostly declared "Forcibly Displaced Myanmar Nationals" (FDMNs), denied official "refugee" status.

Rohingya FDMNs who had arrived after August 2017 had a monthly per capita income of US$19—and those who arrived earlier, US$22—compared to Bangladeshi households in the surrounding community, which were 46% higher ($29). While the FDMN's had about 10% of their income from working inside or outside the camps (the rest from their own business, or "other sources"). Those who had lived in Bangladesh longer, got 70% of their income from food assistance, 19% from working, and 2% from businesses of their own.

While acknowledging that the release of Rohingya into the local workforce would suppress income for local Bangladeshis (unless additional aid was supplied to their community), the researchers assessed that it would improve the Rohingyas' condition.

However, in December 2019, the government banned cash aid in the camps, to reduce cash-for-work opportunities—eliminating a rare source of potential income, particularly for women refugees, who had particularly little economic opportunity.

In the October 2018 IFPRI survey, children in the camps were not allowed schooling (a situation that authorities have pledged to improve), and no training was available to adults, limiting their future prospects.

The researchers warned that the conditions, if not improved, could turn the camps into sites of "hopelessness, anger or even violence"—a concern echoed by human rights advocates and Rohingya refugees, themselves.
