= Sea Pearl Beach Resort and Spa =

- Interactive map of the Sea Pearl Beach Resort and Spa area
- Former names: Royal Tulip Sea Pearl Beach Resort

General information
- Status: Operational
- Type: Resort
- Architectural style: Spanish
- Location: Marine Drive Road, Ukhia, Cox's Bazar, Bangladesh
- Coordinates: 21.2156495°N 92.048894°E
- Opening: 17 September 2015; 10 years ago
- Owner: Sea Pearl Beach Resort and Spa Limited
- Management: Aminul Haque Shamim

Technical details
- Floor count: 10

Design and construction
- Awards and prizes: The World Luxury Hotel Awards (2022); Bangladesh Travel, Tourism and Hospitality Award (2024)
- Designations: Five-star

Other information
- Number of rooms: 493

Website
- seapearlcoxsbazar.com

Sea Pearl Beach Resort and Spa is a seaside resort located in Ukhia Upazila of Cox’s Bazar District, Bangladesh, near Inani Beach. A private beach is reserved for its guests.

== History ==
Logo before the change of the resort's operating company

In 2010, Aminul Haque Shamim, the owner of Sea Crown Hotel in Cox's Bazar, began constructing a resort near Inani Beach, about 20 km (12 mi) from the city, at a total cost of around ৳600 crore, including a loan of ৳200 crore. In July 2014, a contract was signed between the developer and the Louvre Hotel Group to operate the under-construction resort. On 11 February 2015, at a press briefing, it was announced that the resort would open within three months which was called as "the largest in South Asia". On 17 September 2015, Amir Hossain Amu, the then Minister of Industries, inaugurated the resort in the presence of government officials and personalities. On 29 August 2017, the Bangladesh Securities and Exchange Commission (BSEC) approved the resort to issue bonds, and in the same year, the Investment Corporation of Bangladesh (ICB) purchased its bonds worth ৳325 crore. In 2019, the resort's company was listed on both the Dhaka Stock Exchange (DSE) and the Chittagong Stock Exchange (CSE). In 2020 and 2021, the resort's business suffered due to the COVID-19 pandemic. In 2023, Sea Pearl Sundarbans Eco Resort acquired 40% of the company’s shares. In the same year, the BSEC approved an agreement for investment firm GEM Global Yield LLC SCS to purchase shares worth ৳350 crore of the resort. However, the firm later didn't complete the purchase as per the agreement. According to the financial statements of 2022–2023, the resort earned more revenue from food sales than from room rentals. According to its company secretary, the authorities were practically implementing strategies to increase sales by offering special promotions for foods. In 2024, a major downturn hit the hotel industry across Bangladesh. During that period, the resort incurred losses in July–September compared to profits in the same period of the previous year. This loss trend continued through December of the same year, resulting in a total loss of ৳16 crore. In 2025, the resort was upgraded from "Z" to "B" category on the stock exchanges.

== Features ==
This five-star resort offers a direct view of the sea. The resort is built in Spanish architectural style. It also features a private beach. Located near Himchari, the 6.1 ha (15 acres) resort covers an area of 30 bighas of land. With 493 rooms, it includes five restaurants, three swimming pools, a fitness centre, a 3D video game corner, a lobby juice bar, an open-air stage, and a café. It also has a 930 m^{2} (10,000 sq ft) auditorium, two seminar halls, and a ballroom. The resort offers tennis and badminton courts, a 3D movie theatre, billiards, a gymnasium, and a spa, along with facilities for parasailing, snorkelling, deep-sea fishing, and speedboat rides. Rooms are categorised into Superior, Panoramic Sea View Studio Suite, Royal Family Suite, and Luxury Honeymoon Suite, among others. The resort also includes the first ever constructed water park in Cox's Bazar District, built in 3.6 ha (9 acres) area.

== Controversies ==
In 2019, the resort's company submitted a prospectus to the BSEC, based on which its IPO was approved. According to Jago News, a review of the prospectus revealed several misleading and incorrect pieces of information. According to a report published in 2022, the Louvre Hotel Group terminated its franchise agreement with the resort after customers became dissatisfied with its promised services, although several of the resort's documents continued to use its former name. After being listed on the stock market, its share prices began to rise abnormally in 2022. An investigation by Jugantor revealed that artificial crises, price-sensitive information, and rumors were used to manipulate the share prices. A 2023 investigation report by the DSE revealed that the resort's Managing Director Shamim, along with related individuals, were involved in manipulation. They withheld most of the profits without selling shares during the review period, while placement shareholders repeatedly traded shares among themselves to artificially inflate the price. Individuals holding significant positions in the resort were reportedly associated with the Awami League (AL). A local journalist from Cox’s Bazar claimed that Sheikh Rehana, sister of former Prime Minister Sheikh Hasina, built the resort in the names of AL leaders and named after British politician Tulip Siddiq, Rehana's daughter. However, the resort authorities denied the claim, stating that the rumor spread because the word "Tulip" was part of its former name.

== Awards ==
In 2022, the resort received The World Luxury Hotel Awards in the categories of Best Beachside Luxury Hotel, Best Luxury Spa Award, and Best General Manager Award. In 2024, it won the Bangladesh Travel, Tourism and Hospitality Award in the Best Beach Hotel category.
