= Abdul Gani (Cox's Bazar politician) =

Bangladeshi politician

Haji Abdul Gani
- আব্দুল গণী

Member of 4th Jatiya Sangsad
- In office 3 March 1988 – 6 December 1990
- Preceded by: AH Abdul Gafur Chowdhury
- Succeeded by: Shahjahan Chowdhury
- Constituency: Cox's Bazar-4

Personal details
- Born: 1926; Teknaf, Cox's Bazar, Bengal Presidency
- Died: September 15, 2018 (aged 91–92); Chittagong, Bangladesh
- Political party: Independent

Abdul Gani (Bengali: আব্দুল গণী; 1926–2018) was an independent politician and member of the Bangladesh Parliament for Cox's Bazar-4.

== Early life and family ==
Abdul Gani was born in 1926 to a Bengali family of Muslim Saudagars in Teknaf, Cox's Bazar subdivision, Chittagong district, Bengal Presidency. His father, Ayyub Ali Saudagar, was the inaugural president of the Teknaf Greater Sadar Union Council.

== Career ==
Abdul Gani had served as the chairman of Teknaf Sadar Union since before 1971. He was a sponsor of the freedom fighters during the Bangladesh Liberation War and participated in it. He was elected to the fourth Jatiya Sangsad from Cox's Bazar-4 (Ukhia-Teknaf) as an independent candidate following the 1988 Bangladeshi general election.

== Death ==
Abdul Gani died on 15 September 2018 in Chittagong Metropolitan Hospital, leaving behind 8 sons, 2 daughters and numerous grandchildren.
