= Cox's Bazar-4 =

Constituency of Bangladesh's Jatiya Sangsad

Coordinates: 20.87°N 92.30°E

- Constituency for the Jatiya Sangsad
- District: Cox's Bazar District
- Division: Chittagong Division
- Electorate: 371,879 (2026)

Current constituency
- Created: 1984
- Party: Bangladesh Nationalist Party
- Member: Shahjahan Chowdhury
- ← 296 Cox's Bazar-3 298 Khagrachari →

Cox's Bazar-4 is a constituency represented in the Jatiya Sangsad (National Parliament) of Bangladesh since 2026 by Shahjahan Chowdhury of the Bangladesh Nationalist Party.

== Boundaries ==
The constituency encompasses Teknaf and Ukhia upazilas.

== History ==
The constituency was created in 1984 from the Chittagong-18 constituency when the former Chittagong District was split into two districts: Chittagong and Cox's Bazar.

== Members of Parliament ==
Election	Member	Party
1979	Shahjahan Chowdhury	Bangladesh Nationalist Party
1986	AHA Gafur Chowdhury	Jatiya Party
1988	Abdul Gani	Independent
1991	Shahjahan Chowdhury	Bangladesh Nationalist Party
Jun 1996	Mohammad Ali	Awami League
2001	Shahjahan Chowdhury	Bangladesh Nationalist Party
2008	Abdur Rahman Bodi	Awami League
2014	Abdur Rahman Bodi	Awami League
2018	Shahin Akhtar	Awami League
2024	Shahin Akhtar	Awami League
2026	Shahjahan Chowdhury	Bangladesh Nationalist Party

== Elections ==
=== Elections in the 2020s ===
General Election 2026: Cox's Bazar-4
Party	Candidate	Votes	%	±%
BNP	Shahjahan Chowdhury			
Jamaat	Noor Ahmed Anwari			
Majority				
Turnout				
Registered electors		375,688		
BNP gain from AL				

=== Elections in the 2010s ===
General Election 2014: Cox's Bazar-4
Party	Candidate	Votes	%	±%
AL	Abdur Rahman Bodi	105,489	93.6	+37.2
JP(E)	Taha Yahiya	7,233	6.4	N/A
Majority		98,256	87.2	+74.0
Turnout		112,722	48.3	−40.1
AL hold				

=== Elections in the 2000s ===
General Election 2008: Cox's Bazar-4
Party	Candidate	Votes	%	±%
AL	Abdur Rahman Bodi	103,626	56.4	+21.2
BNP	Shahjahan Chowdhury	79,310	43.2	−21.6
Independent	Shahin Aktar	676	0.4	N/A
Majority		24,316	13.2	−16.4
Turnout		183,612	88.4	+15.2
AL gain from BNP				

General Election 2001: Cox's Bazar-4
Party	Candidate	Votes	%	±%
BNP	Shahjahan Chowdhury	89,747	64.8	+34.5
AL	Mohammad Ali	48,735	35.2	−9.1
Majority		41,012	29.6	+15.6
Turnout		138,482	73.2	+4.0
BNP gain from AL				

=== Elections in the 1990s ===
General Election June 1996: Cox's Bazar-4
Party	Candidate	Votes	%	±%
AL	Mohammad Ali	44,706	44.3	+0.4
BNP	Shahjahan Chowdhury	30,594	30.3	−18.4
Jamaat	Shah Jalal Chowdhury	17,607	17.4	+16.9
IOJ	Shah Abul Monzur	8,048	8.0	N/A
Majority		14,112	14.0	+9.1
Turnout		100,955	69.2	+16.2
AL gain from BNP				

General Election 1991: Cox's Bazar-4
Party	Candidate	Votes	%	±%
BNP	Shahjahan Chowdhury	36,872	48.7	
AL	Mohammad Ali	33,176	43.9	
Independent	H. Abdul Gani	4,130	5.5	
JP(E)	Abul Fazal Chowdhury	919	1.2	
Jamaat	Shah Jalal Chowdhury	397	0.5	
Independent	Muhammadul Haque Chowdhury	148	0.2	
Majority		3,696	4.9	
Turnout		75,642	53.0	
BNP gain from				
