= Rohingya refugees in Bangladesh =

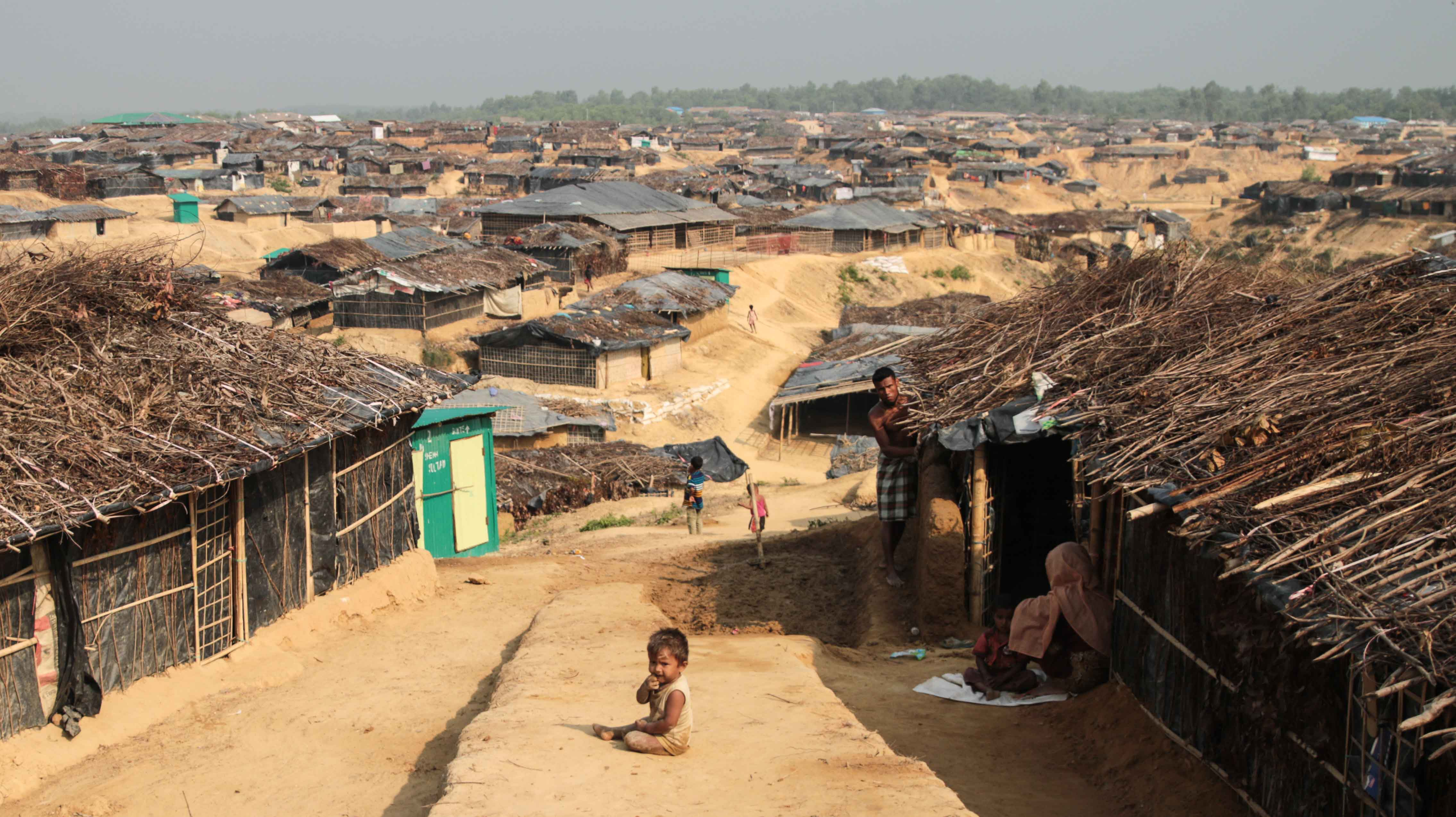
Kutupalong Refugee Camp in Cox's Bazar, Bangladesh.

Rohingya refugees in Bangladesh are forcibly displaced Myanmar nationals from Rakhine State who are living in Bangladesh. The Rohingya people have experienced ethnic and religious persecution in Myanmar for decades. Hundreds of thousands have fled to other countries in Southeast Asia, including Malaysia, Indonesia, and the Philippines. The majority have sought refuge in Bangladesh. In Bangladesh, two officially registered refugee camps are located in the sub-districts of Ukhiya and Teknaf in Cox's Bazar District. Violence in Myanmar has escalated in recent years, so the number of Rohingya refugees in Bangladesh has increased rapidly. According to the UN Refugee Agency (UNHCR), more than 723,000 Rohingya have fled to Bangladesh since 25 August 2017.

A varicella outbreak was recorded in the refugee camp in December 2018, which spread rapidly among the inhabitants of the camp resulting in a total of 82,297 cases.

On 28 September 2018, at the 73rd United Nations General Assembly (UNGA), Bangladeshi Prime Minister Sheikh Hasina said there were 1.1 million Rohingya refugees in Bangladesh by that time. Overcrowding from the recent population boom at Bangladesh's Rohingya refugee camps has placed a strain on their infrastructure. The refugees lack access to services, education, food, clean water, and proper sanitation; they are also vulnerable to natural disasters and infectious disease transmission. As of June 2018, World Bank announced nearly half a billion dollars in monetary support to help Bangladesh address Rohingya refugees' needs in areas including health, education, water and sanitation, disaster risk management, and social protection. An August 2018 study estimated that more than 24,000 Rohingya had been killed by the Myanmar military and local Buddhists militia since the "clearance operations" started on 25 August 2017. It also estimated that at least 18,000 Rohingya Muslim women and girls were raped, 116,000 Rohingya were beaten, and 36,000 Rohingya were thrown into fires set alight in an act of deliberate arson.

== History ==
Rohingyas are a Muslim minority in Myanmar regarded by many Myanmar Buddhists as illegal migrants from Bangladesh, a controversial claim without strong evidence. The Rohingyas have lived in Myanmar for generations and the Bangladesh government has called on Myanmar to take them back. They are denied citizenship in Myanmar and have been described as the world's most persecuted minority. Myanmar has denied persecuting the Rohingyas.

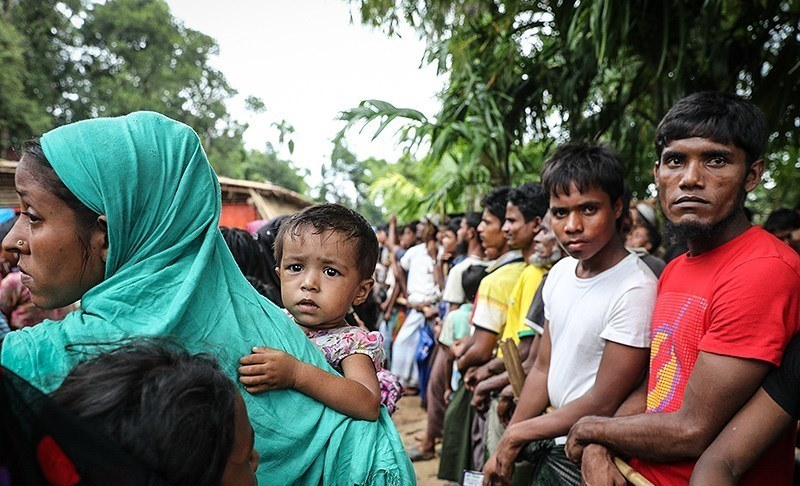
Rohingya refugees in Bangladesh in October 2017

The history of the Rohingya people can be broadly categorized into three distinct periods: precolonial, colonial, and postcolonial. In the precolonial era, the independent kingdom of Arakan (now Rakhine State) hosted diverse populations, including Muslim Arab sailors who arrived between 788 and 810 CE, and Bengali settlers who arrived between the 15th and 17th centuries. During this period, Rohingyas and Arakanese Buddhists coexisted peacefully, sharing cultural and economic exchanges. The First Anglo-Burmese War inaugurated British rule in Burma and the new colonial authorities encouraged mass immigration from Bengal to Arakan, which blurred pre-existing settlement lines and fueled local resentment. The division between these communities deepened further during World War II, when the Rohingyas allied with the British, while the Arakanese Buddhists sided with the Japanese. This allegiance shift had dire consequences for the Rohingya, who became targets of mass violence during the Japanese occupation of Burma, with an estimated 100,000 killed and 50,000 forced into exile in East Bengal.

Following Burma's independence in 1948, discrimination against the Rohingya intensified, with their rights and citizenship increasingly restricted. Between 1940 and 1947, Buddhist nationalist extremism gained momentum, further marginalizing the Rohingya population. The situation escalated in 1978, when the Burmese military junta launched a large-scale operation to expel those deemed "illegal inhabitants," resulting in widespread harassment, violence, and arbitrary arrests. This led to the mass exodus of approximately 250,000 Rohingyas to Bangladesh. In response to international pressure, a repatriation agreement was reached between Burma and Bangladesh the following year, forcing most Rohingyas to return to Burma. However, just three years later, the 1982 Citizenship Law was enacted, formally revoking Rohingya citizenship and rendering an estimated 800,000 people stateless in northern Rakhine State. Despite undeniable historical evidence of Rohingya presence in Burma for centuries, the Burmese government has continued to deny their identity, refusing to recognize them as an official ethnic group. Instead, they are labeled "Bengali" illegal immigrants, perpetuating their exclusion, statelessness, and vulnerability to ongoing persecution.

Since the 1970s, Rohingya refugees have been coming to Bangladesh from Myanmar. In the early 2000s, all but 20,000 of them were repatriated to Myanmar, some against their will. This respite ended in 2015 and by 2017, an estimated 300,000 to 500,000 Rohingya refugees were in Bangladesh. Most of the refugees are located along the Teknaf-Cox's Bazar highway that is parallel to the Naf River, which is the border between Bangladesh and Myanmar. Most of the refugees are located in or near Cox's Bazar, a coastal area dependent upon tourism.

Bangladesh blamed the refugees for crime and 2012 Ramu violence in Cox's Bazar. Bangladesh also follows a policy of making the country unwelcoming for Rohingya refugees. The majority of the refugees are unregistered, with only 32 thousand refugees registering themselves with UNHCR and the Bangladeshi government. An estimated 200,000+ refugees are living unregistered in Bangladesh. Amnesty International (AI) reports have stated that the Myanmar security forces are committing rape, extrajudicial killing, and burning homes belonging to the Rohingya in a December 2016 report. Refugees have been displacing the indigenous people of the Chittagong Hill Tracts. They have also been blamed for importing the narcotic drug Ya ba.

The Prime Minister of Bangladesh, Sheikh Hasina, declared that 35,000 Rohingya were transferred to Bhasan Char to "keep Rohingya youth away from criminal activities." She also emphasized the difficulty of repatriating Rohingya back to Myanmar due to the civil war, and preventing foreign armed groups from using Bangladesh as a guerrilla sanctuary.

== Relocation ==
In 2015, the government of Bangladesh proposed a relocation plan for the Rohingya refugees in Bangladesh to the remote island of Bhasan Char in the Bay of Bengal. The plan was pushed back following criticism by human rights activists and the UNHCR.

Between October and November 2016, about 65,000 Rohingya refugees arrived from Myanmar. The government of Bangladesh decided to revive the relocation plan. Bhasan Char submerges during high tide and was formed in the 2000s by sediments from the Meghna River. It is eight kilometers from Hatiya Island.

The Bangladesh Navy has been tasked with making the island habitable for the refugees. In 2019, the government announced an expansion of the Ashrayan Project (Ashrayan-3) to build 100,000 homes. In January 2020, the project was moving forward despite opposition from Rohingya leaders and human rights groups. Bangladesh's minister for refugee affairs has said the island is "ready for habitation," though he gave no timetable for the relocation. The government has not permitted foreign journalists or Rohingya leaders to travel to Bhasan Char.

Despite persistent concerns and criticism expressed by international human rights organizations, the Bangladeshi government has relocated nearly 20,000 Rohingya refugees to Bhasan Char since December 2020. The government says the relocation is needed because the mainland refugee camps are getting too crowded, and that only refugees who volunteer are being moved.

In 2023, a growing number of Rohingya refugees fled the overcrowded camps of Cox's Bazar on Bangladesh's southeast coast and traveled in flimsy boats 1,800 kilometers (1,120 miles) south to Indonesia due to deplorable living conditions in the overcrowded camp, including food scarcity and lack of education, and work opportunities. In an effort to stop the landing of refugee boats, in May 2024, Indonesian police and fisherman started patrolling sections of Aceh province, located on Sumatra's northwest point. In November 2023, more than 1,000 Rohingya arrived — the highest number since 2015.

== Repatriation ==
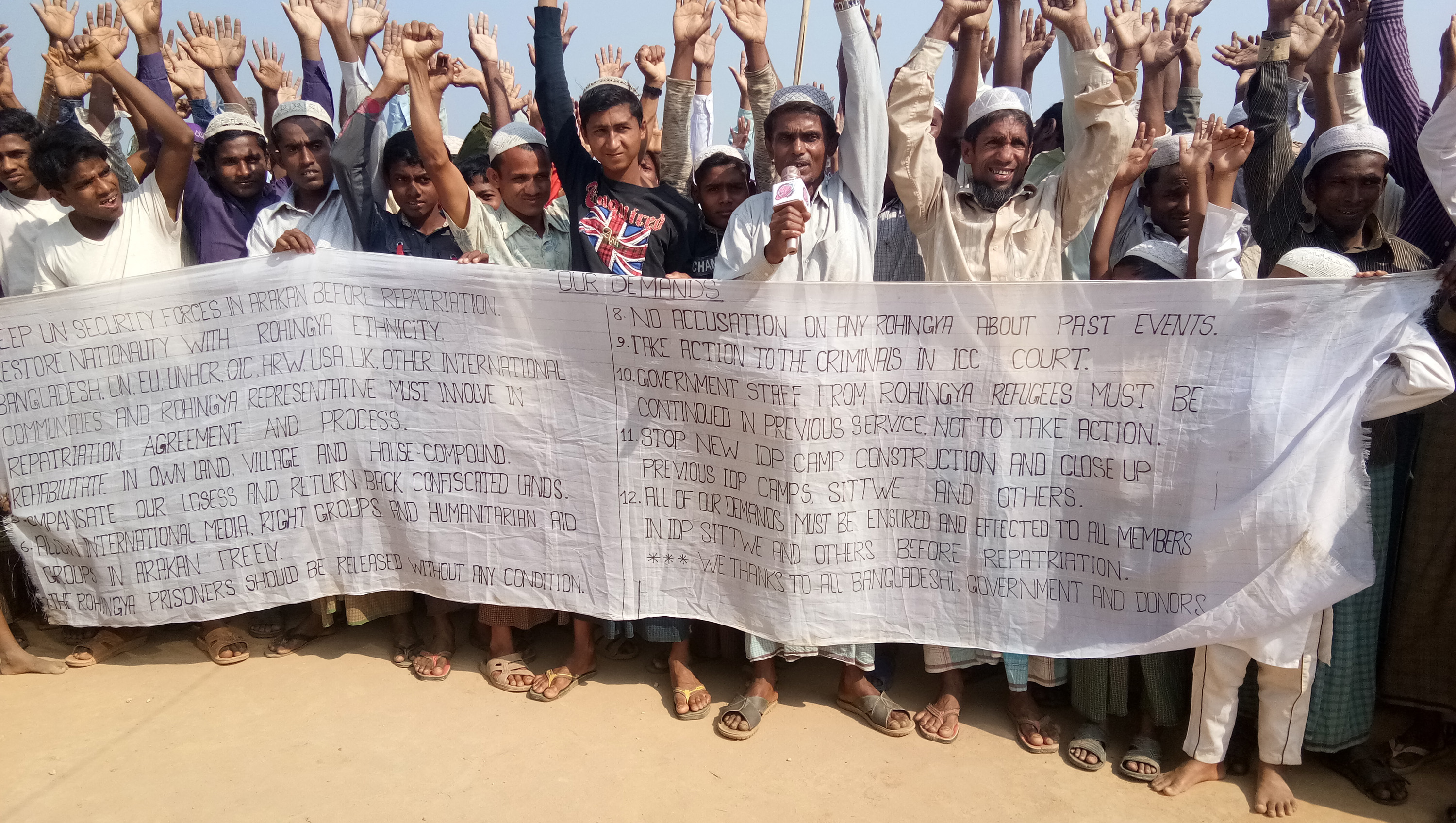
Rohingya refugees in Cox's Bazar, Bangladesh, protesting against what they view as a dangerous repatriation to Myanmar.

After the ARSA attacks on 25 August 2017 and subsequent humanitarian crisis, Bangladeshi Foreign Minister Abul Hassan Mahmud Ali met with Myanmar officials on 2 October 2017, later stating after their meeting that both countries had agreed on a "joint working group" for the repatriation of Rohingya refugees who had fled to Bangladesh.

The governments of Myanmar and Bangladesh signed a memorandum of understanding on 23 November 2017 regarding the repatriation of Rohingya refugees to Rakhine State. Bangladesh's Foreign Minister stated that a joint working group composed of UNHCR and members of both nations was to be established within three weeks to fix the final terms for the beginning of the process. He also stated that those returning would be kept in temporary camps near their abandoned homes. Under the deal, Myanmar would ensure that they are not kept in the camps for long and are issued identity cards. The foreign secretaries of both nations met on 19 December to finalise the agreement. Bangladesh's foreign ministry issued a statement saying that the group would "ensure commencement of repatriation within two months" by developing a timetable for verification of identities and logistics.

Bangladesh's foreign ministry announced on 15 January 2018 that their government and Myanmar's had bilaterally agreed on a repatriation deal for Rohingya refugees in Bangladesh, which would aim to complete the process of repatriation within two years. Win Myat Aye, Myanmar's Minister for Social Welfare, Relief and Resettlement, also announced that his country would begin repatriating Rohingya refugees beginning on 23 January 2018. Originally, the government of Myanmar agreed to repatriate only 374 Rohingya refugees out of a list of over 8,000 submitted by their Bangladeshi counterparts on 14 March 2018, citing incomplete paperwork as the reason for the slow process, but on 18 May 2018, they announced they would repatriate a total of 1,100 "verified" Rohingyas from the list.

On 6 June 2018, the United Nations and the government of Myanmar signed a memorandum of understanding regarding the repatriation of Rohingya refugees, the details of which were kept secret until they were leaked online on 29 June 2018. The agreement was immediately criticised and rejected by Rohingya leaders, who say it does not address the concerns of their community.

Following the 2025 BIMSTEC meeting, Myanmar has agreed to take back 180,000 Rohingyas in the first phase under Mohammad Yunus. Khalilur Rahman stated that the verification process is underway for an additional 70,000 Rohingyas to be repatriated. However, the repatriation plan failed as Myanmar lost control of border areas since the Battle of Maungdaw. Bangladesh's Foreign Adviser Touhid Hossain noted that talks with the Arakan Army are not possible as it is a non-state actor. Meanwhile, more 120,000 Rohingya have fled Rakhine and taken refuge in Bangladesh.

On 27 April 2025, Bangladesh's Jamaat-e-Islami proposed a Rohingya-majority state independent from Myanmar as a solution to "ensure their repatriation and rehabilitation" during a meeting with Chinese Communist Party officials. Jamaat officials claimed that they were emphasizing a need for a safe zone in Rohingya-majority areas in Rakhine State.

Jonathan Shrier, Acting U.S. Representative to the UN Economic and Social Council, stated that the Arakan Army's participation in repatriation negotiations is critical for long-term solutions.

Some Rohingya return on their own to northern Rakhine State in spite of Arakan Army control due to lack of opportunities in the refugee camps.

On 25 August 2025, the eighth anniversary of the Rohingya refugee crisis, tens of thousands of refugees held rallies across camps in Cox's Bazar, Bangladesh, displaying banners with slogans such as "No more refugee life," "Stop Genocide," and "Repatriation the ultimate solution." The events reflected ongoing frustration among the refugee population, which had grown to over 1.3 million. Chief Adviser Muhammad Yunus stated that Bangladesh could no longer allocate additional domestic resources to support the refugees and called upon the 'international community' to draft a roadmap for repatriation. Living conditions in the camps remained difficult, with overcrowded shelters, reduced aid, closed educational facilities, and limited prospects for return. Speaking at a related conference, Rohingya community leader Sayed Ullah stated that the situation had remained unchanged despite years of international dialogue, noting the community's continued lack of rights, opportunities, and guarantees of safe repatriation.

== Health issues ==
Since the rapid influx of Rohingya refugees into Bangladesh began in 2017, public health officials have been concerned that myriad health issues among the refugees would arise. As predicted, mental health has deteriorated, food and water-borne diseases are spreading, infectious diseases are emerging, malnutrition is prevalent, and reproductive health for women and girls must be addressed.

The major health problems prevailing among Rohingya refugees are unexplained fever, acute respiratory infections, and diarrhea. Rohingya camps also experienced a sudden outbreak of diphtheria in November 2017 and a measles outbreak in December 2017 – April 2018. Mental health problems such as post-traumatic stress disorder (PTSD), depression, and suicidal thoughts were also prevalent in the Rohingya community. More than half of the Rohingya refugees are women, and many of them do not have access to quality antenatal care while pregnant.

=== Mental health ===
In humanitarian crises, mental health responses typically follow the IASC pyramid of Mental Health and Psychosocial Services (MHPSS). Ideally, different levels of care are to be provided to best serve communities, as well as individuals. The philosophy behind this model maintains that individual psychological treatment and broad social interventions are both essential to overall mental wellbeing and resilience. It also acknowledges that most of a population requires minimal psychosocial interventions to improve or prevent adverse mental health outcomes, which can be facilitated by mental health workers. But those who experience impaired functioning due to severe emotional distress or who require pharmaceutical treatment for an existing or developing condition would require more specialized services facilitated my more highly trained professionals, such as psychiatrists and psychologists.

The Rohingya refugees settled in the Cox's Bazar region of Bangladesh are at risk for mental health issues due to a wide variety of factors, including prior history of systematic dehumanization, persecution, having witnessed or experienced traumatic events, and daily stressors of remaining in a refugee settlement. The history of the Rohingya located in the Rakhine State of Myanmar includes protracted social and economic exclusion, which ultimately escalated to extreme violence resulting in a mass exodus of up to an estimated 900,000 refugees to date. The traumatic events that have occurred in Rakhine State included burning of villages, arrests, torture, sexual assault, and loss of family and livelihoods.

Major agencies involved with mental health response for the Rohingya in Bangladesh include: The Bangladesh government (Ministry of Health and Ministry of Women and Children), UN agencies (IOM, UNHCR, UNICEF), International NGOs (Terre des hommes, ACF, Danish Refugee Council, Handicap International, International Rescue Committee, MSF, Relief International, Save the Children, World Concern), National NGOs (BRAC, Gonoshasthaya Kendra, Mukiti), and Red Cross Societies (Danish Red Cross, International Federation of the Red Cross, and Red Crescent Societies). Mental health workers and some specialists have been deployed, but mental health service delivery continues to be problematic and there is a recognized gap in services. Efforts since the beginning of the crisis have focused on providing basic psychosocial training and non-specialized community interventions, including training in Psychological First Aid. Integrating MHPSS interventions and awareness in primary healthcare services has also been problematic, as providing adequate access to basic health services itself has been a challenge in the refugee camps due to a shortage in supplies, space, and staff. This integration continues to be a goal, and efforts towards program implementation and training of healthcare professionals in the field have been an area of focus. However, the increases in the camp population, especially during the rapid population influx of an estimated 700,000 in 2017, only exacerbated these challenges. Furthermore, the resource-poor humanitarian efforts are suggested to increase negative psychological impacts by perpetuating anxiety, stress and depression and decreasing capacity for resilience.

According to a report published by the United Nations Higher Commissioner for Refugees (UNHCR), there have been few studies published on mental health concerns of the Rohingya refugee populations. Nonetheless, there are a concerning number of cases reported involving "explosive anger, psychotic-like symptoms, somatic or medically unexplained symptoms, impaired function and suicidal ideation," along with a documented history of reported high anxiety, hypervigilance, depression, and appetite loss within the population. Relatedly, screening 958 refugees in Kutupalong camp in 2022 for mental health issues resulted in a referral rate of 20.46%. The referral rate was unevenly distributed between women (17.56%) and men (30.27%). Both groups commonly reported stressors such as cramped living conditions, idleness, breakup of extended families and uncertainty about the future, but women were more often subject to being housebound and domestic violence, and men more often reported issues related to a lack of earning opportunities and joblessness. Factors causing these mental health concerns appear to involve not only daily stressors of refugee living situations and the trauma endured before arrival, but also protracted traumatic or stressful experience being persecuted in Rakhine State.

The combination of the protracted refugee crisis with a history of stress, persecution and trauma is a cause for concern with the Rohingya and further investigation into the effects and treatments has been recommended. Furthermore, there have been obstacles with reporting mental health measurement results, including not having validated such measurements with the Rohingya before research and a substandard understanding of cultural idioms of distress. This allows for possible misinterpretation of mental health concerns. Multiple involved agencies have recommended further evaluation into cultural idioms of distress, the validity of results and continued research.

=== Food and Water-borne diseases ===
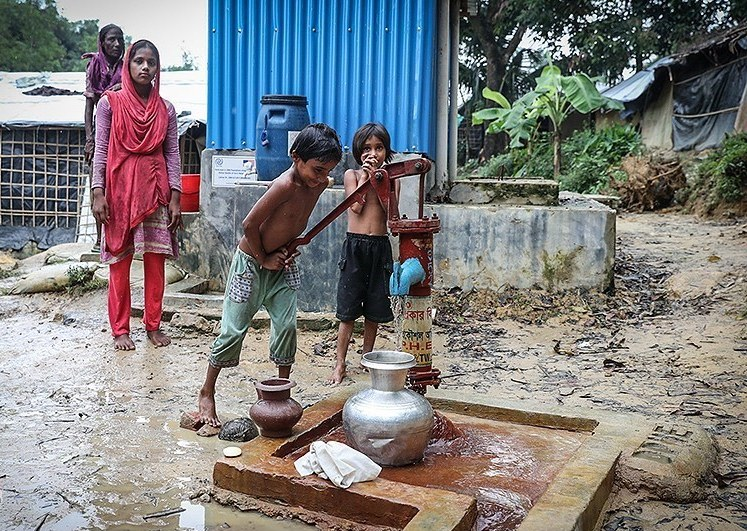
Clean water and sanitation are scarce for many Rohingya refugees in Bangladesh, especially in unregistered camps.

Poor infrastructure and sanitation in refugee camps place the Rohingya at increased risk for food- and water-borne diseases. The recommended number of residents per latrine to reduce risk for waterborne disease is 20, according to the Minimum Standards in Humanitarian response. In the Rohingya refugee camps in Bangladesh, the actual prevalence of latrines is one latrine for 37 individuals. Clean water is also in demand for the Rohingya refugees. Many people draw from nearby rivers for drinking water, but these rivers are also sources of bathing and open defecation, especially in unofficial Rohingya camps. Contamination of these rivers and latrines by harmful pathogens becomes an even greater risk during monsoon seasons for Rohingya camps in both Myanmar and Bangladesh. Poor infrastructure in the refugee camps will not protect against flooding events that can easily spread food- and water-borne pathogens.

The inadequate sanitation and hygiene conditions in the Rohingya camps have resulted in increased risk for transmission of diarrheal infections. Escherichia coli, for example, has been detected in 92% of water samples taken from a Rohingya refugee camp. Other water- and food-borne diseases that pose a threat to the Rohingya refugees are cholera, hepatitis A, hepatitis E, and typhoid. Currently, diarrheal diseases contribute significantly to health morbidity in the Rohingya camps. Approximately 8% of morbidity among Rohingya refugees is attributable to acute watery diarrhea (AWD), and the prevalence of AWD among individuals who seek clinical care is 22%. According to the UNHCR, 63,750 Rohingya refugees suffering from AWD visited a registered camp's clinic between 25 August and 2 December 2017. There were also 15 reported deaths due to AWD during that time.

The threat of food- and water-borne diseases is especially concerning among vulnerable populations, including children and pregnant women. In official camps, 40% of children less than 5-years-old, have been infected with a diarrheal disease. The prevalence of diarrheal symptoms within the past 30 days among children living in unofficial camps, where adequate latrines are rare, is greater than 50%. Pregnancy often complicates a woman's ability to combat infection. Mortality rates for hepatitis E, for example, are as low as 1% among the general population but can increase drastically to 20–25% for pregnant women.

=== Infectious diseases among Rohingya refugees ===
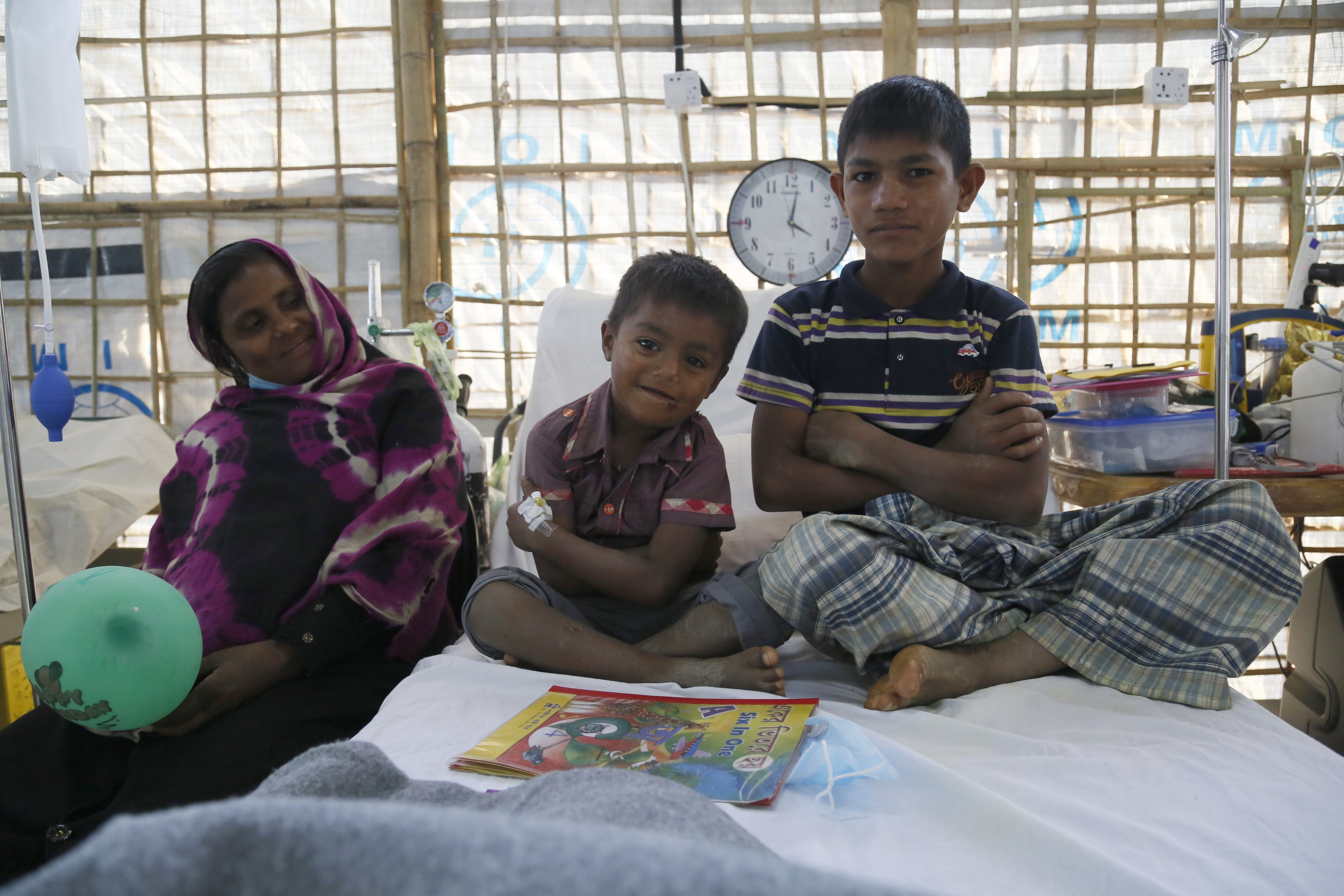
4-year-old Anowar pictured with his mum and brother after being treated for diphtheria by the UK's Emergency Medical Team in Kutupalong, Bangladesh

Due to poor sanitation, low water quality, close living quarters, and high levels of drug trafficking and sexual violence, infectious disease outbreaks in Rohingya refugee camps are of concern to public health officials. High rates of respiratory infections and diarrheal illnesses have already been documented and children seem to recover more poorly from infectious diseases than adults due to malnutrition, but all ages are struggling to recover from respiratory infections and diarrheal diseases.

Currently, diphtheria resurgence is a large concern. As of February 2018, there have been 5,710 reported cases and 35 reported deaths due to diphtheria. Mass vaccination efforts to stop the spread of diphtheria have been difficult due to cultural barriers and the hesitation of the Rohingya. However, steps are being taken by public health officials to understand these barriers and to improve the Rohingya's understanding of vaccination in hopes of increasing the vaccination rate and preventing new cases of diphtheria.

Another concern of public health officials is the potential increase of sexually transmitted infections. Drug trafficking and sexual violence are high among the Rohingya refugees residing in the Cox's Bazar district in Bangladesh, and there are 83 known cases of HIV among refugees, with many more unknown cases likely.

While not yet seen in the refugee camps, hepatitis E is a concern, particularly for pregnant women, as the death rate increases from 1% to as much as 25% when infection occurs in the third trimester. There have been cases of acute jaundice syndrome, which is associated with hepatitis E infection.

=== Vaccination status and disease prevention ===
Starting in October 2017, Rohingya refugees migrated in droves into Bangladesh, and since then, a massive spread of communicable diseases has occurred among them. Rohingya refugees are often not vaccinated, and there is worry that outbreaks of vaccine-preventable diseases, such as polio, measles, and tetanus, will occur if living conditions are not improved. But the UN and the WHO, along with the Bangladesh Government, were quick to begin mass vaccination of the population. A measles outbreak is a dangerous threat, and in 2017, the WHO announced that 136,000 children under 15 years of age were vaccinated against measles and rubella. An oral polio vaccine was also given to 72,000 children. Permanent vaccination centers are in place to assist in the vaccination effort of children under the age of 2 years. In October 2017, a mass vaccination effort spearheaded by the Ministry of Health and Family Welfare and partners provided 900,000 doses of oral cholera vaccine in two phases. More than 700,000 people over 1 year of age received a single dose during the first phase; in the second, an additional dose of the oral cholera vaccine was administered to 199,472 children ages 1 to 5 years. In addition, 236,696 children under 5 years of age were also vaccinated against polio. No new cases of cholera were detected in the 3 months following mass vaccination. But Rohingya refugees arriving after the mass vaccination remain unprotected. As a result, a new cholera vaccination campaign began in May 2018. Also in Cox's Bazar, Rohingya children up to age 6 were immunized in December 2017 against pneumococcal disease, pertussis, tetanus, influenza B, and diphtheria in an effort to prevent future outbreaks and to control the spread of diphtheria.

=== Malnutrition ===
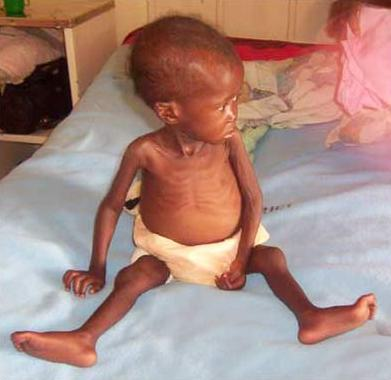
Malnutrition is a serious public health concern for Rohingya refugee children.

Malnutrition is a serious public health concern for Rohingya refugee children. According to the World Health Organization (WHO), malnutrition refers to deficiencies and excesses or imbalances in a person's intake of energy and/or nutrients and is a strong predictor of mortality in children who are 5 years and younger. In the refugee camps in Bangladesh, over 25% of Rohingya children are malnourished and over 12% are suffering from severe stunting, a condition resulting from starvation and malnutrition. Infants under 6 months are among the most vulnerable and have malnutrition rates near 50%. This is in part due to mothers' lack of ability to provide breast milk due to their own lack of nutrition. Refugees are dependent on humanitarian aid, and while efforts to combat malnutrition are underway, there is still an alarming rate of malnutrition. Efforts in Bangladesh and other surrounding countries by UNICEF, Action Against Hunger, and other aid relief organizations are helping to provide food and water. Rohingya refugee children are facing a high risk of death, considering the WHO refers to malnutrition as a critical issue when rates reach 15%. Acute malnutrition in the refugees exceeds levels between 24.5% and 26.5%. Malnutrition is well above emergency levels. Of the thousands of children who have fled to Bangladesh, chronic malnutrition is prevalent in around 60% of Rohingya children in Bangladesh.

Many factors play a role in the alarming rates of malnutrition among Rohingya refugee children, including food security, infectious disease, poor sanitary conditions, and contaminated water. Food security is a specific concern since only 6% of refugees report having acceptable food consumption scores. There are still refugees arriving at Cox's Bazar from Myanmar, creating an even greater lack of already very limited resources. A major upcoming concern for the refugees is the potential threat of the rainy season. This has the potential to cause flooding, leading to contaminated water and infectious disease, thus resulting in higher rates of malnutrition. They require huge amounts of nutrient-rich foods to reduce the risk of malnutrition rates increasing.

=== Reproductive health ===
The Rohingya refugee crisis has made Rohingya women more vulnerable. Currently, Rohingya women make up approximately 67% of the refugee population and are victims of sexual violence and exploitation. Of the 335,670 female refugees in the population, 70,000 (20%) are estimated to be pregnant or new mothers. This pregnancy rate is much higher than that of their native Myanmar, where only 4.7% of women are pregnant or new mothers. Many experts believe that the increase in pregnancy rate is a result of sexual violence against displaced Rohingya women. The Bangladesh home ministry states that a staggering 90% of female refugees have been victims of rape. Many victims of rape at the hands of soldiers are killed because of their race. Gender inequalities and marginalization of women are additional reasons for the high rates of violence against women.

Child marriage is a common practice among the Rohingya. There is also a lack of legal procedures for marriage in the camps that refugees are placed in. Very often, marriages are based on dowries, and arranged marriages tend to happen early for girls within the camps, due to fear of sexual violence. When women are married, they are told that they should have a large family, as it is a sin for a woman to limit the number of children she bears. Contraception methods are very limited, and many believe it may lead to infertility or death; family planning is also seen as immoral. Although there are reproductive health services within the camps, not many people seek reproductive care due to a lack of trust in medical personnel and practices, as well as barriers to transportation. Women also tend to be less independently mobile within their communities compared to men. Women and girls usually receive information on sexual and reproductive health through elderly women within the population, and although this can be helpful, very often false information is given to people about reproductive health. Having limited participation with the clinics has led to increases in unsafe pregnancies and sexually transmitted infections.

Most of the Rohingya refugees deliver infants with the help of midwives. The United Nations Population Fund (UNFPA) has been responsible for ensuring that the midwifery diploma program is in the refugee camps. An increase in violence among refugees has been documented, and as a result, the midwives are sometimes unable to provide the proper access to healthcare and resources. Many of the midwives in the region also can not give the best sexual health resources because of language barriers and cultural differences. Due to the Rohingya's conservative values, sexual and reproductive health information and care is limited, and midwives are limited in the information they can provide. The majority of expectant women tend to be between the ages of 15 and 18 years old. Currently, there are approximately 19 facilities within the refugee camps that help give access to reproductive healthcare; however, there is a growing need for services and support for reproductive health issues.

Another factor contributing to the health of Rohingya women is the ability to breastfeed infants and the availability of spaces to do so. As of 2017, about 8.3% of the Rohingya population was breastfeeding. On average, Rohingya women will give birth to 3.8 children in their lifespan and will breastfeed for a total of 6.9 years. A large increase in childbearing has been seen, and breastfeeding-safe regions have become very limited and overcrowded for women as a result. As well as having limited space to participate in breastfeeding, many mothers are not given accurate information on proper feeding practices.

A 2023 qualitative study of Rohingya refugees in camps in Cox's Bazar found that high fertility is driven by a combination of religio-political, social, and practical motives. Many participants described children as blessings from Allah and framed large families as a religious duty, often expressed as a means of "increasing the Muslim community." Fertility was also linked to long-term political aspirations, with several interviewees characterizing childbearing as a way to strengthen the community against persecution and to raise future "Muslim soldiers" who could retake land in Myanmar.

In Rohingya camps of Cox's Bazar and Bhasan Char, it is reported that an average of 100 children are being born every day.

== Violence against women in refugee camps ==
Rohingya women in refugee camps face widespread human rights violations, including child and forced marriages, rising polygamy, and gender-based violence. Displacement has fueled practices where men, often much older, marry multiple wives across camps to gain additional humanitarian aid, leaving women with little autonomy or choice. Unmarried girls are especially vulnerable to harassment and abuse, leading families to marry them off at puberty for perceived protection. Domestic violence is common, particularly in polygamous households, while aid exploitation and unregistered marriages make accountability difficult.

Following a significant reduction in U.S. foreign aid in 2025 under the Trump administration, the humanitarian response for Rohingya refugees in Bangladesh faced a severe funding crisis. UNICEF reported a 27% loss in its budget, leading to the closure of roughly 2,800 schools in June 2025. Human rights organizations documented that these closures removed vital child protection layers, contributing to a 21% increase in verified child marriage cases—defined by the U.N. as marriages involving children under 18—between September 2024 and September 2025.

== Education ==
Bangladesh's government has prohibited Rohingyas from being formally educated outside their camps. The policy also applies to those born and raised in Bangladesh (they are not issued birth certificates). Some refugees have concealed their identity to access formal education. Many such students have been expelled after government notices.

In 2019, Rahima Akter, a registered Rohingya refugee born in Bangladesh, was expelled from Cox's Bazar International University, where she was studying law, because refugees were not allowed to attend educational institutions.

As of 2020, approximately one-third of refugee Rohingya children were able to access primary education, primarily through temporary centers run by international organizations. UNICEF runs approximately 1,600 learning centers across the country, educating around 145,000 children. In April 2020, UNICEF and the Bangladeshi government launched a pilot program aiming to enroll 10,000 Rohingya children in schools where they will be taught the Myanmar school curriculum up to the ninth grade.

While UNICEF schools provide education to children from age 4 to 14, older students rely on private schools or religious schools where the instructors have little education themselves.

The government does not allow Rohingyas to study the Bangladesh curriculum as it does not want them to integrate into the country. Rohingya children could learn in Bengali easily because their native language is similar to the Chittagongian dialect of Bengali.

The only languages permitted in the learning centres of Rohingya refugee camps in Bangladesh are English, Burmese, and Arabic.

=== Closure of private schools ===
On 13 December 2021, the Refugee Relief and Repatriation Commissioner announced that private schools in Rohingya camps are illegal as they lack government approval and must be shut down. Since then, government authorities have shut down multiple such community-based and home-based learning centres, including schools teaching Myanmar curriculum, and confiscated their assets. Some of these schools were created because UNICEF-run primary schools did not serve children between ages 14 and 18.

The shutdowns are viewed as dangerous for the children, who are already vulnerable to crimes like drug trafficking. Nur Khan Liton, of the human rights organization Ain o Salish Kendra, said, "when they go back to their homeland, the Rohingya people won't get any good jobs".

== Water, sanitation, hygiene (WASH), and waste management aid ==
Following the large-scale displacement of Rohingya refugees into Bangladesh in 2017, efforts to improve water, sanitation, and hygiene (WASH) conditions have been undertaken by humanitarian organizations, NGOs, and the Bangladeshi government. Initiatives have focused on expanding clean water access, improving sanitation infrastructure, and promoting hygiene practices to mitigate health risks in the camps. In 2022, the Joint Response Plan (JRP) was introduced to coordinate the actions of 136 humanitarian organizations, including IOM and UNHCR, aiming to enhance WASH services in the refugee settlements.

Evaluations of these interventions, often funded by aid organizations, have played a role in assessing their effectiveness.

=== Water, sanitation, hygiene (WASH) aid ===
==== Water supply aid ====
The UNHCR, IOM, and UNICEF have led efforts to improve access to clean drinking water:

- Installation of tube wells: To provide clean water, humanitarian organizations installed over 5,700 tube wells between August and December 2017. However, by early 2018, approximately 21% of these wells were no longer functional, highlighting the challenges in maintaining water infrastructure in the refugee camps.
- Solar-powered water networks: By 2019, humanitarian organizations, including UNHCR, had set up 55 solar-powered water systems that provided chlorinated drinking water in the refugee camps. These systems distribute water from chlorinated tanks to tap stands located across the camps, supplying approximately 29% of the refugee population with safer drinking water.
- Water trucking: In times of critical water shortages, particularly in Teknaf, aid agencies such as UNHCR delivered water via trucks to affected camps. This emergency response method incurred high costs, reaching up to $60,000 per month for UNHCR.
- Water quality monitoring: Regular water quality surveillance has been established by the WHO, with water testing for E. coli contamination.

==== Sanitation and hygiene aid ====
Humanitarian organizations, including UNHCR, IOM, UNICEF, Oxfam, and BRAC, have constructed various types of latrines, such as direct pit latrines, twin pit latrines, and biogas latrines, to improve sanitation in Rohingya refugee camps. Several humanitarian organizations, including Oxfam, CARE Bangladesh, the Bangladesh Red Crescent Society (BRCS), and the Danish Red Cross (DRC), have introduced WASH facilities designed to meet the needs of women and girls. These facilities provide separate toilets, bathing areas, and laundry spaces to improve hygiene and privacy. Supported by funding from the United States Agency for International Development's Office of Foreign Disaster Assistance, these initiatives also incorporate features such as disposal systems for menstrual waste to enhance accessibility and dignity in sanitation practices.

In Rohingya refugee camps, hygiene assistance initiatives focus on providing essential items such as soap, menstrual health supplies, and underwears. Additionally, organizations involved in water, sanitation, and hygiene (WASH) programs carry out educational campaigns and community engagement activities to encourage improved hygiene practices. As part these efforts, ACTED has launched programs in camps 1E, 3, and 4, with financial support from CDCS and the SUEZ Foundation to train Rohingya women to manufacture reusable sanitary pads to enhance menstrual hygiene.

To mitigate the spread of COVID-19 in Rohingya refugee camps, aid organizations enhanced hygiene efforts by installing additional handwashing stations, distributing larger quantities of soap, and raising awareness through educational initiatives.

=== Waste management aid ===
In 2019, the Rohingya refugee camps in Bangladesh produced approximately 10,000 tons of waste per month. Due to the lack of proper disposal infrastructure, much of this waste was dumped in open sites, leading to significant health and environmental concerns. In response, organizations like Oxfam and Asian Development Bank (ADB) have set up fecal sludge treatment facilities to improve waste management. Moreover, funding from the European Civil Protection and Humanitarian Aid Operations (ECHO), IOM and its partner Dushtha Shasthya Kendra (DSK) have introduced a waste collection initiative where Rohingya volunteers visit households to gather waste. Despite these efforts, recycling remains largely unstructured, and significant infrastructure gaps continue to pose challenges.

Healthcare facilities in the Rohingya refugee camps lack a structured system for handling medical waste. As a result, hazardous materials such as syringes and medicine containers often end up in communal waste bins. The absence of clear disposal protocols increases the risk of disease spread and environmental hazards.

An evaluation from researchers at North South University''s Department of Civil and Environmental Engineering in Bangladesh assessed the potential of using plastic bottles as construction bricks and found that this method could both decrease plastic waste and offer an affordable building solution. A separate initiative supported by the ECHO enables Rohingya refugees to recycle plastic waste into practical materials like paving slabs and latrine covers.

== Militant supremacy and forced conscription ==
Rohingya Militant factions, including the Arakan Rohingya Salvation Army (ARSA) and the re-emerged Rohingya Solidarity Organisation (RSO), are widely documented to exploit the refugees' acute dependence on humanitarian aid for survival. The process involves threatening families with the revocation of their essential food aid ration cards or the closure of community religious schools unless they comply with the demand for military service. This strategy directly links survival needs to mandatory recruitment, thereby actively militarizing the refugee camps and fueling internal conflicts and turf wars among various armed entities, some of whom operate under the banner of Islamic nationalism. Furthermore, these militants systematically engage in massive financial extortion, demanding large sums of money from vulnerable families under the threat of punishment or enforced disappearance, creating a pervasive environment of fear and subjugation that undermines both the safety of the refugees and the neutrality of the humanitarian response.

Armed groups operating within the Rohingya refugee settlements have increasingly employed religious rhetoric to consolidate power and mobilize new fighters, particularly against the ethnic Rakhine Arakan Army. Following a "harmony" agreement between rival factions, including the RSO and ARSA, these groups have actively sought to legitimize their armed campaign. They utilize religious figures and communal gatherings to frame their struggle as a "jihad" against "non-believers, which they refer to Rakhine Buddhists," aiming to incite and recruit from the refugee population, including madrassa students and disaffected youth. This explicit use of Islamic theological concepts in their recruitment drives serves to galvanize support and assert a militant form of Rohingya self-representation in their conflict against the AA and for the claimed liberation of northern Rakhine State.

== Security implications for Bangladesh ==
A number of scholars have expressed concerns about the security implications for Bangladesh of the Rohingyas' prolonged stay. Bangladesh views the growing presence of armed and trained Rohingya militants near refugee camps as a looming threat, according to a security official. Each year, around 30,000 children are born into extreme poverty within these camps, which are plagued by frequent violence.

== Population table by camps ==
Camp name	Population As of 30 April 2020	Location
Kutupalong RC	16,713	Kutupalong RC & Expansion
Camp 1E	37,945	Kutupalong RC & Expansion
Camp 1W	38,005	Kutupalong RC & Expansion
Camp 2W	23,587	Kutupalong RC & Expansion
Camp 2E	25,659	Kutupalong RC & Expansion
Camp 3	35,599	Kutupalong RC & Expansion
Camp 4	29,854	Kutupalong RC & Expansion
Camp 4 Ext	6,691	Kutupalong RC & Expansion
Camp 5	24,437	Kutupalong RC & Expansion
Camp 6	22,726	Kutupalong RC & Expansion
Camp 7	36,652	Kutupalong RC & Expansion
Camp 8E	29,244	Kutupalong RC & Expansion
Camp 8W	30,683	Kutupalong RC & Expansion
Camp 9	32,846	Kutupalong RC & Expansion
Camp 10	29,771	Kutupalong RC & Expansion
Camp 11	29,668	Kutupalong RC & Expansion
Camp 12	25,662	Kutupalong RC & Expansion
Camp 13	41,610	Kutupalong RC & Expansion
Camp 14	31,930	Hakimpara
Camp 15	49,593	Jamtoli
Camp 16	20,859	Moynarghona
Camp 17	16,344	Kutupalong RC & Expansion
Camp 18	27,023	Kutupalong RC & Expansion
Camp 19	22,967	Kutupalong RC & Expansion
Camp 20	6,777	Kutupalong RC & Expansion
Camp 20 Ext	7,732	Kutupalong RC & Expansion
Camp 21	16,468	Chakmarkul
Camp 22	21,206	Unchiprang
Camp 23	10,494	Shamlapur
Camp 24	26,026	
Camp 25	7,403	
Camp 26	40,440	
Camp 27	14,921	
Nayapara RC	22,640	
Kutupalong RC & Expention Camps	598,195	
Total	860,175	

== See also ==
- Bihari Muslims in Bangladesh
- Human rights in Bangladesh
- List of massacres in Bangladesh
- Rohingya refugees in Nepal
- Rohingya refugees in India
