= Myanmar–Nepal relations =

- Myanmar: Nepal

Myanmar–Nepal relations refers to bilateral foreign relations between Myanmar and Nepal.

Bilateral relations were officially established on 19 March 1960. Nepal has an embassy in Yangon and Myanmar has an embassy in Kathmandu.

== See also ==
- Rohingya refugees in Nepal
