= AHA Gafur Chowdhury =

Bangladeshi politician

- আ হ আ গফুর চৌধুরী

Member of Parliament from Cox's Bazar-4
- In office 1986–1988
- Preceded by: Shahjahan Chowdhury
- Succeeded by: Abdul Gani

Personal details
- Party: Jatiya Party

AHA Gafur Chowdhury is a Jatiya Party politician and a former member of parliament for Cox's Bazar-4 in 1986.

== Career ==
Chowdhury was elected to parliament from Cox's Bazar-4 as a Jatiya Party candidate in the 1986 Bangladeshi general election.
