= Abdur Rahman Bodi =

Bangladeshi politician

- আব্দুর রহমান বদি

Member of Parliament
- In office 25 January 2009 – 24 January 2019
- Preceded by: Shahjahan Chowdhury
- Succeeded by: Shahin Akhtar
- Constituency: Cox's Bazar-4

Personal details
- Born: 4 January 1970 (age 56) Teknaf, Cox's Bazar, East Pakistan
- Party: Bangladesh Awami League
- Spouse: Shahin Akhtar

Abdur Rahman Bodi (born 4 January 1970) is a Bangladesh Awami League politician and a former Jatiya Sangsad member representing the Cox's Bazar-4 constituency during 2009–2019.

Bodi did not get the party's nomination for the 2018 Bangladeshi general election. Instead his wife, Shahin Akhtar, did and went on to win the election and became the incumbent member of the same constituency.

== Drug trafficking ==
In a June 2015 report, Bodi topped the list of 79 leading human traffickers of Cox's Bazar according the Ministry of Home Affairs. According to the Narcotics Control Department, he was the chief patron of the yaba smugglers. Bodi's constituency Teknaf is the only smuggling route of yaba through the Bangladesh-Myanmar border.

Bodi was also one of the facilitators who help Rohingya people get on the voter list and get a national identity card illegally. In July 2016, he was accused of being present in a meeting of Rohingya Solidarity Organization, an insurgency group in Myanmar, by Lieutenant Colonel Abuzar Al Jahid, commanding officer of Border Guards Bangladesh. A team of the guards had raided the meeting.

== Charges and convictions ==
In 2007, the Anti-Corruption Commission (ACC) accused Bodi for hiding information of Tk 43.4 lakh and accumulating wealth of Tk 66.7 lakh from unknown sources of income. He was indicted for this case in September 2020.

On 21 August 2014, ACC accused Bodi of amassing wealth illegally and concealing information in his wealth statement. He was convicted and sentenced to three years in prison on corruption charges in November 2016. He secured a bail from Bangladesh High Court in the case. In May 2022, High Court cleared the way for the lower court to run the trial proceedings of that case.

He was arrested in 2024 on charges of violence against protesters following the July Revolution, but was released on bail in the first of 2026.
