= Shahjahan Chowdhury =

Bangladeshi politician

- শাহজাহান চৌধুরী

Member of Parliament
- Incumbent
- Assumed office 17 February 2026
- Preceded by: Shahin Akhtar
- Constituency: Cox's Bazar-4
- In office 1 October 2001 – 29 October 2006
- Preceded by: Mohammad Ali
- Succeeded by: Abdur Rahman Bodi
- Constituency: Cox's Bazar-4
- In office 27 February 1991 – 15 February 1996
- Preceded by: Abdul Gani
- Succeeded by: Mohammad Ali
- Constituency: Cox's Bazar-4

Personal details
- Born: Rajapalong, Cox's Bazar, East Bengal
- Party: Bangladesh Nationalist Party
- Other political affiliations: National Democratic Party
- Education: University of Chittagong; Chittagong College

Shahjahan Chowdhury (Bengali: শাহজাহান চৌধুরী) is a Bangladesh Nationalist Party politician and the current Member of Parliament for Cox's Bazar-4.

== Early life and family ==
Shahjahan was born on 31 December 1952 in the village of Rajapalong in Ukhia, Cox's Bazar subdivision, then part of the Chittagong district of East Bengal, Pakistan. He belongs to a landed Bengali family of Muslim Chowdhuries with strong political roots. His father, Abul Kashem Chowdhury, served as chairman of the undivided Rajapalong Union Council. His grandfather Maqbul Ahmad Chowdhury served as president of the undivided Rajapalong Union Board and is the namesake of the Middle Rajapalong Maqbul Ahmad Chy Model Noorani Academy and Ibtedayi Madrasa. Shahjahan's brother Advocate A. K. Muhammad Shahjalal Chowdhury was chairman of the Ukhia Subdistrict Council from 2009 to 2013 and a four-time president of the Cox's Bazar Lawyers' Society. His other brother, Alhaj A. K. Muhammad Shahkamal Chowdhury, was a four-time chairman of the Rajapalong Union Council and founder of the Abul Kashem Noorjahan Chowdhury High School, while his youngest brother Sarwar Jahan Chowdhury was chairman of the Ukhia Subdistrict Council in 2014.

Chowdhury completed his initial studies locally in Ukhia before completing his Intermediate of Arts from the Chittagong College. He graduated with a Bachelor of Arts with honours in sociology from the University of Chittagong in 1975.

== Career ==
Chowdhury was elected to parliament from Cox's Bazar-4 as a Bangladesh Nationalist Party candidate in 2001. Smuggling is a well known problem in the constituency, which encompasses Teknaf and Ukhia upazilas, both of which border Myanmar. Chowdhury is said to have been supported by "the man allegedly leading smuggling operations in Teknaf". He contested the seat again in 2018, but was defeated by Shahin Akhtar, the Awami League candidate. He is the president of the Cox's Bazar unit of the Bangladesh Nationalist Party.
