= ATM Zafar Alam =

- এ.টি.এম. জাফর আলম
- Born: 5 May 1947; Cox's Bazar District, Bengal Presidency, British India (Present: Bangladesh)
- Died: 25 March 1971 (aged 23); Shaheed Sergeant Zahurul Huq Hall, University of Dhaka
- Occupations: Student Leader; Civil Servant
- Awards: Independence Day Award (2019)

ATM Zafar Alam (5 May 1947 – 25 March 1971) was a renowned student leader of Bangladesh. He was awarded the Independence Day Award in 2019 for his unique general contribution to the Bangladesh Liberation war.

== Early life ==
Jafar Alam was born on 5 May 1947 in Matabbar Para village of Rumkha Palang in Haldia Palang Union of Ukhia Upazila under Cox's Bazar district of the then Bengal Presidency, British India (now Bangladesh).

== Career ==
After finishing his education, Alam passed the then Pakistan Civil Service (CSP) examination and was appointed as the SDO of Noakhali.

== Death and legacy ==
Alam was killed on 25 March in the 1971 Dhaka University massacre by Pakistan Army.

Alam was awarded the Independence Day Award, Bangladesh's highest civilian honor, in 2019 for his outstanding contribution to Bangladesh's independence movement and Bangladesh Liberation war.

Alam's brother, Mohammad Shafiul Alam, is the Cabinet Secretary of Bangladesh. He is the chairperson of the Board of Trustees of Shaheed Zafar Alam Diabetic and Community Hospital, named after Alam. Shaheed ATM Zafar Alam CSP conference room in Cox's Bazar was named after him.
