= Shahin Akhtar =

Bangladeshi politician

- শাহিন আখতার

Member of the Bangladesh Parliament for Cox's Bazar-4
- In office 7 January 2019 – 6 August 2024
- Preceded by: Abdur Rahman Bodi
- Succeeded by: Shahjahan Chowdhury

Personal details
- Born: 29 February 1976 (age 50) Cox's Bazar, Bangladesh
- Party: Bangladesh Awami League
- Spouse: Abdur Rahman Bodi
- Education: BA
- Occupation: Business

Shahin Akhtar is a Bangladesh Awami League politician and a former Jatiya Sangsad member representing the Cox's Bazar-4 constituency.

== Career ==
Akhtar was elected to parliament from Cox's Bazar-4 as a Bangladesh Awami League candidate on 30 December 2018. She is married to Abdur Rahman Bodi, the previous member of parliament for Cox's Bazar-4.
