= Groupe du Louvre =

French company

Louvre Hotel Group
- Native name: Groupe du Louvre
- Industry: Hospitality
- Headquarters: Nanterre, France
- Number of locations: 1700+
- Area served: Worldwide
- Key people: Federico J. González, CEO
- Services: Hotels
- Parent: Jinjiang International
- Website: louvrehotels.com

Groupe du Louvre or Louvre Hotel Group is a French company operating several hotel brands with over 1700 locations headquartered in La Défense in Nanterre, France.

== History ==
The luxury hotels division (previously known as Société du Louvre) can trace its origins to a company founded on 26 March 1855 to operate Les Galeries du Louvre, later Grands Magasins du Louvre, a department store and the Grand Hôtel du Louvre. These shared a large building on the Place du Palais Royal in Paris, France.

The company was owned by the American investment company Starwood Capital Group following its earlier purchase of Société du Louvre in December 2005. Since 2009, the Golden Tulip hotels were integrated into the group following their purchase of Golden Tulip Hospitality Group from administration by Starwood Capital. The group previously owned the Paris Hôtel de Crillon but sold it at the end of 2010. The company sold the perfume firm Annick Goutal to the South Korean giant Amore Pacific in 2011.

The range of hotel brands was extended in 2009 with the purchase of Golden Tulip Hospitality Group. Groupe du Louvre and Louvre Hotels Group was sold to Jinjiang International in 2015.

== Brands ==
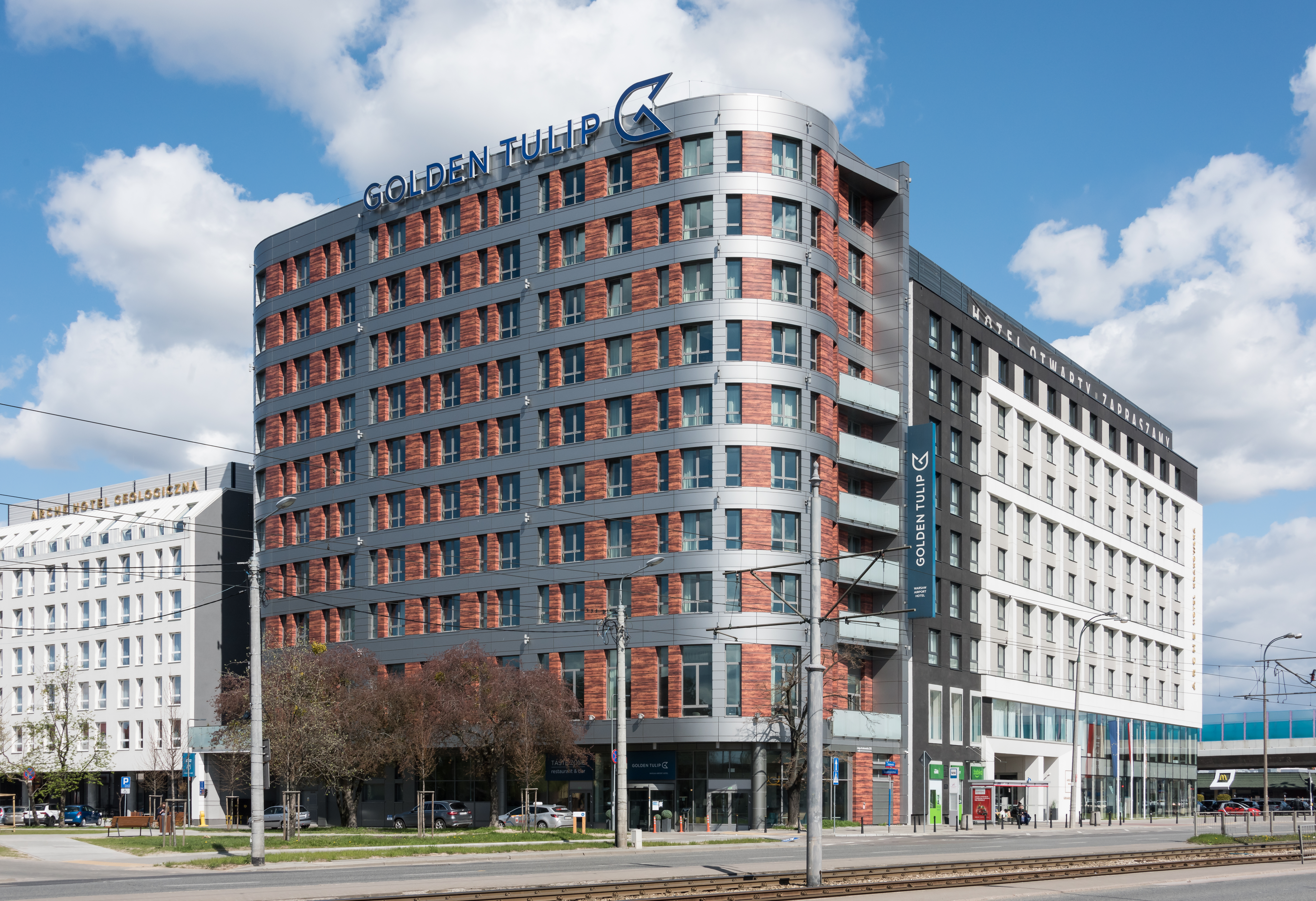
Golden Tulip in Warsaw

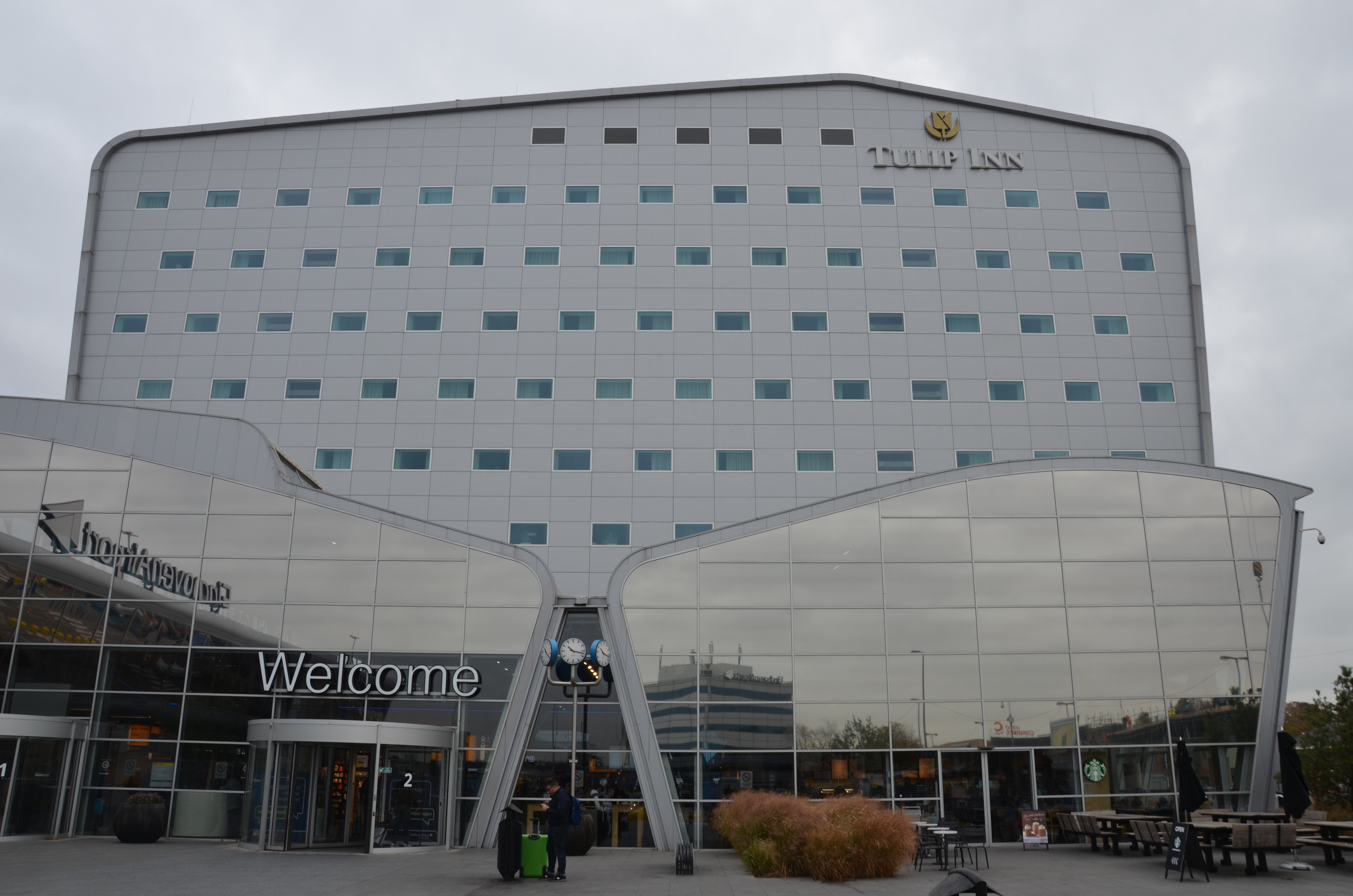
Tulip Inn in Eindhoven

As of 2024, Groupe du Louvre owns and operates over 1700 hotels under the following brands:

Budget

- Première Classe - budget hotels
- Hosho - budget hotels
- Kyriad Direct - budget hotels

Midscale

- Kyriad - midscale hotels
- Campanile - midscale hotels
- Tulip Inn - midscale hotels
- Tulip Hotels & Residences - midscale and long-stay hotels

Upscale

- Golden Tulip - upscale hotels
- Royal Tulip - luxury hotels
- Hôtels & Préférence - upscale un-branded properties
- Sarovar - upscale hotels with several sub-brands in India
- TemptingPlaces - upscale boutique hotels

== See also ==
- Sea Pearl Beach Resort & Spa
