= Rohingya refugees in India =

Displaced people from Myanmar in India

Rohingya people
𐴌𐴗𐴥𐴝𐴙𐴚𐴒𐴙𐴝
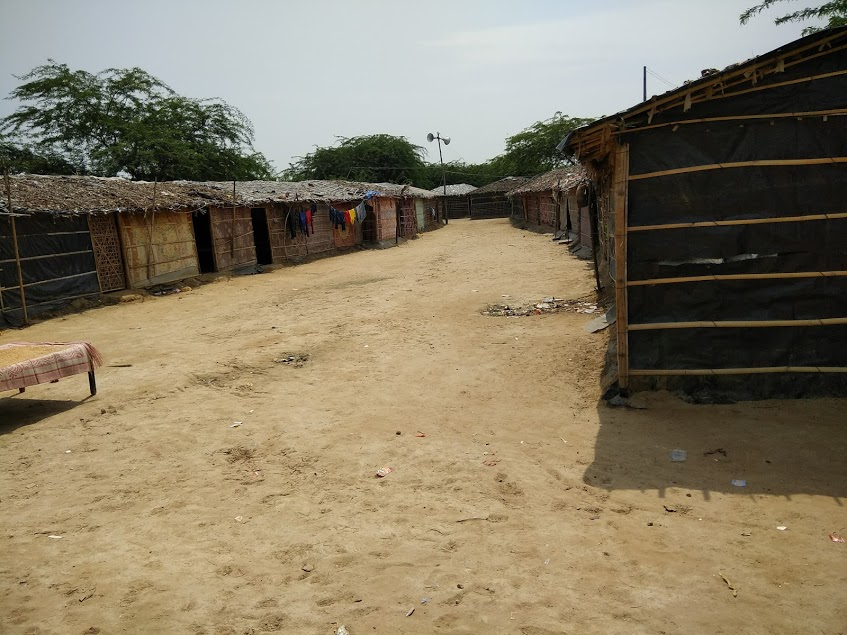
- Rohingya refugee camp in Nuh, Haryana

Total population
- 40,000 (documented)

Regions with significant populations
- Jammu; Hyderabad; Delhi; Nuh

Languages
- Rohingya, Burmese, Bengali, Chittagonian

Religion
- Predominantly Muslims; minorities of Hindus and Christians

Around 40,000 Rohingya live in slums and detention camps across the Republic of India, including Jammu, Hyderabad, Nuh, and Delhi, the majority of whom are undocumented. According to Indian law, illegal immigrants are not refugees. Since India is not a signatory to the 1951 Refugee Convention, the United Nations principle of non-refoulement and impediment to expulsion does not apply in India. Illegal immigrants are denied impediment to expulsion if they do not fall within the host country's legal definition of a lawful refugee. On 9 August 2012, during a Supreme Court hearing about a public interest litigation petition for deportation of illegal migrants, it was told that the policy of the government of India does not support any kind of illegal migration either into its territory or illegal immigration of its citizens and the government is committed to deporting illegal migrants, but only lawfully. In August 2017, the Bharatiya Janata Party led Union Government asked state governments to initiate the process of deportation for all illegal immigrants including Rohingyas. This was challenged before the Supreme Court of India by three Rohingya refugees, wherein the Government of India submitted an affidavit claiming that there were over 40,000 "illegal [Rohingya] immigrants", mostly spread across Assam, West Bengal and Jammu and Kashmir and that they were a threat to the security of state.

Rohingyas add economic pressure on Indian populace; due to their perceived militant activities, they pose a security threat, especially in sensitive areas such as Jammu and West Bengal. In 2017, the Central Government filed an affidavit in the Supreme Court stating that "Some Rohingyas sympathizing with many militant group's ideologies may be active in Jammu, Delhi, Hyderabad, and Mewat and can be a potential threat to internal security." In 2025, Supreme Court of India pulled up the government of Assam state over delay in deportation of illegal foreigners including Rohingyas and ordered the immediate action.

== Legal status ==
Under the Indian law Rohingyas are illegal immigrants, not refugees. Illegal immigrants are subjected to The Foreigners Act (1946), which defines a foreigner as a person who is not a citizen of India. Where the nationality of a person is not evident, the onus of proving whether a person is a foreigner or not lie upon the person himself. Anyone who believes that a foreigner has entered India, or who is the owner or managers of the property where a foreigner resides illegally, must inform the nearest police station within 24 hours of the presence of such foreigner. The Foreigners Act allows the government to detain a foreigner until he is deported back to his own country.

India is not a signatory to the 1951 UN Refugee Convention or its 1967 Protocol and lacks a domestic asylum law, leading to the absence of a formal refugee protection regime. As a result, Indian immigration law does not distinguish between general foreigners and refugees or asylum-seekers, and there is no guaranteed right to seek asylum under Indian law. However, the principle of non-refoulment, which prohibits returning refugees to a country where they may face persecution, is recognised as binding under customary international law and applies globally. In 2017, the Indian Supreme Court acknowledged that Rohingya refugees in India fall under this principle. Although India is not a party to the Refugee Convention, it is bound by other international instruments such as the Universal Declaration of Human Rights (1948), the International Covenant on Civil and Political Rights (1966), and the Convention on the Rights of the Child (1989), which outline rights for detainees, including women and children.

However, in April 2021, the Supreme Court declined to intervene in a plea concerning the deportation of Rohingyas. Then Chief Justice Sharad Bobde stated: “Possibly, that is the fear that if they go back to Myanmar, they will be slaughtered… But we cannot control all that… we are not called upon to condemn or condone genocide”.

In 2024, in response to a plea to treat Rohingyas similarly to refugees from Tibet and Sri Lanka, the union government submitted to the Supreme Court that such recognition is a matter of "pure policy decision", not judicial declaration. Thus, equality rights under Article 14 of the Constitution are not available to Rohingyas, unlike other refugee groups from Tibet, Sri Lanka and Afghanistan, who had historically been accommodated through policy decisions and are provided with refugee certificates or long-term visas.

The United Nations High Commissioner for Refugees (UNHCR) in India recognizes Rohingyas as refugees and has registered over 22,500 individuals in India. Those registered are provided with identity cards, intended to protect them from arbitrary arrests and deportations. However, the Indian government does not officially recognize the UNHCR refugee cards, and they not offer protection from detention. The cards only serve to provide access to some services. At best, they protect from punitive action.

From 2012 to 2017, some Rohingya refugees were issued Long Term Visas (LTVs) by the Indian government based on UNHCR cards, enabling access to limited services, documentation, and school enrollment. However, an August 2017 executive order reversed this approach by instructing states to identify and deport all Rohingyas, classifying them as illegal immigrants.

In addition to lack of documentation and protection within India, some Rohingyas who have secured third-country resettlement offers through the UNHCR have been denied exit permits by Indian authorities. These denials are often justified on national security grounds and the assertion that individuals classified as illegal migrants have no right to leave voluntarily. As a result, Rohingyas who get a chance to resettle in third countries, remain unable to depart.

== National security threat ==
The Indian government has the evidence linking Rohingyas in India with terrorist organisation that are national security threat to India. Indian government submitted an affidavit to the supreme court affirming, "[The] Rohingya presence in the country has serious national security ramifications. There is [a] serious possibility of eruption of violence against Buddhists who are Indian citizens and who stay on Indian soil by radicalized Rohingyas".

In 2018, India's National Investigation Agency (NIA) started court prosecution against a Rohingya man Samiun Rahman for being in-charge of building and expanding the Al-Qaeda terrorist group in the Indian sub-continent. He fought for al-Qaeda in Syria, then travelled to Bangladesh and India to recruit people to establish "an al-Qaeda base in the Indian sub-continent". He told NIA that India, Bangladesh, United States and Israel are al-Qaeda’s prime targets for terrorism.

In 2017, the Muslim Arakan Rohingya Salvation Army (ARSA) was responsible for the massacre of 99 Hindus in 2017 in Kha Maung Seik.

== Jammu detentions ==
Following a military crackdown of the Rohingyas' in Myanmar in 2017, approximately 5,000 Rohingyas sought refuge in Jammu. In 2021, authorities in Jammu detained more than 160 refugees, with the purpose of deporting them to Myanmar. By July 2023, 271 Rohingyas — including 74 women and 70 children — were reported to be detained at Hiranagar Jail in Kathua, Jammu, which is used as a "holding centre" for the refugees. Families of these refugees have raised concerns about the perilous conditions in Myanmar, particularly following the 2021 Myanmar coup d'état.

After the Bharatiya Janata Party came to power in 2014, anti-Rohingya sentiment grew in India, with its leaders urging the removal of Rohingyas from the country. The Rohingyas have protested against their detention in Jammu by going on hunger strikes and demonstrations. In July 2023, a clash occurred between the detainees — on a hunger strike since April — and the police, with the latter resolving to using tear gas to control what they called an unruly mob. A few days after the incident, a five-month old baby died after failing to receive treatment after inhaling the gas.

Leaders of the BJP have initiated campaigns calling for the expulsion of all Rohingya.

== Access to education ==
The Right of Children to Free and Compulsory Education (RTE) Act, 2009 applies to all children aged 6 to 14 years within Indian territory, irrespective of citizenship. Article 21A of the Indian Constitution and India’s ratification of the Convention on the Rights of the Child (CRC) further reinforce this right. However, Rohingya children are effectively denied access to education due to several barriers. Most Rohingya families lack official documents such as Aadhaar cards, birth certificates, or transfer certificates which are often treated as prerequisites for school admission, despite not being mandated by the RTE Act. Additionally, UNHCR issued refugee cards are not consistently recognised across states, further restricting access to education.

In December 2024, the then Chief Minister of Delhi, Atishi, announced a directive explicitly instructing government schools not to admit Rohingya children.

While hearing a plea regarding school access for Rohingya children in February 2025, the Supreme Court stated that matters of national security cannot be used as blanket justification for denying fundamental rights, including education and that “no child will be discriminated against in education”.

== Allegations of Deportation at Sea ==
On 7 May 2025, several reports alleged that 38 Rohingya refugees in India were deported by Indian authorities and left stranded in international waters near the Myanmar coast. Media reports stated that the refugees holding UNHCR identity cards were detained in Delhi, one day prior to their deportation. OHCHR confirmed that they were transferred to a naval vessel and forced into the sea wearing life jackets. The UNHCR has reported a similar incident occurring in May, where 427 Rohingya refugees died in international waters. They were fleeing from areas including Cox Bazar, Bangladesh and Rakhine State in Myanmar. While yet to be confirmed, out of approximately 514 Rohingya, 66 survived on 9 May and 21 survived on 10 May. UNHCR is requesting countries nearby Myanmar to uphold humanitarian obligations towards the surviving refugees under international law. The alleged deportations violate the principle of non-refoulment which prohibits returning refugees to countries where they face a real risk of persecution.

On 8 May 2025, the Supreme Court of India heard the case argued by “Senior Advocate Colin Gonsalves and Advocate Prashant Bhushan appearing for the petitioners, and Solicitor General Tushar Mehta appearing for the Union.” The Supreme Court dismissed the allegations of mistreatment and illegal deportation against the Indian government for lack of prima facie evidence. The Union claims that India is not a signatory to the 1951 Refugee Convention, and therefore domestic laws hold precedence over principles of international law. The Court held that the right to reside under Article 19(1)(e) only protects citizens of India, and thus, Rohingya do not have any legal right to permanent residency, resulting in deportation subjected to due process. The case is still pending in Court.

The UHRI condemns India for criminalising the Rohingya by classifying them as a security threat. The Committee has recommended India to conform to international law and consider ratifying the 1951 Refugee Convention to better protect refugees.

== See also ==
- Rohingya refugees in Nepal
- Rohingya refugees in Bangladesh
- Kha Maung Seik massacre of Hindus by Rohingyas
- Terrorism in India
