= Inani Beach =

Part of Cox's Bazar Beach

Coordinates: 21.185°N 92.048°E

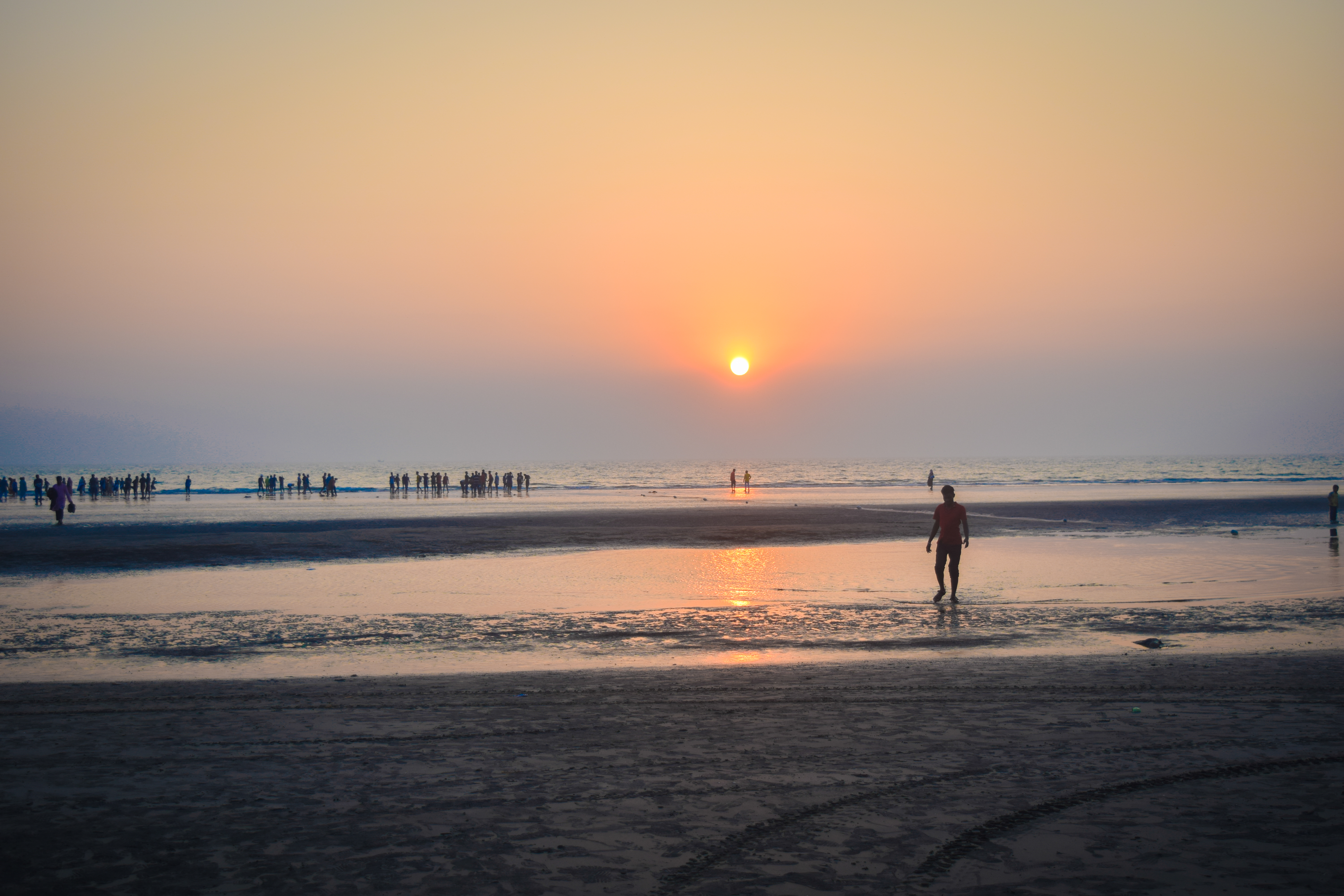
Sunset at Inani Beach

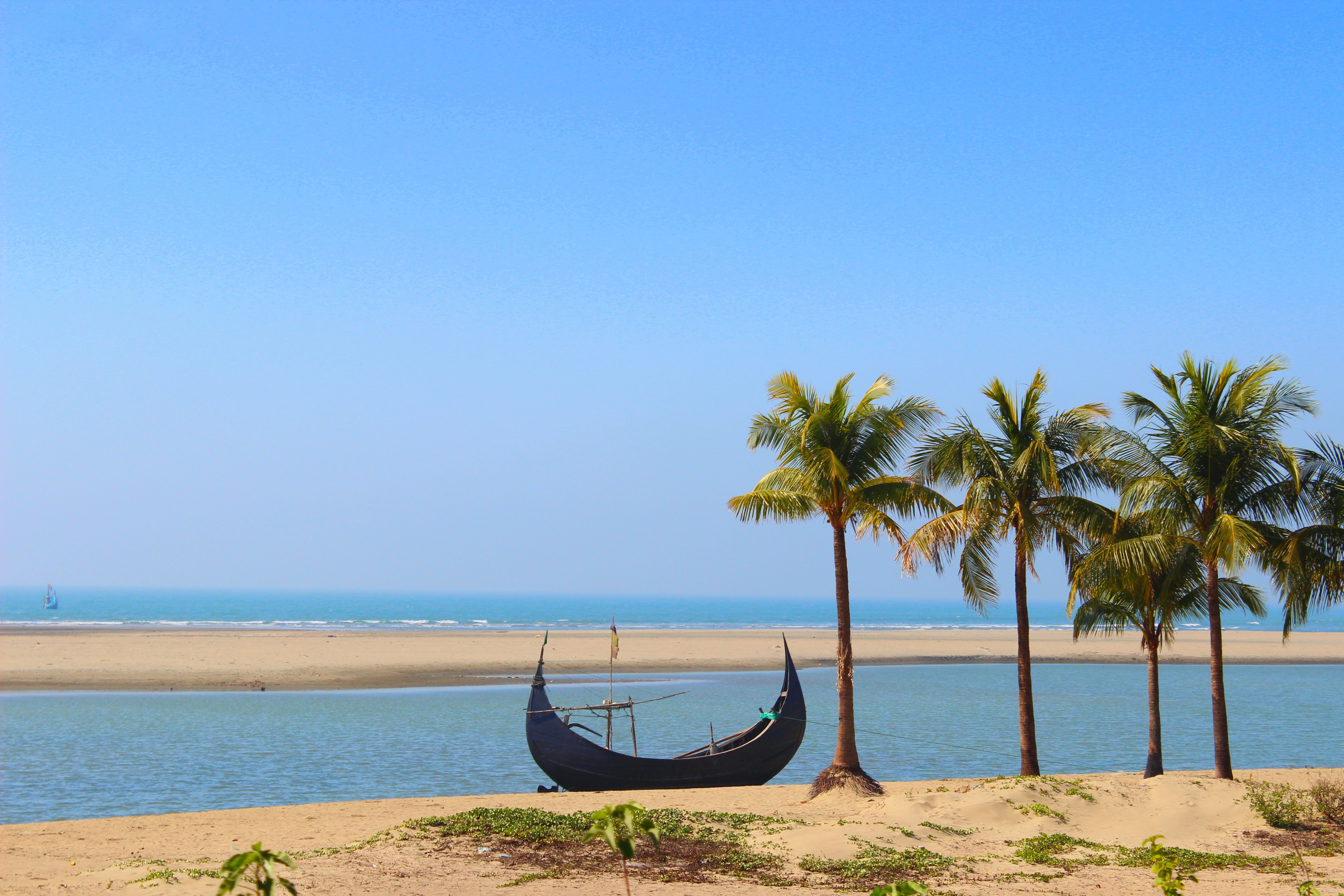
Inani Beach

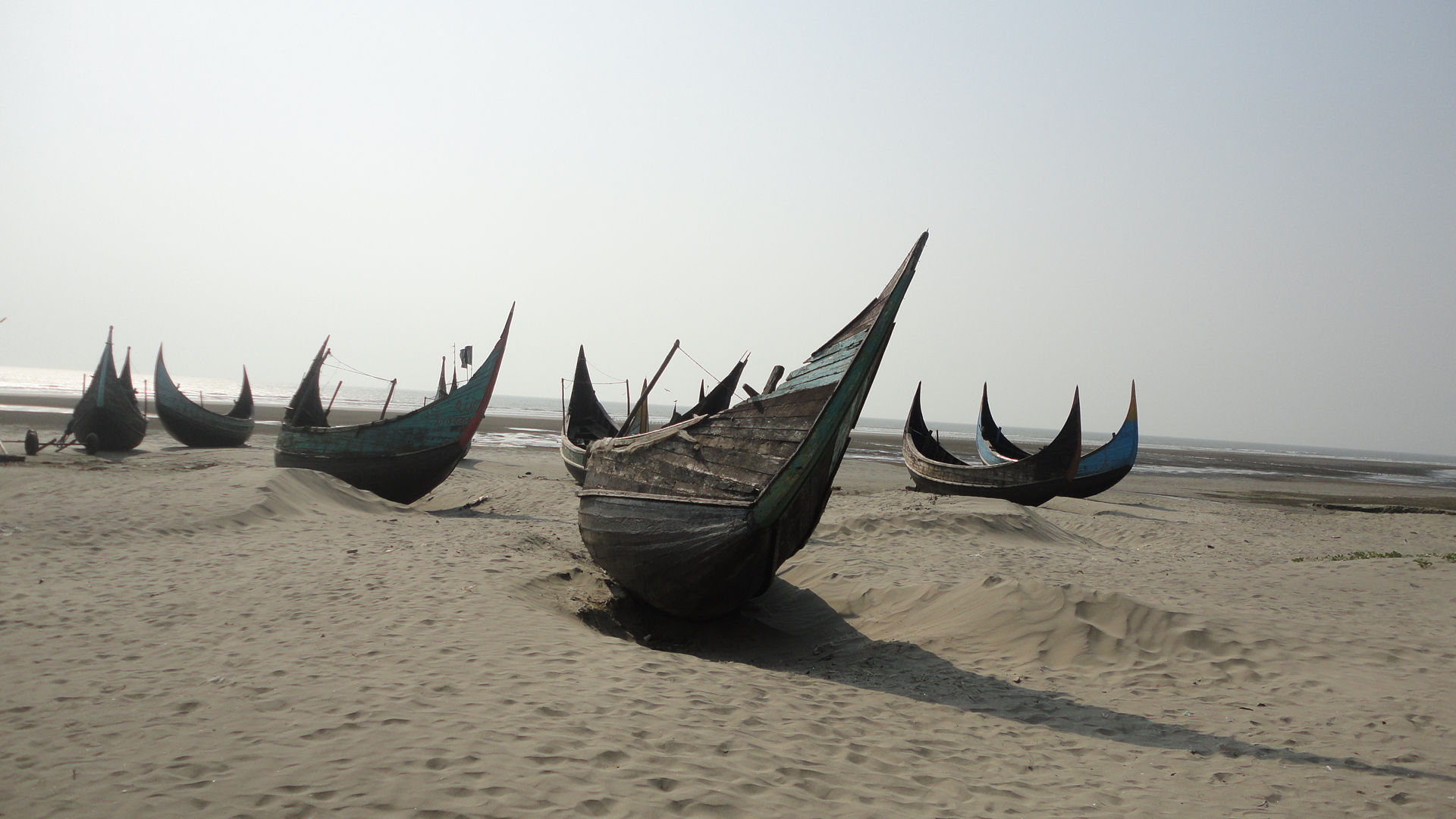
Boat at beach area

Inani Beach (Bengali: ইনানী সৈকত), part of Cox's Bazar Beach, is an 18-kilometre-long (11 mi) sea beach in Ukhia Upazila of Cox's Bazar District, Bangladesh. It has a lot of coral stones, which are very sharp. These coral stones look black and green, and they are found in summer or rainy seasons.
