= Office of the Refugee Relief and Repatriation Commissioner =

Bangladesh government agency

- Formation: 1992
- Headquarters: Cox's Bazar District, Bangladesh
- Region served: Bangladesh
- Official language: Bengali
- Website: rrrc.gov.bd

The Office of the Refugee Relief and Repatriation Commissioner (Bengali: শরণার্থী ত্রাণ ও প্রত্যাবাসন কমিশনারের কার্যালয়) is a Bangladesh government agency under the Ministry of Disaster Management and Relief responsible for providing relief to Rohingya refugees in Bangladesh and plan their eventual repatriation to Myanmar. Shah Rezwan Hayat is the incumbent commissioner.

== History ==
The Office of the Refugee Relief and Repatriation Commissioner was established in 1992 when the first wave of Rohingya refugees, about 250 thousand, arrived from Myanmar. The office is located in Cox's Bazar District. Mahbub Alam Talukder was appointed commissioner on 2 September 2019 replacing Abul Kalam.

In January 2021, the Foreign Ministry of Bangladesh wrote to the Office of the Refugee Relief and Repatriation Commissioner to establish a repatriation wing in Cox's Bazar to coordinate with Ministry in Dhaka.
