= Mohammad Ali (Cox's Bazar politician) =

Bangladeshi politician (c.1944–2020)

Member of Bangladesh Parliament

Personal details
- Born: c. 1944
- Died: 13 November 2020
- Party: Bangladesh Awami League

Mohammad Ali (c. 1944 – 13 November 2020) was a Bangladesh Awami League politician who was a member of parliament for Cox's Bazar-4.

== Career ==
Ali was elected to parliament from Cox's Bazar-4 as a Bangladesh Awami League candidate in 2001.

== Death ==
Ali died on 13 November 2020 in Cox's Bazar Sadar Hospital, Cox's Bazar.
