= Rohingya refugees in Nepal =

Displaced people from Myanmar in Nepal

Rohingya refugees came to Nepal for asylum from Rakhine state of Myanmar. The Rohingyas entered Nepal in the 1990s and mainly in 2012. They came via eastern Nepal by crossing Bangladesh and India. They have been settled in Kapan at Kathmandu and various locations in Terai.

== Population ==
The exact population of Rohingya in Nepal is unknown. The shelter in Kapan (rented land in Lasuntar and Hattigauda) at Kathmandu has 300 Rohingya refugees. The total number of Rohingya all over Nepal is estimated between 600 and 3000.

== Legal status ==
Since Nepal has not signed the 1951 Refugee Convention or the 1967 Protocol, Nepal has no legal obligation to serve the refugees. However, Nepal has ratified human rights treaties such as specified by the Geneva Convention hence it is in position to guard the rights of Rohingya. Thus, Nepal does not recognize the Rohingya community as refugees but as illegal immigrants.

UN refugee agencies provides them identity cards and Rs 5,000 allowance per family per month which does not meet their basic need.

== Illegal activities ==
In 2015, five Rohingya refugees were found to illegally possess Nepalese passports issued in Morang. They successfully entered Saudi Arabia with these passports.

== See also ==
- Refugees in Nepal
- Rohingya refugees in India
