= Ukhia Upazila =

Ukhia উখিয়া
- Upazila
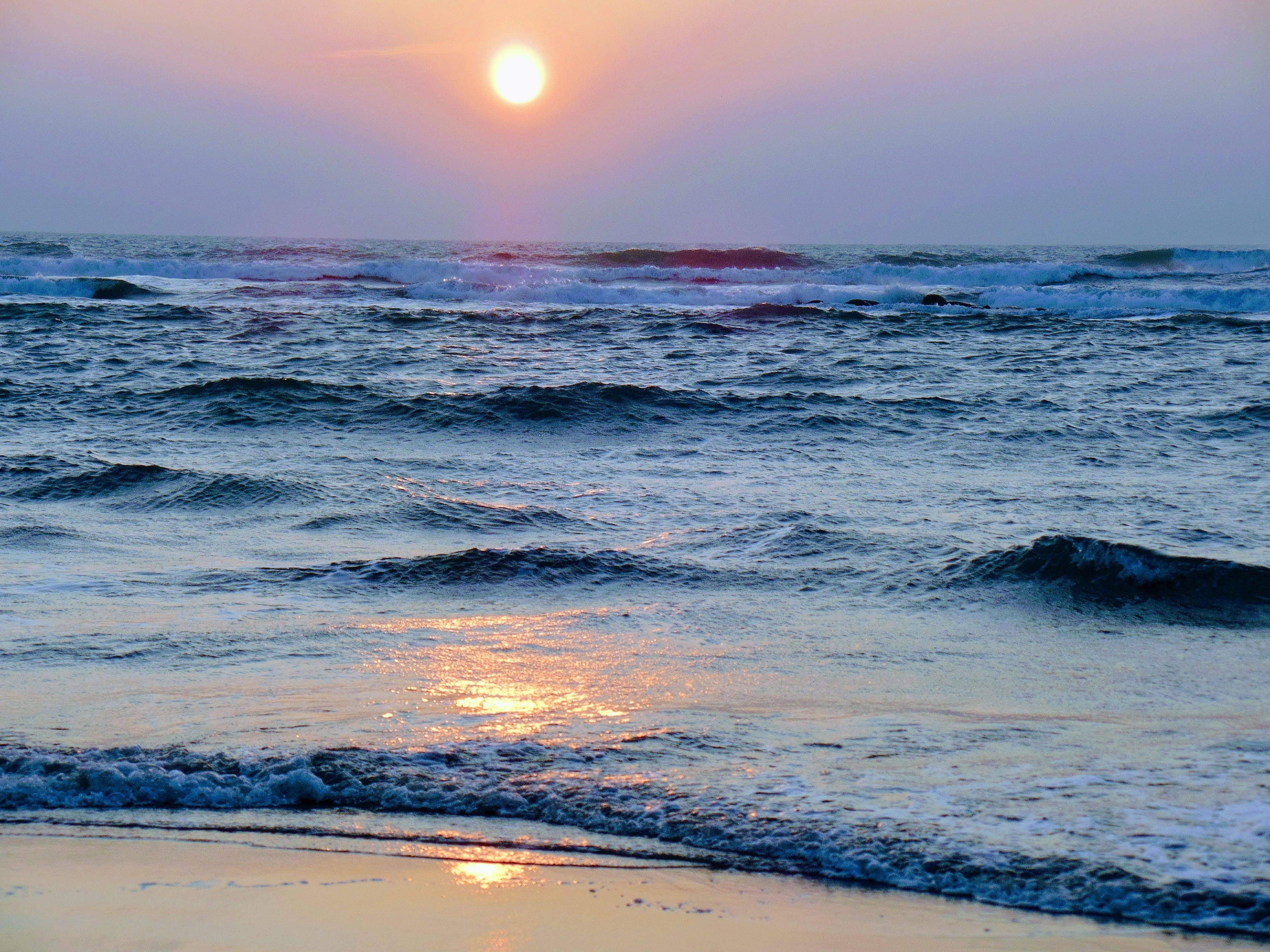
- Inani Beach

- Coordinates: 21°17′N 92°6′E
- Country: Bangladesh
- Division: Chittagong
- District: Cox's Bazar

Area
  - Total: 261.8 km^{2} (101.1 sq mi)

Population (2022)
  - Total: 263,158
  - Density: 1,005/km^{2} (2,603/sq mi)
- Time zone: UTC+6 (BST)
- Postal code: 4750
- Area code: 03427
- Website: ukhiya.coxsbazar.gov.bd

Ukhia (Bengali: উখিয়া) is an upazila of Cox's Bazar District in the Division of Chittagong, Bangladesh.

== Geography ==
Ukhia is located at 21.2833°N 92.1000°E. It has 37,940 households and a total area of 261.8 km^{2}.

== Demographics ==
Religions in Ukhia Upazila (2022)
Religion	Percent
Islam	92.78%
Buddhism	4.99%
Hinduism	2.12%
Other or not stated	0.12%

According to the 2022 Bangladeshi census, Ukhia Upazila had 55,966 households and a population of 263,158. 12.31% of the population were under 5 years of age. Ukhia had a literacy rate (age 7 and over) of 69.95%: 71.22% for males and 68.65% for females, and a sex ratio of 102.36 males for every 100 females. 67,650 (25.71%) lived in urban areas. Ethnic population is 2,451 (0.66%), of which the Chakma 960 and Tanchangya were 469.

== Administration ==
Ukhia Upazila is divided into five union parishads: Holdia Palong, Jalia Palong, Raja Palong, Ratna Palong, and Palong Khali. The union parishads are subdivided into 13 mauzas and 54 villages.

== Education ==
High schools: Ukhiya Government Multilateral High School, Ukhiya Girl's High School, Abul Kashem Noor Jahan Chowdhury High School, Thaingkhali high school, Balukhali Kashemia High School, Palong Model High School, Rumkha Palong High School, Sonar Para High School, Kutupalong High School, Jalia Palong High school, Bhalukia Palong High School. Rumkha Palong Hatirguna Shaira Govt. Primary School, Bhalukia Palong Govt. Primary School, Kutupalong Primary School. Monkhali Chakma_para gov't. primary school. Moricha Phalong High School. Shaleh Bulbul govt. Primary School. Nolbania govt. Primary School, Abdur Rahman Bodi Gov't Primary School.

=== Madrasha ===
Rumkha Palong Islamia Alim Madrasha, Rathna Palong Fazil Degree Madrasha, Sunar Para Ahmadia Sunnia Dakhil Madrasha.

== Hospital ==
- Upazila Health Complex, Ukhia.
- Origin Hospital - The first private hospital in Ukhia Upazila dedicated to the service of the people.
- Ukhiya Specialized Hospital

== Media ==
- Ukhiya News

== Voluntary organizations ==
- Uriya Open Scout Group
- WAFA (we are for all)
- Hasi Mukh Foundation
- Ukhiya blood donation unit
- YOU (youth organization of ukhiya)
- PROTTASHA
- Taipalong Adorso Somiti
- Taipalong jhubo shomprithi
- Hatmura Islami Sishu-Kishur Kollan Somiti
- Hasighor Foundation

== NGO working ==
Good Neighbors Bangladesh, Friendship, BNPS, CARE Bangladesh, Food for the Hungry (FH Association), MSF (Doctors without Borders), SHED (Society for Health Extension & Development), Brac, Pulse Bangladesh, Nacom, Muslim Aid, Uddipon, Rtm, Tai, Save the children, IOM, Mukti cox's Bazar, ACF, DRC, IPSA, CODEC, Aid Cumilla, Caritas Bangladesh, Muslim Hands International, NRC, and Plan International.

== Notable people ==
- Obaidullah Hamzah, Islamic scholar and economist
- Shahjahan Chowdhury
- Mohammad Shafiul Alam
- ATM Zafar Alam
- Shaheda Akter Ripa

== See also ==
- Upazilas of Bangladesh
- Districts of Bangladesh
- Divisions of Bangladesh
