= Battle of Konarpara Refugee Camp =

Clash during the Myanmar Civil War (2023)

Coordinates: 21°12′N 92°11′E

- Part of the Rohingya conflict during the Myanmar civil war (2021–present)
Date	January 20, 2023
Location	No-man's-land near Konarpara Refugee Camp, Myanmar
Result	RSO victory

Belligerents
Arakan Rohingya Salvation Army	Rohingya Solidarity Organisation

Commanders and leaders
Ataullah abu Ammar Jununi	Unknown

Strength
Unknown	100

Casualties and losses
Unknown, heavy	Unknown
- 1 killed 1 injured 3,000 refuges

Between January 18 and February 5, 2023, militants from the Rohingya Solidarity Organisation (RSO) laid siege to Arakan Rohingya Salvation Army (ARSA) militants in Konarpara refugee camp, near Tambru, on the Burmese side of the Myanmar-Bangladesh border.

== Background ==
Throughout the Rohingya genocide's peak in 2017, several Rohingya militant groups have embedded themselves in refugee camps along the Myanmar-Bangladesh border. Of the ten militant groups active in the camps in early 2023, the Rohingya Solidarity Organisation (RSO) and Arakan Rohingya Salvation Army (ASA) are two of the largest. Both ARSA and the RSO are active in the Konarpara refugee camp, a smaller camp near the village of Tambru in Bangladesh.

Around 3,000 residents live in the no-man's-land where the battle took place, in the Burmese side of the border. After their camps were torched during the fighting, no residents lived in the area and all had fled to Bangladesh.

== Battle ==
At 6:28 am on January 20, around a hundred RSO militants besieged an ARSA meeting that was taking place in the area. The RSO was attempting to establish supremacy over the camp. Battles lasted for two and a half hours, and restarted again between 2pm and 3pm. Later in the afternoon, ARSA fighters torched the camp likely because they ran out of ammunition. Bangladeshi Home Minister Asaduzzaman Khan stated that ARSA was likely targeted in the battle.

One person, a resident of Kutupalong refugee camp named Hamid Ullah, was killed. A second man named Mohib Ullah was injured with bullet wounds. After the battle concluded, RSO fighters seized control of the camp and discovered several bunkers used by ARSA. Neither the RSO nor ARSA claimed responsibility for the fighting. The day after the battle, wanted posters in Burmese appeared in Kutupalong and Balukhali refugee camp depicting ARSA leader Ataullah abu Ammar Jununi and 27 other ARSA members.
