= Rohingya genocide =

Ongoing genocide in Myanmar

- Part of the Rohingya conflict and Persecution of Muslims in Myanmar
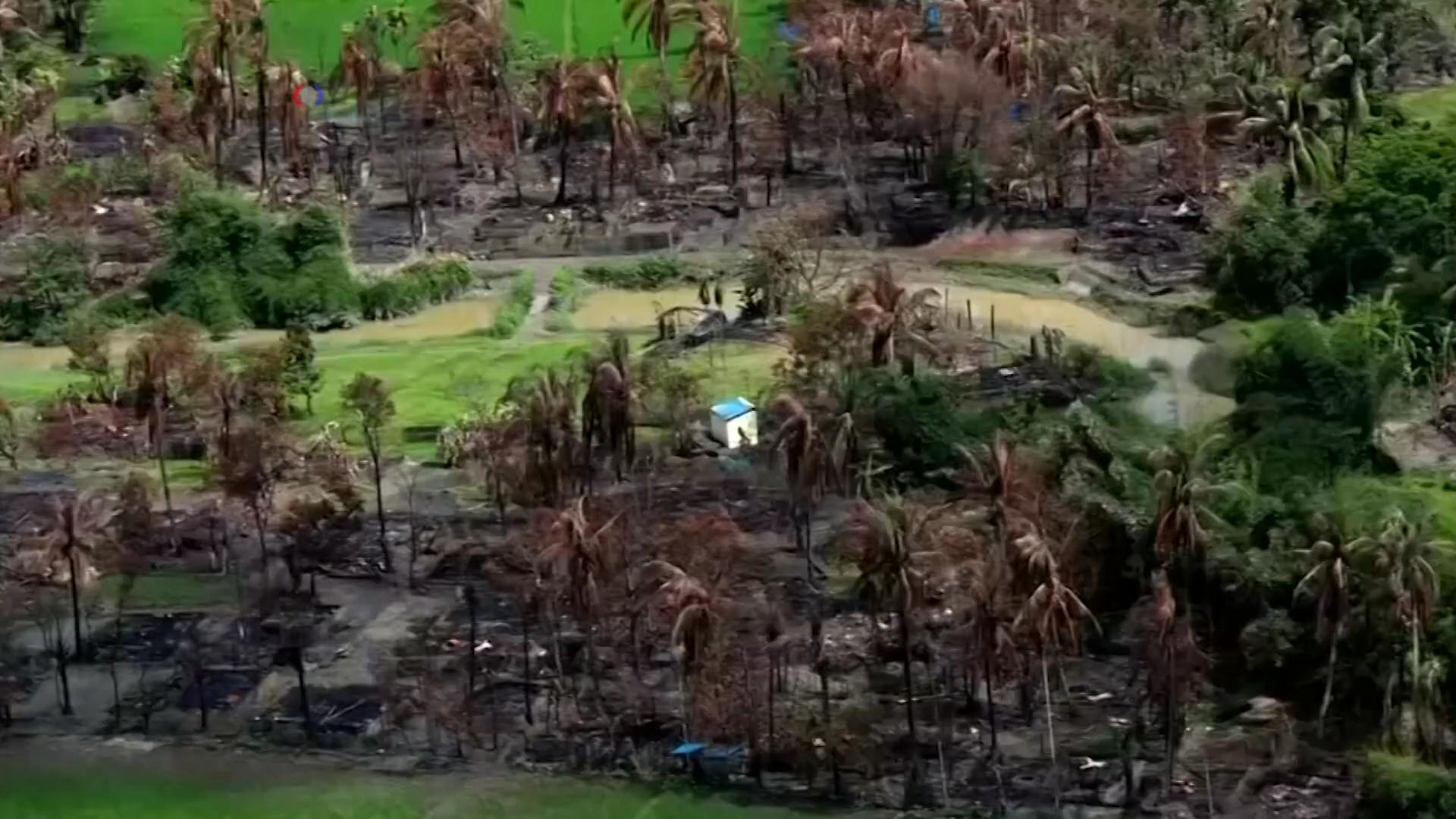
- Destroyed village in Rakhine State, September 2017
- Location: Rakhine State, Myanmar
- Date: 9 October 2016 – January 2017; 25 August 2017 – present
- Target: Rohingya and other Muslim minorities
- Attack type: Genocide; Ethnic cleansing; Religious cleansing; Genocidal rape; Mass murder; Mass killing
- Deaths: c. 24,000-30,000
- Victims: Destruction of many villages; Tens of thousands raped; 1.5 million+ fled abroad (primarily to Bangladesh)
- Perpetrators: Myanmar; Tatmadaw
- Assailants: Arakan Army; 969 Movement
- Motive: Anti-Rohingya sentiment; Islamophobia
- Litigation: Rohingya genocide case

The Rohingya genocide is an ongoing series of killings and persecutions of the Muslim Rohingya people by the Tatmadaw armed forces of Myanmar. The genocide has consisted of two phases: an initial military crackdown from October 2016 to January 2017, and a renewed persecution from August 2017. From 2024 onward, the rebel Arakan Army has also been accused of participating in abuses against Rohingya Muslims, particularly in areas under its control. The crisis forced over a million Rohingya to flee to other countries, most to Bangladesh, where they are housed in the world's largest refugee camp. Others fled to India, Thailand, Malaysia, and other parts of South and Southeast Asia, where they continue to face persecution. Several countries consider these events to be ethnic cleansing.

The persecution of Rohingya Muslims in Myanmar dates back to at least the 1970s. Since then, the Rohingya people have been persecuted on a regular basis by the government and Buddhist nationalists. In late 2016, Myanmar's armed forces and police launched a major crackdown against the people in Rakhine State in Myanmar's northwestern region. The Burmese military was accused of committing ethnic cleansing and genocide by various United Nations (UN) agencies, International Criminal Court (ICC) officials, human rights groups, journalists, and governments. The UN found evidence of wide-scale human rights violations, including extrajudicial killings; summary executions; gang rapes; arson of Rohingya villages, businesses, and schools; and infanticides. At least 6,700 Rohingya were killed in the first month of attacks, between 25 August and 24 September 2017. The government of Myanmar dismissed these findings as "exaggerations". Using statistical extrapolations which were based on surveys which were conducted with a total of 3,321 Rohingya refugee households in Cox's Bazar, Bangladesh, a study which was conducted in January 2018 estimated that the military and the local Rakhine population killed at least 25,000 Rohingya people and perpetrated gang rapes and other forms of sexual violence against 18,000 Rohingya women and girls. They estimated that 116,000 Rohingya were beaten, and 36,000 were thrown into fires and burned alive.

The military operations displaced a large number of people, triggering a refugee crisis. The largest wave of Rohingya refugees fled from Myanmar in 2017, resulting in the largest human exodus in Asia since the Indochina refugee crisis after the Vietnam War. According to UN reports, over 700,000 people fled or were driven out of Rakhine State, and took shelter in neighbouring Bangladesh as refugees as of September 2018. In December 2017, two Reuters journalists who were covering the Inn Din massacre were arrested and imprisoned. Foreign Secretary Myint Thu told reporters Myanmar was prepared to accept 2,000 Rohingya refugees from camps in Bangladesh in November 2018. Subsequently, in November 2017, the governments of Bangladesh and Myanmar signed a deal to facilitate the return of Rohingya refugees to Rakhine State within two months, which drew mixed responses from international onlookers. The UN High Commissioner for Human Rights, Michelle Bachelet, visited Bangladesh and the Rohingya camps near the border with Myanmar in early August 2022. Reports covered that Bangladesh's Prime Minister, Sheikh Hasina, asked the refugees to return to Myanmar. However, the UN stated that repatriation must be voluntary and dignified and only when the conditions on the border and in Myanmar are safe for the process. In late August 2022, the UN special envoy held another discussion with Bangladesh leaders, acknowledging the major pressures as a host country. At the same time, the UN emphasized the importance of engaging the Rohingya in direct discussions and decision-making processes about their future and for minimizing marginalization.

The 2016 military crackdown on the Rohingya people was condemned by the UN (which cited possible "crimes against humanity"), Amnesty International, the U.S. Department of State, and the governments of Bangladesh and Malaysia. The Burmese leader and State Counsellor (de facto head of government) and Nobel Peace Prize laureate Aung San Suu Kyi was criticised for her inaction and silence over the issue and did little to prevent military abuses. Myanmar also drew criticism for prosecuting journalists under her leadership.

The August 2017 persecution was launched in response to Arakan Rohingya Salvation Army attacks on Myanmar border posts. It has been labelled ethnic cleansing and genocide by various UN agencies, ICC officials, human rights groups, and governments. The UN described the persecution as "a textbook example of ethnic cleansing". In late September 2017, a seven-member panel of the Permanent Peoples' Tribunal found the Burmese military and authorities guilty of genocide against the Rohingya and the Kachin minority groups. Again, Suu Kyi was criticised for her silence over the issue, and for supporting the military's actions. In August 2018, the office of the UN High Commissioner for Human Rights declared that Burmese military generals should be tried for genocide. On 23 January 2020, the International Court of Justice (ICJ) ordered Myanmar to prevent genocidal violence against its Rohingya minority and to preserve evidence of past attacks.

In November 2026, the ICJ found that Myanmar committed genocide against the Rohingya population, marking the first time a state has ever been found guilty by an international court of committing genocide.

== Background ==
Location of Rakhine State in Myanmar

The Rohingya people have been described as "amongst the world's least wanted" and "one of the world's most persecuted minorities" by the UN. The Rohingya are deprived of the right to move freely as well as the right to receive a higher education. They have officially been denied Burmese citizenship since 1982 when the Burmese nationality law was enacted. However, the persecution and marginalization of them predate the passage of this law (which only formalised the legal discrimination against them) which included the denial of their right to receive all essential services and means of support. They are not allowed to travel without official permission. Previously, they were required to sign a commitment not to have more than two children; however, this law was not strictly enforced. They may be subjected to routine forced labour, during which a Rohingya man will typically have to give up one day a week to work on military or government projects and give up one night a week to perform sentry duty. The Rohingya have also lost much of their arable land to the military; land was later distributed to Buddhist settlers who have migrated there from other regions of Myanmar.

Myanmar, also known as Burma, is a country in Southeast Asia, bounded by the Bay of Bengal, Bangladesh, and India to the west, and China, Laos and Thailand to the east. Democracy has only existed in Myanmar since 2011 when the country's military made an arrangement with the opposition, under which a free election was permitted to be held on 8 November 2015. Nobel Peace Prize laureate Aung San Suu Kyi was promoted to the State Counsellor of Myanmar after having spent years under house arrest.

Myanmar's population is predominantly Buddhist (88–90%), with small minority groups whose members practice other faiths, including a small Muslim minority (4%).

The population of the western coastal province of Rakhine State is predominantly Buddhist Rakhine (4% of Myanmar's total population, about 2 million people) while the Rohingya (2% of Myanmar's total population, about 1 million people) are predominantly Muslim. Tensions between Buddhist and Muslim communities have frequently led to violence in Rakhine State, with Buddhist nationalists often targeting Rohingyas. The Rohingya are a distinct ethnicity with their own language and culture, but claim to have a long historical connection to Rakhine State.

The origins of the Rohingya people remains controversial. The Rohingya claim to be the descendants of Arab traders, who settled in the region many generations ago. Although Muslim settlements have existed for a long time in Arakan, the original settlers before the British rule are generally assumed to be few. After four decades of British rule in 1869, Muslim settlers reached 5% of Arakan's population. The number steadily increased until World War II. Some scholars stated that they have been present in the region since the 15th century while others argue that, although a few Rohingya trace their ancestry to Muslims who lived in Arakan during the 15th and 16th centuries, most Rohingyas arrived in the region when Arakan was under the British rule during the 19th and 20th centuries.

British policy encouraged Bengali inhabitants from adjacent regions to migrate into the then lightly populated and fertile valleys of Arakan as farm laborers. The East India Company extended the Bengal Presidency to Arakan. There was no international boundary between Bengal and Arakan and no restrictions on migration between the regions. In the early 19th century, thousands of Bengalis from the Chittagong region settled in Arakan seeking work. Many have argued that Rohingya existed from the four waves of Muslim migrations from the ancient times to medieval, to the British colonial period. Gutman (1976) and Ibrahim (2016) claim that the Muslim population dates to before the arrival of ethnic Rakhine in the 9th to 10th centuries; suggesting the Rohingya are descendants of a pre-Arakan population who existed for 3,000 years, and waves of Muslim who intermingled with them, forming the modern Rohingya. The Rohingya have been denied citizenship by the government of Myanmar, who considers them illegal immigrants from Bangladesh.

== 2016 Rohingya persecution ==
=== Events leading up to the 2016 persecution ===
The persecution of Rohingya Muslims in Myanmar dates back to the 1970s. Since then, the Rohingya people have been persecuted on a regular basis by the government and Buddhist nationalists. The tensions between the various religious groups in the country were often exploited by past military rulers of Myanmar. Amnesty International notes that the Rohingya were victims of human rights violations which were committed against them during the rule of past military dictatorships since 1978, and many of them have fled to neighbouring Bangladesh as a result. In 2005, the United Nations High Commissioner for Refugees assisted with the repatriation of Rohingyas from Bangladesh, but allegations of human rights abuses in the refugee camps threatened this effort. In 2015, 140,000 Rohingyas remained in IDP (Internally Displaced Persons) camps after communal riots in 2012.

In 2015, the Allard K. Lowenstein International Human Rights Clinic at Yale Law School found "strong evidence that genocide is being committed against Rohingya." After eight months of analysing whether the persecution of the Rohingya in Rakhine State satisfied the criteria for genocide, the study found that the Burmese government, with the help of extremist Buddhist monks, was responsible for ethnic cleansing and genocide against the Rohingya.

Before the most recent outbreak of violence, in its 17 March 2016 Atrocities Prevention Report, the U.S. Department of State summarised:

The situation in Rakhine State is grim, in part due to a mix of long-term historical tensions between the Rakhine and Rohingya communities, socio-political conflict, socio-economic underdevelopment, and a long-standing marginalisation of both Rakhine and Rohingya by the Government of Burma. The World Bank estimates Rakhine State has the highest poverty rate in Burma (78 per cent) and it is the poorest state in the country as a result. The lack of investment by the central government has resulted in poor infrastructure and inferior social services, while the lack of the rule of law has led to inadequate security conditions. In particular, members of the Rohingya community are reportedly subjected to human rights abuses which are committed against them by the Government of Burma, abuses which include torture, unlawful arrest and detention, restricted movement, restrictions on religious practice, and discrimination in employment and access to social services. In 2012, the intercommunal conflict led to the death of nearly 200 Rohingya and the displacement of 140,000 people. Throughout 2013–2015, isolated incidents of violence against Rohingya individuals continued to take place.

=== Initial border incidents ===
According to Myanmar state reports, on 9 October 2016, armed individuals attacked several border police posts in Rakhine State and left nine police personnel dead. Weapons and ammunition were also looted. The attack took place mainly in Maungdaw Township. A newly formed insurgent group, Harakah al-Yaqin, claimed responsibility a week later.

=== Crackdown ===
Following the border post incidents, the Burmese military began a major crackdown in the villages of northern Rakhine State. In the initial operation, dozens of people were killed, and many were arrested. Casualties increased as the crackdown continued. Arbitrary arrest, extrajudicial killings, gang rapes, brutalities against civilians, and looting were carried out. Media reports stated hundreds of Rohingya people had been killed by December 2016, and many had fled Myanmar as refugees to take shelter in the nearby areas of Bangladesh. Hindus and other non-Muslims in northern Rakhine at the time of the crackdown had accused ARSA members of driving out or killing residents in their villages.

In late November, Human Rights Watch released satellite images which showed about 1,250 Rohingya houses in five villages burned down by security forces. The media and human rights groups frequently reported intense human rights violations by the Burmese military. During one incident in November, the Myanmar military used helicopter gunships to shoot and kill villagers. As of November 2016, Myanmar has yet to allow the media and human rights groups to enter the persecuted areas. Consequently, the exact figures of civilian casualties remain unknown. Rakhine State was termed an "information black hole".

Those who fled Myanmar to escape persecution reported that women had been gang raped, men were killed, houses were torched, and young children were thrown into burning houses. Boats carrying Rohingya refugees on the Naf River were often gunned down by the Burmese military.

On 3 February 2017, the Office of the United Nations High Commissioner for Human Rights (OHCHR) released a report based on interviews with more than 200 Rohingya refugees, which said that the abuses included gang-rape, mass killing, and killing children. Nearly half of the interviewees stated that family members of theirs had been killed. Half of the women interviewed stated that they had been raped or sexually assaulted: the report described the sexual violence as "massive and systematic". The army and police were alleged to have burned "homes, schools, markets, shops, and mosques" belonging to or used by the Rohingya people.

In March 2017, a police document obtained by Reuters listed 423 Rohingyas detained by the police since 9 October 2016, 13 of whom were children, the youngest being ten years old. Two police captains in Maungdaw verified the document and justified the arrests; one of them said, "We the police have to arrest those who collaborated with the attackers, children or not, but the court will decide if they are guilty; we are not the ones who decide." Burmese police also claimed that the children had confessed to their alleged crimes during interrogations and that they were not beaten or pressured during questioning. The average age of those detained is 34, the youngest is 10, and the oldest is 75.

On 24 October 2018, Marzuki Darusman, chairman of the Independent International Fact-Finding Mission on Myanmar, reported examples of atrocities committed by Myanmar security forces against Rohingya Muslims. This Independent International Fact-Finding Mission was established in 2017 by the UN Human Rights Council in Geneva.

=== Dissemination of hate material ===
In a report which was published in March 2024, the IIMM stated that in a "systematic and coordinated" manner "the military had spread material which was designed to instill fear and hatred of the Rohingya minority". The report stated that the military used dozens of seemingly unrelated Facebook pages to spread hate speech against the Rohingya before it launched its attacks on them in 2017.

== 2017–present: Rohingya genocide ==
=== Spillover into the 2017–2023 genocide ===
In January 2017, at least four police officers were detained by government authorities after a video was posted online of security forces beating Rohingya Muslims in November 2016. In the video, Rohingya men and boys were forced to sit in rows with their hands behind their head while they were beaten with batons and kicked. This was the first incident in which the government punished its own security forces in the region since the beginning of the crackdown.

On 21 January 2017, the bodies of three Rohingya men were found in shallow graves in Maungdaw. They were locals who had worked closely with the local administration, and the government believed they were murdered by Rohingya insurgents in a reprisal attack.

On 4 July 2017, a mob of at least a hundred Rakhine Buddhists in Sittwe attacked seven Rohingya men from the Dapaing camp for internally displaced persons with bricks, killing one and severely injuring another. The Rohingya men were being escorted by police to Sittwe's docks to purchase boats, but were attacked despite armed guards being present nearby. A spokesman for the Burmese Ministry of Home Affairs said that an unarmed junior policeman was with the Rohingya men at the time of the attack, but was unable to stop the attackers. On 26 July 2017 a man was arrested in relation to the attacks.

On 30 July 2017, packages of high energy biscuits gifted from the United Nations World Food Programme (WFP) as aid were discovered in a terrorist hideout in the Mayu mountain range in Maungdaw Township. The Rakhine State Government and WFP investigated on the pretense of misuse of food assistance. On 31 July 2017, three decapitated bodies were found in Rathedaung Township. A government official asserted they were murdered by Rohingya insurgents. On 3 August 2017, six Mro farmers were found killed in Maungdaw Township, supposedly as the work of Muslim militants.

On 25 August 2017, the Myanmar government announced that 71 people (one soldier, one immigration officer, 10 policemen and 59 insurgents) had been killed overnight during coordinated attacks by up to 150 insurgents across 24 police posts and the 552nd Light Infantry Battalion army base in Rakhine State. The Myanmar Army stated that the attack began around 1:00 AM, when insurgents armed with bombs, small arms weapons, and machetes blew up a bridge. It went on to say that a majority of the attacks occurred around 3:00 AM to 4:00 AM. The Arakan Rohingya Salvation Army (ARSA) claimed they were taking "defensive actions" in 25 different locations and accused government soldiers of raping and killing civilians. The group also claimed that Rathedaung had been under a blockade for more than two weeks, starving the Rohingya, and that the government forces were preparing to do the same in Maungdaw.

Burmese government and military reports sought to highlight the suffering of other ethnic groups such as Rakhine Buddhists and Hindus at the hands of Rohingya militants. In August 2017, up to 99 Hindus were killed by ARSA according to Amnesty International. Hindus and other non-Muslims in northern Rakhine at the time of the Myanmar army crackdown accused ARSA members of killing residents or burning homes in their villages, with Radio Free Asia reporting more than 1,200 Hindus had fled to refugee camps in Maungdaw and Sittwe due to ARSA violence. Hindu refugees and the Myanmar government alleged that Rohingya militants forced remaining Hindu women to convert to Islam and took them to Bangladesh. ARSA has also been responsible for killings of fellow Rohingyas in Bangladeshi refugee camps.

Yanghee Lee, the United Nations Special Rapporteur on Human Rights for Myanmar reports at least 1,000 people had been killed in the violence since 25 August. She added that the figure is "very likely an underestimate". She also downplayed the chance that Myanmar generals will ever see the inside of the International Criminal Court due to ''powerful international defenders.''

In October 2018, Lee reported that Suu Kyi denied the allegations. Suu Kyi's government denied "independent international investigations" and probes. Lee has described the situation as 'apartheid' with detained Rohingyas segregated from the 'Rakhine ethnic community' and without 'freedom of movement'.

On 23 April 2019, a Burmese gunship strafed the Rohingya village of Buthidaung. The military subsequently planted internationally banned landmines along northern Rakhine state to prevent the Rohingya from escaping northwest to Bangladesh. Burmese soldiers allegedly gunned down Rohingya civilians fleeing south. Those that remained were allegedly targeted by aerial attacks. Some have described the Rohingya as being trapped in a "genocide zone".

In November 2019, the Three Brotherhood Alliance coalition of ethnic rebels in Myanmar issued a statement welcoming efforts by the international community to punish their country's junta through legal processes for alleged genocide against ethnic minority groups including the Rohingya.

In early April 2020, the government of Myanmar released two presidential directives: Directive No. 1/2020 and Directive No. 2/2020. They were released after the January orders issued by ICJ for the government and military to stop genocide against the Rohingya Muslim ethnic group. Directive No. 1/2020 legislates that the answerable authorities are liable to ensure anyone under their control do not commit activities that lead up to a genocide. Directive No. 2/2020 restrains all Ministries and the government of Rakhine State from destroying The ICJ's January order and also mandated the preservation of evidence of any criminal activity that can possibly build up to a genocide.

=== 2024–present ===
Starting in 2024, increased fighting between the Arakan Army (AA) and the Tatmadaw across northern Rakhine State has also led to the former committing war crimes against the Rohingya. The AA's military campaigns have intensified, particularly in Maungdaw and Buthidaung townships, leading to significant civilian casualties and mass displacements. On August 5, 2024, the AA reportedly conducted drone and artillery attacks along the Naf River around Maungdaw District, resulting in over 200 Rohingya deaths. Eyewitnesses described indiscriminate shelling against civilians in the region.

According to an investigation by Human Rights Watch, in May 2024, the Arakan Army massacred at least 170 Rohingya villagers in Hoyyar Siri of Buthidaung Township during the clashes with the AA and the Tatmadaw. By May 2024, the United Nations estimated that approximately 45,000 Rohingya had fled the intensified fighting, seeking shelter near the Bangladesh border.

On 3 August 2025, the Arakan Rohingya National Council published photos showing human remains from a massacre allegedly committed by AA against at least 600 Rohingya in Htan Shauk Khan village, Buthidaung Township, on 2 May 2024. During a ULA press conference, Khaing Thu Kha denied AA's responsibility and claimed that the allegations were part of a smear campaign. He further stated that the remains belonged to Tatmadaw soldiers and Muslim conscripts as military headwear and boots were present in the photos. Tatmadaw spokesperson, Zaw Min Tun, claimed that no soldiers were in the area of the massacre. Aung Thaung Shwe, a former Arakan National Party Pyithu Hluttaw representative for Buthidaung constituency and the chief administrator under the ULA/AA, rebutted the military's statements by asserting that the village was close to the 551st battalion base; heavy fighting supposedly occurred near the area during that time. However, the Rohingya news organisation, Kaladan Press claimed that AA fighters massacred Rohingya villagers on the order of an officer after they handed over two Tatmadaw soldiers, and kept women as sex slaves in the LIB 551 base.

Human rights organizations have accused the AA of committing war crimes, including forced displacement, arbitrary detentions, and targeting civilians. In January 2025, reports emerged of the AA forcibly removing Rohingya residents from their homes in Buthidaung, leaving them without food or water for an entire day during interrogations.

The AA has denied allegations of forced conscription of Rohingya men into their ranks, asserting that their military comprises voluntary recruits and that they provide security and aid to displaced Muslims in their controlled areas.

By 2025, further allegations suggest that the Arakan Army is imposing financial penalties on Rohingya residents for basic movements, such as traveling between villages or going to local markets. In some cases, payments ranging from two to ten thousand Myanmar kyat are reportedly required. Some Rohingya have also alleged that the AA has deliberately encouraged or facilitated their departure to Bangladesh, sometimes in exchange for payments ranging from 300,000 to 500,000 kyat, allowing them to cross the border.

On 14 May 2026, the Burmese Rohingya Organisation UK released a briefing alleging an increase in sexual violence against Rohingya women and girls by the Arakan Army in their controlled areas. The report states that abuses, including rape, gangrape, threats of sexual violence, arbitrary detention, and incommunicado confinement, have occurred during recruitment raids and other operations by the AA. The organization added that more than 150,000 Rohingya have fled to Bangladesh since late 2023, while the UN High Commissioner for Refugees has described the Andaman Sea as an "unmarked grave" for Rohingya refugees.

== Persecution and crackdown ==
After the attack on security forces, the Myanmar military responded with a "heavy counter-offensive" and started "clearance operations" against the Rohingya people with the help of the Buddhist militia. In the first week, at least 130 Rohingya people were killed. The Rohingya people started fleeing Myanmar in large numbers and tried to take shelter in Bangladesh. The Myanmar military often opened fire with mortar shells and machine-guns on the fleeing Rohingya, and dead bodies of many Rohingya people began to be washed ashore from the drowned boats as they attempted to cross the Naf River to enter Bangladesh. By the second week, at least 1,000 Rohingya were killed.

The Rohingya group Arakan Rohingya Society for Peace and Human Rights, established by slain Rohingya activist Mohib Ullah, began documenting evidence of the atrocities committed in Myanmar in August 2017, after their founding members fled Myanmar and arrived in Cox's Bazar, Bangladesh. The organisation went door to door in the camp, collecting information about the number of people in each household that had been killed, injured, or raped; which houses had burnt down; and other eyewitness accounts of crimes committed across Rakhine state in 2016 and 2017. The documentation they have collected to date includes information from over 3,000 witnesses to various serious international crimes.

=== Massacres and killings ===
Four captured Myanmar Army soldiers, who eventually defected to Arakan Army, confess to involvement in massacres targeting Rohingya Muslims in 2017 (28 May 2020)

In August 2018, a study estimated that more than 24,000 Rohingya people were killed by the Burmese military and local Buddhists since the "clearance operations" which had started on 25 August 2017. The study also estimated that over 18,000 Rohingya Muslim women and girls were raped, 116,000 Rohingyans were beaten, and 36,000 Rohingyans were thrown into fires. It was also reported that at least 6,700 to 7,000 Rohingya people, including 730 children, were killed in the first month alone since the crackdown started. The majority of them died from gunshots while others were burned to death in their homes. The sources described their killings as "violent deaths". There were also reports of mass killings of Rohingyas by the military and Buddhist vigilantes in Chut Pyin village near Rathedaung. Chris Lewa, director of the Arakan Project stated that they had received reports of 130 being killed in the village. On 7 September 2017, The Guardian reported a mass killing of Rohingyas at the Tula Toli village and called it the Tula Toli massacre. According to the Arakan Project, evidence of likely mass graves was uncovered, including time stamped mobile phone metadata indicating an 27 August date.

In February 2018, Reuters reported a massacre event which occurred in Rakhine state's Inn Din village on 2 September 2017. This event is known as the Inn Din massacre. Ten Rohingya men, all of whom were captured from the Rohingya village of Inn Din, were killed by members of the Burmese army and Buddhist villagers who formed an "informal militia" to attack Rohingya villages. The victims were taken from hundreds of Rohingya villagers who gathered near a beach to seek safety. Reuters identified all ten victims: five of the men were fishermen, two were shopkeepers, one was an Islamic teacher, and the last two were high school students.

On 9 March 2024, a Myanmar Police Force artillery shell struck the Aung Mingalar district of Sittwe. Five Rohingya were killed, and ten (including children) were seriously injured.

On 5 August 2024, the Arakan Army attacked Rohingya civilians in Maungdaw Township, Rakhine State, killing 221. According to the Rohingya news group, Kaladan Press, the attack was possibly triggered by a large gathering of RSO fighters near the massacre area.

=== Burning and looting of villages ===
In September 2018, the U.N. Independent International Fact-Finding Mission on Myanmar released a report stating that at least 392 Rohingya villages in Rakhine State had been razed to the ground since 25 August 2017. Earlier, Human Rights Watch in December 2017 said it had found that 354 Rohingya villages in Rakhine state were burnt down and destroyed by the Myanmar military. These destructions included thousands of structures, mainly homes used by the Rohingya Muslims. Lewa blamed the security forces for burning village after village in a systematic way while also blaming Rohingya arsonists for burning the Buddhist village of Pyu Ma. A video provided to ABC News by a human rights monitor purportedly shows the village burning and in another clip of freshly dug earth mound, allegedly graves of those killed.

Before the Inn Din massacre in early September 2017, members of the Myanmar military and the Buddhist villagers of Inn Din looted the Rohingya hamlets in Inn Din and then burned down the Rohingya houses. Several Buddhist villagers later confessed to Reuters that they set fire to the Rohingya houses with kerosene and participated in the massacre on 2 September. The 33rd Light Infantry Division of the Myanmar Army, the 8th Security Police Battalion, and the Buddhist villagers took part in the looting, which included Rohingya property, goats, cows, cattle, and motorcycles. Thant Zin Oo, the commander of the 8th Battalion, later sold the cows and the cattle in exchange for money.

Rohingya from Buthidaung stated to NUG Deputy Human Rights Minister, Aung Kyaw Moe, that the Arakha Army had burnt down the town after telling them to leave on 17 May.

=== Gang rape and other forms of sexual violence ===
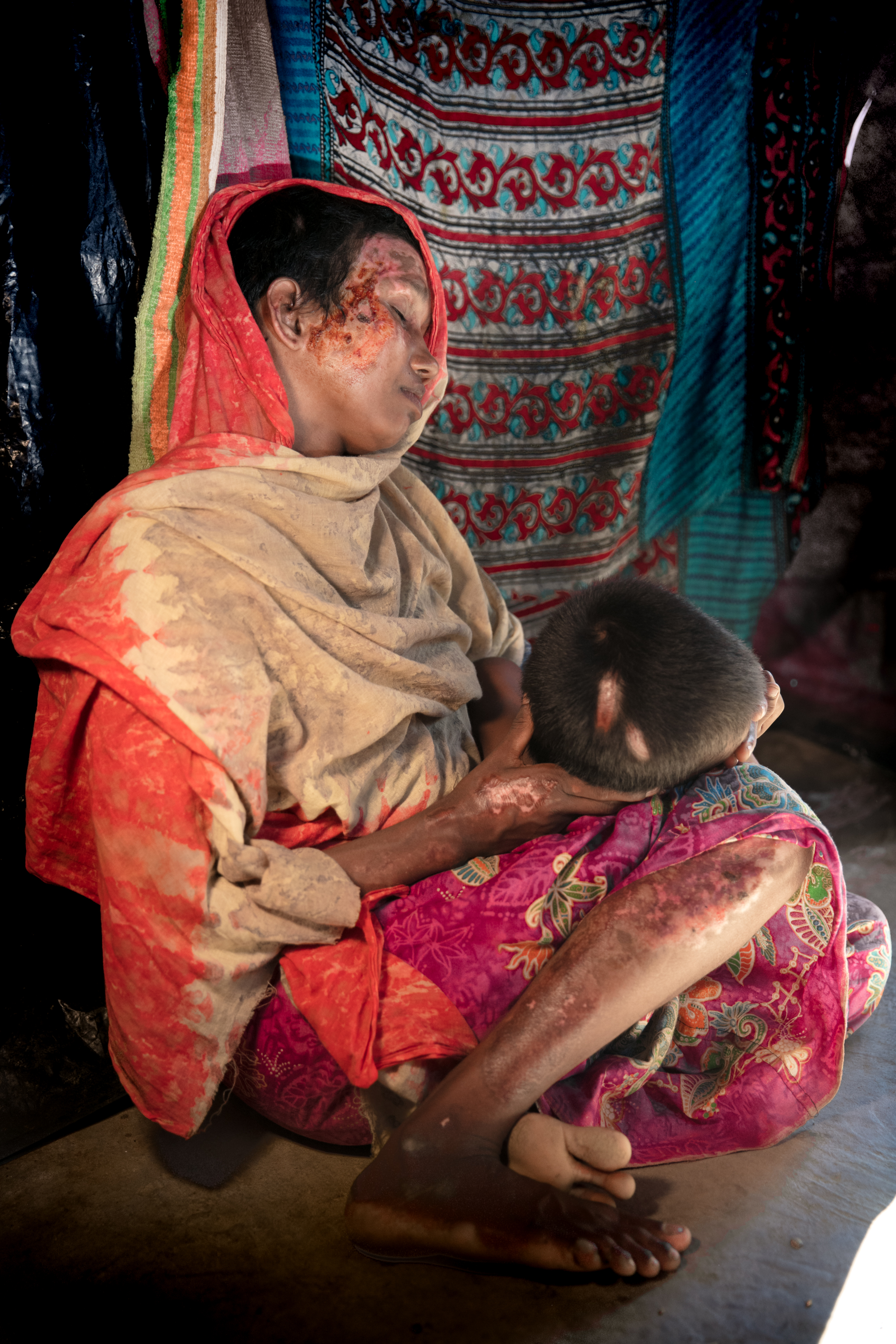
Rohingya woman, covered in bruises and burns; Tatmadaw troops dragged her into a house, raped her, and attempted to burn the house down whilst locking her inside.

In November 2017, both the UN officials and the Human Rights Watch reported that the Armed Forces of Myanmar had committed widespread gang rapes and other forms of sexual violence against the Rohingya Muslim women and girls for the prior three months. Alongside the Armed Forces, the Myanmar Border Guard Police and Buddhist militias of Rakhine were also involved in these atrocities. HRW stated that the gang rapes and sexual violence were committed as part of the military's ethnic cleansing campaign while Pramila Patten, the United Nations Special Representative of the Secretary General on Sexual Violence in Conflict, said that the Rohingya women and girls were made the "systematic" target of rapes and sexual violence because of their ethnic identity and religion. Other forms of sexual violence included sexual slavery in military captivity, forced public nudity, and humiliation. Some women and girls were raped to death while others were found traumatised with raw wounds after they had arrived in refugee camps in Bangladesh. Human Rights Watch reported of a 15-year-old Rohingya girl who was ruthlessly dragged on the ground for over 50 feet and then was raped by ten Burmese soldiers.

=== Destruction of evidence of crimes ===
In February 2018, it was reported that the Burmese military bulldozed and flattened the burnt Rohingya villages and mass graves in order to destroy the evidence of atrocities committed. These villages were inhabited by the Rohingya people before they were burnt down by the Burmese military during the 2017 crackdown. Some intact villages that lost their Rohingya inhabitants because of the military crackdown were also bulldozed.

=== Censorship and harassment of journalists ===
Since the 25 August incident, Myanmar has blocked media access and the visits of international bodies to Rakhine State. Near Rangoon on 12 December 2017, two Reuters journalists who had been covering the refugee story were charged and imprisoned by the police for violating a 1923 colonial law related to secrecy. On 1 February 2018, a Myanmar court denied bail for the two Reuters journalists. The UN Secretary-General António Guterres expressed his concern and called for the release of the two journalists, who were released on 7 May 2019 along with over 6,000 other prisoners in a presidential pardon.

=== Clearance operations ===
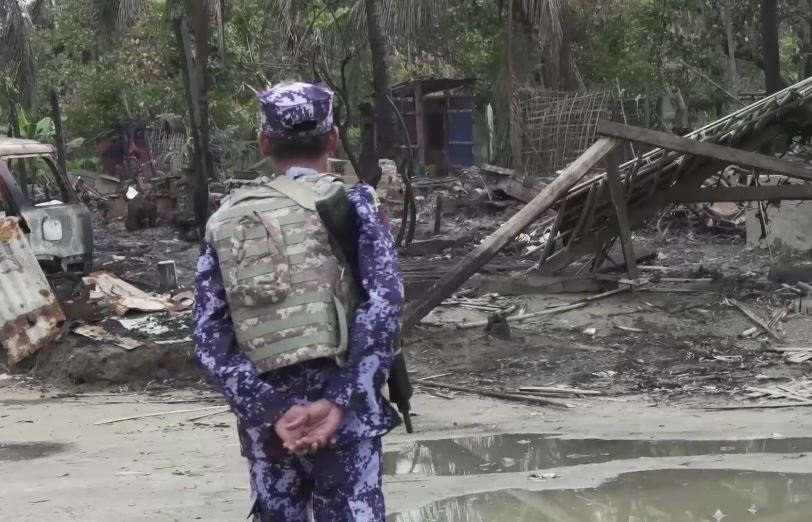
Myanmar security forces member near burnt down houses

According to the Mission report of OHCHR (released on 11 October 2017 by the United Nations Office of the High Commissioner for Human Rights), the Burmese military began a "systematic" process of driving hundreds of thousands of Rohingya from Myanmar in early August 2017. The report noted that "prior to the incidents and crackdown of 25 August, a strategy was pursued to":

- Arrest and arbitrarily detain male Rohingyas between the ages of 15–40 years;
- Arrest and arbitrarily detain Rohingya opinion-makers, leaders and cultural and religious personalities;
- Initiate acts to deprive Rohingya villagers of access to food, livelihoods and other means of conducting daily activities and life;
- Commit repeated acts of humiliation and violence prior to, during and after 25 August, to drive out Rohingya villagers en masse through incitement to hatred, violence, and killings, including by declaring the Rohingyas as Bengalis and illegal settlers in Myanmar;
- Instill deep and widespread fear and trauma – physical, emotional and psychological, in the Rohingya victims via acts of brutality, namely killings, disappearances, torture, and rape and other forms of sexual violence.

=== Conscription ===
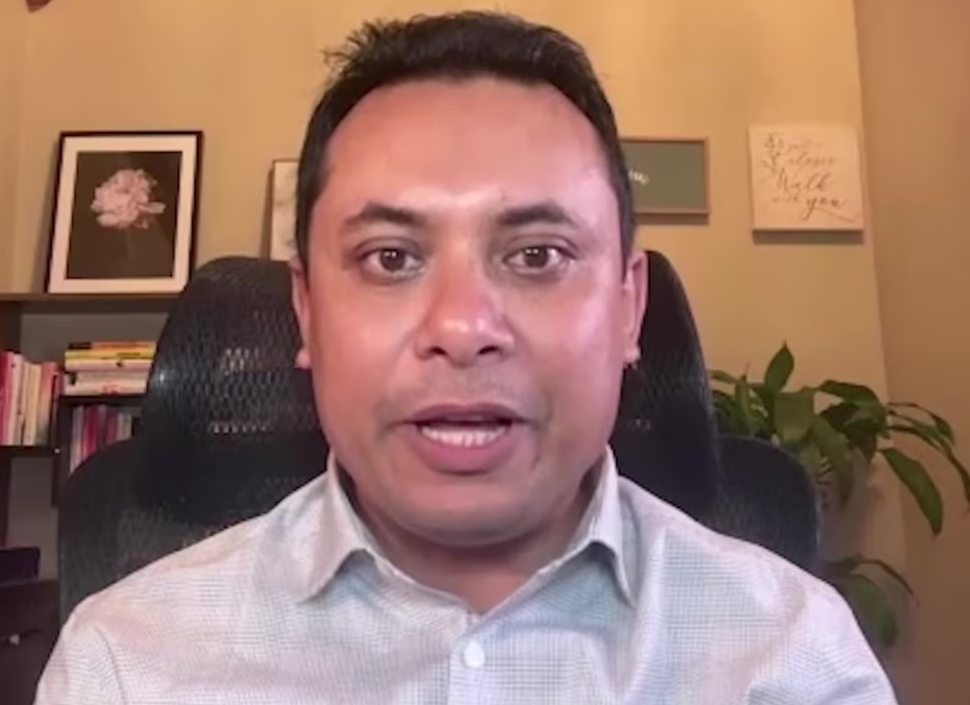
Aung Kyaw Moe, a Deputy Minister of Human Rights for the National Unity Government of Myanmar speaks with VOA about Rohingya conscription on March 8, 2024.

Since 10 February 2024, the Tatmadaw reportedly conscripted young Rohingya men between the ages of 18 and 35, despite the law only applying to citizens. Including 100 men from four villages in Buthidaung Township, they undergo 14 days of basic training while the junta promises them ID cards, a bag of rice, and a monthly salary of US$41. Those who refuse service are fined half a million kyats. The Tatmadaw also spreads anti-Rakhine messages to Rohingya conscripts under the guise of self-defense. Activists warned that the conscripts would be used as human shields. Many Rohingya who dodge the draft expressed their willingness to join the Arakan Army instead.

According to Rohingya activist and the Deputy Human Rights Minister of the National Unity Government, Aung Kyaw Moe, close to 100 Rohingya conscripts were killed in Sittwe. One body was handed over by the Tatmadaw to community leaders, with officials offering two bags of rice and a million kyat as compensation to families.

For Rohingya who are conscripted into the Tatmadaw, they face persecution via substandard medical care, extra duties compared to non-Rohingya soldiers, and being in the line of fire between other soldiers. Rohingya conscripts could not shoot weapons without an officer's permission.

== Refugee crisis ==
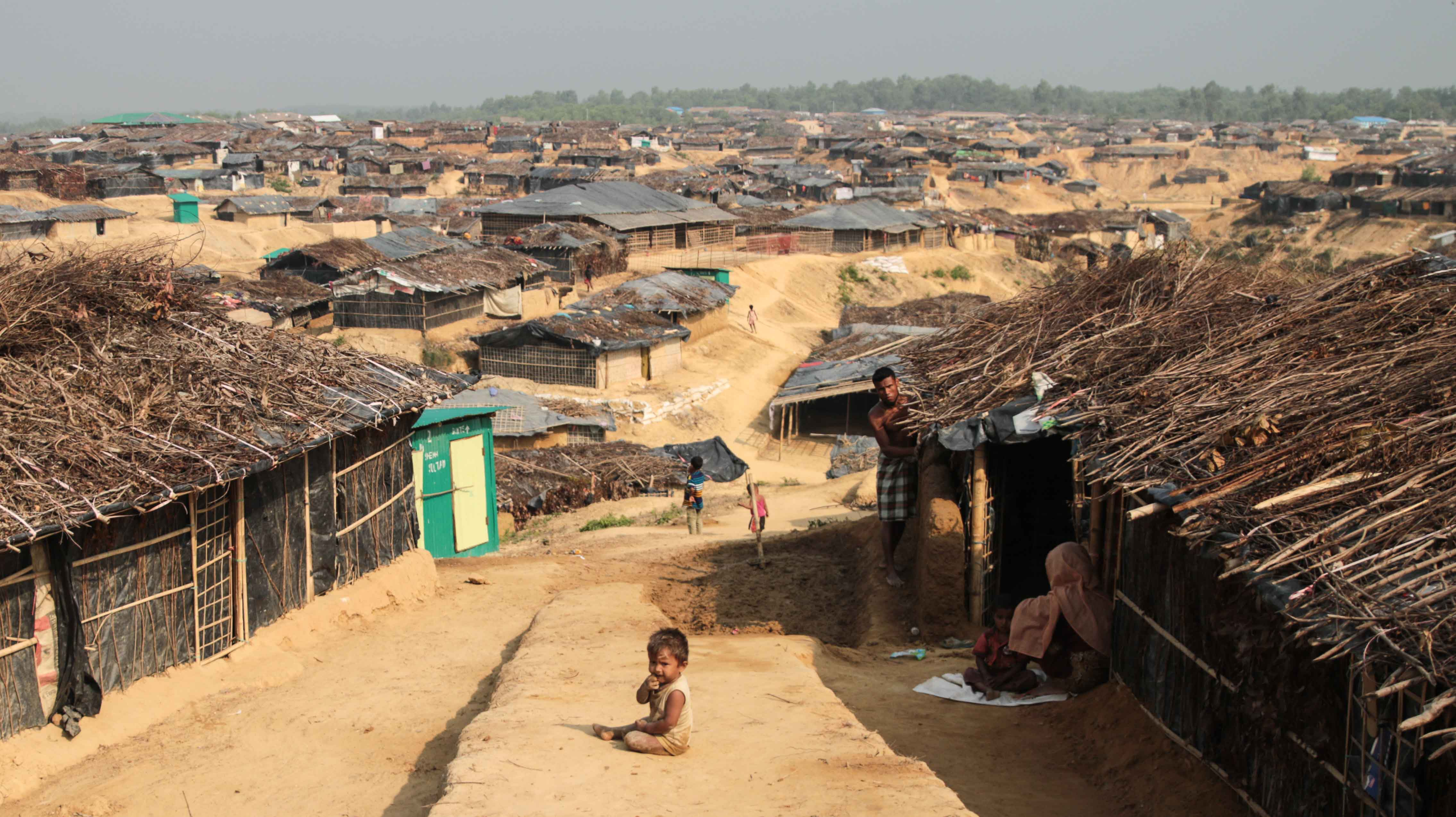
Kutupalong refugee camp in Bangladesh in March 2017

In 2017, the vast majority of Rohingya people were displaced and became refugees as a result of the genocide. At the peak of the crisis in the same year, over a million, in January alone some reports disclosed, 92,000 Rohingya people were forced to flee to other countries because of the violence. Most fled to Bangladesh while others escaped to India, Thailand, Malaysia, and other parts of South and Southeast Asia. It was estimated that around 650,000 Rohingya Muslims had fled Myanmar as of November 2017. The refugee crisis resulted in the largest human exodus in Asia since the Vietnam War. According to the United Nations reports, as of January 2018, nearly 690,000 Rohingya people had fled or had been driven out of Rakhine State who sought refuge in Bangladesh. Prior to this time, around 65,000 had fled from Myanmar to Bangladesh between October 2016 and January 2017, while 23,000 others had been internally displaced.

In February 2017, the government of Bangladesh announced that it planned to relocate the new refugees and another 232,000 Rohingya refugees already in the country to Bhasan Char, a sedimentary island in the Bay of Bengal. The island first appeared around 2007, formed from washed down silt from the Meghna River. The nearest inhabited land, Hatiya Island, is around 30 km away. News agencies quoted a regional official describing the plan as "terrible". The move received substantial opposition from a number of parties. Human rights groups have described the plan as a forced relocation. Additionally, concerns were raised over the living conditions on the island, which is low-lying and prone to flooding. The island has been described as "only accessible during winter and a haven for pirates". Bangladesh authorities have been accused of beating Rohingya who try to flee or protest their conditions in Bhasan Char.

In November 2017, Myanmar & Bangladesh announced a tentative deal to repatriate Rohingya refugees. The accord was viewed by international commentators as a conscious effort by Suu Kyi to address criticism over her lack of action in the conflict. This decision, coming after both the United Nations and Rex Tillerson, U.S. Secretary of State, declared that the actions undertaken by the Burmese army against the Rohingya refugees constituted ethnic cleansing, was met with hesitation and criticism by aid groups.

In August 2025, Bangladesh's Chief Adviser Muhammad Yunus declared that Bangladesh could no longer allocate additional resources for its 1.3 million Rohingya refugees and urged the international community to develop a practical roadmap for repatriation. Marking the eighth anniversary of the 2017 exodus, tens of thousands of Rohingya held protests in Cox's Bazar camps, carrying banners with slogans such as "No more refugee life," "Stop Genocide," and "Repatriation the ultimate solution."

=== Regional Responses ===
Various regions responded to the arrival of the refugees:

- On 30 April 2017 Sri Lanka intercepted and detained an Indian boat of 32 Rohingya refugees off its northern coast after it entered Sri Lankan waters.
- In May 2017, Bangladesh detained 12 Rohingya people and two smugglers who attempted to leave the country by boat for Malaysia.
- In August 2017, Thailand announced that it was "preparing to receive" Rohingya refugees fleeing Myanmar.
- On 14 August 2017 India announced that it was deporting an estimated 40,000 Rohingya refugees including 14,000 of those registered with the UN refugee agency as well. In the months leading up to the announcement, a string of anti-Rohingya protests took place in the country.
- In September 2017, Nepal increased surveillance at its border with India to prevent more Rohingya refugees from entering the country. A small community of Rohingya refugees live in the capital, Kathmandu.
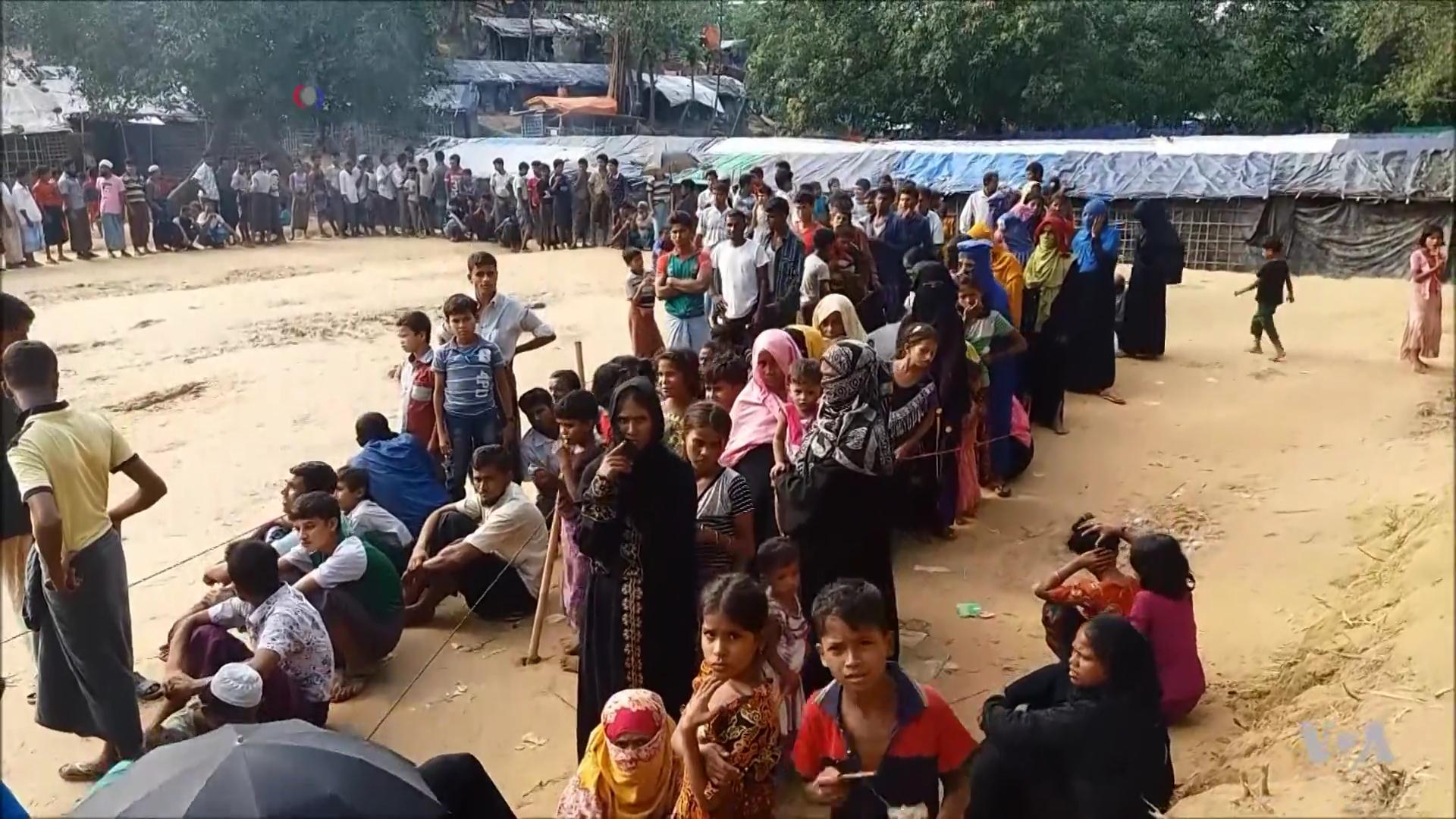
  Rohingya refugees in refugee camp in Bangladesh, 2017
- In November 2017, the government of Bangladesh signed a pact with Myanmar to return the Rohingya refugees to their homes in the Rakhine territory. The deal arose after a diplomatic meeting on the matter between Aung San Suu Kyi and Abul Hassan Mahmud Ali, the foreign minister of Bangladesh.
- In September 2024 around 8000 Rohingya fled to Bangladesh to escape violence western Rakhine state.
- On March 14, 2025, United Nations Secretary General António Guterres and Bangladesh's Chief Adviser, Muhammad Yunus visited the Rohingya refugee camps in Cox's Bazar. This visit was part of Guterres's annual Ramadan solidarity tour participating in iftar with approximately 100,000 Rohingya refugees.

== International reactions ==
International reaction focused on pressuring Aung San Suu Kyi to condemn the atrocities and address human-rights issues. Aung San Suu Kyi's power was restricted under the 2008 Constitution of Myanmar, which placed key ministries like home, border affairs and defense under military control and reserved 25% of seats in the legislature for serving military officers. Military dictator Min Aung Hlaing is regarded as the most powerful person in the country, and in 2021 he launched a military coup, seizing control of the government.

=== Supranational bodies: the UN and others ===
The Myanmar military's crackdown on the Rohingya people drew criticism from various parties. The human rights organization Amnesty International and organisations such as the United Nations have labelled the military's crackdown on the Rohingya minority a crime against humanity and they have also stated that the military has made the civilians the targets of "a systematic campaign of violence".

In particular, Aung San Suu Kyi has been criticized for her silence and her lack of action on the issue, and she has also been criticized for failing to prevent the military from committing human rights abuses. In response, she stated: "show me a country without human rights issues." The former head of the United Nations, Kofi Annan, after a week-long visit in the Rakhine state, expressed deep concern about reports of human rights violations in the area. He was leading a nine-member commission which was formed in August 2016 to look into and make recommendations on improving the situation in the state.

The U.S. Department of State expressed concern about the violence in Rakhine State and the displacement of Rohingyas. The government of Malaysia has condemned the crackdown in Rakhine State, with ongoing protests in the country. In a protest rally in early December, Malaysia's prime minister Najib Razak criticised the Myanmar authority for the military crackdown on Rohingya Muslims, and described the ongoing persecution as "genocide". Malaysia stated that the situation was of international concern and it also termed the violence against the Rohingya Muslim minority "ethnic cleansing". Malaysia also cancelled two football matches with Myanmar to protest the crackdown.

In November 2016, a senior United Nations official, John McKissick, accused Myanmar of conducting ethnic cleansing in the Rakhine state in order to free it from the Muslim minority. McKissick is the head of a UN refugee agency based in the Bangladeshi town Cox's Bazar. Later that month, Bangladesh summoned the Myanmar envoy in its country to express "tremendous concern" over the Rohingya persecution.

In December 2016, the United Nations strongly criticised the Myanmar government for its poor treatment of the Rohingya people, and it called its approach "callous". The United Nations also called on Aung San Suu Kyi to take steps to stop violence against the Rohingyas. In its report released in February 2017, the UN stated that the persecution of the Rohingya included serious human rights violations. The UN Human Rights Commissioner Zeid Raad Al Hussein stated "The cruelty to which these Rohingya children have been subjected to is unbearable—what kind of hatred could make a man stab a baby who was crying out for his mother's milk?" A spokesperson for the government stated that the allegations were very serious, and they would be investigated.

On 23 May 2017, the Myanmar military released a report rejecting the allegations made by the OHCHR in February, stating that "[o]ut of 18 accusations included in the OHCHR report, 12 were found to be incorrect, with the remaining six accusations found to be false and fabricated accusations based on lies and invented statements."

In December 2017, a coalition of 69 human rights non-governmental organisations appointed an Independent Fact-Finding Mission team, including Amnesty International and the Human Rights Watch, and called upon the UN Security Council to take "immediate action" in response to the humanitarian crisis by exploring "all avenues for justice and accountability, including through international courts". The coalition also called for arms embargoes and targeted sanctions.

The distinct OHCHR-appointed Independent Fact-Finding Mission 2018 Report similarly recommended that the UN Security Council issue a Chapter VII referral to the International Criminal Court, or, in the alternative, establishes an ad hoc international criminal tribunal. They also recommended: "enhanced monitoring, documentation, analysis and public reporting on the situation of human rights", the allocation of appropriate resources, repatriation "only when safe, voluntary and dignified with explicit human rights protections in place", termination of operational support for Tatmadaw until the genuine commitment to reform and cooperation is secured, and the establishment of a trust fund for victims.

The Washington-based Public International Law & Policy Group concluded in their December 2018 report, based on more than 1,000 interviews with Rohingya refugees, that there are "reasonable grounds" to believe that crimes against humanity, war crimes, and genocide have been committed by the Tatmadaw against the Rohingya population. In turn, they recommended "that a criminal tribunal should be established or granted jurisdiction to further investigate international crimes committed in Rakhine State and prosecute those responsible" and "the urgent establishment of an accountability mechanism or an immediate referral of the situation to the ICC."

Although Japan has given support to Myanmar's government over the genocide accusations, it has also pledged in June 2023 to offer around $2.9 million in aid to the United Nations High Commissioner for Refugees for Rohingya refugees in Bangladesh.

=== National and international media coverage ===
==== Myanmar ====
The Myanmar government instructed media sources to not include issues regarding the Rohingya in 2014. Specifically, the editor in chief of the Myanmar Times sent a memo to his editorial team stating:

... no material is to be run in any of our newspapers with regard to the Rohingya, Bengalis, Muslims and Buddhists and the ongoing issues in Rakhine without direct approval from my desk ... Our coverage is unlikely to matter substantively in the scheme of things and there appears little sense in placing our heads on the block right at this time ...

According to Irrawaddy founder Aung Zaw in 2015, Burmese reporters were told by their editors to use caution or ignore the Rohingya issue when reporting. Zaw attributes the self-censorship to potential international backlash Myanmar may face when reporting on the Rohingya. The Rakhine authorities have secluded the Rohingya as much as possible from Myanmar society and from international visitors. Rohingya known to have spoken to UN Special Rapporteurs or journalists have been arrested and/or beaten for giving their accounts.

The Irrawaddy itself was accused of fuelling anti-Rohingya sentiment in 2017. Myanmar-based Rohingya activist Nay San Lwin noted in the same year that all local media outlets including Burmese-language versions of BBC, VOA and RFA adopted a bias in favour of the military after the 2012 Rakhine State riots.

==== Other countries ====
Coverage on the Rohingya crisis in different countries is reported on in different ways. Md Khadimul Islam at the University of Mississippi qualitatively examined 50 news reports and quantitatively examined 258 news reports of Bangladesh, India and China. Islam found that news reports from India and Bangladesh focused on the "human interest and protest frame,"¹ while Chinese media focused on security and conflict of the Rohingya with Myanmar government officials being cited most in their reports.

According to Islam's study, the human interest frame was the most frequent frame as it had 28% of news reports. This indicates that the stories put a human face on the problem the most and described the Myanmar army's brutal action prominently. The second most frequent frame is protest with 22.2%, focusing primarily on protest and criticism of the Myanmar government for its actions against Rohingyas. Focusing on different aspects of aid including calling for aid and providing shelter, roughly 21.5% of news reports used the aid frame. "The frequency of use of security frame in articles is 11.6% and conflict is 7.5%. Only 2% of news reports used other frame that did not fall the six categories of frames developed in this study."

==== Bangladesh ====
In Bangladeshi reports, the most cited sources were aid agencies for the Rohingya with 19.6% of the sample of news media. Second, were national officials with 17.8% of the media sample, and Myanmar was cited the least at 5.9%.¹ Also found in Islam's study were Bangladeshi news reports that found, Rohingya appeared 10.4%, foreign officials appeared 16.3%, local admin appeared 14.1%, national elite appeared 14.8%, and other appeared 8.3%.

==== India ====
From Md Khadimul Islam's study, Indian media cited national officials the most on the Rohingya issue at 34.7%. Next, aid agencies were cited at 20.8%, and Myanmar appeared 6.9%. Islam also notes that "Rohingya" appeared 8.3%, foreign officials appeared 8.3%, local admin appeared 1.4%, national elite appeared 11.1%, and other appeared 8.3%.

=== OHCHR Independent Fact-Finding Mission report ===
On 12 September 2018, the OHCHR Independent Fact-Finding Mission on Myanmar issued its report to the United Nations Human Rights Council. Following 875 interviews with victims and eyewitnesses since 2011, it concluded that "the [Burmese] military has consistently failed to respect international human rights law and the international humanitarian law principles of distinction, proportionality and precaution." Even before the most recent incident of mass Rohingya displacement began in 2011, the report found that the restrictions on travel, birth registration, and education resulting from Rohingya statelessness violated the Rohingya people's human rights. During the mass displacement of almost 725,000 Rohingya by August 2018 to neighbouring Bangladesh, as a result of persecution by the Tatmadaw, the report recorded "gross human rights violations and abuses" such as mass rape, murder, torture, and imprisonment. It also accused the Tatmadaw of crimes against humanity, genocide, and ethnic cleansing. The mission report recommended that six Burmese generals in the Tatmadaw stand trial in an international tribune for atrocities committed against the Rohingya.

=== Universal jurisdiction investigation ===
In 2019, the Burmese Rohingya Organisation UK (BROUK) filed a complaint alleging genocide and crimes against humanity committed by senior Myanmar officials against Rohingya Muslims with the Federal Criminal Correctional Court in Buenos Aires, Argentina, under the principle of universal jurisdiction defined in the constitution of Argentina. The Argentinian prosecutor gathered evidence in the case and held a hearing in 2023. On 14 February 2025, the court issued arrest warrants against junta leader Min Aung Hlaing, former president Htin Kyaw, and former state counsellor Aung San Suu Kyi on charges of "genocide and crimes against humanity" against the Rohingyas. In September 2025, BROUK filed a petition to extend the case to include Arakan Army leaders Twan Mrat Naing and Nyo Twan Awng; the alleged war crimes include the May 2024 events at Htan Shauk Khan.

=== ASEAN ===
A day before the 30th ASEAN Summit was held on 26 April 2017, Reuters reported on the Myanmar military operations on the Rohingya in November 2016. Nonetheless, the Rohingya crisis was not on the official agenda in the Summit.

However, leaders of ASEAN countries began to raise concerns on the issue. In a meeting with other ASEAN foreign ministers on 19 December 2016, Malaysian Foreign Minister Anifah Aman called for a collective effort to resolve the crisis. In addition, in the 30th ASEAN Summit, Indonesian President Joko Widodo discussed the issue of the Rohingya crisis with Suu Kyi. He stressed the importance of stability in Myanmar for the wider regional security.

The ASEAN states' hesitance to comment on the issue may be explained by a concern that the rise of China and its influence in Myanmar could risk ASEAN's interest in the country. Azeem Ibrahim, the author of The Rohingyas: Inside Myanmar's Hidden Genocide, noted "Myanmar's interactions with ASEAN are perhaps indicative of its wider approach to international relations."

As of 7 June 2019, ASEAN released a report stating optimism that half a million Rohingyas (referred to as "Muslim") will return to Myanmar in two years. The report allegedly glossed over the atrocities committed by Suu Kyi's regime. The UN has not yet commented.

=== NGOs ===
Matthew Smith of the NGO Fortify Rights said "[w]e can now say with a high level of confidence that state-led security forces and local armed residents have committed mass killings." Smith accused the Burmese military of trying to expel all Rohingyas from the country.

=== International courts ===
International Court of Justice

On 11 November 2019, The Gambia, with the support of the 57 nations of the Organization for Islamic Cooperation, filed a lawsuit against Myanmar in the UN International Court of Justice on behalf of the Rohingya. The lawsuit alleged that Myanmar committed genocide against the Muslim minority group and was filed in the World Court as a dispute between nations. More than 740,000 Rohingyas fled to Bangladesh, but the government insisted that the crackdown in Rakhine since 2017 was necessary to target terrorism. Aung San Suu Kyi personally led a legal team at the International Court of Justice to defend Myanmar in the first public hearings for this case on 10–12 December 2019. The court made no ruling as to whether Myanmar was responsible for genocide. However, it stated that Myanmar must take measures on an emergency basis to protect Rohingya Muslims and to retain evidence of possible genocide. On 19 November 2026, the ICJ found that Myanmar had committed genocide against the Rohingya, marking the first time a state has ever been found guilty by an international court of committing genocide. In the ruling, ICJ President Yuji Iwasawa declared that Myanmar had failed to prevent and punish genocide, detailing how the military had perpetrated "extreme violence" against Rohingya communities in Rakhine State. UN Secretary-General António Guterres welcomed the judgment as a "powerful recognition of the Rohingya victims of genocide," stating that it reaffirmed that impunity for such acts must not stand.

International Criminal Court

In November 2024, the prosecutor of the ICC, Karim Ahmad Khan, requested an arrest warrant for Min Aung Hlaing, holding him responsible for crimes against humanity for his role in the genocide. Since the ICC does not have automatically have jurisdiction in Myanmar, which is not a signatory to the Rome Statute, jurisdiction applies because Bangladesh, where many Rohingya have fled to, is a signatory to the treaty.

=== Protests ===
Muslim protests were held in various capital cities in Asian countries in late November 2016. Protests were held on 8 September 2017 across Asia in Bangladesh, Indonesia, the Philippines, Malaysia, and Pakistan in solidarity of the Rohingya people. Protests were also held by Rohingya people in Melbourne, Australia in early September 2017. Additional protests were held in the same month in Washington, D.C. in the United States, Cape Town in South Africa, and Jammu and Kashmir in India. A protest was planned in Hong Kong. In August 2025, a demonstration in Dhaka was held to express solidarity with the Rohingya.

== Criticism and controversies ==
=== UN agencies ===
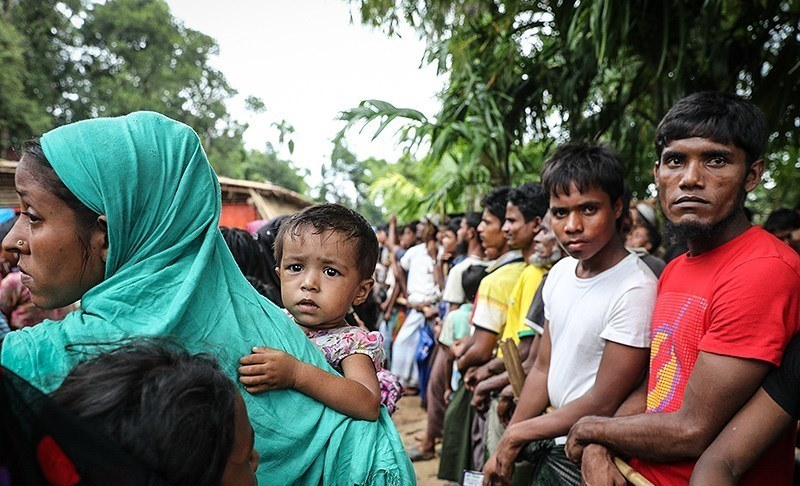
Rohingyas at the Kutupalong refugee camp in Bangladesh, October 2017

All NGOs and humanitarian agencies, including UN agencies, are bound by the humanitarian principles of humanity, impartiality, neutrality, and independence. As the 2018 Independent Fact-Finding Mission Report highlighted, UN agencies were aware of Rohingya persecution for almost three decades, with five consecutive Special Rapporteurs on the situation of human rights in Myanmar having been appointed since 1992. However, the Independent Fact-Finding Mission Report noted: "While Myanmar was repeatedly identified as a crisis situation requiring a human rights-driven response by the "whole of the United Nations", this approach was rarely, if ever, taken. Rather, many United Nations agencies have continued to prioritise development goals, humanitarian access, and quiet diplomacy. That approach has demonstrably failed, and the United Nations as a whole has failed adequately to address human rights concerns in Myanmar. Even now, the approach taken displays few signs of any lessons learned, with human rights missing from agreements recently signed with the Government."

The UN's continued attempts to cooperate with the Myanmar Government, despite the Government's unwillingness to acknowledge or address the Tatmadaw's persecution of the Rohingya, has allowed the humanitarian crisis to worsen. Although this approach complies with the common interpretation of other humanitarian principles, such as neutrality and impartiality, it neglects the core humanitarian principle of humanity. For example, a suppressed internal UN report heavily criticised the UN Country Team for ineffectively focusing on development and investment rather than on addressing the root causes of the persecution. Moreover, a September 2017 BBC investigation reported that, in an attempt to promote investment into Myanmar, UN officials prevented human rights activists travelling to Rohingya areas, tried to shut down public advocacy on the subject, and isolated staff that warned of ethnic cleansing. Despite these criticisms of the UN's approach, in June 2018 the UNDP and UNHCR entered an MoU with Myanmar Government providing for the reparation of Rohingya to Myanmar. On 13 November 2018, the plan to repatriate an initial 2,200 Rohingya was abandoned due to protests by Rohingya refugees.

=== International criticism of various sources ===
The ongoing genocide against the Rohingya people garnered strong criticism internationally and it also generated serious concerns about the human rights issues which were relevant to it. International communities and human rights organizations have all described the violence as an ethnic cleansing and a genocide. Soon after the security forces and Buddhist militia started "clearance operations", the world leaders warned the Myanmar authority to avoid civilian casualties. In late September, a seven-member panel of the Permanent Peoples' Tribunal accused Myanmar of conducting genocide against the Rohingya and the Kachin minority groups. The verdict came after a five-day trial, held at the law faculty of the University of Malaya, which examined various documentaries, expert views, and the testimony of victims. The tribunal made 17 recommendations including demilitarisation of Rakhine State and the end of discriminatory citizenship law. The United Nations' human rights chief Zeid bin Ra'ad described the persecution as "a textbook example of ethnic cleansing". On 5 December 2017, Ra'ad announced that the Rohingya persecution may constitute genocide under international human rights laws. In November, British prime minister Theresa May and U.S. Secretary of State Rex Tillerson described the situation as "ethnic cleansing" while the French President Emmanuel Macron called it genocide.

After a two-year investigation into the situation of the Rohingya ethnic minority, the human rights organization Amnesty International released a report which stated that the restricted area which the Rohingya people live in is "an open-air prison" where they are living under a "vicious system of institutionalized discrimination and segregation" which is limiting their human rights, their freedom of movement, and their access to food, healthcare, and education. Amnesty International mentions that the Rohingya minority are confined to their villages, townships, and poorly maintained camps which are cut off from the rest of Myanmar, and travel between their own villages is severely restricted. Travel between townships is subject to a complicated process of obtaining permission, and even then, those permitted to travel are routinely harassed, physically tortured or arrested. All these "systematic" acts of discrimination and persecution amount to apartheid, the rights group said.

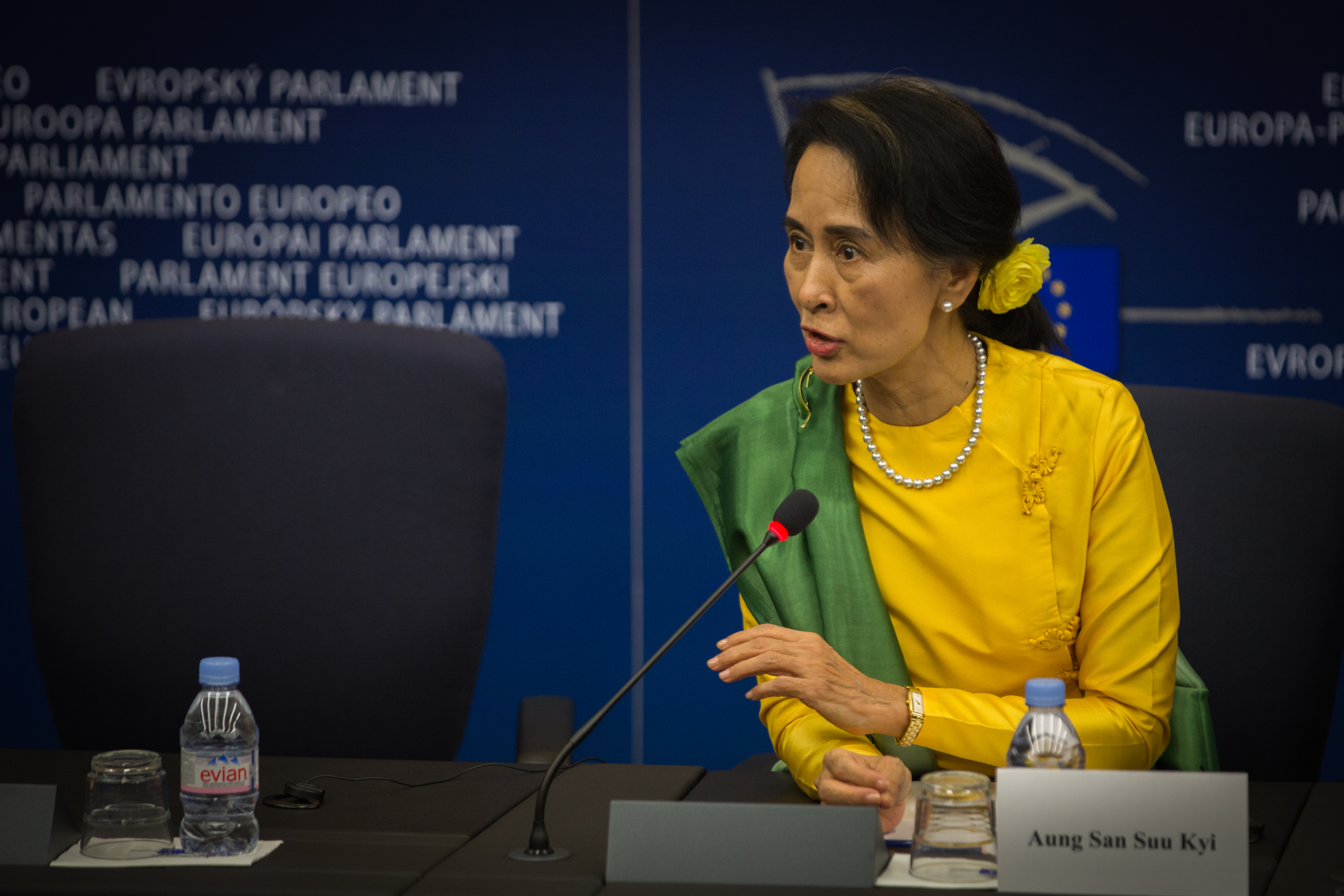
Myanmar leader and State Counsellor Aung San Suu Kyi

In 2016, Aung San Suu Kyi was criticised for her silence over the issue and supporting the military actions. She was relieved of her 1997 Freedom of Oxford award over "inaction" in handling the raging violence. Others argue that since the military retains significant autonomy and power in the government, she may be powerless to control them. Her inaction, on behalf of the Rohingya, brought a plea for action from fellow Nobel Peace Prize laureate Malala Yousafzai. Numerous people have called for Suu Kyi's Nobel Prize to be revoked. Nobel Peace Prize laureate Desmond Tutu also criticised Suu Kyi's stand to defend the military actions. The Economist criticised Suu Kyi's stance, arguing: "the violence in Rakhine has reached such an unconscionable level that there can be no justifying continued passivity."

Direct sanctions against the Burmese military and the imposition of penalties on firms which do business with companies which are linked to it, like the penalties which were imposed by the United States and other countries in the past, have been suggested as the best response to the violence. According to The Economist, "The Burmese army is not easy to influence, but economic and diplomatic isolation seems to have played a part in persuading it to surrender its power in the first place."

=== Facebook content management controversy ===
The chairman of the U.N. Independent International Fact-Finding Mission on Myanmar stated that Facebook played a "determining role" in the Rohingya genocide. Facebook has been accused of enabling the spread of Islamophobic content which targets the Rohingya people. The United Nations Human Rights Council has called the platform "a useful instrument for those seeking to spread hate".

The internet.org initiative was brought to Myanmar in 2015. Myanmar's relatively recent democratic transition did not provide the country with substantial time to form professional and reliable media outlets free from government intervention. Furthermore, approximately 1% of Myanmar's residents had internet access before internet.org. As a result, Facebook was the primary source of information and without verifiable professional media options, Facebook became a breeding ground for hate speech and disinformation. "Rumors circulating among family or friends' networks on Facebook were perceived as indistinguishable from verified news by its users." Frequent anti-Rohingya sentiments included high Muslim birthrates, increasing economic influence, and plans to take over the country. Myanmar's Facebook community was also nearly completely unmonitored by Facebook, who at the time only had two Burmese-speaking employees.

In response, Facebook removed accounts which were owned by the Myanmar Armed Forces because they had previously used Facebook to incite hatred against the Rohingya people, and they were currently "engaging in coordinated inauthentic behavior." In February 2021, Facebook banned the Myanmar military from its platform and set up rules to ban Tatmadaw-linked businesses.

The Myanmar military was not the only account found to have incited violence. In a review undertaken by Facebook in 2018, Facebook "banned accounts and pages associated with Myanmar military personnel that were indicated by the UN as being directly responsible for the ethnic cleansing in Rakhine. The banned accounts had a widespread reach in the country, as they were followed by nearly 12 million accounts, which is about half of all Myanmar's Facebook users."

On 6 December 2021, approximately a hundred Rohingya refugees launched a $150 billion lawsuit against Facebook, alleging that it did not do enough to prevent the proliferation of anti-Rohingya hate speech because it was interested in prioritizing engagement. On 10 December 2021, sixteen Rohingya youth living in Cox's Bazar refugee camp made a complaint against Facebook to the Irish National Contact Point for the OECD Guidelines for Multinational Enterprises, alleging that Facebook had violated the guidelines, and owed them a remedy. The lead complainants in the case included members of Rohingya civil society group Arakan Rohingya Society for Peace and Human Rights (ARSPH). Mohibullah, who founded ARSPH, and had spearheaded efforts amongst camp-based Rohingya refugees to hold Facebook accountable, had been murdered just over two months before.

On 27 December 2023, hundreds of students from various universities in Aceh, Indonesia, such as: Abulyatama University, Bina Bangsa Getsempena University, and University of Muhammadiyah Aceh, stormed a shelter for Rohingya refugees and forced them out of a convention centre in the city of Banda Aceh, demanding they be deported. The students were seen kicking the belongings of the Rohingya men, women, and children who were seated on the floor and crying in fear. They were also seen burning tyres and chanting various anti-Rohingya slogans. The protest was believed to be caused by Facebook due to anti-Rohingya sentiments that spread through the app.

On 23 January 2025, Rohingya human rights activist and genocide survivor Maung Sawyeddollah filed a whistleblower lawsuit against Meta before the U.S. Securities and Exchange Commission (SEC). The lawsuit accused Meta of having misled shareholders regarding its role in the Rohingya genocide in violation of U.S. securities law. The lawsuit was filed with the support of Amnesty International and the Open Society Foundations.

== Environmental impact ==
Many of the Rohingyas who were displaced by the violence fled to Cox's Bazar in Bangladesh. This area is considered climate vulnerable and at risk to weather events such as extreme rainfall, landslides, flash floods and tropical cyclones. Armed conflicts within Myanmar are a significant threat to the environment and contribute to the declining forest cover which is estimated at 0.87% per year. The majority of forest loss within Myanmar is on the periphery of armed conflicts or can be directly attributed to conflict.

The military operations in Rakhine State resulted in significant environmental and ecosystem damage within the state, leading to more than 90% of villages being partially or entirely destroyed by fire. This was due to the prevalence of arson and burning employed by the Burmese military. Rakhine State experienced significant loss in forest cover and loss of cultivated wetlands. The extent of the damage was extreme as, before the conflict, forest cover was prevalent within the state of Rakhine. After the military operation, all forms of environmental land cover types such as cultivated wetlands were decimated.

The migration of Rohingya Muslims into Bangladesh has resulted in widespread environmental degradation. To facilitate the need for living spaces for refugees, stairs and terraces were cut into the existing landscapes. To supply the demand for settlements for the Rohingya refugees, 3,713 acres of forest were cut from the Ukhia, Whykong, and Teknaf forest ranges along the Myanmar–Bangladesh border to build temporary housing. The need for fuel for cooking has been a significant driver of forest cover loss within the region. These forest use issues result in the degradation of critical habitats threatening the regions wildlife. One such example of this is the Kutupalong camp's expansion. This expansion encroached onto the endangered Asian elephant's migration route.

The Kutupalong Rohingya refugee camp in Bangladesh was found to be the largest refugee camp in 2018, utilizing 1,328 acres of forest land. These makeshift camps are subject to environmental risks such as landslides and flash floods. These conditions, paired with unpaved and slippery roads, pose risks for elderly, young and Rohingya women. Waste within these refugee camps is also an issue with over 100 tons of disposable waste collected each month.

== See also ==
- 21st-century genocides

=== Similar topics within Myanmar ===
- Operation Dragon King
- Operation Clean and Beautiful Nation
- 2013 Myanmar anti-Muslim riots
- Persecution of Muslims in Myanmar

=== Similar topics within Mainland Southeast Asia ===
- Cambodian genocide
- Hmong genocide
- Ketuanan Melayu
- Persecution of Hindus in Malaysia
- Persecution of the Montagnard in Vietnam
- Sook Ching
