= Arakan Rohingya Islamic Front =

Former Rohingya insurgent group

- Leader: Nurul Islam
- Dates active: 1986–1998
- Active regions: Rakhine State, Myanmar
- Ideology: Rohingya nationalism
- Wars: the Rohingya conflict

The Arakan Rohingya Islamic Front (ARIF) was a Rohingya insurgent group active in Rakhine State, Myanmar (Burma). The group was made up of Rohingya fighters led by Nurul Islam. The group was created after uniting the remnants of the Rohingya Patriotic Front (RPF) and a defecting faction of the Rohingya Solidarity Organisation (RSO) that was under the command of Nurul Islam.

On 28 October 1998, the ARIF merged with RSO and formed the Arakan Rohingya National Organisation (ARNO), operating in-exile in Cox's Bazar. The Rohingya National Army (RNA) was established as its armed wing.

It was responsible for a bomb attack on a military target in Maungdaw, Rakhine State, on 10 November 1991. It killed eight people.
