= Rohingya Patriotic Front =

- Abbreviation: RPF
- President: Muhammad Jafar Habib
- Secretary-General: Muhammad Yunus
- Vice President: Nurul Islam
- Founded: 12 September 1973
- Dissolved: 1986
- Succeeded by: Rohingya Solidarity Organisation, Arakan Rohingya Islamic Front
- Headquarters: Cox's Bazar, Bangladesh
- Ideology: Rohingya nationalism
- Religion: Islam

The Rohingya Patriotic Front (RPF) was a political organisation headquartered in Cox's Bazar, Bangladesh. The RPF had a small and poorly armed insurgent army of 70 fighters, who were active along the Bangladesh–Burma border and in northern Arakan, Burma (present-day Rakhine State, Myanmar). The goal of the RPF was to create an autonomous Muslim zone for the Rohingya people.

Muhammad Jafar Habib, a graduate of Rangoon University and a native of the town of Buthidaung, was the leader of the RPF. He was formerly the secretary of the Rohingya Liberation Party (RLP).

== History ==
On 26 April 1964, the Rohingya Independence Front (RIF) was established with the goal of creating an autonomous Muslim zone for the Rohingya people. The name of the group was changed to the Rohingya Independence Army (RIA) in 1969 and then to the Rohingya Patriotic Front (RPF) on 12 September 1973. In June 1974, the RPF was reorganised with Muhammad Jafar Habib as self-appointed president, Nurul Islam, a Rangoon-educated lawyer, as vice president, and Muhammad Yunus, a medical doctor, as secretary general.

On 6 February 1978, the socialist military junta of General Ne Win began Operation Nagamin (Operation Dragon King) in northern Arakan (Rakhine State), one of the objectives of which was to arrest members of the RPF. The operation created disagreements between the RPF, causing the organisation to split into several factions, many of which later merged to become the Rohingya Solidarity Organisation (RSO) in 1982. In 1986, the RPF merged with a faction of the RSO led by the former vice president of the RPF, Nurul Islam, and became the Arakan Rohingya Islamic Front (ARIF).
