= Aung Kyaw Moe =

Aung Kyaw Moe may refer to:

- Aung Kyaw Moe (footballer)
- Aung Kyaw Moe (politician)
