= Faith movement =

Faith movement may refer to:

- Word of Faith, a worldwide Christian movement
- Faith Movement Arakan, an insurgent group active in Rakhine State, Myanmar (Burma)
