= Ataullah abu Ammar Jununi =

Leader of the Arakan Rohingya Salvation Army

Ameer Ataullah abu Ammar Jununi
- عطالله أبو عمار جنوني
- Born: Karachi, Pakistan
- Other name: Ata Ullah
- Military career
- Allegiance: Arakan Rohingya Salvation Army
- Active: 9 October 2016 – 18 March 2025
- Rank: Imam Commander
- Conflicts: Internal conflict in Myanmar: Northern Rakhine State clashes

Signature
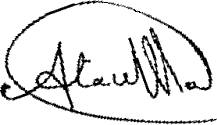

Ataullah abu Ammar Jununi (Arabic: عطالله أبو عمار جنوني) is a Rohingya militant who serves as leader of the Arakan Rohingya Salvation Army (ARSA), a Rohingya insurgent group active in northern Rakhine State, Myanmar. Ataullah has appeared in several videos released online by ARSA, where he gives press statements and speeches. In 2016 and 2017, Jununi led the ARSA in major attacks on Myanmar police posts on the border with Bangladesh. Following this the Tatmadaw launched operations against the Rohingya, also known as the Rohingya genocide. In March 2025, Jununi was arrested by the border security Rapid Action Battalion.

== Early life ==
Ataullah was born in Karachi, Pakistan into a Rohingya family from Myanmar who had fled religious persecution during the 1960s. At an early age, Ataullah's family moved to Mecca, Saudi Arabia, where he studied in an Islamic school. Ataullah later served as an imam for the Rohingya diaspora community in Mecca which numbered around 150,000, before migrating to Mutiara Damansara, Malaysia under the new title of Mevlana Hezri.

== Insurgency ==
The International Crisis Group (ICG) released a report in December 2016 stating that Jununi had close links with Saudi Arabia. The ICG report states that Jununi left Saudi Arabia in 2012, shortly after religiously motivated violence erupted in Rakhine State. A Myanmar government press release claimed that Jununi spent six months training in modern guerrilla warfare under the Taliban in Pakistan. The report stated that there are indications he went to Pakistan, and possibly elsewhere, to receive training in guerrilla warfare. Several members of the group also stated to the ICG that he may have received additional training in Libya before his return to Rakhine State.

On 9 October 2016, Jununi led hundreds of ARSA insurgents to the Bangladesh–Myanmar border, where they attacked Burmese border police posts. A week later, Jununi appeared in a video online, claiming responsibility for the attacks. Jununi led a second large-scale attack on 25 August 2017, which resulted in the deaths of 71 people. ARSA was blamed for the Kha Maung Seik massacre of 99 Bengali Hindus that occurred on the same day, a charge Jununi denied.

Jununi's half-brother, Muhammad Shah Ali, a member of ARSA, was arrested by the Armed Police Battalion on 16 January 2022 in a camp near Cox's Bazar while carrying arms and drugs. After his half-brother was arrested, Jununi was interviewed by Bangladeshi news channel, Jamuna TV in February 2022.

In June 2022, Bangladesh Police accused Jununi of ordering the murder of Mohib Ullah because Jununi feared that Mohibullah and his organization, the Arakan Rohingya Society for Peace and Human Rights, would impede ARSA's operations. The police also accused Jununi of demanding Mohib shutdown his organization and join ARSA, which Mohib refused.

== Arrest ==
On 18 March 2025, Jununi was arrested by Bangladesh's Rapid Action Battalion in Narayanganj.
