= Mayu River =

Location
- Country: Myanmar (Rakhine State)

Physical characteristics
- Source
  - coordinates: 20°50′56″N 92°32′58″E
- Mouth
  - location: Bay of Bengal
  - coordinates: 20°12′35″N 92°44′9″E

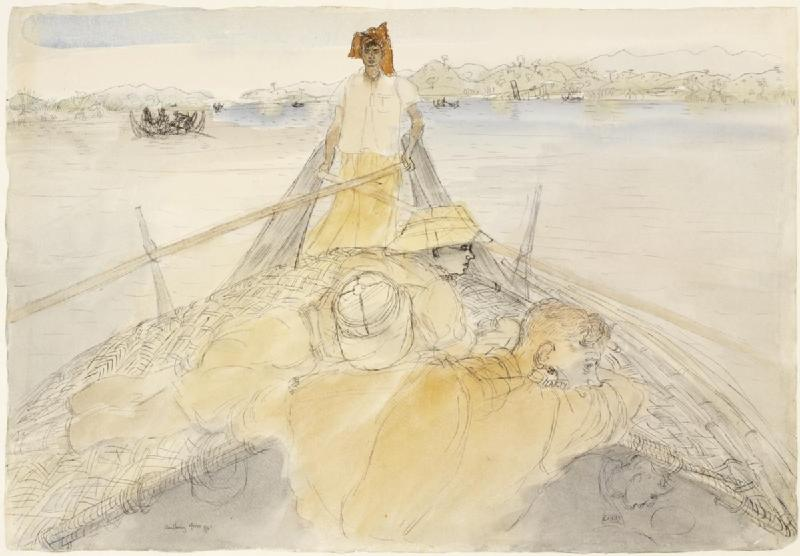
Battle of Arakan, 1943; a sampan convoy on the Mayu River

The Mayu (Burmese: မယူမြစ်) is a river in Rakhine State, Myanmar (Burma). The river and its surrounding region, known as the Mayu region or Mayu peninsula, is named after the nearby Mayu Mountain. It was formerly known as the Manlayuwaddy River. It is the third most used river in Rakhine State, and is 96 miles (154 kilometers) long and drains into the Bay of Bengal, near Sittwe. It passes through Buthidaung, Rathedaung and Sittwe. Small boats can travel along the river from Sittwe to Buthidaung, about 75 miles upstream.
