= Mohib Ullah =

Rohingya activist (1971–2021)

- Born: 1971; Garatbill, Myanmar
- Died: 29 September 2021 (aged 49–50); Kutupalong Refugee Camp, Bangladesh
- Cause of death: Assassination
- Education: B.Sc, Sittway University
- Organization(s): Arakan Rohingya Society for Peace and Human Rights
- Title: Peace Father
- Movement: Justice, Peace, Unity and Returning home
- Spouse: Naseemah Begum
- Parents: Fatal Ahmad (father); Umme Fazli (mother)

Mohib Ullah (1971 – 29 September 2021; often written as Mohibullah) was a Rohingya peace activist, community leader and co-founder of the Arakan Rohingya Society for Peace and Human Rights (ARSPH), a refugee-led organization in Kutupalong refugee camp in Cox's Bazar, Bangladesh. Mohib, Saya Salauddin along with some other Rohingya intellectuals founded ARSPH shortly after fleeing Myanmar to Bangladesh following the 2017 Tatmadaw operations against the Rohingya, also known as the Rohingya genocide.

Mohib was a very visible leader in the refugee camp and a spokesperson for Rohingya worldwide. The Rohingya in the camp nicknamed him 'Peace Father'. In March 2019, Mohib travelled to Geneva to address the United Nations Human Rights Council on behalf of the Rohingya in Bangladesh. In July 2019, he was among a group of victims of religious persecution who met with U.S. President Donald Trump at the White House. He asked the president about his administration's plans to help the Rohingya return home. In August 2019, Mohib organized a ceremony in Kutapalong refugee camp to commemorate the Rohingya genocide two years ago, attended by some 200,000 refugees.

== Early life ==
Mohib Ullah grew up in Sikder Para village in Maungdaw, Rakhine State. There, he worked as a teacher and humanitarian worker. He married and had nine children.

== Activism ==
In 2010, Mohib became the chairman of the Buthidaung Maungdaw Regional Development Association (BMRDA). In 2012, he began to write posts for RohingyaBlogger.com about the atrocities committed against the Rohingya, and the need for justice. In November 2014, he met with US President Barack Obama when he visited Myanmar, and expressed concern about the country's treatment of ethnic minorities.

=== Exile in Bangladesh ===
Mohibullah and his family were forced to flee their home in August 2017. This was during clearance operations carried out against the Rohingya population by the Myanmar military in Rakhine State.

=== Arakan Rohingya Society for Peace and Human Rights ===
Mohib met with a group of community leaders and established ARSPH shortly after arriving at Cox's Bazar. ARSPH was formed for three reasons. First, to document, and seek justice for, the atrocities committed against the Rohingya. Second, to build a community of leaders within the camp to advocate for Rohingya human rights and genuine democracy in Myanmar. Finally, to prepare the Rohingya to return to their homes in Rakhine State. Mohib described working toward three objectives: "justice; peace and unity; and returning home".

ARSPH's justice work consisted of documenting the atrocities committed during the violence against the Rohingya in 2016–2017, and before. To document these crimes, ARSPH volunteers walked door-to-door in the camp to find out who had family members who had been killed and who had suffered or witnessed other outcries such as torture, rape, and the burning of homes and villages.

ARSPH advocated for the safe and voluntary repatriation of the Rohingya to their homeland in Rakhine State. It was organizing discussions on the issue of repatriation within the camp at the time of Mohib's death. Mohib had also reached out to the National Unity Government (Myanmar's government in opposition) and groups opposed to the junta in Myanmar to discuss the repatriation of the Rohingya.

=== International forums ===
In March 2019, Mohib travelled to Geneva with another Rohingya leader, Hamida Khatun of the women's organization Shanti Mohila, to address the UN Human Rights Council. There, he addressed the diplomatic missions of states from around the world, saying, "Imagine you have no identity, no ethnicity, no country." Nobody wants you. How would you feel? This is how we feel today as Rohingyas." After his death, the High Commissioner for Human Rights reflected on his 2019 speech, saying, "His words were very powerful and highlighted the terrible situation of the Rohingya, and today, four years later, they reverberate as a reminder that the Rohingya are still waiting for justice and still waiting to return home."

In July 2019, Mohib travelled to Washington DC, where he was one of a group of refugee victims of religious persecution to meet with US President Donald Trump. At the meeting, he asked President Trump "what the plan is" to help the Rohingya return to Myanmar. President Trump did not answer the question and did not seem to know where Bangladesh is. The meeting received wide coverage in the international media.

On 25 August 2019, Mohib organized a ceremony at the refugee camp to commemorate two years since the start of the 2017 eviction operations at the camp – a day that many refugees refer to as "Genocide Day". The ceremony was attended by some 200,000 refugees. Mohib addressed the crowd and said the Rohingya would return to Myanmar. However, they would do so only after they are granted citizenship, their safety is guaranteed and they are allowed to settle back in their villages. He told the rally participants that ARSPH had tried to contact the Myanmar government. He said, "We were beaten, killed and raped in Rakhine." But this is still our home. And we want to return."

== Death and legacy ==
Mohib was shot and killed by ARSA group of armed men on 29 September 2021. He was speaking to a group of people in his office at Cox's Bazar refugee camp. Bangladeshi police have charged 29 people over the murder, some of whom are members of the militant group the Arakan Rohingya Salvation Army (ARSA).

The day after Mohib's assassination, a funeral prayer was held for him in the camp, attended by thousands of people. Mohib was buried in a cemetery in the camp.

Numerous international organizations and states, including the U.N. and United States condemned the killing of Mohibullah, and demanded a transparent and thorough investigation of his murder. According to his lawyer, Eva Buzo, Mohib had been receiving death threats, particularly in the 12 months prior to his murder.

The Bangladesh Police stated in March 2022 that he had been murdered by the Arakan Rohingya Salvation Army who saw his increasing popularity as a threat.

An investigative report submitted to a court in Cox's Bazar in June 2022 accused ARSA's leader Ataullah abu Ammar Jununi of ordering the murder because he feared Mohib Ullah and his organization Arakan Rohingya Society for Peace and Human Rights's popularity, which he believed could be an impediment in ARSA's operations. The police also stated that he had told Mohib Ullah to shut down the operations of his organization and join ARSA, but he refused. Meanwhile, the Bangladesh Police had arrested fifteen out of 29 suspects it had accused of being involved in the murder.
