= Rathedaung =

Rathedaung ရသေ့တောင်မြို့
- Location in Myanmar (Burma)
- Coordinates: 20°29′00″N 92°45′00″E
- Country: Myanmar
- Division: Rakhine State
- District: Sittwe District
- Township: Rathedaung Township

Population (2014)
  - Total: 7,511
- Time zone: UTC+6.30 (MMT)
- Area codes: 42, 43

Rathedaung (Burmese: ရသေ့တောင်မြို့) is the administrative town of Rathedaung Township in Rakhine State, Myanmar (Burma). It is situated beside the Mayu River and is located 65 kilometres (40 mi) north of Sittwe. The town is split into four quarters; Taung Ran Tan and Chaung Wa are the northeast and southeast quarters respectively. There is one high school in Rathedaung, located in the Taun Ran Tan quarter. Most people in Ratheduang are farmers or fishermen by profession.

The town was captured by the Arakan Army from the Tatmadaw on 17 March 2024 following two weeks of fighting. The last 200 junta soldiers reportedly left the riverside town by boat.
