= Nurul Islam (lawyer) =

Rohingya political activist (born 1948)

- Born: 1948 (age 77–78); Chilkhali, Maungdaw, Arakan, Myanmar
- Education: University of Yangon (B.A., LL.B.); University of East London (LL.M.)
- Occupations: Lawyer, political activist
- Years active: 1974 – present
- Organization: Arakan Rohingya National Organisation

Nurul Islam is a Rohingya political activist and Yangon-educated lawyer from Myanmar (Burma). He is the president of the Arakan Rohingya National Organisation (ARNO) and lives with his family in London, the United Kingdom.

== Early life ==
Nurul Islam was born in Chilkhali, Maungdaw Township, North Arakan, Myanmar.

== Political activism ==
Islam is the president of the Arakan Rohingya National Organisation (ARNO), a political organisation that campaigns for the rights of the Rohingya people, an ethnic minority in northern Rakhine State, Myanmar. He has worked closely with other organisations, such as the National United Party of Arakan, a Rakhine nationalist political party.

Islam is a vocal political activist, having held multiple peaceful rallies outside the Burmese embassy in London, where he resides. He, along with his associates, has called on the international community to "protect the defenseless Rohingyas". He worked as a Consultant on Arakan Affairs of the Euro-Burma office (EBO) in Brussels until 2010. He is currently a Supreme Council member of Arakan Rohingya Union. He is also a Coordinator on Policy Affairs of Free Rohingya Coalition.

== Revolution ==
On April 26, 1964, Nurul Islam joined the Rohingya Independence Front with Jafar Habib as founding members. Their goal was to transform north Arakan into a Rohingya autonomous state. After graduating from the University of Yangon, Islam became the vice-president of the Rohingya Patriotic Front in 1974. In August 1975, the RPF headed to the Bangladeshi border to acquire weapons and conduct paramilitary training. During this time, Islam was the foreign secretary of the group. A year later, he contributed his writing to the RPF constitution, Rohingyas' Outcry and Demands. However, he left the RPF in August 1978 due to the alleged incompetence of RPF leader, Jafar Habib. He eventually joined the Rohingya Solidarity Organization in 1982. Because of splits between Islam and Mohammed Yunus within the RSO, his faction united with the RPF to form the Arakan Rohingya Islamic Front on June 30, 1986. This merger officially finalized on August 22, 1987.

His brother, Mohammad Anwar was arrested by the SLORC while assisting the Student Youth Party for the Development of Mayu (Arakan) during the 1990 election. Junta authorities claimed he was assisting the RSO. On December 11, 1998, Islam merged ARIF and RSO to form the Arakan Rohingya National Organization.

== Education ==
Islam studied basic education at Maungdaw. He achieved a Bachelor of Arts (B.A.) and a Bachelors of Law (LL.B.) from Rangoon University (now the University of Yangon) in 1972 and 1973 respectively. He completed a Diplomacy Training Program course at the University of New South Wales in Australia, and achieved a masters (LL.M.) in Human Rights from the University of East London in 2007.
