= Arakan Rohingya Salvation Army =

Insurgent group in Rakhine State, Myanmar

- 𐴀𐴝𐴌𐴝𐴑𐴝𐴕 𐴌𐴟𐴇𐴝𐴥𐴙𐴚𐴒𐴙𐴝 𐴏𐴠𐴓𐴜𐴞𐴤𐴐𐴠𐴕 𐴀𐴝𐴌𐴔𐴞
- Logo of ARSA (𐴌𐴟𐴇𐴝𐴥𐴙𐴚𐴒𐴙𐴝)
- Leaders: Ustad Khalid; Ataullah abu Ammar Jununi (POW)
- Dates active: 2013 – present
- Headquarters: Rohingya refugee camps, Cox's Bazar
- Active regions: Bangladesh–Myanmar border Northern Rakhine State; Chittagong Division
- Ideology: Nationalism Islamism; Separatism; Jihadism; Islamic Nationalism
- Status: Active
- Size: 5,000+

The Arakan Rohingya Salvation Army (ARSA; Rohingya: 𐴀𐴝𐴌𐴏𐴝), formerly known as Harakah al-Yaqin (Arabic: حركة اليقين, lit. 'faith movement'; Rohingya: 𐴀𐴝𐴥𐴓𐴘𐴝𐴑𐴞𐴕), is a Rohingya insurgent group originating from northern Rakhine State, Myanmar. According to a December 2016 report by the International Crisis Group, it is led by Ataullah abu Ammar Jununi, a Rohingya man who was born in Karachi, Pakistan, and grew up in Saudi Arabia. Other members of its leadership include a committee of Rohingya émigrés in Saudi Arabia. Ataullah and the group's leadership have allegedly received military training from the Pakistani Taliban.

Myanmar's Anti-Terrorism Central Committee declared ARSA a terrorist group on 25 August 2017 in accordance with the country's counter-terrorism law. ARSA is also considered a terrorist group by Malaysia.

ARSA has been accused by Myanmar's government of being involved with and subsidised by foreign Islamists, despite there being no firm evidence proving such allegations. ARSA subsequently released a statement on 28 August 2017, calling government allegations against it as "baseless" and claiming that its main purpose is to defend the rights of Rohingyas. Despite this claim, ARSA members have been arrested for murders and acts of arson against other Rohingyas, particularly community leaders, residing in Bangladesh.

== History ==
=== Prior to 2016 ===
According to an ARSA spokesperson, the group was founded as Harakah al-Yaqin (lit. 'Faith Movement') in 2013, following the 2012 Rakhine State riots. A former member of ARSA described how he was recruited by the group's leader, Ataullah abu Ammar Jununi, three years prior to the attacks in October 2016. Jununi had approached villagers, asking for five to ten recruits to join his group and telling them that the time had come to "stop the mistreatment of the Rohingya people". Prior to the October 2016 attacks, ARSA had merely patrolled villages armed with bamboo sticks, making sure that villagers prayed at mosques. According to Rohingya locals and Burmese security officials, the group had again began approaching Rohingya men from various villages for recruitment six months prior to its first attack in October 2016, this time with the intention of training them across the border in Bangladesh for a future attack in Myanmar.

=== 2016 ===
In October 2016, the group claimed responsibility for attacks on military posts along the Bangladesh-Myanmar border, which left nine border officers and four soldiers dead. The Tatmadaw (Myanmar Armed Forces) announced on 15 November 2016 that a total of 69 insurgents had been killed by security forces in the recent fighting. The ICG reported on 14 December 2016 that in interviews with ARSA, its leaders claimed to have links to private donors in Saudi Arabia and Pakistan. The ICG also released unconfirmed reports that Rohingya villagers had been "secretly trained" by Afghan and Pakistani fighters.

=== 2017 ===
Burmese state media reported on 22 June 2017 that three insurgents had been killed by security forces in a raid on an insurgent camp supposedly belonging to ARSA, as part of a two-day "area clearance operation" by the government. Authorities confiscated gunpowder, ski masks and wooden rifles used for training.

In July 2017, the Burmese government accused ARSA of murdering 34 to 44 civilians and kidnapping 22 others in reprisal attacks against those ARSA have perceived as government collaborators. ARSA denied the accusations.

On 25 August 2017, the group claimed responsibility for coordinated attacks on at least two dozen police posts and an attempted raid on an army base. The government gave an official death toll of 77 Rohingya insurgents and 12 security forces in northern Maungdaw following the attacks. The government stated that ARSA insurgents had attacked a police station in the Maungdaw District with a handmade bomb alongside the coordinated attacks on several police posts. ARSA claimed they were taking "defensive actions" in 25 different locations and accused government soldiers of raping and killing civilians. The group also claimed that Rathedaung had been under a blockade for more than two weeks, starving the Rohingya, and that government forces were preparing to do the same in Maungdaw. The Myanmar Army also blamed ARSA for the killings of 99 Bengali Hindus in the Kha Maung Seik massacre, which occurred on the same day as the attacks.

Over 4,000 ethnic Rakhines fled their villages on 26 August 2017, as fighting between ARSA and the Tatmadaw escalated.

In late August 2017, the Burmese government accused ARSA of killing 12 civilians, including Hindus and Muslims, some of whom were suspected by ARSA of being government informants. On 24 September 2017, Myanmar's military accused ARSA of killing 28 Hindus in Ye Baw Kya village in the previous month after they uncovered their bodies in a mass grave. ARSA released a statement on 28 August 2017, calling government allegations against it as "baseless" and stating that ARSA only seeks to defend Rohingyas and their rights. An ARSA spokesman also denied allegations that it was behind the killings and accused Buddhist nationalists of spreading lies to divide Hindus and Muslims. Bangladesh meanwhile has proposed joint military operations with Myanmar against ARSA.

A one-month unilateral ceasefire was declared by ARSA on 9 September 2017, in an attempt to allow aid groups and humanitarian workers safe access into northern Rakhine State. In a statement, the group urged the government to lay down their arms and agree to their ceasefire, which would have been in effect from 10 September until 9 October (the one-year anniversary of the first attacks on Burmese security forces by ARSA). The government rejected the ceasefire, with Zaw Htay, the spokesperson for the State Counsellor's office, stating, "We have no policy to negotiate with terrorists." ARSA responded on 7 October 2017 that they would respond to any peace initiatives proposed by Myanmar's government, but added that their one-month unilateral ceasefire was about to end. Despite the ceasefire ending on 9 October, the government stated that there were no signs of any new attacks.

On 9 November 2017, Myint Khyine, the Burmese secretary of the Immigration and Population Department, blamed the deaths of 18 village leaders in the last three months on ARSA in Muslim-majority Maungdaw and Buthidaung. The victims were village leaders who helped the Immigration and Population Department issue national verification cards to Rohingya residents.

In September 2017, Bangladeshi sources stated that the possibility of cooperation between Pakistan's Inter-Services Intelligence (ISI) and ARSA was "extremely high". Bangladesh's Minister of Road Transport and Bridges(Contemporary), Obaidul Quader, stated during a reception organised by the nation's deputy high commission in Kolkata, India that his country was investigating the allegations.

In November 2017, it was reported that members of the Rohingya diaspora in Malaysia were providing financial support to ARSA.

=== 2018 ===
ARSA claimed responsibility for an ambush carried out on 5 January 2018 in the village of Turaing, which reportedly injured six members of Myanmar's security forces and a civilian driver.

In late November 2018, Hindu community leaders in Myanmar claimed that ARSA had been warning Hindu refugees in Bangladesh not to return to Rakhine State after Burmese authorities called for their repatriation.

=== 2019 ===
On 16 January, Myanmar state media reported that six police officers had been injured in an ambush by ten ARSA insurgents in Watkyein village bridge in Maungdaw. In March, ARSA's leadership called for their followers to refrain from criminal activity in refugee camps in Bangladesh refugee camps. This was statement was made in response to reports of killings and abductions in the refugee camps. Bangladeshi media blamed ARSA for the crimes, while ARSA denies any responsibility.

=== 2020 ===
Reports circulated in May 2020 that ARSA had reformed in Maungdaw after several months of inactivity. On 2 May, the Myawady Daily reported that two Burmese police officers had been attacked by 41 ARSA insurgents near the Bangladesh–Myanmar border.

Two alleged ARSA insurgents died in a confrontation with Myanmar security forces at the Bangladeshi border on 4 June. According to military spokesman and Brigadier General Zaw Min Tun, the clash occurred during routine border security at Mee Dike village and began when around 30 ARSA insurgents opened fire.

Three civilians were killed and six others were wounded when their vehicle struck an alleged ARSA mine in Maungdaw Township on 17 November.

=== 2021 ===
Rohingya leader Mohammed Mohib Ullah, who had raised the issue of human rights violations of Rohingyas and was an opponent of ARSA, was killed on 29 September 2021. His brother accused the group of being behind the attack, but the group denied it. The Bangladesh Police said in March 2022 that the group was behind it and assassinated him due to his growing popularity.

Some Rohingyas told Reuters that ARSA and other armed gangs enforced their rules at night in refugee camps, abducting their critics and instructing women to abide by conservative Islamic norms. An attack on the Darul Ulum Nadwatul Ulama Al-Islamia Madrasa in the Moinarghona camp-18, located in Ukhiya, resulted in deaths of six refugees and injuries to eight others on 22 October. Some of the eyewitnesses blamed ARSA.

Tom Andrews, the UN Special Rapporteur on the Situation of Human Rights in Myanmar, stated on 19 December that he had received credible reports of ARSA killing, torturing, abducting and intimidating Rohingya refugees in camps. Bangladesh's Foreign Minister AK Abdul Momen however denied the group's presence in the camps.

The group started reemerging in the Maungdaw region around November 2021, after allying with the National Unity Government formed in opposition to the military junta that took power after the 2021 Myanmar coup d'état. Clashes broke out between ARSA and the Tatmadaw in November.

On 7 December, 23 residents of Khone Taing village were shot at by ARSA, injuring one.

=== 2022 ===
Several images and videos appeared on social media in early-January 2022, purportedly showing more than 50 members of the group along with its leaders taking part in a military drill in Maungdaw.

Bangladesh Police on 18 July 2022 announced arrests of Nur Mohammad, chairman of ARSA's fatwa committee, and Abu Bakkar, a commander of the group accused of the killings of Rohingyas in October 2021. The two were stated to have been arrested on 7 and 17 July respectively. Armed Police Battalion unit 14 commander Naimul Haque claimed that they had arrested 834 Rohingyas linked to ARSA in the last six months.

In October 2022, two Rohingya community leaders were killed by a dozen people in an attempt to assert control of drug trafficking activity and intimidate leadership in the camps. According to an anonymous senior police officer of an elite police unit that was tasked with security in the camps, ARSA was the organization to be blamed for the killings.

Bangladeshi officials accused ARSA of being responsible for the killing of an intelligence officer and a Rohingya woman on 14 November during a counter-narcotics operations near the border with Myanmar. The group denied any responsibility.

=== 2023 ===
ARSA and the Rohingya Solidarity Organization (RSO) on 18 January 2023 clashed in a refugee camp, located near the Naikhongchhari Upazila in the no man's land of the Bangladesh–Myanmar border. One RSO member was killed and hundreds of refugees fled due to the fighting.

The Armed Police Battalion arrested six ARSA members on 5 May, including ARSA commander Hafizur Rahman. ARSA commander Hafiz Jubayer was arrested by the police on 10 May. On 12 June, Sabbir Ahmed, an ARSA leader was accused of being involved in the killings of six Rohingyas in October 2021.

ARSA was accused of killing Kutupalong refugee camp deputy leader Mohammad Ebadullah on 6 July. Five ARSA members were killed in clashes with RSO in Cox's Bazar the following day, while the group was accused of murdering an RSO member. ARSA and the Arakan Army (AA) clashed on 19 July in the Mayu mountains near Sein Hnyin Pyar and Gu Dar Pyin villages. The AA claimed that five ARSA members and one AA member were killed, with the AA seizing an ARSA outpost. ARSA commander Hafez Nur Mohammad was captured by the Rapid Action Battalion on 21 July in Cox's Bazar. ARSA commander Rahimullah Prakash Musa was arrested on 26 September, while Ataullah's personal secretary Mohammad Ershad Noman Chowdhury was arrested from the Kutupalong refugee camp on 2 October.

=== 2024 ===
ARSA began cooperating with the Tatmadaw in 2024. It was also accused of killing two civilians in Taung Pyo Let Wae town of Maungdaw Township on 7 March. Local residents then urged the Arakan Army to start "clearance operations" against ARSA.

On 12 April, clashes broke out between the Arakan Army and the junta-supported fighters of ARSA in Buthidaung Township, resulting in deaths of at least 25 Rohingya civilians and 3,000 Rohingyas fleeing. ARSA was also accused of burning down homes and kidnapping civilians in Buthidaung Township.

Four ARSA members were arrested by the 8th Armed Police Battalion in Ukhia on 23 February. Two militants, including a top coordinator and commander of the group, were arrested by the Rapid Action Battalion on 15 May. Four members were arrested by the 14th Armed Police Battalion in a refugee camp in Ukhia on 19 May, and an ARSA commander was arrested by it in a refugee camp in Ukhia on 22 May.

According to the Arakan Army and Rohingya refugees, ARSA forcibly press gangs young men and boys to fight with the Myanmar military; most soldiers later flee.

On 10 June, five ARSA members including Moulovi Akij, a top ARSA commander wanted for the murder of Mohib Ullah, were arrested by the Rapid Action Battalion in Ukhiya. On 13 June, the Rapid Action Battalion arrested Zakaria, a gun group commander in ARSA, with arms in Ukhiya. An ARSA commander named Nurul Islam was arrested in Ukhiya with arms and ammunition by the Armed Police Battalion on 19 September.

=== 2025 ===
On 18 March 2025, the Rapid Action Battalion (RAB) of Bangladesh arrested six individuals linked to ARSA, including the group's leader Ataullah abu Ammar Jununi. They were apprehended in Narayanganj, where RAB seized around 21.39 lakh taka (USD $17,608) in cash. 51.39 lakh taka, Malaysian ringgit, and US dollars were also seized at other properties. From 10 to 11 August, ARSA attacked Arakan Army camps and outposts in Taungpyoletwea, Maungdaw Township. In September, six villagers from the villages of Tamanthar and Done Nyo in Maungdaw Township were kidnapped and killed by ARSA members before dumping the bodies in banana groves near the village of Upper Inncchaung.

The Development Media Group stated that 40 Rakhine civilians had been killed and 17 injured in ARSA attacks from May 2025 to 23 October 2025. By late-November 2025, fighting between the Arakan Army and the Rohingya militant groups ARSA and RSO was reported to have intensified.

=== 2026 ===
On 11 January, 53 ARSA members were detained by Border Guard Bangladesh for trespassing into Bangladeshi territory. Before that, two people were injured by gunfire. In response, the Bangladesh government summoned Myanmar's ambassador to the country, Kyaw Soe Moe, to the Ministry of Foreign Affairs on 13 January. ARSA commander Zahid Hossain Prakash Lalu was arrested in Ukhia by Bangladesh's security forces for carrying out militant activities on 4 February. On 30 April, the Detective Branch of police arrested four alleged ARSA members in Dhaka with explosives, firearms and few other equipments.

On 30 July, an ARSA commander named Md. Zubayer was killed by unknown assailants in the Ukhiya refugee camp in Cox's Bazar. The 14 Armed Police Battalion (APBn) later stated that the killing may connected to internal conflicts between the ARSA and RSO-affiliated groups in the camps, according to preliminary findings.

== Ideology and structure ==
ARSA leader Ataullah abu Ammar Jununi stated in a video posted online, "Our primary objective under ARSA is to liberate our people from dehumanising oppression perpetrated by all successive Burmese regimes". The group claims to be an ethno-nationalist insurgent group and has denied allegations that they are Islamist, claiming they are secular and "have no links to terrorist groups or foreign Islamists". However, ARSA follows many traditional Islamic practices such as asking for fatwas from foreign Muslim clerics. Further, in a 2024 propaganda video, Jununi declared Rohingya aligned with the Arakan Army as apostates, threatening them with "divine punishment" and "violent reprisals".

In contrast to other insurgent groups in Myanmar, ARSA is not organised like a paramilitary. While other groups have military ranks and uniforms, most members of ARSA have appeared in videos wearing civilian clothes. The group is also ill-equipped; it was reported that during their attacks in Maungdaw District on 25 August, most of ARSA's fighters were armed with machetes and bamboo sticks. The local authorities responded with automatic gunfire, heavily outmatching ARSA's weapons.

Analysts have compared the tactics used by ARSA to those used by insurgent groups fighting in southern Thailand, namely crossing the border from one country to another to launch small scale attacks, then retreating back across the border to a community that shares a similar ethnic and/or religious background.

== Atrocities and war crimes ==
The Myanmar government alleged in a statement that ARSA killed four Muslims, including a village head and a government informant, on 25 August 2017. The next day on 26 August, another Muslim village head and a Hindu child were allegedly killed when ARSA insurgents fired at a monastery. In addition, six Hindus were stated to have been killed when the insurgents attacked a Hindu family. The Office of Myanmar's State Counsellor also blamed ARSA for the killings of five Daingnets on 26 August and seven Mro people on 31 August.

The mass-graves of 28 Hindus were found by Myanmar's security forces on 24 September 2017 near the village of Kampung Rawa, with 17 more bodies found on the next day. Three relatives of the deceased said that masked men marched 100 Hindus, loyal to Sasikumar Ramakrishnan, away from the village before slitting their throats and pushing them into a hole. The relatives recognised some of the attackers as Rohingya Muslims loyal to Ayoh Mevlana Hezri, who told their victims they should not be in possession of official identity cards, which were issued by the government to Hindus but not to Muslims. After the discovery of the bodies, the Myanmar government claimed the victims were killed by ARSA insurgents. An ARSA spokesman denied the allegation that it was behind the killings and accused Buddhist nationalists of spreading lies to divide Hindus and Muslims.

On 9 November, Myint Khyine, the secretary of the Immigration and Population Department, blamed the deaths of 18 village leaders in the past three months in Maungdaw and Buthidaung, on ARSA. The village leaders helped the department to issue national verification cards to Rohingya villagers.

On 22 May 2018, Amnesty International released a report claiming it had evidence that ARSA rounded up and killed as many as 99 Hindu civilians on 25 August 2017, the same day that ARSA launched a massive attack against Myanmar's security forces. The report alleged that ARSA insurgents armed with guns and swords were responsible for at least one reported massacre of Hindus in northern Rakhine State. Survivors claimed that in the village of Kha Maung Seik, ARSA insurgents killed the men, whilst the women were kidnapped and forced to convert to Islam. It was also alleged in the report that statements given by Hindus immediately after the massacre were false, and that they were threatened by ARSA into blaming Rakhine Buddhists for the killings.

The Rohingya Solidarity Organisation (RSO), a rival Rohingya insurgent group, blamed ARSA for 2020–2021 attacks against Rohingya community leaders in Bangladeshi refugee camps.

Before the Arakan Army captured Maungdaw, ARSA fighters allegedly threatened Rohingya inhabitants who refused to join their ranks. They also allegedly targeted people under 30 for conscription, including minors.

ARSA allegedly targets multiple civilians in the refugee camps, including religious leaders. According to Fortify Rights, ARSA is suspected in the 27 July 2018 disappearance of Mufti Mohammed Abdullah Khalil, a Rohingya Islamic scholar who was the lead author of a 30 October 2017 fatwa forbidding the taking up of arms in Rakhine State.

According to a June 2025 United Nations report, ARSA recruited 150 children in collaboration with the Tatmadaw.

== Press statements ==
ARSA periodically releases press statements online, in documents and videos posted to its Twitter account. Unlike other insurgent groups in Myanmar, most of ARSA's written statements are exclusively in English, rather than in the group's native tongue (in this case, Rohingya).

On 17 October 2016, ARSA (then under the name Harakah al-Yaqin) released a press statement online. In a roughly five-minute video, the group's leader, Ataullah abu Ammar Jununi, flanked by armed fighters reads from a sheet of paper:

Citizens of Arakan, citizens of Myanmar, and citizens of the world.

It is no longer a secret that the Rohingyas are the most persecuted ethnic minority on earth. Throughout the last six decades, we have been subjected to genocidal mass-killings, and all kinds of atrocities at the hands of successive tyrannical Burmese regimes.

Yet the world has chosen to ignore us! Then again, the "resourceful" world has apparently failed to save us!

We, the sons of Arakan soil, who are compelled by our dire situation to follow our own destiny through uprising, self-determination and self-defence, stand as an independent body which is free from all elements of terror in any nature, seek fundamental but legitimate rights and other justice for all Arakanese, including our fellow innocent Rohingyas and other civilians dying from the continuous military assaults.

We categorically state that our people have chosen to free themselves from their oppressors, from the tragic deaths in the Bay of Bengal, in the Thai jungles and at the hands of human traffickers. We have also resolved to defend our mothers, sisters, elderly, children and ourselves.

We shall not rest until all our desired goals are achieved with the genuine help of the civilised world.

Six other videos were released online by the group between 10 and 27 October 2016.

The group released a press statement on 29 March 2017 under a new name, the Arakan Rohingya Salvation Army (ARSA). The document included demands made to the Burmese government and a warning that if they were not met, there would be further attacks.
