= Arakan Rohingya Union =

International Rohingya organization

The Arakan Rohingya Union
- Formation: 2011-May-31
- Founder: Organization of the Islamic Conference (OIC)
- Type: Political
- Headquarters: 120 Meadowview Drive, State College, PA 16801, USA
- Ex-Director General (DG),: Professor Dr. Wakar Uddin Current Director General= Reza Uddin
- Website: https://www.arakanrohingyaunion.org/

The Arakan Rohingya Union (ARU) is an umbrella group for 61 Rohingya Organizations around the world. The ARU works to protect the rights of Rohingya Muslims in Myanmar.

== History ==
A convention was held at the General Secretariat of the Organisation of the Islamic Conference (OIC) on 30 and 31 May 2011. It was attended by senior Rohingya leaders representing many Rohingya associations around the world and with the participation of Euro-Burma office in Brussels. It discussed the difficulties faced by the Rohingya people and sought ways and means to assist them.

The convention issued a joint statement that included the formation of the Arakan Rohingya Union (ARU) under the patronage of the OIC Secretary General (38th council of Foreign Ministers' Conference Resolution No. 4/37-MM), to seek a political solution to the problems faced by the Rohingya people.

The ARU became accepted by many Rohingyas both in Myanmar and abroad.
