= Rohingya Solidarity Organisation =

Insurgent group in Rakhine State, Myanmar

- Leader: Mohammed Ayyub Khan
- Spokesperson: Ko Ko Linn
- Founded: 1982
- Dates active: 1982–1998, 2021–present
- Headquarters: Rohingya refugee camps
- Active regions: Bangladesh–Myanmar border; Northern Rakhine State
- Ideology: Rohingya nationalism; Islamism
- Status: Active
- Size: 3000–5000 (2024 reports)

The Rohingya Solidarity Organisation (RSO / 𐴀𐴝𐴌 𐴀𐴠𐴥𐴏 𐴖𐴡) is a Rohingya insurgent group and political organisation. It was founded in 1982 following a large scale military operation by the Tatmadaw (Myanmar Armed Forces). The group discontinued its armed rebellion in 1998 but rearmed shortly after the 2021 coup d'etat and is active in the ongoing Myanmar civil war where it cooperates with the Tatmadaw.

== History ==
=== 1990s ===
In the early 1990s, the military camps of the Rohingya Solidarity Organisation (RSO) were located in the Cox's Bazar District in southern Bangladesh. RSO possessed a significant arsenal of light machine-guns, AK-47 assault rifles, RPG-2 rocket launchers, claymore mines and explosives, according to a field report conducted by correspondent Bertil Lintner in 1991.

The military expansion of the RSO resulted in the government of Myanmar launching a massive counter-offensive to expel RSO insurgents along the Bangladesh-Myanmar border. In December 1991, Tatmadaw soldiers crossed the border and accidentally attacked a Bangladeshi military outpost, causing a strain in Bangladeshi-Myanmar relations. By April 1992, more than 250,000 Rohingya civilians had been forced out of northern Rakhine State (Arakan) as a result of the increased military operations in the area.

In April 1994, around 120 RSO insurgents entered Maungdaw Township in Myanmar by crossing the Naf River which marks the border between Bangladesh and Myanmar. On 28 April 1994, nine out of twelve bombs planted in different areas in Maungdaw by RSO insurgents exploded, damaging a fire engine and a few buildings, and seriously wounding four civilians.

On 28 October 1998, the Rohingya Solidarity Organisation merged with the Arakan Rohingya Islamic Front and formed the Arakan Rohingya National Organisation (ARNO), operating in exile in Cox's Bazar. The Rohingya National Army (RNA) was established as its armed wing.

=== 2000s to 2010s ===
One of the several dozen videotapes obtained by CNN from Al-Qaeda's archives in Afghanistan in August 2002 allegedly showed fighters from Myanmar training in Afghanistan. Other videotapes were marked with "Myanmar" in Arabic, and it was assumed that the footage was shot in Myanmar, though this has never been validated. Nurul Islam, a former leader of the RSO and founder of the Arakan Rohingya National Organisation denied links between Rohingya groups and Al-Qaeda; he stated that the tapes were an attempt by the State Peace and Development Council junta to curry favour with the United States' war on terror. He further refuted allegations of Taliban links by pointing out the alliance between ARNO and the Rakhine Buddhist National United Party of Arakan. According to intelligence sources in Asia, Rohingya recruits in the RSO were paid a 30,000 Bangladeshi taka (US$525) enlistment reward, and a salary of 10,000 taka ($175) per month. Families of fighters who were killed in action were offered 100,000 taka ($1,750) in compensation, a promise which lured many young Rohingya men, who were mostly very poor, to travel to Pakistan, where they would train and then perform suicide attacks in Afghanistan.

Regional experts in Rakhine State previously disputed the existence of the RSO as an active militant force after the early 2000s. The government of Myanmar blamed the RSO for attacks on border posts in October 2016 until the Arakan Rohingya Salvation Army claimed responsibility.

=== 2021 ===
Following the 2021 Myanmar coup d'état by the Tatmadaw, the RSO announced its rearmament in March 2021.

The RSO opposes the Arakan Rohingya Salvation Army (ARSA), whom the RSO blames for attacks against Rohingya community leaders in Bangladeshi refugee camps.

=== 2023 ===
Ko Ko Linn, a spokesperson for RSO and ARNO, allegedly ordered his followers to murder ARSA members in the Ukhiya refugee camp. However, he denied this, claiming a man living in Saudi Arabia made the speech.

=== 2024 ===
The RSO is accused of forcibly recruiting young men with the false promises of money or revenge against the latter community. Many of them are then handed over to the Myanmar military. Children are among those compelled to fight.

RSO was blamed for killing two students and a teacher in a refugee camp near Cox’s Bazar for refusing to fight against the Arakha Army on 30 May.

In a September interview with Reuters, Ko Ko Linn confirmed that the RSO and the SAC junta have an informal agreement not to attack each other. However, he denied active collaboration with the Myanmar military and claimed that the Arakan Army repeatedly rebuffed prior attempts to form an alliance.

During the Arakan Army's early December attack on BGP Post 5 in Maungdaw, RSO fighters reportedly fought alongside junta forces. After BGP Post 5 was captured, the RSO allegedly robbed refugees fleeing on the Naf River.

=== 2025 ===
In an interview with BBC Burmese, RSO's spokesperson Ko Ko Linn admitted that they defended Maungdaw alongside Tatmadaw forces against the Arakan Army's offensive. He also confirmed that Rohingya militant groups recruited from refugee camps in Bangladesh to fight the Arakan Army alongside the Tatmadaw.

Representatives of the RSO were spotted in a meeting with the Organization of Islamic Cooperation in a Rohingya refugee camp.

Possibly due to the organization's reputation as alleged junta collaborators, some RSO members refer to their group as the "Maungdaw Militia." As of January, RSO joined the "Four Brothers Alliance", a coalition of Rohingya militias. Allying with ex-opponents like Arakan Rohingya Salvation Army.

== Accusations of atrocities ==
The RSO, along with ARSA, is alleged to have committed multiple human rights violations, including the targeting of civilians and the recruitment of child soldiers.
