= Arakan Rohingya National Organisation =

London-based organisation of Rohingyas

- Abbreviation: ARNO
- Formation: 28 November 1998
- Purpose: Advocate for the interests and rights of Rohingya people
- Headquarters: London, United Kingdom
- Official languages: English and Rohingya
- Chairman: Nurul Islam
- Website: www.rohingya.org

The Arakan Rohingya National Organisation (ARNO) is a London-based organisation seeking to represent the interests of Rohingya people in Myanmar and abroad. It was founded on 28 November 1998. The National United Party of Arakan, an ethnic Rakhine organisation, was an ally of ARNO.
