= Rathedaung Township =

Coordinates: 20.4833°N 92.7500°E

Rathedaung Township ရသေ့တောင်မြို့နယ်
- Township
- Location in Sittwe district
- Country: Myanmar
- Division: Rakhine State
- District: Sittwe District
- Time zone: UTC+6:30 (MMT)

Rathedaung Township (Burmese: ရသေ့တောင်မြို့နယ်) is a township of Sittwe District in the Rakhine State of Myanmar. The principal town is Rathedaung. Communal clashes of June 2012 also spread to that township and there were at least three Buddhist casualties.

== Villages within the township ==
- ZeeKaing Village (ဇီးကိုင်း ကျေးရွာ)
- PhyuChaung Village (ဖြူချောင်း ကျေးရွာ)
- PyarChaungGyi Village (ပြားချောင်းကြီး ကျေးရွာ)
- DaingKyat Village (ဒိုင်းကျပ်ကျေးရွာ)
- ChayDawRer (ခြေတော်ရာကျေးရွာ)
- ThaZayHtauk (သာစည်ထောင့်ကျေးရွာ)
- Hnan Khinn Village (နှမ်းခင်း ကျေးရွာ)
- Let Pan Bin Rinn Village (လက်ပံပင် ရင်းကျေးရွာ)
- Rai Bike Sone Village (ရေပိုက်ဆုံကျေးရွာ)
- UGa Village (ဦးဂါကျေးရွာ)
- KreinTha village (ကြိမ်သာ ကျေးရွာ)
- Ka Nyain Chaungg village (ကညင် ချောင်း)
- Konetann village (ကုန်တန်း ကျေးရွာ)
- Kap Chaung Village (ကပ်ချောင်းကျေးရွာ)
- Kuutaung Village (ကူတောင် ကျေးရွာ)
- KyaukChaung Village (ကျောက်ချောင်းကျေးရွာ)
- kha Naunggkyee Village (ခနောင်းကြီး ကျေးရွာ)
- Khwa sone Village (ခွဆုံ ကျေးရွာ)
- Hkway Touthkyaungg Village (ခွေးတောက်ချောင်း ကျေးရွာ)
- Nga Tout Tuukyee Village (ငတောက်တူကြီး ကျေးရွာ)
- Hcaparrhtarr Village (စပါးထား ကျေးရွာ)
- Donepyin Village (ဒုံးပြင် ကျေးရွာ)
- Paungg Jarr Village (ပေါင်းဇား ကျေးရွာ)
- Pyinhkaung Village (ပြင်ခေါင် ကျေးရွာ)
- Pouttawkyee Village (ပေါက်တောကြီး ကျေးရွာ)
- Bhar Htalay Village (ဘာထလေ ကျေးရွာ)
- Minyo Htaw Ng Village (မိညိုထောင့် ကျေးရွာ)
- Myinnhpuu Village (မြင်းဖူး ကျေးရွာ)
- Saungg Dararr Village (သောင်းဒရား ကျေးရွာ)
- Kan Pyin Village (ကန္ျပင္ ကျေးရွာ)
- Ror Thit Kay Village (ရြာသစ္ေက ကျေးရွာ)
- Thoungdara Village ( ေသာင္းဓရား ကျေးရွာ)
- Kyauk Tan Village (ေက်ာက္တန္း ကျေးရွာ)
- Shwe Loung Tin Village ( ေရႊေလာင္းတင္ ကျေးရွာ)
- Loung Chaung Village ( ေလာင္းေခ်ာင္း ကျေးရွာ)
- Tha Ret Pyin Village (သရက္ျပင္ ကျေးရွာ)
- Tha Ret Chaung Village (သရက္ေခ်ာင္း ကျေးရွာ)
- Than Chaung Village (သံေခ်ာင္း ကျေးရွာ)
- Bar Hta Lay Village (ဘာထေလ ကျေးရွာ)
- Aanout Naann Rarkone Village (အနောက်နန်းရာကုန်း ကျေးရွာ)
- Aaungsiut Village (အောင်ဆိပ် ကျေးရွာ)
