= Aung Kyaw Moe (politician) =

Rohingya politician and activist

- အောင်ကျော်မိုး

Chairperson of Rohingya Consultative Council
- In office 2026 – Present

Deputy Human Rights Minister of NUG
- In office 30 June 2023 – July 31, 2026

Personal details
- Born: 1983 (age 42–43) Maungdaw, Rakhine State, Myanmar
- Education: Deakin University (M.A.)
- Occupation: Politician
- Website: aungkyaw-moe.com

Aung Kyaw Moe (Burmese: အောင်ကျော်မိုး; born 1983) is a Rohingya politician and Chairperson of the Rohingya Consultative Council. From 2023 to 2026, he previously served as deputy minister for human rights in the Myanmar National Unity Government (NUG).

== Early life ==
Aung Kyaw Moe was born in 1983 in Maungdaw in Rakhine State, Myanmar. This town lies on the shore of the Naf River near to the entry of the river into the Bay of Bengal. The Naf River forms part of the border between Bangladesh and Myanmar.

In 2016 and 2017, the Burmese military committed genocide and crimes against humanity against the Rohingya people in Rakhine. On 7 June 2023, Aung Kyaw Moe's brother, Than Myint, died after being stabbed.

== Career ==
Aung Kyaw Moe has worked with non-governmental organisations (NGOs) in Myanmar, Thailand, Afghanistan, and Liberia for 15 years.

In 2021, Aung Kyaw Moe became an adviser on human rights to the NUG and then, on 30 June 2023, he became deputy minister in the NUG ministry for human rights.

Aung Kyaw Moe is the first Rohingya person to serve in a ministerial position within the NUG.

On 31 July 2026, he resigned from the NUG; he claimed resigning would allow him to focus on the interests of the Rohingya people.

== Rohingya Consultative Council ==
In 2026, Aung Kyaw Moe officially resigned from the NUG to focus on the Rohingya Consultative Council, with the aim of integrating Rohingya movements towards Myanmar's political architecture, building alliances, and pursuing political roadmaps for the voluntary return of the Rohingya from Bangladesh and Malaysia.

He is serving as the Chairperson of the Rohingya Consultative Council alongside Secretary General Jaivet Ealom.

== Awards ==
In 2017, the Diplomatic Service of the European Union awarded Aung Kyaw Moe one of three inaugural Schuman awards. This award recognises outstanding merit in the protection of human rights in the preceding year.

In 2019, he received from the French government a special mention in the second theme (duty of mutual support) of the award of the Commission nationale consultative des droits de l’homme (CNCDH).

On 20 November 2019, Aung Kyaw Moe accepted the award of the Global Centre for Pluralism founded by His Highness the Aga Khan and the Government of Canada, on behalf of the Center for Social Integrity in Myanmar.

He has received fellowships including the George W. Bush Presidential Center Freedom and Leadership fellowship, the President Obama’s Leaders - Asia-Pacific Leaders fellowship and the Dalai Lama Fellowship of the American Institute of Peace. Other awards include Tomorrow’s Peacebuilder Award from Peace Direct and an honorary citizenship of Dallas for promoting liberty and community services in Myanmar.
