= Hinduism in Myanmar =

Burmese Hindus ဗမာဟိန္ဒူ

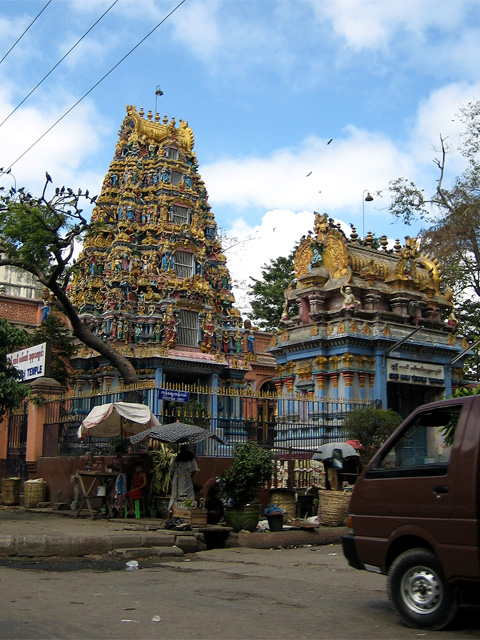
- Shri Kali Temple, a Hindu temple with Dravidian architecture in Yangon.

Total population
- c. 189,718 (0.6%) (2024) ▲

Religions
- Hinduism

Languages
- Liturgical; Sanskrit; Spoken; Burmese, Tamil, Telugu, Odia, Bengali, Rohingya, Chittagonian, Meitei, Nepali, English

Related ethnic groups
- Tamils, Odias, Meitei, Bengali Hindus in Myanmar, Burmese Gurkhas and Hindu Rohingyas

Hinduism is the fourth-largest religion in Myanmar, being practised by 0.6% of the population of Myanmar, or about 189,718 people, in 2024. Hinduism in Myanmar has been influenced by elements of Buddhism, with many Hindu temples in Myanmar housing statues of the Buddha. There is a sizable population of Hindus with the Myanmar Tamils and minority Bengali Hindus having the biggest population share.

== History ==
Hinduism was predominantly pervasive in Burma during ancient times, being introduced from the Indian subcontinent. The archaeological finds at the Pyu city-states indicate a widespread presence of Hinduism alongside Mahayana and Tantric Buddhist religions including iconography of Avalokiteśvara (called Lawkanat in Burmese; လောကနတ် [lɔ́ka̰ naʔ]). Various Hindu Brahman iconography ranging from the Trimurti Hindu trinity to Garuda and Lakshmi have been found, especially in Lower Burma. Hinduism declined after Theravada Buddhism was introduced by the Bagan Kingdom's 11th century conquests, although some practices and festivals remain part of Burmese culture. Both names of the country are rooted in Hinduism; Burma is the British colonial officials' phonetic equivalent for the first half of Brahma Desha, the ancient name of the region. Brahma is part of the Hindu trinity, a deity with four heads. The name Myanmar is the Mon and Burmese language transliteration of Brahma, where b and m are interchangeable.

The Arakan Yoma is a significant natural mountainous barrier between Burma and India, and the migration of Hinduism and Buddhism into Burma occurred slowly through Manipur and by South Asian seaborne traders. Hinduism greatly influenced the royal court of Burmese kings in pre-colonial times, as seen in the architecture of cities such as Bagan. Likewise, the Burmese language adopted many words from Sanskrit and Pali, many of which relate to religion.

While ancient and medieval arrival of ideas and culture fusion transformed Burma over time, it is in the 19th and 20th centuries that over a million Hindu workers were brought in by the British colonial government to serve in plantations and mines. The British also felt that surrounding the European residential centre with Indian immigrants provided a buffer and a degree of security from tribal theft and raids. According to 1931 census, 55% of Rangoon's (Yangon) population were Indian migrants, mostly Hindus.

After independence from Britain, the Burma Socialist Programme Party under Ne Win adopted policies expelling 300,000 Indian ethnic people (Hindus and Buddhists), along with 100,000 Chinese, from Burma between 1963 and 1967. The Indian policy of encouraging democratic protests in Burma increased persecution of Hindus, as well as led to Burmese retaliatory support of left-leaning rebel groups in the northeastern states of India.

Aspects of Hinduism continue in Burma today, even in the majority Buddhist culture. For example, the nat Thagyamin, who is widely worshipped and part of the Thingyan festival, has origins in the Hindu god Indra. Burmese literature has also been enriched by Hinduism, including the Burmese adaptation of the Ramayana, called Yama Zatdaw. Many Hindu gods are likewise worshipped by many Burmese people, such as Saraswati (known as Thuyathadi in Burmese), the goddess of knowledge, who is often worshipped before examinations; Shiva is called Paramizwa; Vishnu is called Withano, and others. Many of these ideas are part of thirty-seven Nat or deities found in Burmese culture.

== Demography ==
Historical Population (Census)
Year	Pop.	±%
1891	171,432	—
1901	285,484	+66.5%
1911	389,679	+36.5%
1921	484,432	+24.3%
1931	570,953	+17.9%
1973	115,685	−79.7%
1983	177,215	+53.2%
2010 (est).	820,000	+362.7%
2014	252,763	−69.2%
2020 (est.)	890,000	+252.1%
Source: 2014 Myanmar Census Report: Religion (Vol. 2-C) and UNFPA

The actual population of Hindus is not accurately reflected in census data. According to the 2014 Myanmar census, it was practised by only 0.5% of the population of Myanmar, or about 252,763 people. However, regions such as Rakhine, Kayin, and Kachin states were not included, meaning the figures are incomplete. In the 2024 census, around 32 million people were counted directly, while an additional 19 million were estimated using remote sensing technology in areas where enumeration was not possible, meaning the figures are again incomplete. Of the enumerated population, 189,718 stated Hinduism.

The Pew Research Center estimated 820,000 to 840,000 practising Hindus in 2010. The Pew report used evidence of undercounting to make adjustments to the estimated population. In 2020, the UNFPA estimated 1.7% of the population of Myanmar, or about 890,000 people, practised Hinduism.

=== Population by State/Region ===
Population of Hindus by State/Region, according to the 2014 census.

State/Region	Hindus %
Bago	2%
Mon	1%
Yangon	1%
Kayin	0.6%
Rakhine	0.5%
Kachin State	0.4%
Tanintharyi	0.2%
Mandalay	0.2%
Kayah	0.1%
Magway	0.1%
Sagaing	0.1%
Ayeyarwady Region	0.1%

== Ethnicity ==
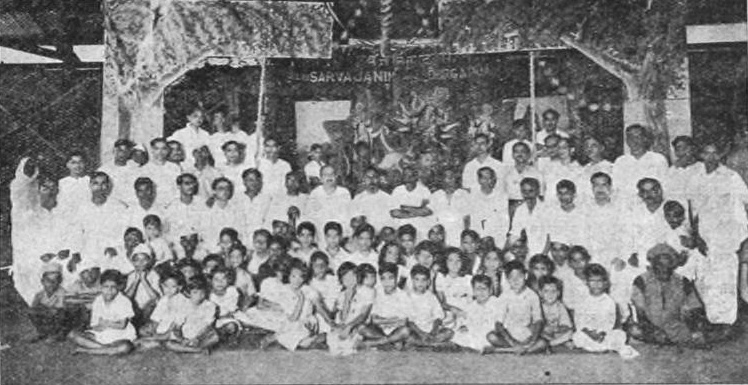
Bengali Hindus gather for Durga Puja festival in Rangoon, c. 1941-42

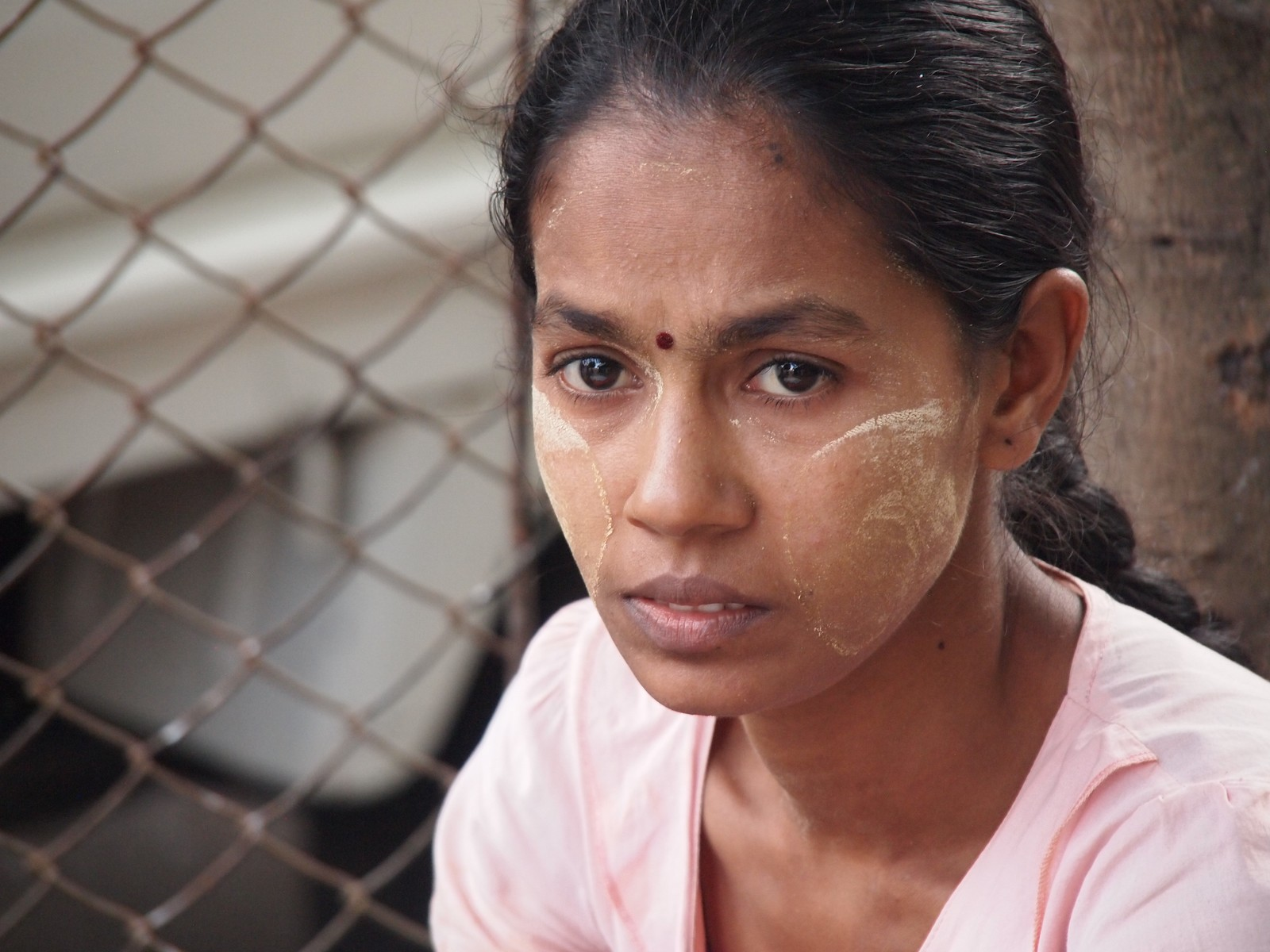
A Burmese-Tamil Hindu woman wearing Bindi (Pottu in Tamil), which is similar to the Thanakha worn by ethnic Burmese.

Predominantly, Burmese Indians make up Myanmar's population of Hindus. The practice of Hinduism among Burmese Indians is also influenced by Buddhism. In addition to Hindu deities, the Buddha is also worshiped and many Hindu temples in Myanmar house statues of the Buddha. The Burmese Indians include Myanmar Tamils, Bengalis, Odias etc.

The majority of the Meitei (or Manipuri) in Myanmar practice Hinduism. They are descendants of forced labourers taken from Manipur during the Manipuri–Burmese war from 1819 to 1825. Manipuris are concentrated in about 13 villages in the Mandalay, Sagaing and Amarapura areas. Manipuri settlements are also found along the Ningthi river, and the areas sandwiched between the river and the boundary of Manipur.

Many Nepali-speaking Burmese Gurkha in Myanmar also practice Hinduism. Burmese Gurkha came along with the British Army during the colonial period. There are approximately 250 Hindu Temples built by Burmese Gurkha in and across the country, of which 30 temples are in the Mandalay Region of Mogok City alone. Apparently, there are three to five temples that are over 100 years old. A small minority of Bengali Hindus also practice Hinduism.

Ethnic data was last collected in Myanmar for the 1983 Census, and the census department didn't publish stats related to ethnicity after that. Back in 1983, there were 428,428 Indians, 42,140 Pakistanis, 567,985 Rohingya and 28,506 Nepalis. Due to the mutual overlap in religious traditions, it is possible that some of the Hindus among these ethnicities reported as Buddhist during the 1983 Census. This may explain the low number of Hindus reported in 1983 (177,215).

As per the 1983 Census report, among the ethnic Indians, 33.64% reported themselves as Hindu, 32.71% as Muslim, 27.10% as Buddhist, 4.44% as Christian and 2.10% as Others. Among the ethnic Burmese, the census reported three thousand Hindus. Out of the 174,401 Hindus reported in 1983, the ethnicity was as follows: Indian - 143,545, Chinese - 43, Mixed race - 4,882, Pakistani - 567, Bangladeshi - 865, Nepalese - 17,410, Other foreigners - 679, Kachin - 48, Kayah - 3, Karen - 55, Chin - 155, Burmese - 2,988, Mon - 27, Rakhine - 99, Shan - 69 and other indigenous - 2,966.

== Contemporary status ==
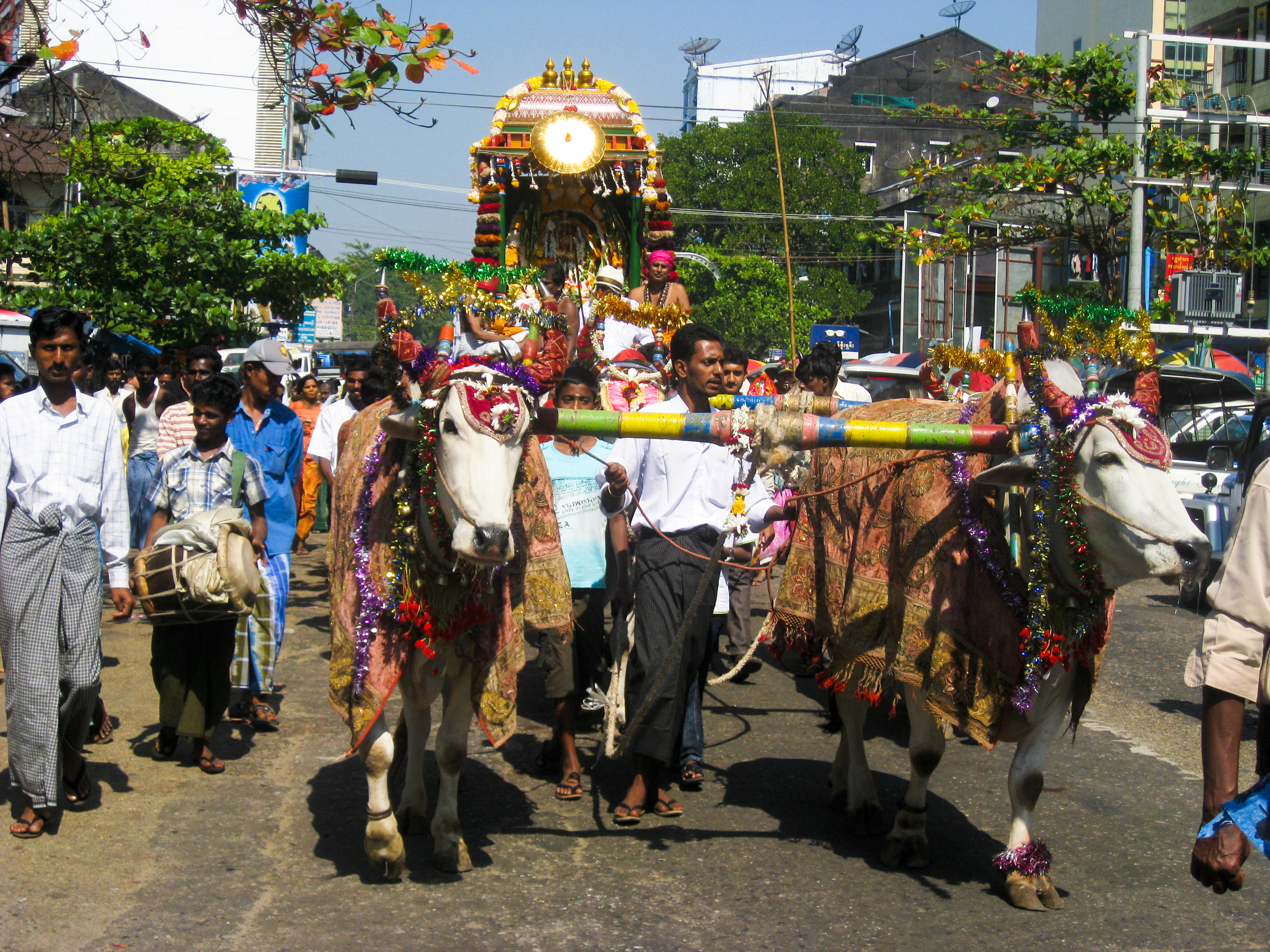
Hindu temple procession in Yangon, Myanmar.

Aspects of Hinduism continue in Burma today, even in the majority Buddhist culture. For example, Thagyamin is worshipped, whose origins are in the Hindu god Indra. Burmese literature has also been enriched by Hinduism, including the Burmese adaptation of the Ramayana, called Yama Zatdaw. Many Hindu gods are likewise worshipped by many Burmese people, such as Saraswati (known as Thuyathadi in Burmese), the goddess of knowledge, who is often worshipped before examinations; Shiva is called Paramithwa; Vishnu is called Beithano, and Ganesha is known as Mahapeinne Nat. Many of these ideas are part of thirty seven Nat or deities found in Burmese culture.

In modern Myanmar, most Hindus are found in the urban centres of Yangon and Mandalay. Ancient Hindu temples are present in other parts of Burma, such as the 11th century Nathlaung Kyaung Temple dedicated to Vishnu in Bagan.

ISKCON (Hare Krishna) has a presence in Myanmar. The largest Hare Krishna community is in Myitkyina, which has about 400 followers.

=== Public holidays ===
Deepavali is a public holiday in Myanmar.

=== Persecution of Hindus ===
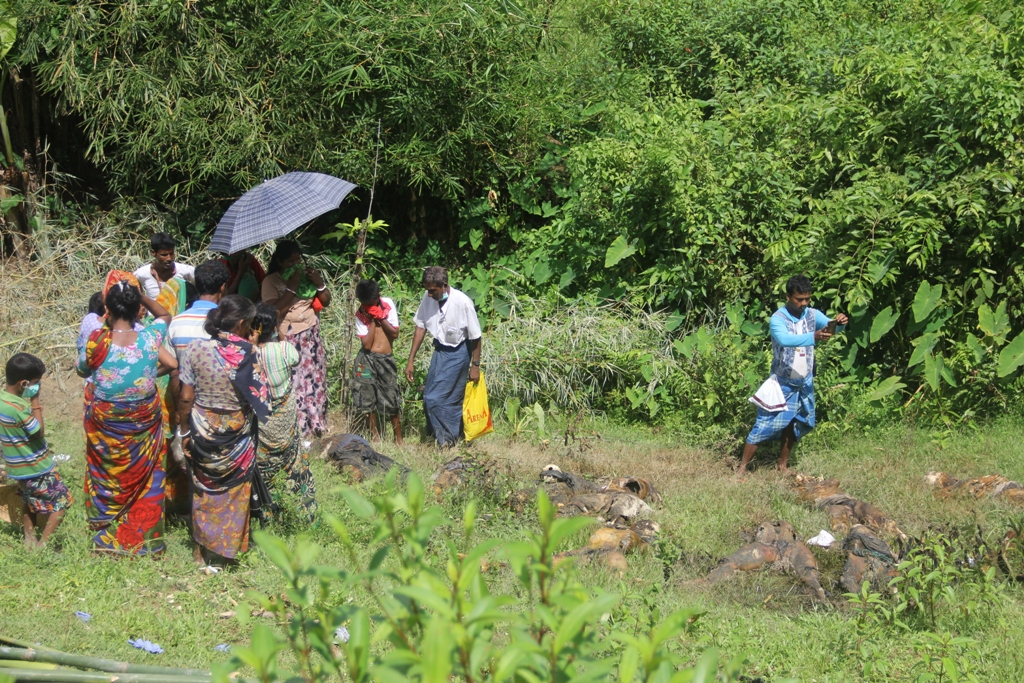
Hindu villagers gather to identify the corpses of family members who were killed in the Kha Maung Seik massacre.

After independence from Britain, the Burma Socialist Programme Party under Ne Win adopted xenophobic policies and expelled 300,000 Indian ethnic people (many of whom were Hindus and included Sikhs, Buddhists, and Muslims), along with 100,000 Chinese, from Burma between 1963 and 1967.

On 25 August 2017, the villages in a cluster known as Kha Maung Seik in northern Maungdaw District of Rakhine State in Myanmar were attacked by Rohingya Muslims of Arakan Rohingya Salvation Army (ARSA). This was called Kha Maung Seik massacre. Amnesty International said that about 99 Hindus were killed in that day. It was reported that the discovery of mass graves containing Hindu villagers were seized upon by the Myanmar military as evidence against the Rohingya, with critics and human rights observers raising concerns that the military used the killings to deflect international scrutiny from its own crackdown on the Rohingya population. These Rohingya Hindus identify themselves as Chittagonian, fearing anti-Rohingya sentiment.

Hindus in Myanmar have faced growing, organized discrimination under the military junta following the 2021 Myanmar coup d'état. Hindu minority groups have mobilized politically, frustrated by ethnic and religious targeting, including some appealing directly to the Indian government urging a halt to New Delhi’s support for Myanmar’s military and to be included in India's Overseas Citizen of India program as a protective measure. However, discrimination against Hindus is not as severe as discrimination against other religious minorities, in part due to the religious similarities between Hinduism and the majority religion of Buddhism. A lot of discrimination is also influenced by cultural differences.

On New Year's Eve 2025, a drone strike killed seven Hindus when it hit a Hindu temple Phyu Township, Bago Region. The attack targeted the 50-year-old Shri Maa Mansa Temple in Ran Na Gar village. Hindu organizations and anti-junta groups accused the Tatmadaw of deliberately targeting a predominantly Hindu area.

== Hindu organisations and temples ==
Myanmar Hindu Central Council and Sanatan Dharma Swayamsevak Sangh are the two largest Hindu organizations in Myanmar.

All Myanmar Gurkha Hindu Religious Association is another Hindu organisation representing Gurkha Hindus. ISKCON has 12 centres in Myanmar and a school in Zayyawadi, which provides religious education to brahmacharis

=== Temples ===
- Nanpaya Temple
- Nathlaung Kyaung Temple
- Shri Kali Temple, Burma
- Sri Varatha Raja Perumal Temple
- Shree Maha Lakshmi Temple
- Sri Kali Amman Temple
- Kartayri Temple
- Sri Radha Mandalayshwar Temple
- Shree Ram Temple
- Sri Ganesh Temple

== See also ==
- Hinduism in Bangladesh
- Hinduism in India
- Hinduism in West Bengal
- Hinduism in Cambodia
- Hinduism in Thailand
- Religion in Myanmar
- Burmese Indians
- Bengali Hindus in Myanmar
