= Myanmar Tamils =

Ethnic community

Myanmar Tamils மியான்மர் தமிழர்கள் / பர்மா தமிழர்கள்
Total population
- 1,000,000 - 1,500,000; 2.5 - 3.0% of the Burmese population

Regions with significant populations
- Mainly in Lower Burma and Mandalay

Languages
- Burmese, Tamil

Religion
- Majority: Hinduism; Minority: Christianity · Buddhism · Islam

Related ethnic groups
- Tamils, Sri Lankan Tamils, Indian Tamils of Sri Lanka, Malaysian Tamils, Singapore Tamils and Tamil diaspora

Myanmar Tamils or Burmese Tamils are people of ethnic Tamil ancestry who reside in Myanmar. Tamils form the majority of Indians in Myanmar (Burma).

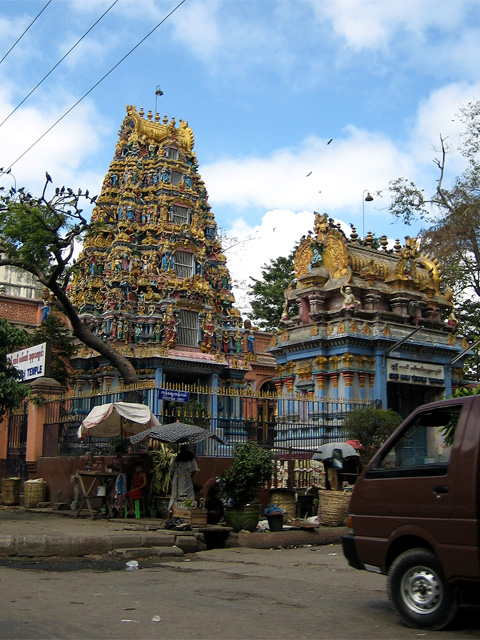
Shri Kali Temple, Burma, a Tamil Hindu temple with Dravidian architecture in Yangon

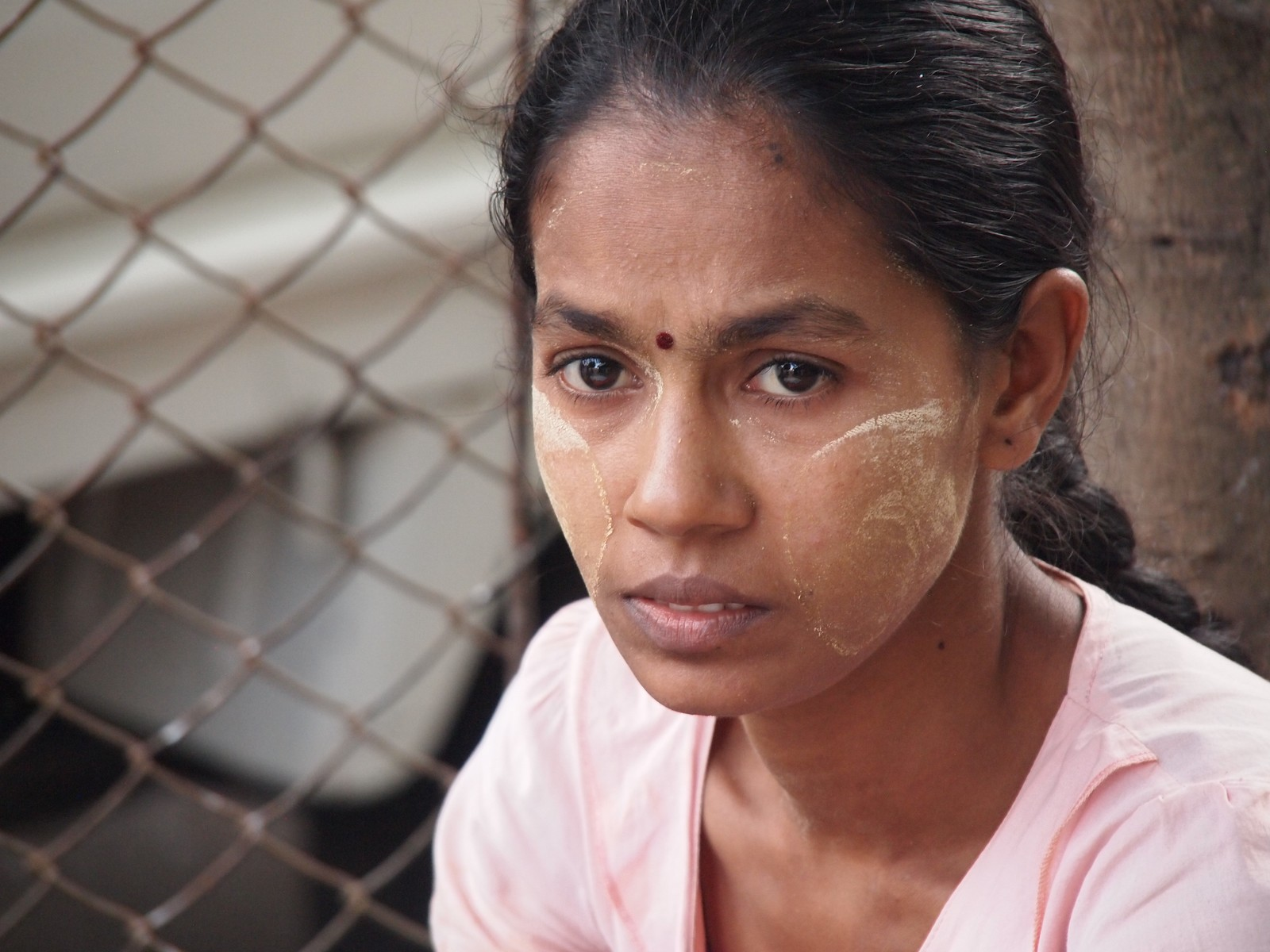
A Burmese-Indian Hindu woman wearing Pottu/Bindi and Thanaka which is worn by ethnic Burmese.

Tamils had the earliest contact with Myanmar during the first or second century CE. The Tamil Chola empire had trade relationships with various Burmese kingdoms. The massive Tamil migration to Myanmar began during the British colonial era. Historically, Burmese Tamils made their livelihoods as merchants, traders, and shopkeepers as well as manual laborers such as indentured servants (pejoratively called "coolies"); dockers, municipal workers, rickshaw drivers, and pony cart drivers. They were also heavily represented in certain professions such as civil servants, university lecturers, pharmacists, opticians, lawyers, engineers, and doctors. According to a report from 1966, there were 200,000 Tamils in Myanmar. Since the Second World War, the number of Tamils has declined dramatically and many fled back to India and other countries such as Malaysia and Singapore. The Burma Bazaar in Tamil Nadu was set up in 1969 by Myanmar Tamil refugees.

Between 1940 and 1942, many Malaysian and Myanmar Tamils were forced by Japanese occupiers to labour on a 415 kilometres (258 mi) railway track between Thailand and Burma. Over 150,000 Tamils died during the project due to venomous animals, illnesses, exhaustion and Japanese torture.

The majority of Tamils in Myanmar were Hindu before converting into Buddhism and Christianity, however, even today a significant population still follows it and there are many Tamil Hindu temples in and around Yangon (Rangoon) as well as in Lower Burma. Many Myanmar Tamils have a Burmese name and some don't speak much Tamil, but they work to preserve their Tamil identity. The Tamil community sometimes faces discrimination in Myanmar but much less so than the Rohingya people and Muslims.

After he seized power through a military coup in 1962, General Ne Win ordered a large-scale expulsion of Tamils. Although many Tamils had been living in Burma for generations and had integrated into Burmese society, they became a target for discrimination and oppression by the junta. This, along with a wholesale nationalisation of private ventures in 1964, led to the emigration of over 300,000 ethnic Tamils from Burma. Many Tamils returned and were given 175 kyat for their trip to India. This caused a significant deterioration in Indian-Burmese relations and the Indian government arranged ferries and aircraft to fly ethnic Tamils (and other ethnic Indians) out of Burma.

== See also ==
- Tamils
- Burmese Indians
- Hinduism in Myanmar
