= Burmese Indians =

Ethnic community

Total population
- 2,000,000 - 2,500,000; 4.5% of the Burmese population

Regions with significant populations
- Yangon, Mandalay, Taunggyi, Myitkyina

Languages
- Burmese, Tamil (majority), Telugu, Meitei (Manipuri), Bengali, Gujarati, Odia, Hindustani, Chittagonian

Religion
- Majority: Hinduism: Minority: Christianity; Buddhism; Islam; Sanamahism; Sikhism; Jainism

Related ethnic groups
- Malaysian Indians, Singaporean Indians

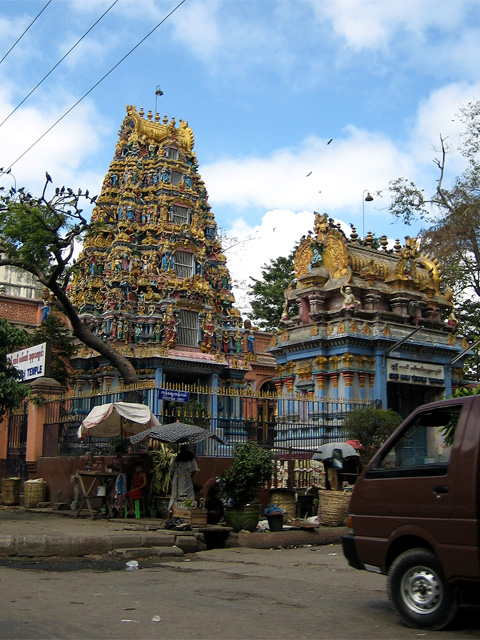
Shri Kali Temple, Burma, a Hindu temple with Dravidian architecture in Yangon

Burmese Indians are a group of people of Indian origin who live in Myanmar (Burma). The term 'Burmese Indian' refers to a broad range of people from South Asia, most notably from present-day countries such as India and Bangladesh. While Indians have lived in Burma for many centuries, most of the ancestors of the current Burmese Indian community emigrated to Burma from the start of British rule in the mid-19th century to the separation of British Burma from British India in 1937. During colonial times, ethnic Indians formed the backbone of the government and economy, serving as soldiers, civil servants, merchants, moneylenders, mobile laborers and dock workers. A series of anti-Indian riots in the 1930s and mass emigration at the onset of the Japanese invasion of Burma in 1942 were followed in the 1960s by the forced migration of hundreds of thousands of ethnic Indians, exacerbated by internal conflict in Myanmar.

Burmese Indians today are estimated to account for approximately 5% (about 2.0–2.5 million people) of the population of Burma and are concentrated largely in the two major cities (Yangon and Mandalay) and former colonial towns (Pyin U Lwin and Kalaw). They wield considerable influence and control over the Burmese economy and have a major socio-cultural presence within the country. The well-known Burmese Indians have included S N Goenka, a practitioner and teacher of vipassanā meditation and Helen, a Bollywood film actress of Anglo-Burmese descent.

== Etymology ==
In the Burmese language, Indians are typically called kalar (ကုလား, spelt kula:). The origins of the term itself are disputed. The Myanmar Language Commission officially traces the etymology of the word kalar to the Pali term kula (ကုလ), which means "noble", "noble race", or "pure. " This term was particularly used for Buddhist people. Folk etymology ascribes the origins of this term to a calque of two Burmese words: ကူး+ လာ (lit. "to cross over [from the sea]"), although this etymology has no scholarly basis. The term kalar also phonetically resembles the word for "black" in several Indic languages, including Hindi and Urdu (cf. Sanskrit kāla).

The Burmese language term kalar has been borrowed into a number of regional languages, including Shan (ၵလႃး, kala), Mon (ဂလာ, h'lea), S'gaw Karen (kola), and Khmer (កុឡា, kola). The Khmer term kola refers to the Kula people, a diverse community of migrants from present-day Shan State.

The term kalar has a long history; it is attested in Pagan Kingdom stone inscriptions dating to the 1100s, and was the name of a prominent 17th century Burmese historian, U Kala. During the pre-colonial era, Westerners, including those from the Indian subcontinent, the Middle East, and Europe, were collectively known as kalar, an exonym used by Burmese speakers. For instance, kalaphyu (ကုလားဖြူ, lit. 'white kalar') or bayinngyi kalar (ဘရင်ဂျီကုလား, lit. 'Frank kalar') were used as Burmese exonyms for Europeans. To this day, the word kalar features in many Burmese compound words, including kalahtaing (ကုလားထိုင်, lit. 'kalar seat' or 'chair') and kala be (ကုလားပဲ, lit. 'kalar bean' or 'chickpea')" By 1886, the conventional use of kalar in reference to a "native of continental India" was documented in dictionaries. Burma was administered as a part of British India for the majority of its time under British occupation between 1826 and 1948. Colonial exploitation during British Burma engendered nationalist and anti-Indian sentiment among locals, which was reinforced in the use of kalar as an exonym with negative connotations.

The term kalar is now considered pejorative by some members of the Burmese Indian community. In 2017, following the Rohingya genocide, the social media company Facebook added kalar to its censored words, creating collateral censorship for related words like chair and chickpea.

== History ==
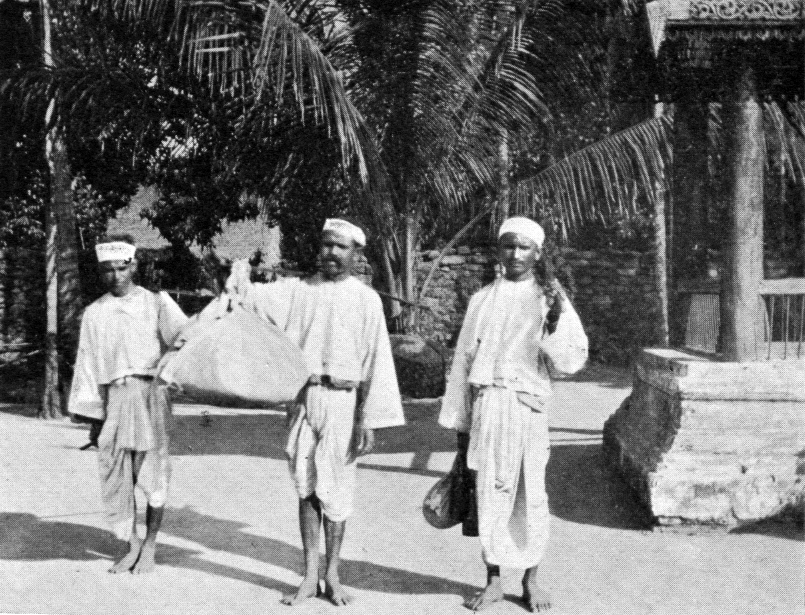
Brahmins in British Burma, circa 1900

=== Indian immigration ===
Before the British conquest, the Indians in Lower Burma primarily engaged in trade. The small Indian community was located almost wholly in during and preceding eras. After 1852, they migrated to Lower Burma because of the jobs available in the expanding economy and the new provincial bureaucracy of the British Raj. Their population rapidly rose from 37,000 in 1871 in Lower Burma to 297,000 in 1901, with 86% being born outside Burma by that year. Most Indians were from Madras Presidency and Bengal Presidency. Over 60% in the last decades of the 19th century were from Madras (present Chennai). 30% were from Bengal in 1881 and 25% in 1901.

There were no effective curbs on Indian immigration until the eve of World War II despite the implementation of the Government of Burma Act. By 1931, there were more than one million Indians in Burma, about 7% of the population, and were mostly concentrated in Lower Burma. The census of 1931 enumerated 1,017,825 Indians in Burma with 617,521 born in India. Per the census of 1931, the total population of Rangoon was 400,415, of which 212,929 were Indians. They comprised 2.5% of population in Upper Burma and 10.9% in Lower Burma.

The majority of Indians arrived in Burma whilst it was part of British India. Starting with the annexation of Tenasserim and Western Burma after the First Anglo-Burmese War, a steady stream of Indians moved to Burma as civil servants, engineers, river pilots, soldiers, indentured labourers, and traders. Following the annexation of Upper Burma in 1885, numerous infrastructure projects started by the British colonial government and increases in rice cultivation in the delta region caused an unprecedented economic boom in Burma that drew many Indians, particularly from southern India, to the Irrawaddy Delta region.

=== Anti-Indian sentiments ===
After the First World War, anti-Indian sentiments began to rise for a number of reasons. The number of ethnic Indians was growing rapidly (almost half of Yangon's population was Indian by the Second World War). Indians played a prominent role in the British administration and became the target of Burmese nationalists. Racial animosity toward Indians because of their skin colour and appearance also played a role. Meanwhile, the price of rice plummeted during the economic depression of the 1930s and the Chettiar from South India, who were prominent moneylenders in the rice belt, began to foreclose on land held by native Burmese.

In May 1930, a British firm of stevedores at the port of Rangoon employed Burmese workers in an attempt to break a strike organised by its Indian workers. When, on 26 May, the strike ended and the Indians returned to work, clashes developed between the returning Indian workers and the Burmese workers who had replaced them. The clashes soon escalated into large-scale anti-Indian riots in the city. Over 200 Indians were killed and their bodies flung into the river. Authorities ordered the police to fire upon any assembly of five or more who refused to lay down their arms, under Section 144 of the Criminal Procedure Code. Within two days the riot spread throughout the country to locations such as Maymyo.

=== The Second World War and after ===
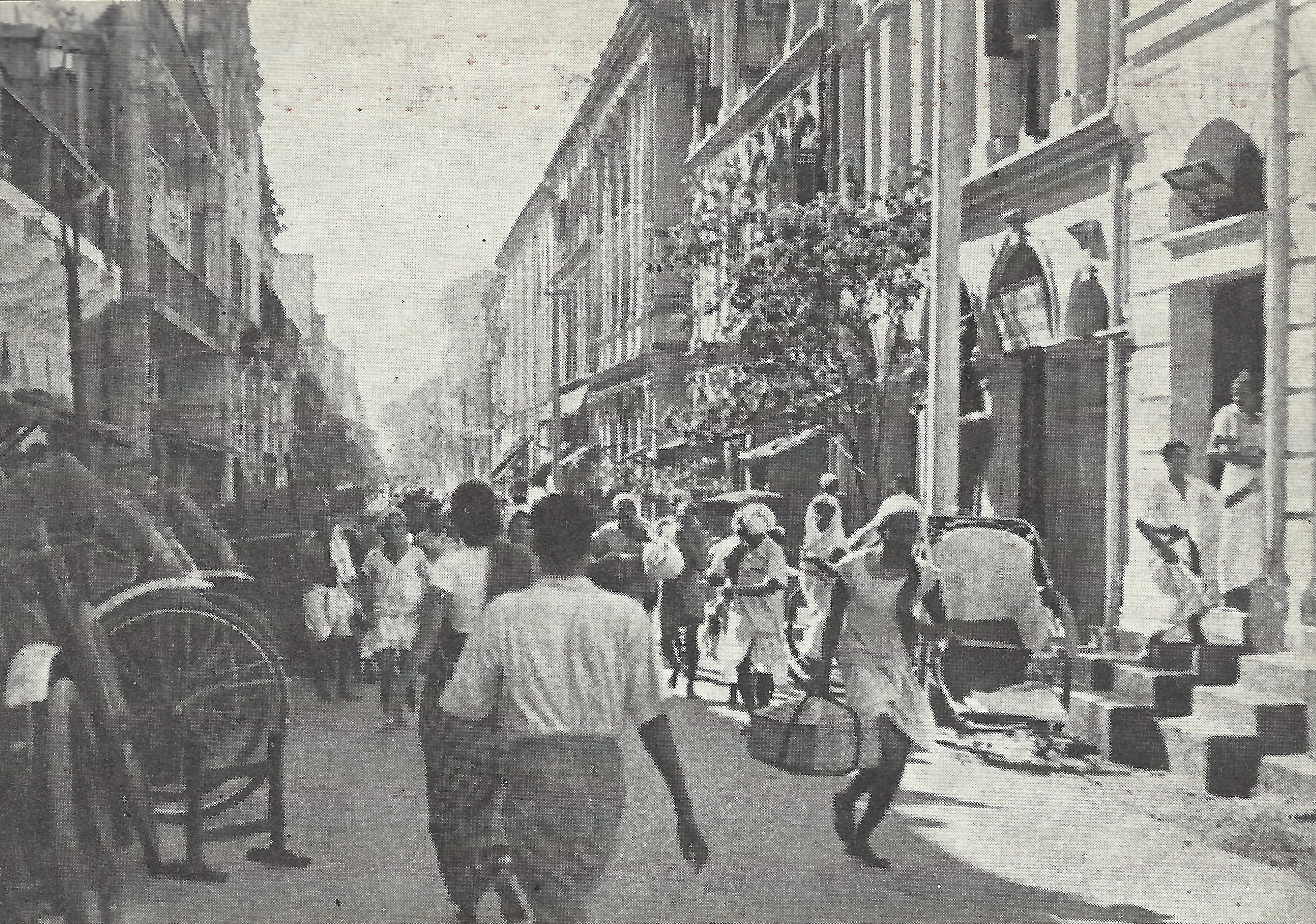
Indians on 39th Street, Rangoon, leaving Burma in the wake of the Japanese bombing December 1941

At the start of World War II, almost half of Rangoon's (modern-day Yangon) population was Indian, and about 16% of the population of Burma was ethnically Indian. As a consequence of the Japanese invasion of 1942, half a million members of the Indian community fled Burma overland into Assam, largely on foot. The refugees suffered terribly and thousands died. Some of the Indian community remained in Burma during the war; others returned after the war, although many never did. After independence, Burmese law treated a large percentage of the Indian community as 'resident aliens.' Though many had long ties to Burma or were born there, they were not considered citizens under the 1982 Burma citizenship law which restricted citizenship for groups immigrating before 1823.

After he seized power through a military coup in 1962, General Ne Win ordered a large-scale expulsion of Indians. Although many Indians had been living in Burma for generations and had integrated into Burmese society, they became a target for discrimination and oppression by the junta. This, along with a wholesale nationalisation of private ventures in 1964, led to the emigration of over 300,000 ethnic Indians from Burma. Indian-owned businesses as well as Burmese businesses were nationalised based on the ideology of "Burmese way to Socialism". Many Indians left for India and were given 175 kyat for their trip to India. This caused a significant deterioration in Indian-Burmese relations and the Indian government arranged ferries and aircraft to lift Burmese of Indian ethnicity out of Burma.

== Culture ==
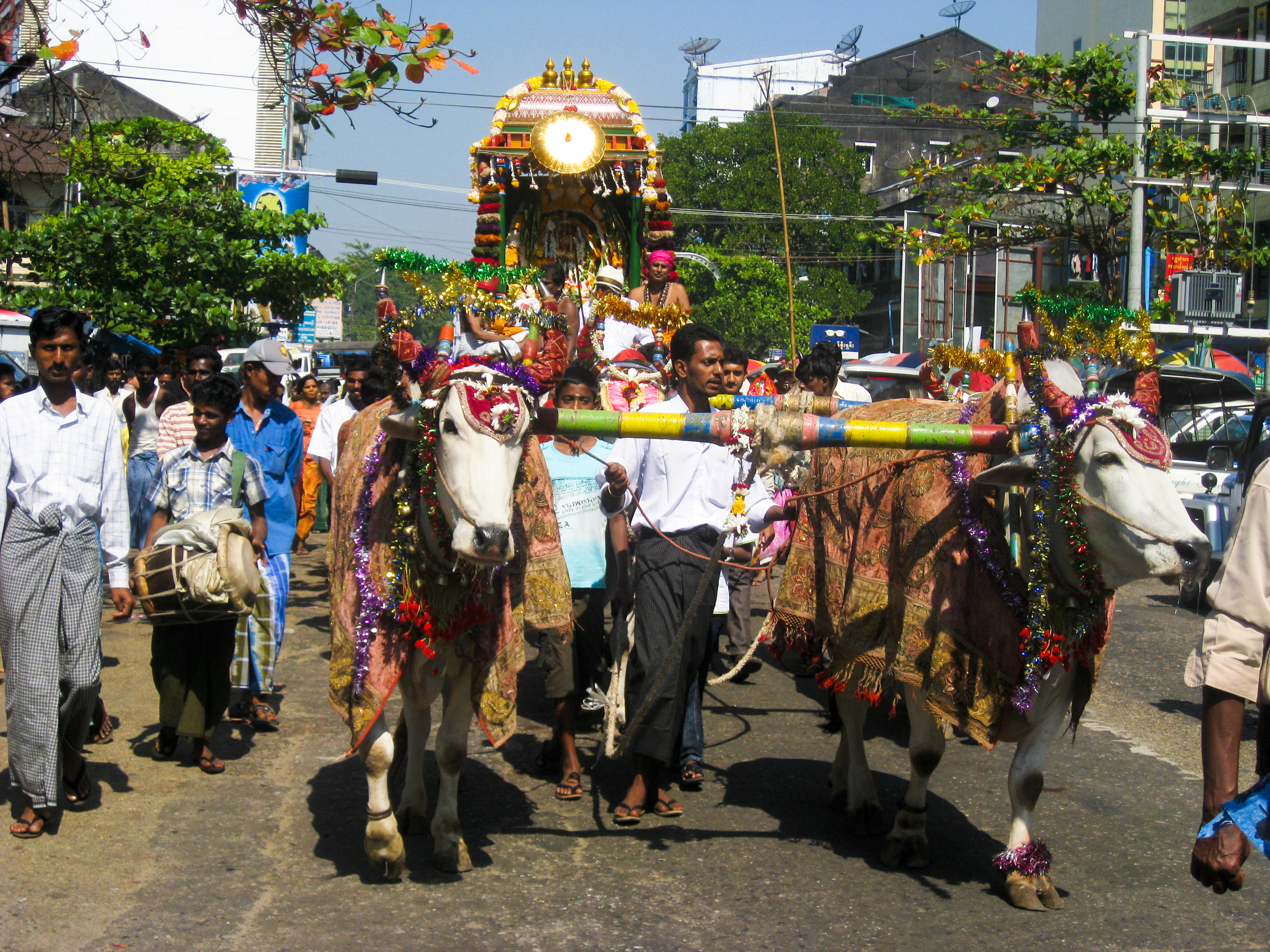
A Hindu temple procession in Yangon

India has been particularly influential in Burmese culture as the cradle of Buddhism, and ancient Hindu traditions can still be seen in Brahmans presiding over important ceremonies such as weddings and ear-piercings but most notably in Thingyan, the Burmese New Year festival. The Burmese poetry tradition of niti (notably the Dhammaniti) also has Indian origins. Traditions of kingship including coronation ceremonies and formal royal titles as well as those of lawmaking were also Hindu in origin. Many Burmese dishes and breads came as a result of Indian influence, prominently reflected in the Burmese version of Indian biryani.

Burmese Indians came from various groups from different parts of India, including Tamils (majority) and also minority groups such as Telugus, Bengalis, Hindustani speakers, Gujaratis and Punjabis. Today they form approximately 2% (about 950,000) of the population, according to the CIA World Factbook 2006, although exact figures do not exist due to uncertainties over census results and methods in Myanmar. Disaffected young Indians often flee the cities and join ethnic resistance movements. The All Burma Muslim Union, whose members consist largely of Muslims of Indian origin, is routinely labelled by the government as "Muslim terrorist insurgents". It operates alongside the Karen National Union, which has a militant wing and, despite a swelling of its ranks following anti-Muslim riots in the eighties, remains a very minor force.

=== Religion ===
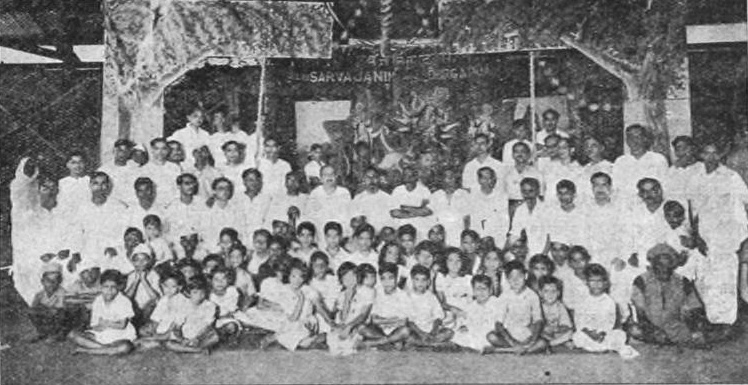
Bengali Hindus gather for Durga Puja festival in Rangoon, c.1941-42

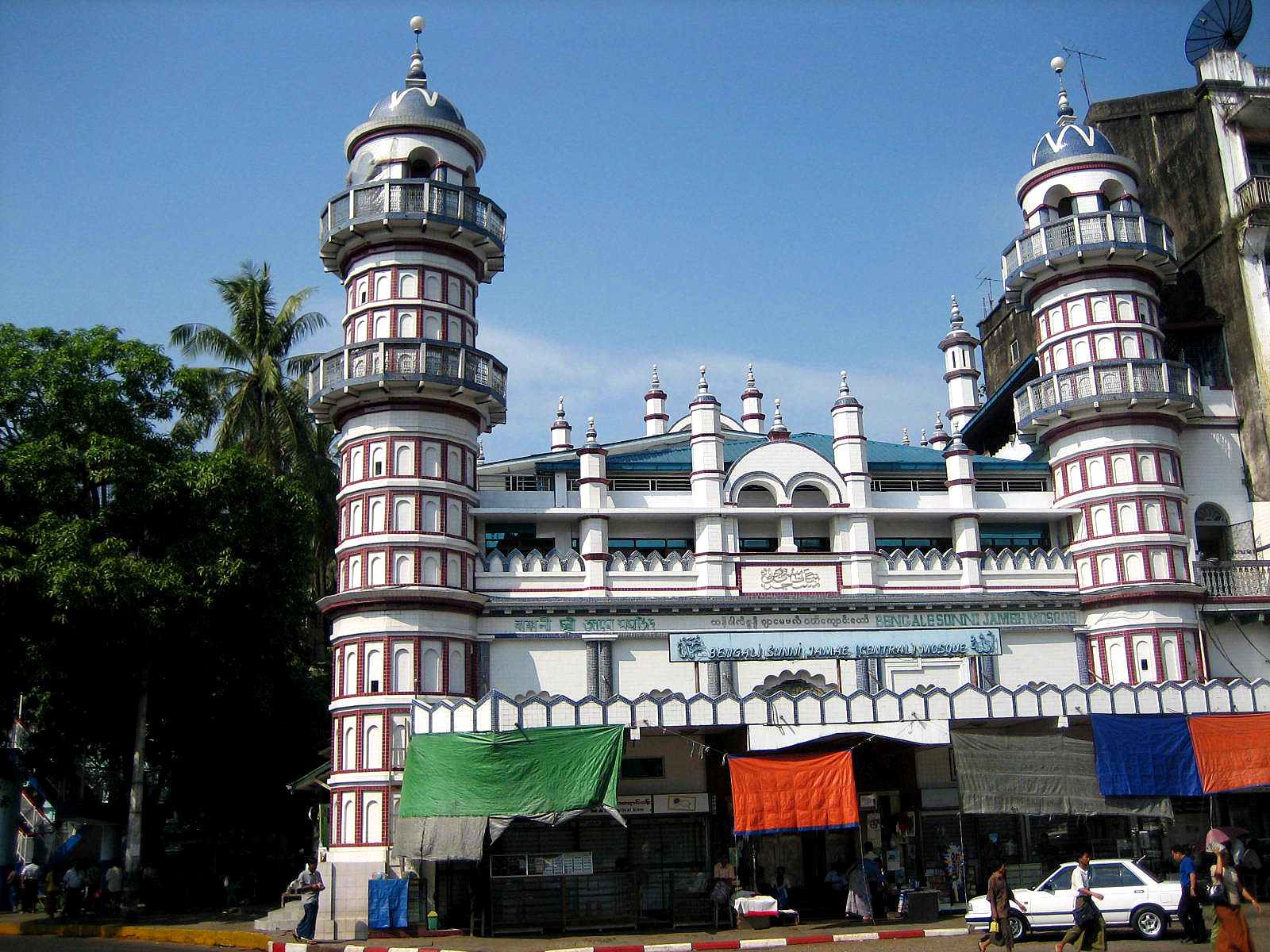
The Bengali Sunni Jameh Mosque, built in the colonial era, is one of many mosques in Yangon.

Burmese Indians practise Hinduism, Islam, Sikhism, Buddhism and Christianity.

Predominantly, Burmese Indians are Hindu. The practice of Hinduism among Burmese Indians is also influenced by Buddhism. In addition of Hindu deities, the Buddha is also worshiped and many Hindu temples in Myanmar house statues of the Buddha.

Burmese Muslims, some of them of mixed blood born of Burmese mothers and some of them with full Burmese blood, (ဗမာမူစလင်); with small numbers of Twelvers. The Burmese call them Zaydabayi.

The constitution grants limited rights to freedom of religion; however, some articles in the constitution, as well as other laws and policies, restrict those rights. In practice the government enforced those restrictions. "Muslims continue to experience the most severe forms of legal, economic, religious, educational, and social restrictions and discrimination". The military dictatorship rejects or ignores their requests when they want to build mosques in the country or to go abroad for religious ceremonies. Although there is limited freedom of religion in Burma, Muslims decided not to hold Eid al-Adha in 2012 due to Rakhine-Rohingya strikes in Rakhine State.

=== Languages ===
Burmese Indians are from an array of linguistic groups, mostly Tamils from Tamil Nadu. There is also significant population of the Meiteis (Manipuris), coming from Myanmar's western neighborhood Manipur state. Other minorities are Telugus from Andhra Pradesh and Marwaris from the Marwar region of India's Rajasthan state as well as Bengalis hailing from the Indian state of West Bengal as well as the present-day independent nation of Bangladesh. Prior to the expulsion of Indians, there were also Malayalis from Kerala, Odias from Odisha, Punjabis from the state of Punjab who are mostly Sikhs and two groups of Gujaratis, both Gujarati-speaking Parsis and Gujaratis proper who are mostly Hindus or Muslims by faith hailing from the state of Gujarat. All can and were able to communicate in Burmese due to years of assimilation and lack of education in languages other than English. Tamil is the most spoken Indian language in Myanmar. Other minority Indian languages are quite frequently used.

== Economic role ==
Historically, Burmese Indians have made their livelihoods as merchants, traders, and shopkeepers as well as manual labourers such as coolies, dockers, municipal workers, rickshaw men, pony cart drivers, malis and durwans. They were also heavily represented in certain professions such as civil servants, university lecturers, pharmacists, opticians, lawyers and doctors. They dominated several types of businesses such as auto parts and electrical goods, ironmongery and hardware, printing and bookbinding, books and stationery, paper and printing ink, tailoring and dry-cleaning, English tuition, and money lending. They traded in textiles, gold and jewellery, where the market was traditionally dominated by Burmese women. The Chettiars of Burma functioned as moneylenders and have been thought crucial in the growth of agricultural output of Burma during the colonial era. Today, many Indians live in central Rangoon on both sides of the Su Lei Paya Road and are largely involved in businesses, including restaurants, jewellery shops and money exchanges.

== Notable Burmese Indians and others ==
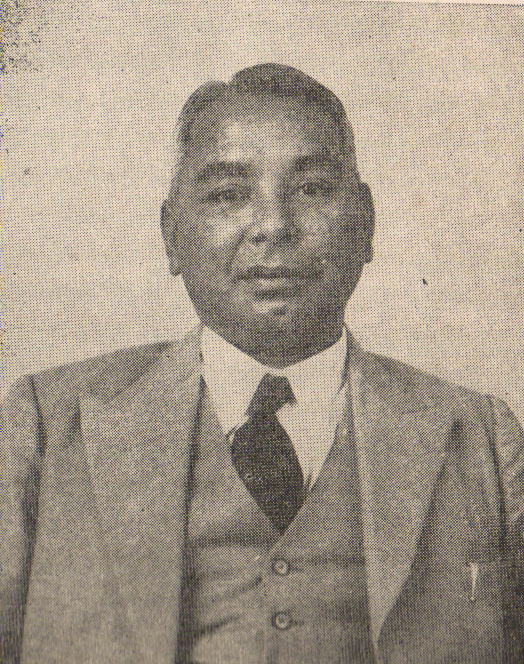
U Razak

- Alan Basil de Lastic - (1929–2000) was the fourth Archbishop of Delhi. He was born in Maymyo of mixed Burmese, Irish and French ancestry.
- Bhanumati Devi, an Odia film and theatre actress who was born in Burma.
- Captain Ohn Kyaw Myint, martyred after failed attempt of coup d'état
- Chakpa Makhao Ngambi, princess of Manipur and queen of Burma
- Daw Tint Tint Usha, the wife of former president of India, K. R. Narayanan
- Parshuram Verma, A social worker and leader for Burma Displaced Persons in India, dedicated his life to the welfare of Burmese Indians who migrated from Myanmar to India, particularly in Bihar, after 1972.
- Dr Nath (Tun Maung), a communist leader and founding member killed in the 1960s
- H N Goshal (Thakin Ba Tin), a leader of Communist Party of Burma and founding member from the 1940s to the 1960s, killed in an internal purge in 1967. was an ethnic Bengali.
- Helen of Bollywood, born Helen Jairag Richardson Khan in Rangoon on 14 July 1938, she fled to India during World War II and became famous for playing the vamp in Indian cinema.
- Karim Ghani was born in Sodugudi, Ilayangudi, a politician in South-East Asia of Indian origin. Before the Second World War Karim Ghani was a parliamentary secretary in Burma under Dr Ba Maw.
- S. N. Goenka, a vipassana meditation teacher (born 1924)
- Saya Rajan aka Aung Naing, a communist trade union leader captured in the 1950s
- Sultan Mahmud, Minister of Health of Burma from 1960 to 1962.
- T. S. S. Rajan, an Indian freedom fighter and Minister of Health in Madras Presidency from 1937 to 1940.
- Ko Ni, prominent Burmese lawyer and an expert on constitutional law, legal advisor to Aung San Suu Kyi until 2017 when he was assassinated.
- U. A. Khader (1935–2020) is a noted Malayali novelist
- U Razak (20 January 1898 – 19 July 1947; Arabic: Abdul Razak) Burmese politician
- Nalini Joshi, mathematician
- Dommeti Venkata Reddy(1853-1928), Rangoon Mayor and ship merchant from Amalapuram, Andhrapradesh, India.

== See also ==
- Anglo-Burmese
- Burmese Chinese
- Burmese community in India
- Greater India
- Indian people
- Indosphere
- List of ethnic groups in Burma
- Non-resident Indian and person of Indian origin
- Pakistanis in Burma
- Meitei people in Myanmar
- Burma Bazaar
