= Bengalis in Myanmar =

মিয়ানমারের বাঙালি Miẏānmārēr Bāṅgāli မြန်မာနိုင်ငံရှိ ဘင်္ဂါလီများ Mranma nuingngam shi Bhainggali
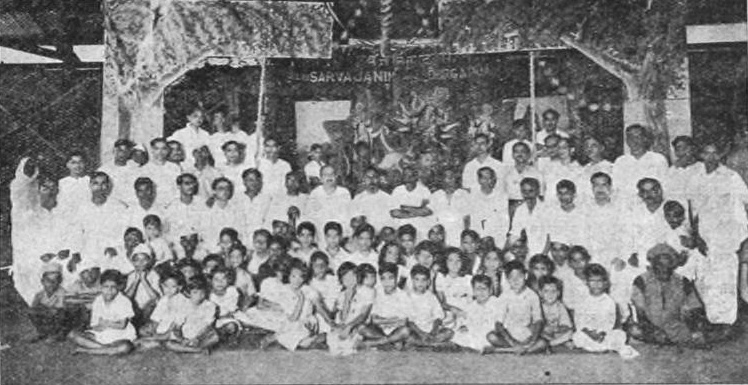
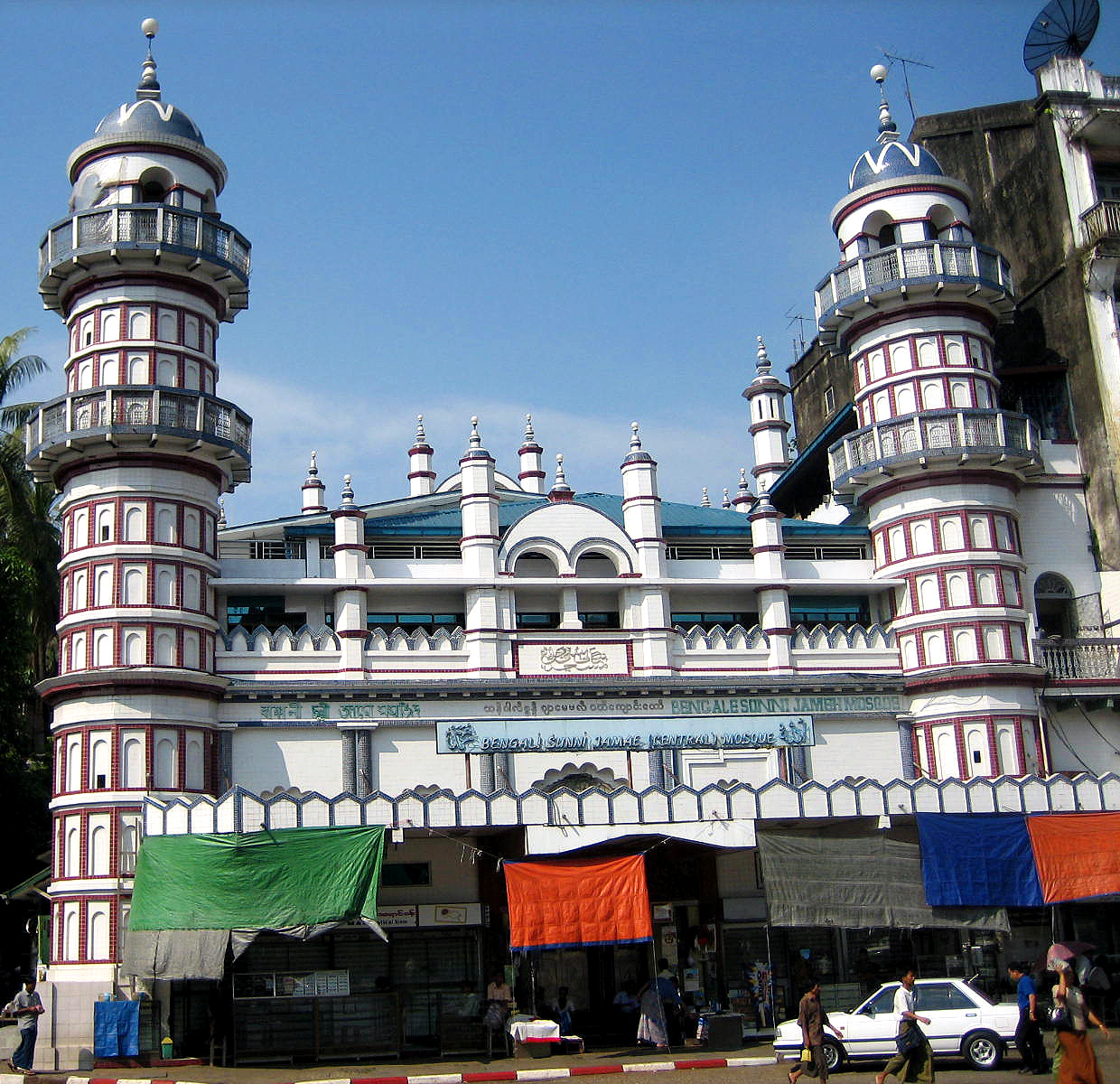
- Bengali Hindus gather for Durga Puja festival in Rangoon, c.1941-42 Bengali language (left of Burmese) above the entrance of the Bengali Sunni Jameh Mosque, Yangon

Total population
- 402,000

Languages
- Bengali, Chittagonian, Burmese, Rakhine

Religion
- Majority; Sunni Islam; Significant minority; Hinduism

Related ethnic groups
- Rohingya, Barua, Bengali diaspora

The history of the Bengalis in Myanmar dates back to the Middle Ages and 15th century. During the Mrauk-U Kingdom, which ruled Arakan, the kings had strong ties with the Bengal Sultanate. During this period, Bengali Muslims were brought to Arakan as soldiers, administrators, and artisans. The Arakanese kings brought Brahmins from Bengal as astrologers and Doms as cleaners of the pagoda compounds in Arakan. After the annexation of Burmese kingdom by the British, the Bengalis arrived in British Burma in various capacities. A large section came as white collared executives in the administration, while a smaller proportion came as labourers in various projects.

== Identity ==
According to historian and presidential adviser Thant Myint-U, at the start of the 20th century, Indians and Bengalis were migrating to Burma at a rate of at least 250,000 per year. This number climbed steadily, peaking in 1927 when 480,000 people arrived, making Rangoon the world’s busiest immigration port, surpassing even New York City. At the time, Burma’s population was just 13 million, making this influx proportionally equivalent to the UK taking in 2 million migrants annually today. By then, Indian immigrants formed the majority in major cities such as Rangoon, Akyab, Bassein, and Moulmein. From 1885 to 1937, Burma was a province of British India, before becoming a separate Crown colony. Under British rule, many Burmese felt powerless, responding with a racism fueled by both fear and a sense of superiority.

=== Bengali Muslims ===
The presence of Bengali Muslims in Myanmar is a controversial topic following the identity of Rohingya community. The re-establishment of the Arakanese throne by King Narameikhla (Min Saw Mon) in 1430, with military assistance from the Bengal Sultanate, marked the beginning of profound Bengal influence in Arakan province of Myanmar. Bengali Muslims, especially from Chittagong, held prominent positions such as wazirs (ministers), qadis (judges), and shabandars (port officials). The Chittagong area was under Arakanese rule for a long time. The renowned Bengali poet Alaol was enslaved during this period, later rising to prominence at the Arakanese court.

The most significant influx of Bengali Muslims occurred during the British colonial era, following the First Anglo-Burmese War in 1824. The British annexation of Arakan led to the encouragement of labor migration from Bengal to develop the fertile lands of the region. Bengali Muslims, primarily from the Chittagong area, migrated in large numbers to work as agricultural laborers, contributing to the economic development of Arakan. By 1872, the Muslim population in Sittwe District had increased to 58,255, and by 1911, it had risen to 178,642.

=== Bengali Hindus ===
In Myanmar, the citizenship issue of the Rohingyas has led to identity crisis among the Bengali Hindu population. While the Rohingyas prefer to use the term Rohingya to identify themselves, the Myanmar authorities insist on using the term Bengalis for the Rohingyas. As the Rohingyas are considered as illegal Bangladeshi immigrants, the Bengali Hindus in Rakhine State shun the usage of the term Bengali to identify themselves. They prefer to identify themselves as Burmese Hindus.

In the recent times, the Bengali Hindus have started wearing small armbands to distinguish themselves from the Rohingya. The Bengali Hindu women have started wearing bindis to distinguish themselves from the Rohingyas.

At present, the Bengali Hindu population is concentrated in the cities of Yangon and Sittwe and in some of the semi-urban and rural areas of Rakhine State. The estimated population quoted in various source range between 10,000 and 56,000. The Bengali Hindus are not recognized as full citizens as per the 1982 law, but are entitled to hold the ID Card for National Verification.

== Persecution ==
The term "Rohingya" is a subject of controversy in Myanmar, where the government does not recognize it and instead refers to the group as "Bengali" for both Bengali Muslims and Hindus, implying they are immigrants from Bangladesh. This stance is reflected in official statements and media guidelines that avoid using the term "Rohingya." However, internationally, the term is recognized, with various organizations acknowledging the group's identity and reporting on their challenges, including issues related to citizenship and displacement. This leded to the persecution of Bengali Muslims as Rohingya genocide.

During the 1920s, the Bengali Hindus constituted a thriving community in the urban centres like Rangoon, Mandalay, Mawlamyine, Bassein and Sittwe. Starting with the anti-Indian movements in the late 1930s, the Bengali Hindus began to leave British Burma in hundreds. After the independence and especially the 1962 coup, large numbers of Bengali Hindus left for India.

In 1962, after the coup, an estimated 300,000 Indians were forced to leave Burma. The repatriates included a significant number of Bengali Hindus of East Bengal origin. The Bengali Hindu returnees were settled in four camps in Kamarhati, Barasat, Bongaon and Hasnabad, in the 24 Parganas district of West Bengal.

== See also ==
- Kha Maung Seik massacre
- Bengali Hindu diaspora
- Bengali diaspora
