= Subodh Mukherjee (revolutionary) =

Communist revolutionary and activist in Burma

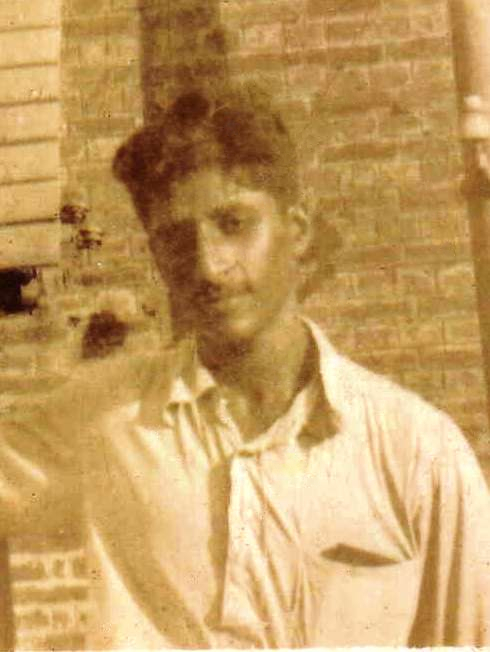
- Subodh Mukherjee in front of Barddhaman Junction railway station in 1940.
- Born: 1918; Jessore, British India
- Died: 1959 (aged 40–41); Burma
- Movement: Myanmar's communist movement

Subodh Chandra Mukherjee (1918–1959) was a communist leader of the Burmese Independence campaign of Bengali origin.

== Early life ==
Subodh Mukherjee was born in Jessore District, Bangladesh in 1918. His father was Debendranath Mukherjee and mother's name was Charubala Devi.

== Revolutionary activities ==
He was a member of Bengali Student Association. This association played a vital role in Burmese Independence and Chattagram Youth Revolt. Other important members of the Bengali Student Association were H. N. Goshal, Dr. Amar Nag, Barin De, Sadhon Banerjee, Gopal Munsi, Amar De. Mukherjee became an important leader of the Communist Party of Burma and Trade union movement of British Burma. He was also present in the foundation meeting of the party in 1940 along with Aung San, Thakin Soe, Than Tun. He was elected as the president of the All Burma Trade Union Congress and later became a prominent leader of Anti-Fascist People's Freedom League.

== Death ==
The Burmese Police had placed a bounty on his head for 1,00,000. He was assassinated in 1959 in Pegu Range area and beheaded by the army. His headless picture was published in the local newspapers of Rangoon.
