= Bengali Hindu diaspora =

Worldwide population of Bengali Hindus of Indian and Bengali origin

The Bengali Hindu diaspora is the worldwide population of the Bengali Hindus of Indian and Bangladeshi origin.

== History ==
In the modern era, the migration of the Bengali Hindus began during the British colonial era. The Bengali Hindu migrants to Assam were mostly government officials, doctors, lawyers, and teachers by profession. They also settled in parts of the present-day Indian states of Bihar and Jharkhand, which were at the time included in the Presidency of Bengal. After the partition of India and subsequent communal violence in East Pakistan and Bangladesh (such as during the 1971 Bangladesh genocide), millions of Bengali Hindu refugees migrated to Assam, Bihar, Jharkhand, Tripura, Odisha, Chhattisgarh, Maharashtra, Uttarakhand and the Andaman and Nicobar Islands. Over the years, professionals have migrated from Kolkata to cities like New Delhi, Mumbai, Bangalore and Pune, as well as overseas.

== Indian diaspora ==
=== Assam ===
The Barak Valley, comprising the present districts of Cachar, Karimganj and Hailakandi, is contiguous to Sylhet (Bengal plains), where the Bengali Hindus, according to historian J.B. Bhattacharjee, had settled well before the colonial period, influencing the culture of Dimasa Kacaharis. Bhattacharjee describes that the Dimasa kings spoke Bengali, and the inscriptions and coins written were in Bengali script. Migrations to Cachar increased after the British annexation of the region. The Bengali Hindus settled in the Brahmaputra Valley largely during the colonial period as professionals. After the Partition and especially after the genocide of 1950, Bengali Hindus of Sylhet immigrated to the Barak Valley. Later on, during the 1971 Bangladesh genocide, thousands of Bengali Hindus took refuge in Assam. The Bengali Hindu organizations estimate that there are approximately 6.5 million Bengali Hindus in the state. However ,different sources have varied estimates of the Bengali Hindu population in Assam.

Number of Bengali Hindus residing in Assam (2010-2019)
Source/claimed by	Population
Claimed by Assam marriage board.	3,000,000
Confusion, hope run high among Assam's Hindu Bengalis.	5,000,000
Claimed KMSS leader Akhil Gogoi.	10,000,000
Claimed AASU chief adviser Samujjal Bhattacharya.	7,000,000-7,200,000
BJP government estimation.	6,000,000
2016 Assam election assembly results.	6,000,000
Claimed by NDTV	5,620,000
Claimed by Assam Bengali Hindu organization (ABHO).	6,500,000-7,200,000
Claimed by The All Assam Bengali Hindu Association (AABHA)	7,802,000
Claimed by Times of India	7,500,000
Claimed by Daily O News	7,000,000
Claimed by The Wire	5,900,000-7,500,000
Claimed by The News Web	7,500,000
Claimed by The Hindu	7,801,250

=== Tripura ===
The non-tribal population of Tripura, the mostly Bengali-speaking Hindus and Muslims, constitutes more than two-thirds of the state's population. The resident and the migrant Bengali population benefited from the culture and language of the royal house of Tripura thanks to embracement of Hinduism and the adoption of Bengali as the state language by the Maharajahs of Tripura much before Indian independence. After the Partition of India and Tripura's accession to the Dominion of India, thousands of Bengali Hindus from eastern Bengal took refuge in Tripura. The influx of the Bengali Hindus increased during the Bangladesh Liberation War, when many Bengali Hindus were massacred in Bangladesh by the Pakistani occupation army. At present there are around 2.2 million Bengali Hindus in Tripura, making them the largest ethnic group in the state, constituting over 60% of the total population.

== Worldwide diaspora ==
=== Europe ===
The Bengali Hindus started migrating into the United Kingdom from colonial times. However, the majority of the immigrants settled in the UK in the latter half of the 20th century, mostly with white-collar jobs. The exact population of the Bengali Hindus is not maintained in the census records.

In Italy, the moderate community of Bengali Hindus celebrate Durga Puja in Bologna and Rome. There are around 15,000 Bengali Hindu families in Paris. Bengali Hindus began to migrate to Germany in the 1950s and the 1960s.

Notable Bengali Hindus in Europe include British Communist leader Rajani Palme Dutt, German politician Anita Bose Pfaff, German football manager Robin Dutt, and the richest hotelier of Sweden, Bicky Chakraborty.

=== North America ===
Bengali Hindus began to arrive in Canada in the 1970s. In 1991, there were an estimated 4,000 Bengali Hindus living in Canada, mainly from India. However, after the IT boom in the late 1990s, more and more professionals began to settle in Canada. According to the 2006 census, there are 52,130 Bengali Hindus in Canada. The Bengali Hindus are mostly concentrated in the cities of Toronto, Ottawa, Montreal, Edmonton, Calgary, Vancouver and Halifax.

The earliest Bengali Hindus in the United States were the revolutionaries fighting for Indian independence. They arrived in the first few decades of the twentieth century. Examples include Noni Gopal Bose, the father of Bose Corp's Amar Bose. In 1913, the Bengali Hindu Okhoy Kumar Mozumdar became the second Indian-born person to get U.S. citizenship after the Punjabi Sikh Bhagat Singh Thind, who was the first one to obtain it after the United States v. Bhagat Singh Thind court case. Later the citizenship was stripped from him for not being White/Caucasian. According to the 2006 census, there were around 33,400 Bengali Hindus of Indian origin in the United States.

=== Asia ===
The Bengali Hindu diaspora in Asia is distributed in two major regions, South East Asia and the Middle East. India had developed religious and economic ties with South East Asia since ancient times. This cultural cross exchange took place through the port of Tamralipta in Bengal. In the modern age, the emigration of Bengali Hindus to South East Asia has taken place since the colonial times. Famous Bengali Hindus from Myanmar include H. N. Goshal and Amar Nath, both of whom were foremost and important leaders of the Communist Party of Burma.

Bengali Hindus settled in present-day Myanmar, Singapore and Malaysia since the beginning of the 20th century. A small community of Bengali Hindus numbering around 1,600 lives in Thailand. The annual Durga Puja festival is celebrated in Bangkok.

=== Southeast Africa ===
The Bengali Hindu presence in South Africa is highlighted by the formation of the Bengali Association of South Africa (BASA), which revived the tradition of public celebrations of Durga Puja throughout the country with a four-day event ending with Devi Boron and Sindoor Khela rituals. Previously confined to Hindu temples built by the local community of Indian South Africans who descend from the very first group of Indian migrants arriving in 1860 as indentured labourers at Natal's sugar cane fields, this time BASA hosted the event at Marlboro Community Centre situated in the North of Johannesburg. One of the main highlights that delights the locals is the Dhunuchi Naach, mainly performed by married women, young girls and even a few young boys. Approximately 30-40 Bengali Hindu families across South Africa altogether formed the association and are maintaining this tradition till date.

There is also a significant presence of Bengali Hindus in Mauritius that is highlighted by the formation of the Bengali Association of Mauritius, a registered cultural and social organisation based in Quatre Bornes that aims to promote and preserve Bengali cultural heritage but also support social local causes in the country. The organisation holds the event of Kolkata-styled Durga Puja annually in designated Pandals of Quatre Bornes in collaboration with the Trimurty Society and also the one in Vacoas with the Ramakrishna Mission, where local Bengali Hindus together with broader Hindu communities celebrate by playing the traditional drumming instrument also called Dhak, performing the Dhunuchi Naach, making the Uludhoni sound to finally finishing it with Devi Boron and Sindoor Khela rituals.

== See also ==
- States of India by Bengali speakers
- East Bengali refugees
- Bengali Hindus
- Hindu diaspora
- Indian diaspora (Non-Resident Indians and People of Indian origin)
- Bangladeshi diaspora
- Bengali Hindus in Myanmar
- Bengali Hindu Americans
