= Ululation =

Long vocal sound resembling a howl

Ululation (/ˌjuːljʊˈleɪʃən, ˌʌl-/, from Latin ululo), trilling or lele, is a long, wavering, high-pitched vocal sound resembling a howl with a trilling quality. It is produced by emitting a high-pitched, loud voice accompanied by a rapid back-and-forth movement of the tongue and the uvula.

== Around the world ==
An Egyptian woman ululates after having cast her vote in the 2014 Egyptian presidential elections.

Video of ululation practiced by Assamese women in India

Ululation is practiced either alone or as part of certain styles of singing, on various occasions of communal ritual events (like weddings), used to express strong emotion.

Ululation is practiced in all parts of Africa, the Middle East, the Americas and as far east as Central and South Asia. It is also practiced in a few places in Europe among the diaspora community originating from these areas.

=== Middle East ===
Ululation is commonly used in Middle Eastern weddings. In the Arab world, zaghrouta (Arabic: زغروتة, romanized: zaghrūta, pl. زغاريت, zaghārīt) is a ululation performed to honor someone. For example, zaghareet are widely performed and documented in Egyptian movies featuring traditional weddings, dating back to the 1940s, in which women perform very long, very loud Egyptian-style ululations to celebrate the groom and bride. Another example of modern incorporation of ululations into traditional wedding songs can be found in Zaghareed, a collection of traditional Palestinian wedding songs reinterpreted and rearranged by Mohsen Subhi and produced in 1997 by the Palestinian National Music and Dance Troupe El-Funoun.

Ululations are a part of Kurdish culture. They are commonly heard during henna nights, weddings and Newroz as they are a display of celebration. Ululation also occurs among Mizrahi Jews during simcha (festive occasions) such as at the inauguration of a Torah scroll (hachnasat sefer Torah), brit milah (circumcision), communal celebrations, weddings, bar mitzvah celebrations, and most of all at henna celebrations. Recordings of various styles of ululations are commonly found in the music of artists performing Mizrahi styles of music.

Kel or kel keshidan is a form of ululation practiced in various regions of Iran, particularly in Mazanderan, and by Persians in Shiraz, in Fars province, and areas such as Abarkuh, in Yazd province. It is a vocal expression performed mainly by women during celebratory rituals, especially weddings. In traditional ceremonies, “Women who enter the house put their hands on their mouths and make special sounds called, ‘kel’ and ‘kel keshidan’.” This act is reciprocated by other women present and functions as both a greeting and a communal expression of joy.

As reflected in Iranian visual culture, including The Mare (1986) by ‛Alī Rizā Zhikān and the TV series Shahrzad (TV series), these practices also carry symbolic and narrative meanings: “As expressed in ritual verses such as those in The Mare, marriage is presumed to be lifelong, ending only in death. This temporality is both linear and gendered, positioning a girl’s life along a fixed path: from virginity to motherhood, and eventually, to death. This linearity is reinforced through gendered rituals—such as kil (ululation) sounds, sugar grinding, and symbolic acts— performed mostly by women, who accompany the bride through this transition.” In the ‛aqd scene, there are no agents or mediators facilitating her transition into wifehood: instead, she plays the daf and produces the celebratory kil (ululation) sounds herself – acts typically performed by others on behalf of the bride.” “After the clergyman departs, the couple celebrates by making music themselves – Hāniyah plays the daf and emits celebratory kil (ululation) sounds, actions typically performed by female guests or hired entertainers in traditional ceremonies.”

Shanbehzadeh Ensemble, founded in 1990 by Afro-Iranian musician Saeid Shanbehzadeh from Bushehr in southern Iran, is a musical group known for preserving and performing the traditional music, dance, and cultural practices of southwestern Iran and the Persian Gulf region. Their work incorporates Afro-Iranian heritage, especially through rhythmic percussion, dance, and vocal traditions such as ululation (kel/kil, kel keshidan), which is used both as a celebratory expression and as part of ceremonial performance.

=== Africa and Asia ===
In Ethiopia and Eritrea, ululation (called ililta) is part of a Christian religious ritual performed by worshipers as a feature of Sunday or other services in the Ethiopian Orthodox Tewahedo Church, Eritrean Orthodox Tewahedo Church, and some Ethiopian Evangelical Churches. Ililta is also used in Eritrean and Ethiopian music. In Somali, ululation is known as Alalaas and is widely used in music. In Hausa it is known as guda, in Zulu lilizela, in ukuyiyizela,, in Xhosa ukuyiyizela, in Tsonga nkulungwani and in Northern SiNdebele ukubulula. Ululation is incorporated into African musical styles such as Tshangani music, where it is a form of audience participation, alongside clapping and call-and-response.

In Tanzania, ululation is a celebratory cheer sound when good news has been shared, or during weddings, the welcoming of a newborn home, graduations and other festivals, and even in church when sermons are being delivered. In Swahili, it is known as vigelegele, and in Luo, it is known as udhalili. Generally, women exuberantly yell lililili in a high-pitched voices. Girls are usually proud of being able to ululate like their mothers and aunts.

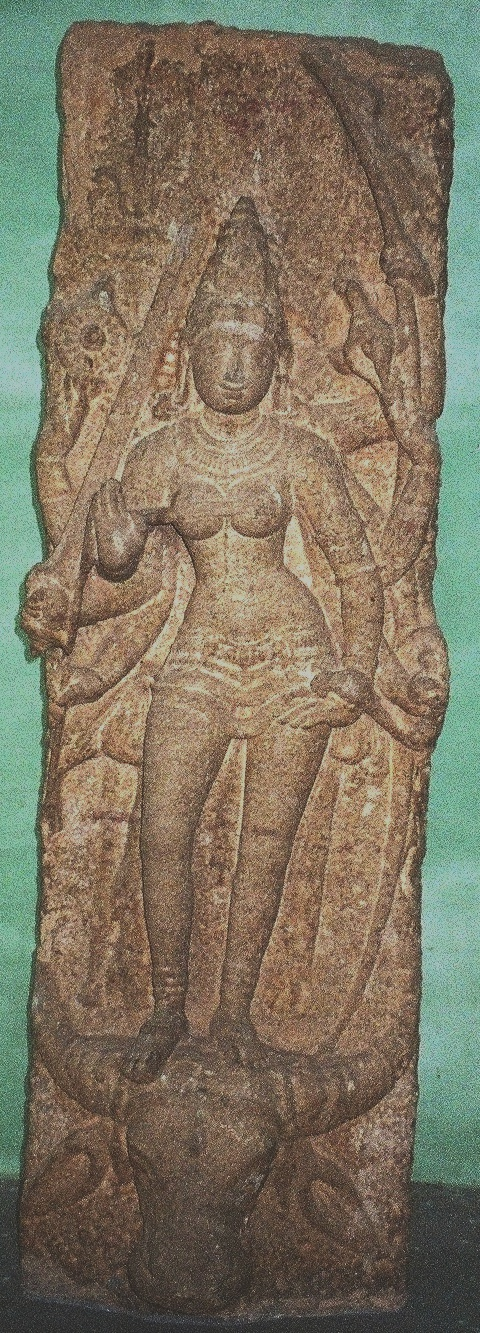
In Dravidian tradition, ululation as a war cry or a call to victory is dedicated to Korravai, The Goddess of War and Victory.

Ululation is also widely practiced in the eastern parts of India, where it is also known as Ululudhvani. People, especially women roll their tongues and produce this sound during all Hindu temple rituals, festivals and celebrations. This is also an integral part of most weddings in these parts, where, depending upon the local usages, women ululate to welcome the groom or bride or both. Bengalis call it ulu-dhwani, and they use it during weddings and other festivals. Odias call it Hulahuli or Huluhuli. In Odisha, ululation is used to cheer during weddings, cultural gatherings and celebrations. The Assamese people call it uruli. In Tamil, it is known as kulavai (Tamil:குளவை). In Kerala, ululation is essential for all ceremonial occasions, and the term used in Malayalam is kurava (Malayalam:കൊരവ). For the native people of Kashmir, it is commonly practised and called Zagruta. It is mostly practised during weddings, a wedding lead-up, or other occasions such as birthdays or upon hearing good news.

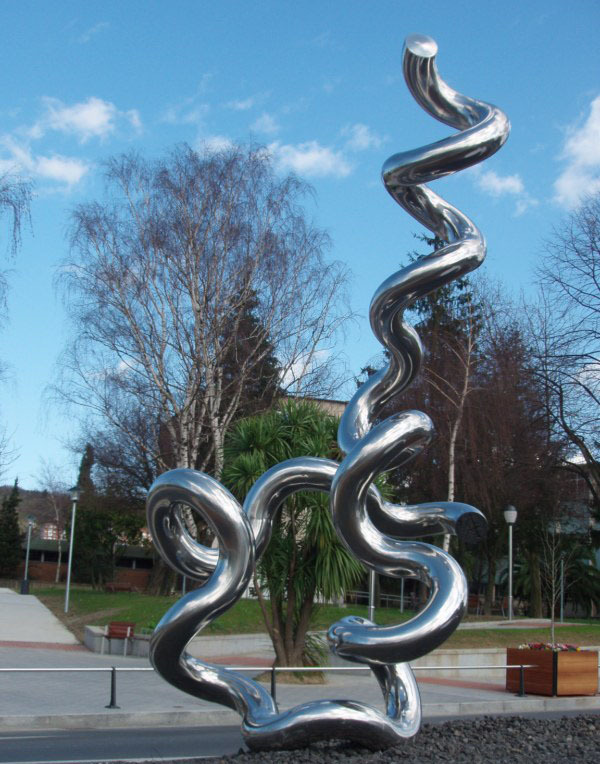
Sculpture Irrintzi in the air by Mikel Varas.

Ululation is rooted in the culture of North Africa, Northern parts of West Africa and Eastern Africa, as well as Southern Africa, and is widely practiced in Morocco, Algeria, Tunisia, Libya, Egypt, Mauritania, Tanzania, Kenya, Angola, Democratic Republic of the Congo, Botswana, Lesotho, Malawi, Mozambique, Namibia, South Africa, Eswatini, Ethiopia-Eritrea, Somalia, Uganda, Zambia, and Zimbabwe. It is used by women to give praises at weddings and all other celebrations. It is a general sound of good cheer and celebration, when good news has been delivered in a place of gathering, even in church. It is also an integral part of most African weddings where women gather around the bride and groom, dancing and ululating exuberantly. During graduation ceremonies, ululation shows pride and joy in scholastic achievement. The women ululating usually stand and make their way to the front to dance and ululate around the graduate.

=== Europe ===
Ululations are used to some extent by south European women. The Basque irrintzi is a signal of happiness originating from shepherds. It has been proposed as a technique for vocal rehabilitation. The Galician aturuxo is performed with accompanied vocalization from the throat.

=== Americas ===
It is also practiced by some Native American tribes. In the Lakota tribe, women yell "lililili" in a high-pitched voice to praise warriors for acts of valor. The Apaches also practice ululation, as do the Cherokee, as war cries.

== In ancient times ==
In Ancient Egypt, references to ululation appear in the inscriptions of the Pyramid Texts of Unas, on the West Wall of the Corridor (section XIII), and of Pepi I, in the Spells for Entering the Akhet. In ancient Greece, ululation or (Greek: ὀλολυγή, romanized: ololuge) was normally used as a joyful expression to celebrate good news or when an animal's throat is cut during sacrifice. However, in Aeschylus' Agamemnon, along with being an expression of joy, it is also used for fury, and in Sophocles' Electra, it is employed as an expression of grief. As in many cultures, use depended on context: ululated exclamations could appear in different circumstances as a cry of lament or as a battle-cry.

Homer mentions ololuge (ululation) in his works, as does Herodotus, citing ululation in North Africa – where it is still practiced – saying:

I think for my part that the loud cries uttered in our sacred rites came also from thence; for the Libyan women are greatly given to such cries and utter them very sweetly.

Or in another translation:

I also think that the ololuge or cry of praise emitted during the worship of Athena started in Libya, because it is often employed by Libyan women, who do it extremely well.

The Hebrew word Hallelujah, translated as a call to "praise the Lord", contains the root H-L-L, with meanings related to "praise". This root may have originally been an onomatopoeic imitation of ululation performed in Israelite rituals.

== In popular culture ==
In the 1990s television series Xena: Warrior Princess, Xena's iconic battle cry is a personalized version of an Arabic ululation. Actress Lucy Lawless created the sound, adapting it from watching women at a funeral because creator Rob Tapert wanted a "signature call" for the heroine.

At the 2020 Super Bowl LIV halftime show, Colombian singer Shakira, whose father is Lebanese, ululated at the camera during her performance.

== See also ==
- Keening
- Onomatopoeia
- Tarzan yell
- Trill
- Yodeling
