= Amar Nag =

Burmese communist leader (1917–1968)

Amar Nag alias Yebaw Tun Maung or U Hla (1917–1968), was one of the founding leaders of the communist movement in Burma. He was active in the struggle for Burmese independence, and an important leader of the Communist Party of Burma. He was killed in an ambush in 1968.

== Revolutionary activities ==
Amar Nag was of Bengali origin. He became interested in communism after meeting with Harinarayan Ghosal, the great personality of the communist movement. He was involved in the Bengali revolutionary groups active in Burma. On August 15, 1939, he took part in the founding meeting of the Communist Party of Burma (CPB).

During the Second World War, he went to India to study, and obtained a M.B.B.S. degree there. During his stay in India, he was active in the Communist Party of India and led the field work of the Bengal Medical Relief Camp and Coordination Committee. He worked closely with Bijoy Kumar Bose (from the Congress Medical Mission to China), organizing relief efforts for the people of Bengal suffering from plague and famine with instruction of Dr. Bidhan Chandra Roy. He was also active in organizing the Calcutta Tramways Workers' Union in Park Circus section.

In 1947, Amar Nag returned to Burma and began to practice at the Rangoon General Hospital. However, politics would soon put an end to his career. He went underground in March 1948. He set forth to travel to Pyinmana, where the party headquarters was located, reaching the site in May 1948.

Amar Nag served as a member of the Central Committee of the party. As a medical practitioner in the communist movement, he trained the first batch of medical brigades of the party. He was a key figure in the party in the 1950s. He was a Political Commissar for the party in the North-West Military Region, operating in Sagaing and Magwe. He served as the principal of the Central Medical School of the Communist Party of Burma.

== Death ==
On November 9, 1968 the 77th Division of the Burma Army attacked the CPB Medical School in the Pegu Yoma mountain range. Several students of the school were killed in the attack. Amar Nag and a small group of followers managed to escape, but was killed by Army forces on November 11, 1968.
