= Bengali Sunni Jameh Mosque =

Coordinates: 16°46′30″N 96°09′30″E

The Bengali Sunni Jameh Mosque (Burmese: ဘင်္ဂါလီဆွန်နီဂျိမ်းဗလီ) is a Sunni Islamic mosque located in Yangon, Myanmar. It is situated in the vicinity of the Sule Pagoda and the Yangon City Hall.

== History ==
The mosque was built during the British rule over Burma (1824–1948). A plot of land opposite both the Sule Pagoda and the Yangon City Hall was selected for the construction of the mosque. Construction on the mosque was completed by 1862. It was also built as a jameh (congregational mosque) by Bengali Muslims living in the city of Yangon, hence its name.

== Architecture ==
The mosque exhibits Indo-Islamic and Indo-Saracenic architectureal styles in its exterior. Two cylindrical minarets flank the building on either side, while the main building has three floors. The first floor and ground level contains the main ablutions facility, the main prayer hall, and ancillary rooms, while the second floor is used as a kindergarten for children and the uppermost floor is used for the Friday prayers.
