= Ululudhvani =

Tradition in some Indian states where women ululate during celebrations

Ululudhvani

Ululudhwani (also known as Jokara, Uruli, Hula Huli or Hulu Huli) is a tradition in Assam, Bengal, Odisha, Kerala and Tamil Nadu, where during weddings and other festivals, women ululate. It symbolizes festivity and prosperity. It is performed heavily in the Durga Puja and Kali Puja festivities in Bengal.

== Names in different cultures ==
1) Assam - উৰুলি (Uruli)

2) West Bengal & Bangladesh - উলুধ্বনি (Uludhoni)

3) Odisha - ହୁଳହୁଳି/ହୁଳୁହୁଳି/ମୁହଁଘଣ୍ଟ (Huḷåhuḷi/Hulu huli/Muhãghåṇṭå)

4) Maharashtra - बोंबलणे (Bombalaṇe)

5) Karnataka - ಹುರುಪು (Hurupu)

6) Kerala - കുരുബ (Kuruva)

7) Tamil Nadu - குலவை (Kulavai)

== See also ==
- Ululation
