= Calcutta Tramways Workers' and Employees' Union =

Trade union in India

Calcutta Tramways Workers' and Employees' Union is a trade union of workers at the Kolkata tramway. CTW&EU is affiliated to the Centre of Indian Trade Unions. CTW&EU was founded in 1975.

== History ==
The first union involving tram workers in Kolkata was the Calcutta Tramways Employees' Union (CTEU), which was founded in 1920 following a spontaneous strike on 1 October of that year.

In 1927, the union was reorganised into the Calcutta Tramways Workers' Union.
