= Shri Kali Temple, Burma =

Shri Kali Temple
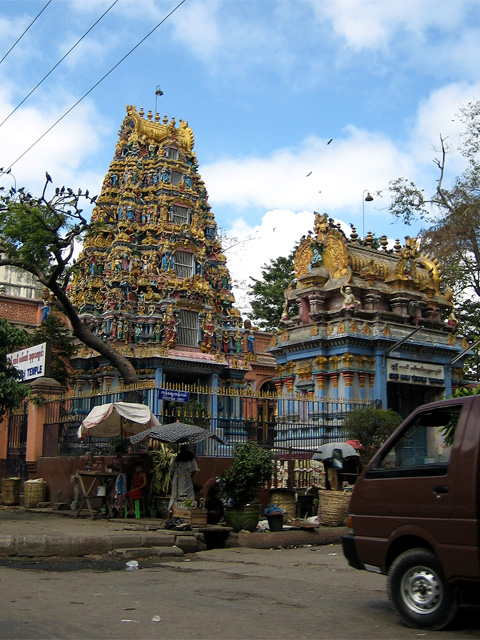
- The exterior of Shri Kali Temple

- Location within Myanmar

Religion
- Affiliation: Hinduism

Location
- Location: Yangon
- State: Yangon Region
- Country: Burma
- Interactive map of Shri Kali Temple
- Coordinates: 16°46′38.08″N 96°9′16.08″E

Architecture
- Completed: 1871; 155 years ago

Shri Kali Temple is a Hindu temple located in the undefined Little India in downtown Yangon, Burma. It was built by Tamil migrants in 1871, whilst Burma Province was part of British India. The temple is noted for its colorful architecture, especially its roof, which contains images and stone carvings of many Hindu gods. The temple is maintained by the local Indian community.

== See also ==
- Nathlaung Kyaung Temple
- Nanpaya Temple
