= Kha Maung Seik massacre =

Massacre in Rakhine State, Myanmar in 2017

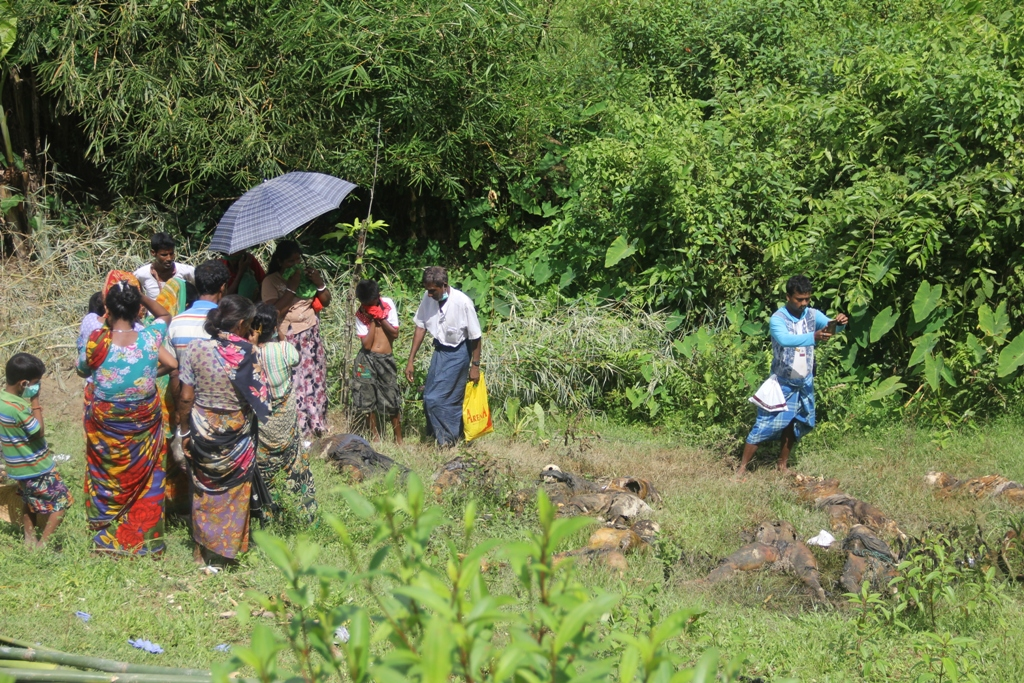
- Hindu villagers gather at a mass grave to identify the corpses of family members who were killed in the massacre.

- Location of Kha Maung Seik Kha Maung Seik (Asia)
- Location: Kha Maung Seik, Maungdaw District, Rakhine State, Myanmar
- Date: 25 August 2017 (UTC+6:30)
- Target: Bengali Hindus
- Attack type: Massacre
- Weapons: Guns, machetes, knives
- Deaths: 99
- Perpetrator: Arakan Rohingya Salvation Army

On 25 August 2017, Muslim insurgents from the Arakan Rohingya Salvation Army (ARSA) attacked Hindu villages in a cluster known as Kha Maung Seik in the northern Maungdaw District of Rakhine State in Myanmar and massacred 99 Bengali Hindu villagers. A month later, the Myanmar Army discovered mass graves containing the corpses of 45 Hindus, most of whom were women and children.

The Myanmar authorities and international investigators blamed ARSA for the deaths. ARSA has denied responsibility and rejected allegations made in an Amnesty International report.

== Background ==
Bengali Hindus constitute a minority group in Maungdaw District. With a population of around 5,000, they constitute about 1% of the population.

== Killings ==
According to eyewitness accounts, on 25 August, unidentified men in black masks attacked the Hindu villages in Kha Maung Seik also known as Fwaira Bazar or Fakira Bazar. The men spoke several languages the villagers could not identify, but they also spoke the dialect spoken by the Rohingyas and the Hindus. They objected to the official identity cards that were provided by the Myanmar authorities to the Hindus, stating that the Hindus should not have them.

The masked men took around 100 people hostage and forced them to march through the fields. They were led into a forest on a hill, where the insurgents separated eight women from the group of hostages, allegedly to set them aside for marriage to the insurgents later. The insurgents then blindfolded the remaining captives, tied their hands behind their backs and tied their legs. The hostages then had their throats slit with knives by the insurgents. Three pits were dug by the insurgents, and the corpses were dumped inside.

Nine Hindu villages were burnt, resulting in more than 500 Hindu refugees fleeing across the border into Bangladesh. The Hindu villages of Kyeinchaung and Ngakhuya survived the arson attacks, and the villagers have returned.

== Forced conversion ==
Ni Maul, a Hindu leader who helped Myanmar's authorities with the search of the bodies, told the media that the mass graves were found from testimony of eight Hindu women whose lives were spared and brought to Bangladesh after they agreed to convert to Islam.

Four Hindu women in Bangladesh told Agence-France Presse that they were among the eight who escaped. They stated that they were forced to marry the attackers in order to save their lives and they were later taken to camps of Rohingya Muslims in Bangladesh.

The Hindu women stated that the militants found them beautiful and decided to convert them. They added that later the eight women along with children were taken to a house in Bawtalar village where they were forced to eat rice with meat, which is against some Hindu beliefs. They were then brought to Kutuparlaung refugee camp on 28 August where they were housed with Muslims and forced to wear burqas.

== Exodus ==
Thousands of Hindus fled villages where they lived alongside Muslims and alleged they had been targeted by ARSA. Since the outbreak of the violence in Rakhine in August, 3,000 Hindus from Maungdaw and Buthidaung townships were internally displaced while 500 fled to Bangladesh. Rana Dasgupta, secretary of Hindu Buddhist Christian Unity Council, stated that Hindu refugees had described murder of 86 Hindus. Hindus who fled the area told Agence-France Presse that masked men stormed their community and later buried the victims after hacking them to death. A Hindu woman stated that masked men dressed in black attacked her village near Kha Maung Seik and she fled to Bangladesh.

== Local investigations ==
While authorities were preoccupied with ARSA's insurgent operations at the time, Kyaw Zaw Oo, a Rakhine State Hluttaw MP, investigated the massacre and posted a detailed account on his Facebook page on 13 September 2017. He was one of the first to alert domestic and international communities about the massacre.

== Relief and rehabilitation ==
=== Bangladesh ===
When the local Bengali Hindus of Ukhia Upazila in Cox's Bazar District, came to know about Hindu refugees camping in the forest, they brought the Hindu refugees and provided shelter to them near a Hindu temple. A poultry farm was converted to a makeshift refugee camp, where around 300 Hindus were sheltered. The remaining 200 Hindus were provided shelter by the local Hindu families. The local Bengali Hindus provided donations for the daily meals to the Hindu refugees.

=== Myanmar ===
Following the massacre hundreds of Hindu families along with the Rakhines fled the rural areas to take shelter in Sittwe. More than 500 Hindus took shelter in four Hindu temples in Sittwe and were partially supported by the Myanmar government relief team. Many Hindus also took refuge in Buddhist monasteries in Ponnagyun and Kyauktaw townships.

=== Rehabilitation ===
The Hindu refugees were scared of going back to their native places in the Rakhine State of Myanmar and at the same time fearful of staying in refugee camp in Muslim-majority Bangladesh. Instead, they hoped for rehabilitation in Hindu-majority India. The Vishwa Hindu Parishad leadership expressed that India was the natural homeland for the Hindu refugees from Myanmar. The Vishwa Hindu Parishad along with the Rashtriya Swayamsevak Sangh intended to submit a report to the Indian Home Ministry demanding a new policy that would allow Hindus of Bangladesh and Myanmar to seek asylum in India.

On the occasion of Durga Puja, 27 Hindu refugees from the Kutupalong refugee camp left the camp to observe Vijayadashami, and reportedly returned to Myanmar.

== Investigation ==
One of the eight abducted Hindu women taken into Bangladesh called up a Hindu community leader in Myanmar and told him about the massacre and the location of the mass graves. Accordingly, the local Hindu leadership prepared a list, where 102 Hindus were identified as missing from the two villages of Ye Baw Kya and Taung Ywar in the Kha Maung Seik area of Maungdaw District. A Rakhine State Hluttaw MP investigated it and posted a detailed account about it on Facebook on 13 September 2017, consequently, being the first in alerting the domestic and international communities about the incident. Based on the information, the Myanmar army discovered two mud pits with 28 Hindu corpses outside the village of Ye Baw Kya on 24 September. The victims included 20 women and eight men and children. On 25 September, the search party consisting of the Myanmar army, the police and local Hindu leader discovered 17 Hindu corpses in another two mud pits 400 metres to the north east of the previously discovered mass graves. According to the Hindu leader, the corpses were of men aged between 30 and 50. The local Hindu leadership continued their search for the remaining corpses of the missing Hindus, who are feared dead. The location of the 46 missing villagers of Ye Bauk Kyar is still unknown (as of June 2018).

The Hindu villagers believed that they were killed because the Rohingya insurgents suspected them of being government spies.

On 27 September, the Myanmar army lifted the restriction on travelling to the conflict zone and allowed foreign journalists to fly there.

Six Rohingya insurgents suspected to have been involved in the killings were found among the Rohingya Muslim refugees in Bangladesh. The Bangladesh authorities denied having arrested them on charges of massacre. The Myanmar authorities resolved to bring back the eight Hindu women who were forced to convert to Islam and were taken to Bangladesh by the Rohingya refugees, to stand as witness in the trial.

On 22 May 2018, Amnesty International released a report apportioning the blame for the massacre in the village of Ah Nauk Maung Seik on the ARSA and said they were responsible for the deaths in nearby village Kha Maung Seik. The report was based on 'dozens of interviews conducted [in Rakhine State] and across the border in Bangladesh, as well as photographic evidence analysed by forensic pathologists'.

ARSA rejected Amnesty's report on 25 May 2018, calling it "unjustifiable and careless serious criminal accusations". It called for a credible international investigation.

== Reactions ==
The Myanmar authorities accused the Rohingya militants of perpetrating the Hindu massacre in the Kha Maung Seik area.

ARSA denied the involvement of the group in the Hindu massacre; instead, they accused the Buddhist nationalists of creating a divide between the Hindus and Muslims. In a Twitter post, they denied any role in the massacre. An alleged Rohingya insurgent, along with his supporters at the Kutupalong refugee camp in Bangladesh, accused the Rakhine Buddhists of the Hindu massacre and putting the blame on Rohingya Muslims.

Tirana Hassan, Crisis Response Director at Amnesty International, said, ″It's hard to ignore the sheer brutality of ARSA's actions, which have left an indelible impression on the survivors we've spoken to. Accountability for these atrocities is every bit as crucial as it is for the crimes against humanity carried out by Myanmar's security forces in northern Rakhine State ... In this brutal and senseless act, members of ARSA captured scores of Hindu women, men, and children and terrorised them before slaughtering them outside their own villages. The perpetrators of this heinous crime must be held to account″.

== See also ==
- Persecution of Hindus
- Terrorism in Myanmar
- Northern Rakhine State clashes
- List of massacres in Myanmar
