= Nanpaya Temple =

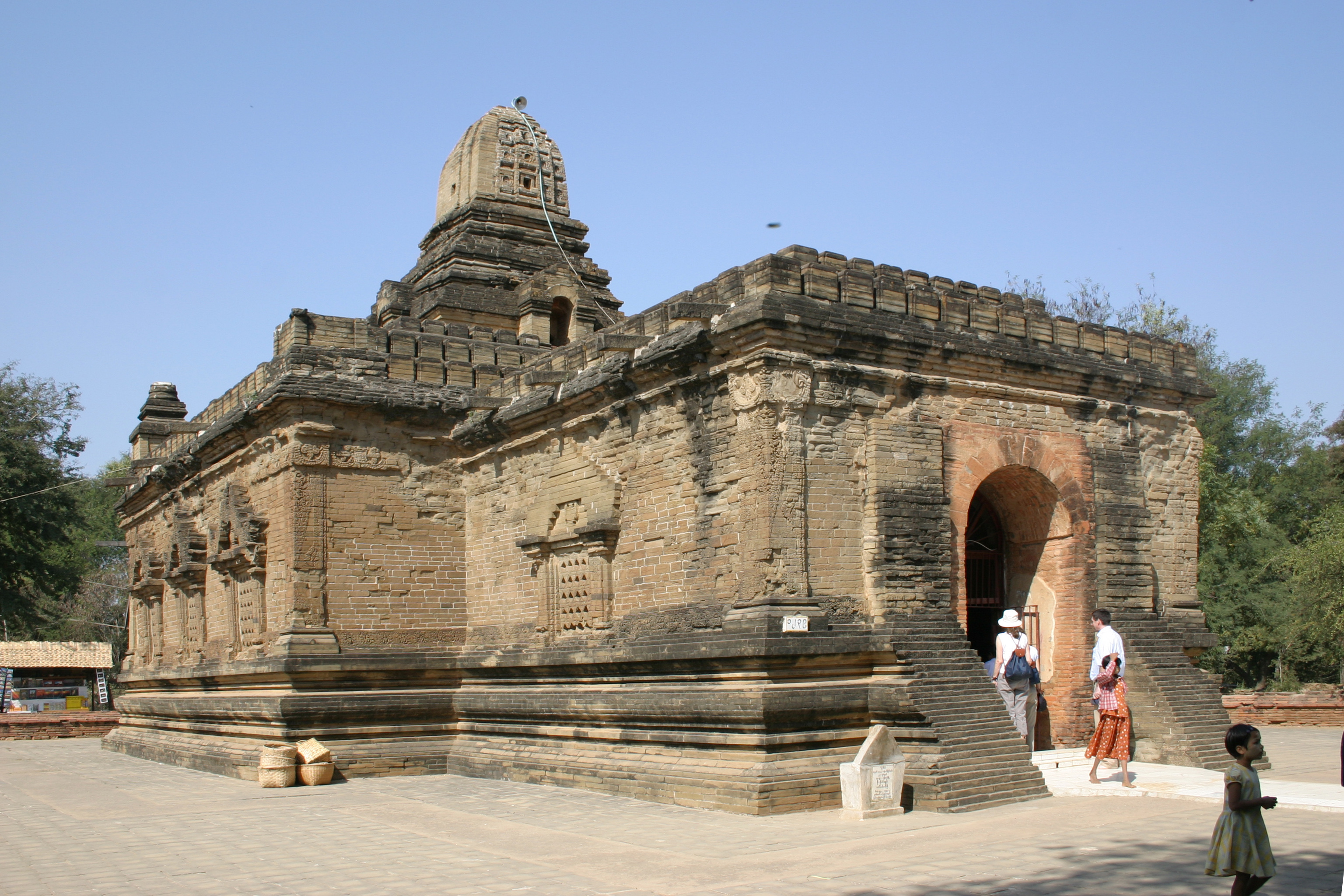

- Location within Myanmar

Religion
- Affiliation: Hinduism
- Deity: Brahma

Location
- Location: Myinkaba (a village south of Bagan)
- Country: Burma
- Interactive map of Nanpaya Temple
- Coordinates: 21.152547°N 94.858777°E

Architecture
- Creator: Manuha

Nanpaya Temple (Burmese: နန်းဘုရားကျောင်း [náɰ̃ pʰəjá tɕáʊɰ̃]; lit. "palace temple") is a historic Hindu temple located in Myinkaba, a village just south of Bagan, in the Mandalay Region of Myanmar. The temple is situated adjacent to the Manuha Temple and is believed to have been built by King Makuta (also known as Manuha), the captive monarch of the defeated Thaton Kingdom.

== History and Cultural Significance ==
The Nanpaya Temple is closely tied to the legacy of the Mon people and King Manuha. According to tradition, it was constructed as his personal residence during captivity, later becoming a temple. The temple features iconography from the Brahmanical Hindu tradition, particularly the Vishnu and Brahma sects of India. Because King Manuha was of Mon descent, many carvings and decorative features within the temple also represent Mon cultural symbols, such as the Hintha (or hamsa) bird, a sacred emblem of the Mon people.

The temple's interior includes intricate stone carvings of Brahma, often depicted seated on lotuses. These statues are accompanied by representations of other Hindu deities and floral motifs, reflecting a fusion of Indian and Southeast Asian artistic traditions.

== Architecture ==
Nanpaya Temple is built from mud mortar, brick, and stone—a rare architectural combination in Bagan. The temple’s design includes:

- A square inner sanctum and a front hall (mandapa)
- Four massive square stone pillars supporting the ceiling
- Stone-carved Pantamao floral reliefs and decorative borders
- Ornate lattice windows made of brick and stone

The four central stone pillars are especially noteworthy. Each features:

- Elaborate carvings of three-headed Brahma figures
- Brahma seated in lotus position (padmasana), holding lotus petals
- Giant angular flower patterns

These pillars were carved from individual stones and assembled using a strong adhesive to create deep reliefs. The walls and pillars are additionally adorned with carvings of lotus pots (kalatha), stylized vines, and Mon motifs.

== Related Structure: Nang Pagoda ==
Nearby is a structure known as the Nang Pagoda, located in the Kuntaungpauk Pass. It was reportedly built in the 12th century by Nagathaman, a son-in-law of both King Narapati Sithu and King Manuha. The pagoda commemorates the location where King Manuha is believed to have resided.

The Nang Pagoda features:

- A cave-temple format with thick stone slab construction
- Carved lotus pots, hintha motifs, and makara guardians
- Decorative betel leaf sculptures and stone-relief frames
- Flower-patterned kalasa pots in window carvings
- A unique architectural style that is not seen elsewhere in the Bagan region

== Art and Symbolism ==
Inside the temple, visitors can observe:

- A central hall with a former Buddha or deity statue (now missing)
- Arched windows framed by carvings of kalasa, makara, and lotus vines
- Partially preserved statues of Vishnu on Garuda, and images illustrating Vishnu's cosmic functions

One fragmentary sculpture represents Vishnu’s cosmic role in creation. It originally showed Vishnu reclining on the serpent Shesha (Kala Naga), floating on the ocean. From his navel, a lotus was said to rise, birthing the god Brahma. While only the serpent's tail remains today, the image was an important representation of Vishnu’s cosmic role as preserver and creator.

== Preservation ==
The Nanpaya Temple is one of the oldest Hindu structures in the Bagan archaeological zone. Although partially damaged by time and earthquakes, it remains notable for its religious, artistic, and historical value, especially as a rare surviving monument of Brahmanical Hinduism in a predominantly Buddhist landscape.
