= H. N. Goshal =

Burmese communist leader (1915–1967)

H.N. Goshal Thakin Ba Tin

Personal details
- Born: 1915
- Died: 18 June 1967 (aged 51–52)
- Occupation: Politician, Theoretician
- Known for: One of the Founders of the Communist Party of Burma

Hamendrnath Goshal (Bengali: হেমেন্দ্রনাথ ঘোষাল; 1915–1967), also known as Harinarayan Ghoshal or Thakin Ba Tin (Burmese: သခင်ဘတင်, IPA: [θəkʰɪ̀ɰ̃ ba̰ tɪ̀ɰ̃]), was a communist politician and trade union leader in Burma, of Bengali Hindu origin. Goshal was one of the foremost leaders of the Communist Party of Burma and the most prominent theoretician of the party for several years. During the height of the Cultural Revolution (which had repercussions in the Communist Party of Burma) Goshal was marginalized and killed in an inner-party purge.

== Political activities ==
Goshal graduated from Rangoon University. In August 1939, Goshal took part in the founding of the Communist Party of Burma. He was a member of the Bengali cell of the party. He was associated with Subodh Mukherjee, Dr. Amar Nag, Amar De, Gopal Munshi, Madhav Munshi, etc. During the Japanese occupation, Goshal fled to India. During the early days of the Communist Party of Burma, Goshal played an important role as a liaison between the Burmese party and the Communist Party of India (through its Bengal Provincial Committee).

After the death of Thakin Ba Hein, Goshal became the head of the All Burma Trade Union Congress. His activities were mainly concentrated to Rangoon, organizing the largely Indian working class there.

Goshal is said to have visited India just before the Communist Party of India held its second congress of 1948 (some controversy exists regarding this subject; if he was in India and if so, which meetings he attended). In India, and other countries in Asia, the communist parties reoriented themselves towards a more confrontational line. Goshal edited a political and strategic document, calling for the Communist Party of Burma to prepare for armed struggle. The document would be nicknamed the 'Goshal Thesis'. The Goshal Thesis stood in sharp contrast to the 'Browderist' positions the Communist Party of Burma had until then. The Goshal Thesis was adopted by the Communist Party of Burma at a mass meeting in Pyinmana on March 14, 1948. At this point, Goshal emerged as the main theorist of the party.

In response to the Goshal Thesis, the Burmese government ordered a crack-down on the Communist Party. The party responded by calling on its leaders to head for the country-side and led guerrilla warfare from there. At this point, Goshal argued in favour of retaining the presence of the party in the cities and to mobilize for general strikes and popular protests in Rangoon. Seemingly contradictory to the Goshal Thesis, Goshal was the sole Central Committee member of the party that did not support the Maoist line of rural warfare.

== Death ==
During the 1960s Goshal was denounced in an inner-party purge, labelled 'the Liu Shaoqi of Burma' and executed in the Pegu Yoma on 18 June 1967. He had been on the losing side in a factional conflict following the return of a section of the party leadership that had been exiled in Beijing. He lost an important vote at the Communist Party politburo meeting of June 1965, where he had argued against Thakin Than Tun's proposal to organize a new party school (Thakin Than Tun had returned from Beijing, whilst Goshal had been a leader of the party inside Burma. Thakin Than Tun had proposed setting up a new party school, with teachers trained in China).
