= Makara =

Hindu mythological creature

- Mythological Sea Creature
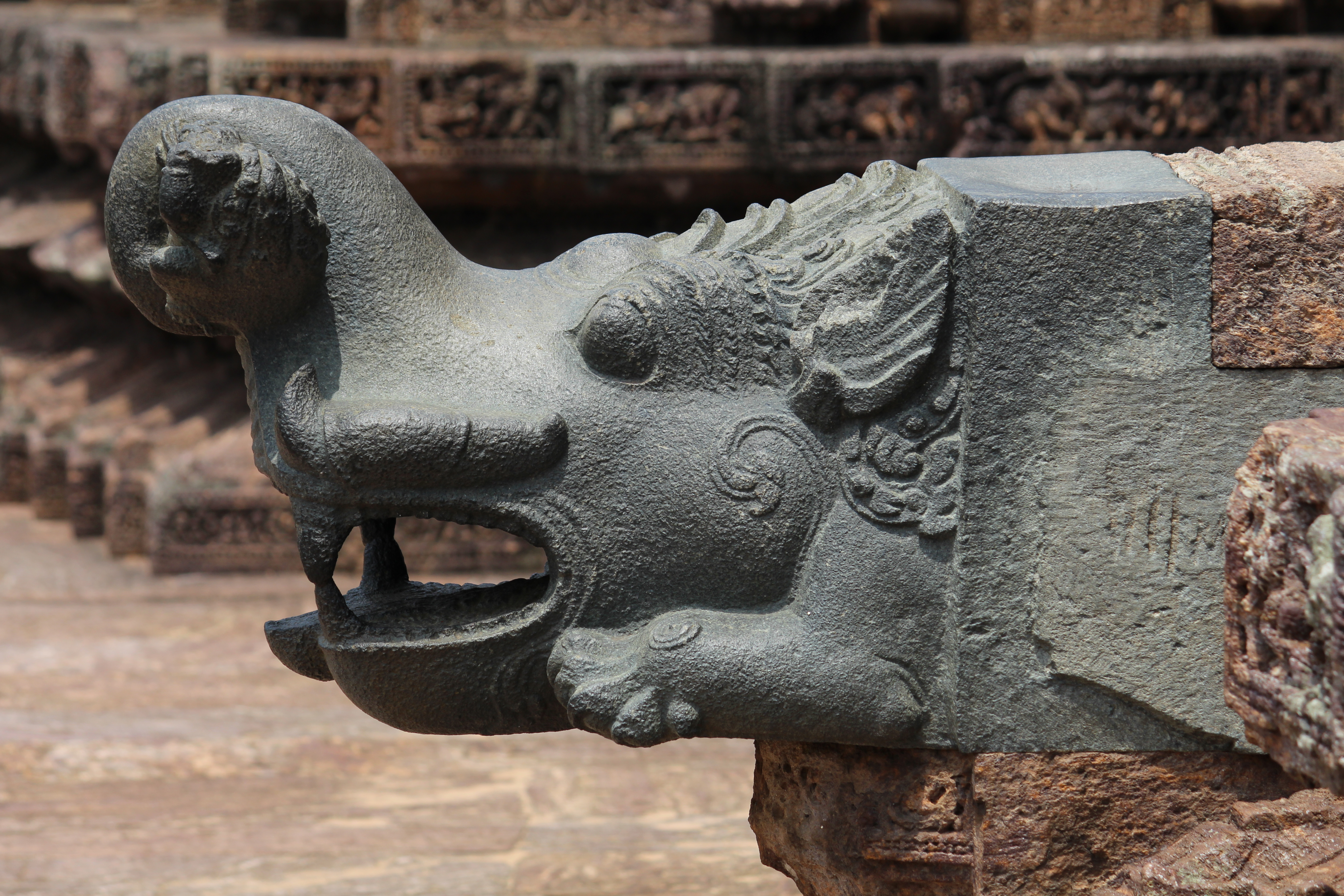
- Makara at the Konarak temple
- Devanagari: मकर
- Sanskrit transliteration: Makara
- Affiliation: Mount of Ganga, Varuna

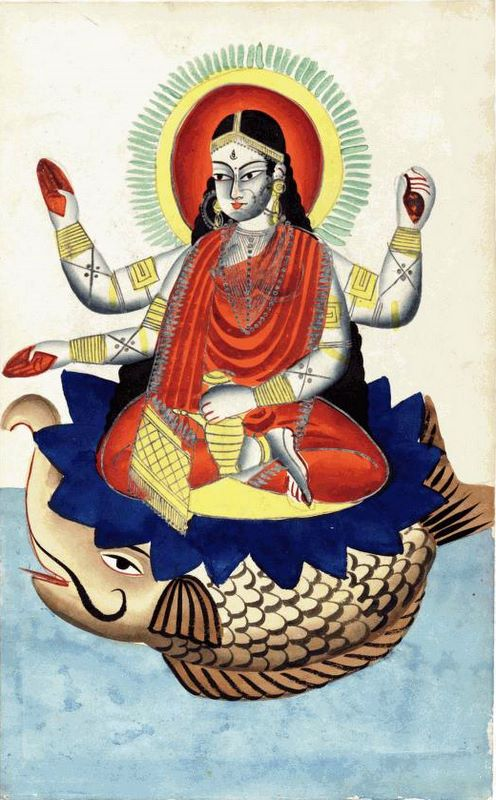
Makara as the Vahana (vehicle) of the goddess Ganga

Makara (Sanskrit: मकर, romanized: Makara) is a legendary sea-creature in Hindu mythology. In Hindu astrology, Makara is equivalent to the Zodiac sign Capricorn.

Makara appears as the vahana (vehicle) of the river goddess Ganga, Narmada, and of the god of the ocean, Varuna. Makara are considered guardians of gateways and thresholds, protecting throne rooms as well as entryways to temples; it is the most commonly recurring creature in Hindu and Buddhist temple iconography, and also frequently appears as a gargoyle or as a spout attached to a natural spring. Makara-shaped earrings called Makarakundalas are sometimes worn by Hindu deities, for example Shiva, Vishnu, Surya, and Chandi. Makara is also the insignia of the love god Kamadeva, who has no dedicated temples and is also known as Makaradhvaja, "one whose flag depicts a makara".

== Etymology ==
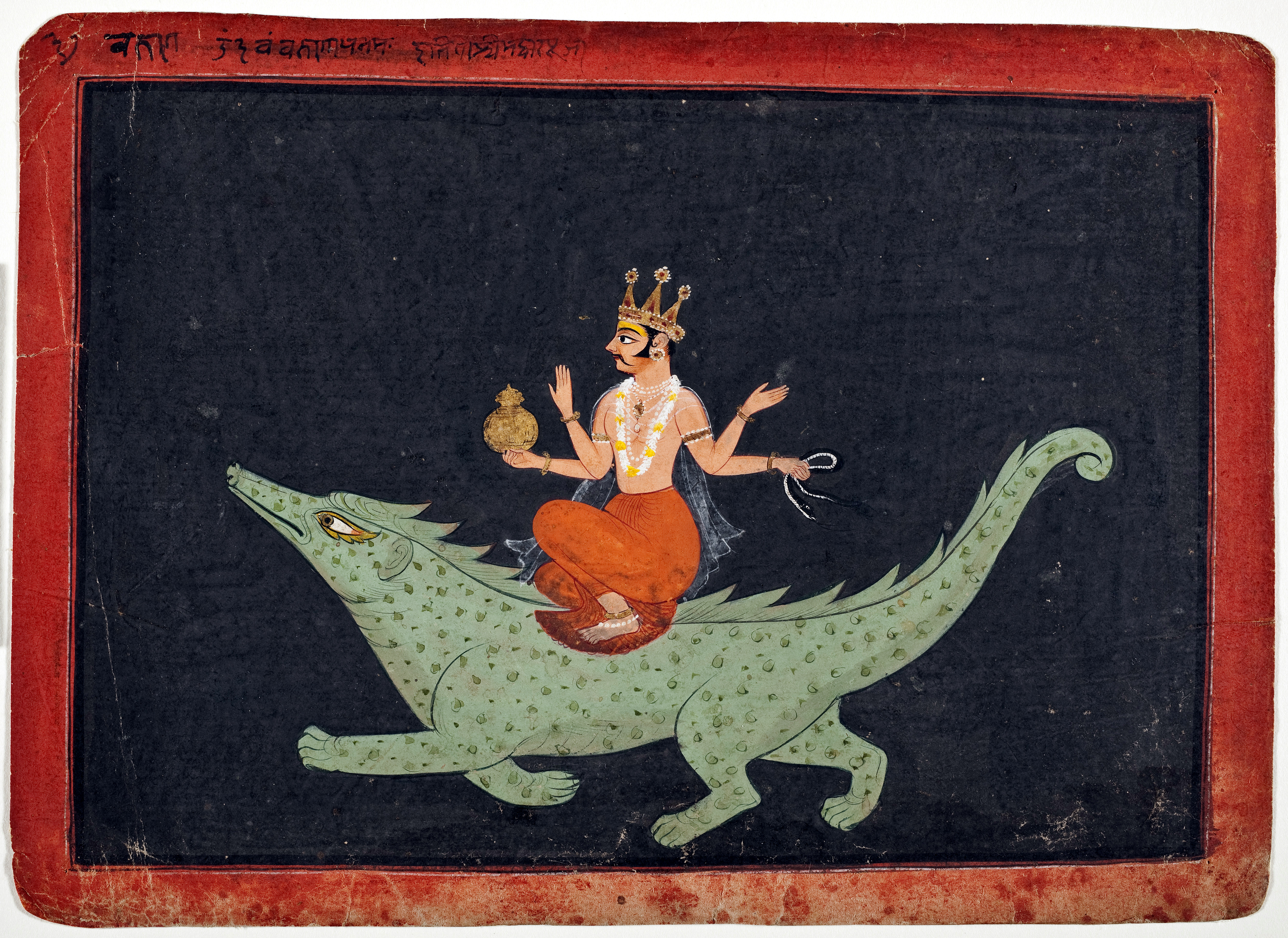
A crocodile-like Makara as Varuna's animal vehicle

Makara is a Sanskrit word which means "sea-animal, crocodile".

Several German scientists argued that makara is based on the dugong instead, based on reading of Jain text of Sūryaprajñapti. The South Asian river dolphin may also have contributed to the image of the makara.

== Physical features of makara ==
It is generally depicted as half terrestrial animal in the frontal part (stag, deer, or elephant) and half aquatic animal in the hind part (usually of a fish, a dolphin, or a snake, though sometimes a peacock or even a floral tail is depicted). Though Makara may take many different forms throughout Hindu culture, in the modern world, its form is always related to the marsh crocodile or water monitor.

According to an art historian, John Boardman, depictions of Makara and Chinese Dragon might have been influenced by Kētos in Greek Mythology, possibly after contact with silk-road images of the Kētos.

In Sinhalese ancient artwork Makara is made up of body parts of six or seven animals such as the trunk of the elephant, jaws of the crocodile, ears of the mouse or ape, extruding teeth of wild swine, the tail plume of the peacock and feet of the lion.

== Iconography ==
=== Vedic era iconography ===
During Vedic times when Indra was the god of heaven, Varuna (the Vedic water god) became the God of the seas and rode on makara, which was called "the water monster vehicle".

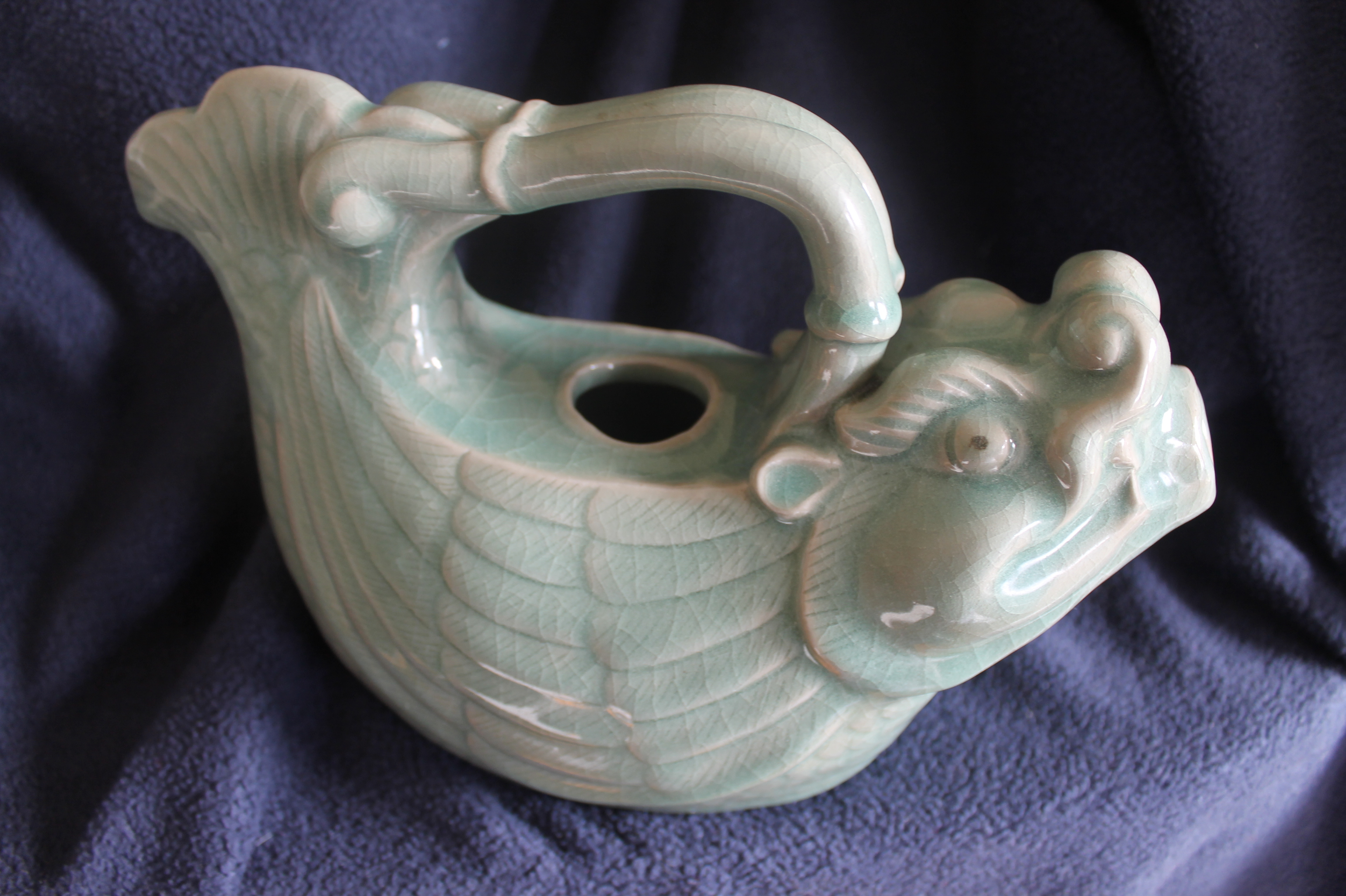
Celadon green-blue glazed pottery ewer, molded as Makara dragon-fish

Vishnu's earrings are shown in the form of Makara; but makarakundala can also decorate Shiva's ears. Its contemporary usage is as ornaments in the form of bracelets in hollow silver ware inlaid with jewels for eyes and ears, which is given as a wedding gift to the bride. Some traditional account also links the Makara to the water monitor as both has body parts (example: jaws, meat etc.) which are stated to possess aphrodisiac properties.

Makara has been depicted typically as half mammal and half fish. In many temples, the depiction is in the form of half fish or seal with head of an elephant. It is also shown in an abstract, chimeric form with head and jaws of a crocodile, an elephant trunk with scales of fish and a peacock tail. Lakshmi sitting on a lotus is also a depiction in which she pulls the tongue of the elephant shaped makara is meant to project Lakshmi's image as the goddess of prosperity, wealth and well being. It represents a necessary state of chaos before the emergence of a new state of order.

Makara is also the emblem of Kamadeva, the god of love and desire. Kamadeva is also known as 'Makara-Ketu' which means "having the makara for an emblem". It is the tenth sign of the Zodiac, called rāśi in Sanskrit, which is equivalent to the zodiacal sign of Capricorn (goat symbol).

=== Middle kingdoms iconography - Pradyuma Makaradhvaja ===
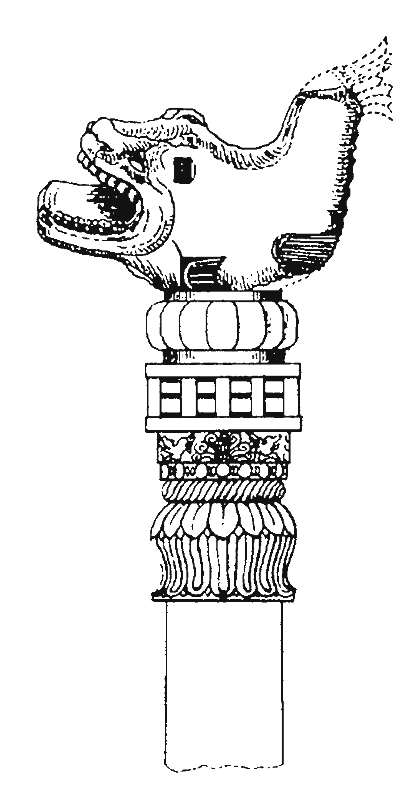
The Makara, as the one found on a pillar capital at the site of the Heliodorus pillar, is associated with Pradyumna. 2nd century BCE. Gwalior Museum.

From the 2nd century BCE, the Makara appears to have been the symbol of Pradyumna, son of Vāsudeva Krishna. One of the epithets of Pradyumna in literature, such as in Harivamsa 99, is "Makaradhvaja", meaning "he whose banner or standard is the crocodile". A pillar capital with the effigy of a Makara crocodile found at Besnagar near the Heliodorus pillar dedicated to Vasudeva, is also attributed to Pradyumna. In the Mahabharata too, the Makara is associated with Krishna's son and Kamadeva, the God of Love, suggesting they are identical.

=== Later Hindu iconography ===
==== Universal frequent occurrences ====
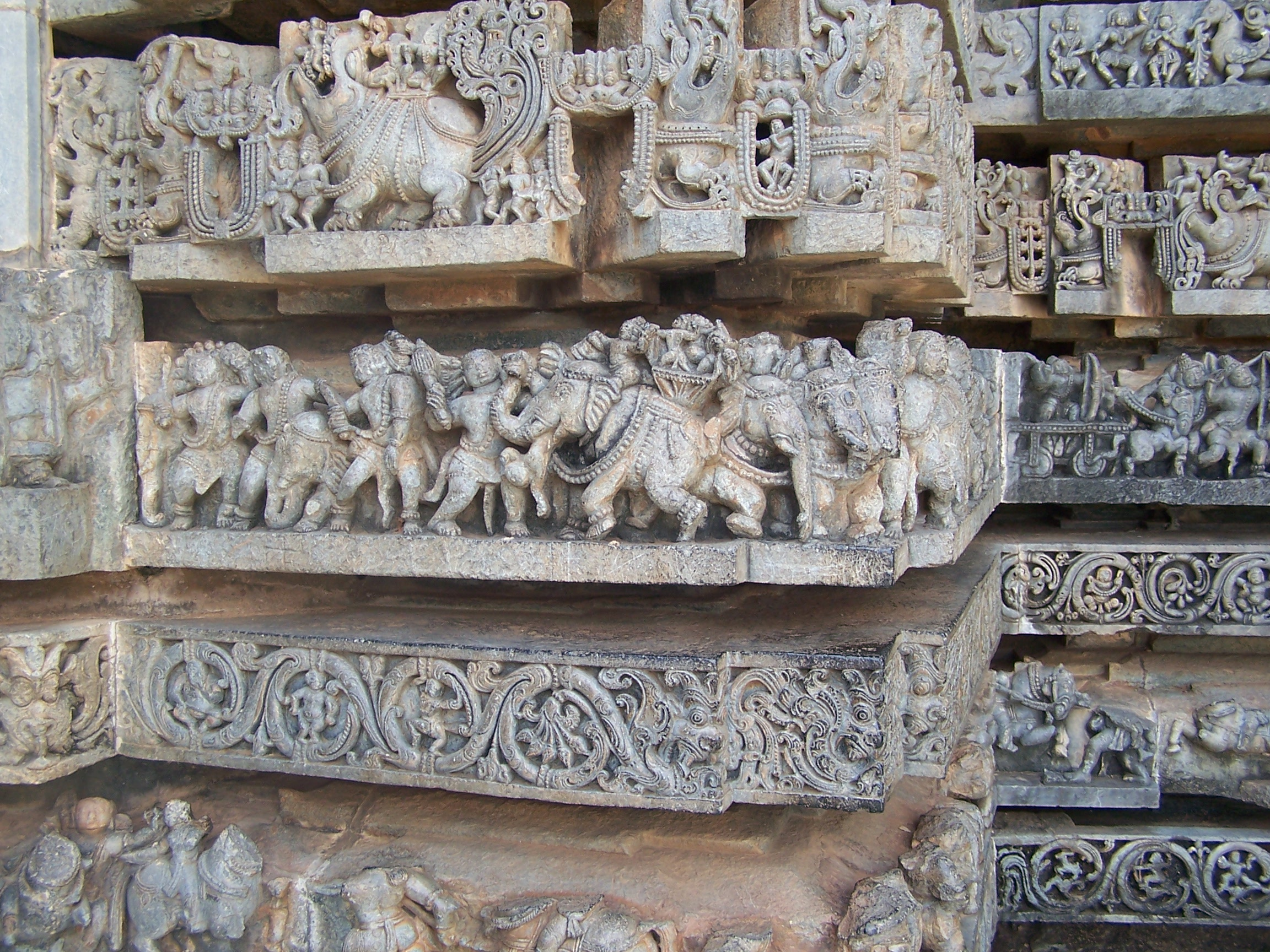
Row of Makara in base of Hoysaleswara Temple, Halebidu, Karnataka. Note Makara standing vertical at corner.

In Hindu iconography, Makara is represented as the vahana ('vehicle') of Ganga, the river goddess. A row of makara may run along the wall of a Hindu temple, act as the hand rail of a staircase, or form an arch above a doorway.

The leading Hindu temple architect and builder Ganapati Sthapati describes Makara as a mythical animal with the body of a fish, trunk of an elephant, feet of a lion, eyes of a monkey, ears of a pig, and the tail of a peacock. A more succinct explanation is provided: "An ancient mythological symbol, the hybrid creature is formed from a number of animals such that collectively possess the nature of a crocodile. It has the lower jaw of a crocodile, the snout or trunk of an elephant, the tusks and ears of a wild boar, the darting eyes of a monkey, the scales and the flexible body of a fish, and the swirling tailing feathers of a peacock."

Traditionally, a makara is considered to be an aquatic mythical creature. Makara has been depicted typically as half mammal and half fish. Some traditional accounts identify it with a crocodile, specifically the Mugger because of its etymological roots. It is depicted with the forequarters of an elephant and the hindquarters as a fish tail. Crocodile was also a form which was used in the earlier days which was shown with human body.

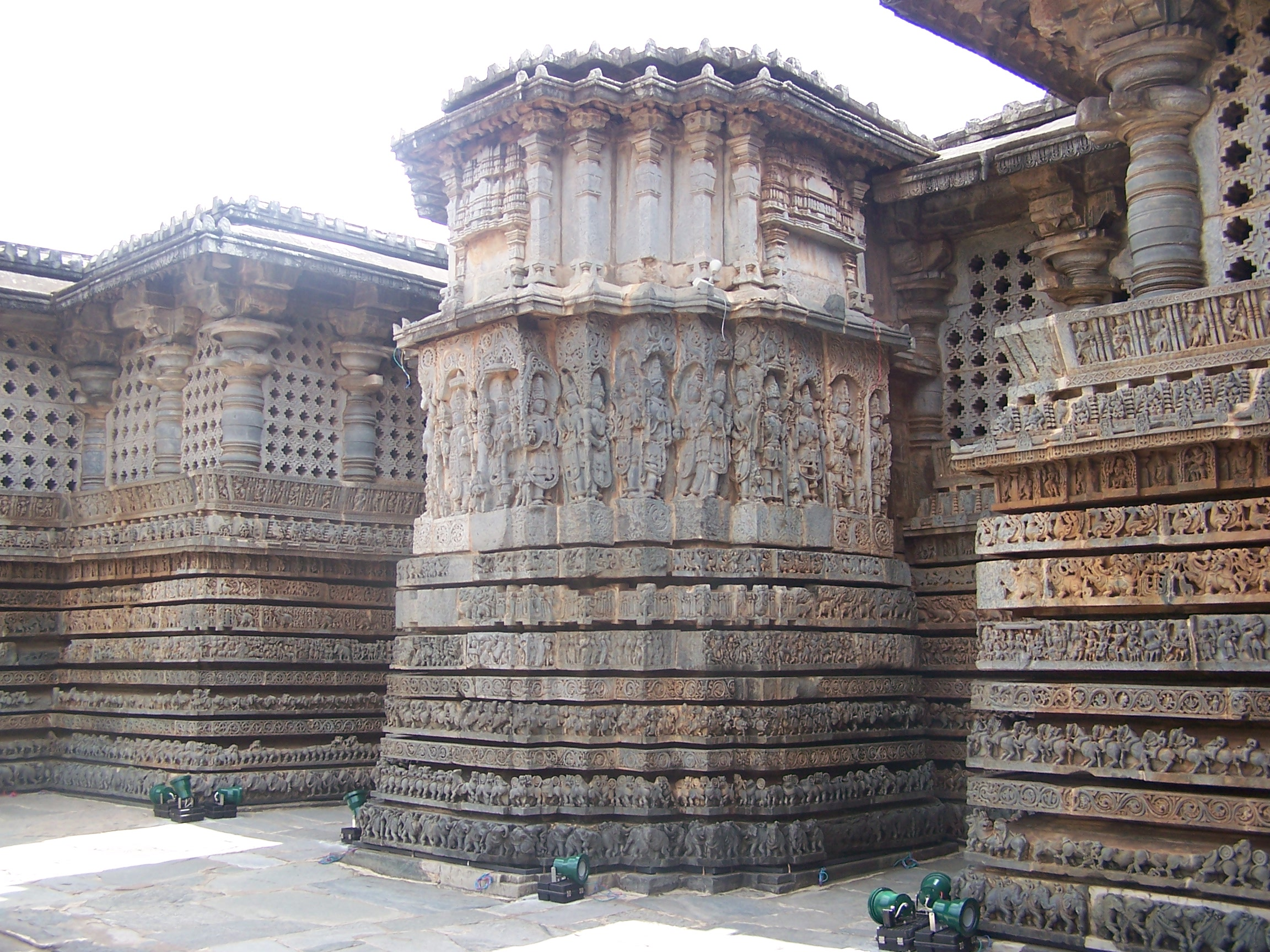
Row of Makara in base of Hoysaleswara Temple, Halebidu, Karnataka

In many temples, the depiction is in the form of half fish or seal with head of an elephant. It is also shown with head and jaws resembling a crocodile, an elephant trunk with scales of fish and a peacock tail. Other accounts identify it with Gangetic dolphin having striking resemblances with the latter, now found mainly in Vikramshila Gangetic Dolphin Sanctuary. Others portray it as a fish body with an elephant's head. The tradition identifies the makara with water, the source of all existence and fertility.

In a Hindu temple, the Makara often serves as the structural bookends of a thoranam or archway around a deity. The arch emerges up from the jaws of one Makara, rises to its peak, the Kirtimukha (the 'Face of Glory'), and descends into the gaping jaws of another Makara. Varuna is also depicted as a white man sitting on the monster makara. As a marine monster, it is also shown with the head and legs of an antelope, and the body and tail of a fish. A makara made in iron shows the monster in the form of half stag and half fish. These elements are variously joined to form one of the most common recurring themes in Indian temple iconography. In Indian art, the makara finds expression in the form of many motifs, and has been portrayed in different styles. Makara figures are placed on the entry points (Toranas) of several Buddhist monuments, including the stupa of Sanchi, a world heritage site. It is found guarding the entrances to royal thrones (see Distribution below).

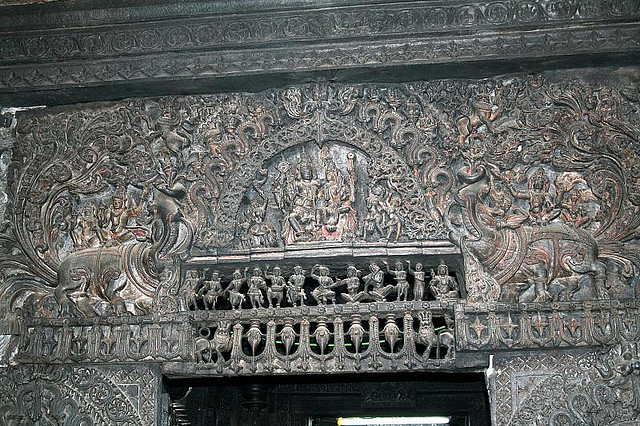
The Makara Thoranam above the door of the Garbhagriha of Hoysaleswara Temple, Halebidu. Two makaras are shown on either end of the arch.

==== Medieval South Indian iconography ====
In the medieval era of South India, Makara was shown as a fifth stage of development, symbolized in the form of an elephant head and body with an elaborately foliated fish tail. Most myths maintain this symbolism of this stage in the evolution of life. (Note makara in fifth row of animistic carvings in temple wall at right.)

==== Indonesian iconography ====
The temples of ancient Java is notable with the application of kala-makara as both decorative and symbolic elements of temple architecture. Kala is the giant head, often took place on the top of the entrance with makaras projected on either sides of kala's head flanking the portal or projecting on top corner as antefixes. Kala-makara theme also can be found on stairs railings on either sides. On upper part of stairs, the mouth of kala's head projecting makara downward. The intricate stone carving of twin makaras flanking the lower level of stairs with its bodies forming the stair's railings. These types of stairs decorations can be observed in Borobudur and Prambanan temples. Makara's trunks are often describes as handling gold ornaments or spouting jewels, while in its mouth often projected Gana dwarf figures or animals such as lions or parrots.

==== Khmer iconography ====
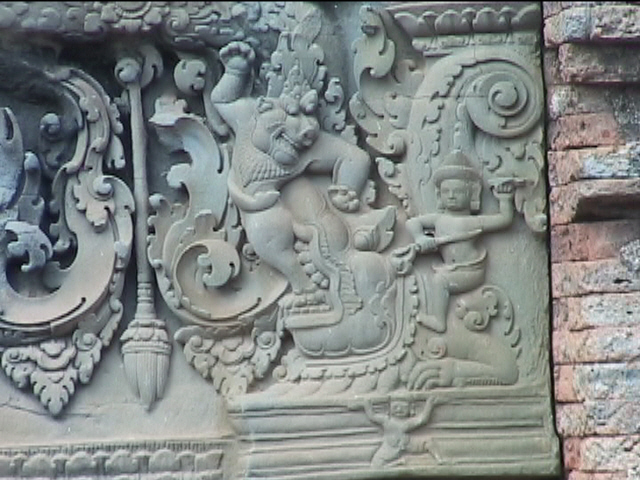
Makara disgorging a lion-like creature on corner of a lintel on one of the towers) surrounding the central pyramid at Bakong, Roluos, Cambodia

Makaras are also a characteristic motif of the religious Khmer architecture of the Angkor region of Cambodia which was the capital of the Khmer Empire. Makaras are usually part of the decorative carving on a lintel, tympanum, or wall. Makaras are usually depicted with another symbolic animal, such as a lion, naga or serpent, emerging from its gaping open mouth. Makara are a central design motif in the beautiful lintels of the Roluos group of temples: Preah Ko, Bakong, and Lolei. At Banteay Srei, carvings of makaras disgorging other monsters were installed on many of the buildings' corners.

==== Nepalese iconography ====
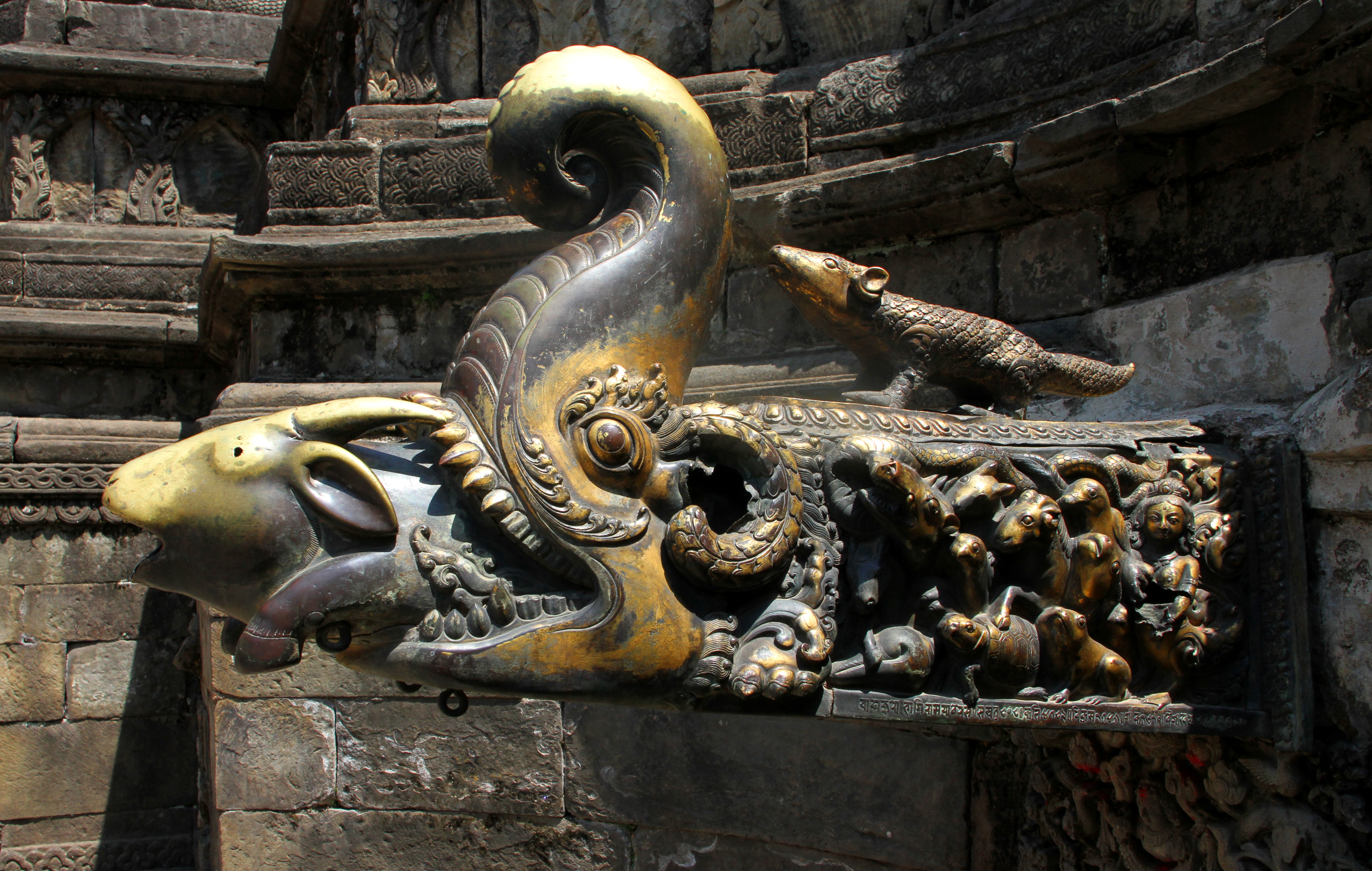
Dhunge dhara in Bhaktapur, Nepal

The architecture of Nepal uses this depiction extensively. In Newar architecture, its depiction is "as guardian of gateways, the makara image appears on the curved prongs of the vast crossed-vajra that encompasses the four gateways of the two-dimensional mandala. Of the three dimensional-mandala this crossed-vajra supports the whole structure of the mandala palace symbolizing the immovable stability of the vajra-ground on which it stands".

Most spouts of old Nepalese drinking fountains (called dhunge dhara) have the shape of a makara.

==== Sri Lankan iconography ====
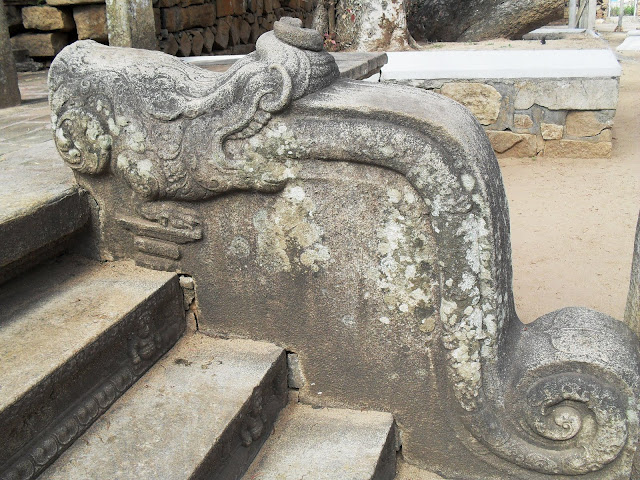
Dragon Balustrade at the entrance to Jaya Sri Maha Bodhi in Anuradhapura, Sri Lanka

Makara is the Sinhala term for dragon, an important figure in Sinhala Buddhist culture in Sri Lanka. It is depicted on toranas in temple architecture and objects of prestige such as in kastanes.

The Makara is widely used in Sri Lankan Buddhist architecture, often depicted on toranas. Since ancient time, easterners believe that Makara is one of watery creatures and even from the pre-era of the field of Buddhist art, Makara has been depicted both in work of literature and stone carvings. Makara gained a distinctive position in the Sinhala Buddhist culture - a special place not given in Buddhist artwork in other countries.

The Makaragala (dragon balustrade) is another kind of stone carvings which portray the Makara (dragon). These artworks used to decorate the entrance of Buddhist stupas, temples and Bo trees. There are two balustrades at main entrance of Lankatilaka Viharaya in Kandy and they are sometimes called Gajasinha balustrades because of the shape of the Makara there.

The Muragala (guardstone) has given a highest place to Makara. Over the head of the gatekeeper carved in there, the figures of Makara can be seen.

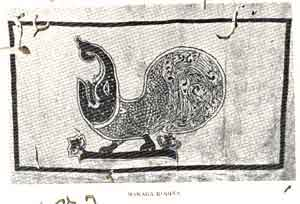
Karava Makara flag from Sri Lanka with elephant/fish head and peacock tail.

Sinhala Buddhist artists considered Makara the symbol of prosperity and self-sufficiency so they were not hesitant in portraying the sign of Makara in the entrance arch gateway to the religious places, such as temple, stupa or bodi. Precious examples for the above are Temple of the Tooth and Lankatilaka Temple in Kandy. Examples for the arched gateway with Makara over the image of Buddha can be seen in Ridi iharaya and Dambulla cave temple.

A figure of Makara has been carved to the handle of a temple key of Gadaladeniya Temple built in 1344 in Diggala in Kandy District.

The Makara has also been used as a clan symbol by the Karavas and Karaiyars of Sri Lanka, who both share similar origin and were collectively known as Kurukulam. Since at least 14 century AD, they have used Makara flags in their ceremonies. Clan titles such as Aditya and Varunakulasuriyan were used by them, to indicate their connection to ancient Hindu god Varuna.

==== Tibetan Buddhist iconography ====
In the Tibetan Buddhist format it evolved from the Indian form of makara. However, it is different in some ways such as, "display of lions fore paws, a horse's mane, the gills and tendrils of a fish, and the horns of a deer or dragon. From its once simple fishtail, sometimes feathered, now emerges as a complex spiraling floral pattern known as makara-tail design (Sanskritmakaraketu)".

In Tibetan iconography, it is depicted in the Vajrayana as a weapon of strength and tenacity. The Vajrayan weapons which have makara symbolism are: axe, iron hook, curved knife, vajra, and ritual dagger, in all of which the theme is "emergence of the blade from the open mouth of the makara".

Its symbolic representation in the form of a makara head at the corner of temple roofs is as water element which also functions as a "rainwater spout or gargoyle". It is also seen as water spouts at the source of a spring. The artistic carving in stone is in the form of identical pair of makaras flanked by two Nāgas (snake gods) along with a crown of Garuda, which is called the kirtimukha face. Such depictions are also seen at the entrance of wooden doorways as the top arch and also as a torana behind Buddha's images.

== Distribution of iconography ==
Stone sculptures of the mythological Makara and its ancient place in the iconography of Hinduism and Buddhism are widely spread throughout South Asia and Southeast Asia. Examples from ten countries are shown below:

Makara sculptures throughout South Asia and Southeast Asia

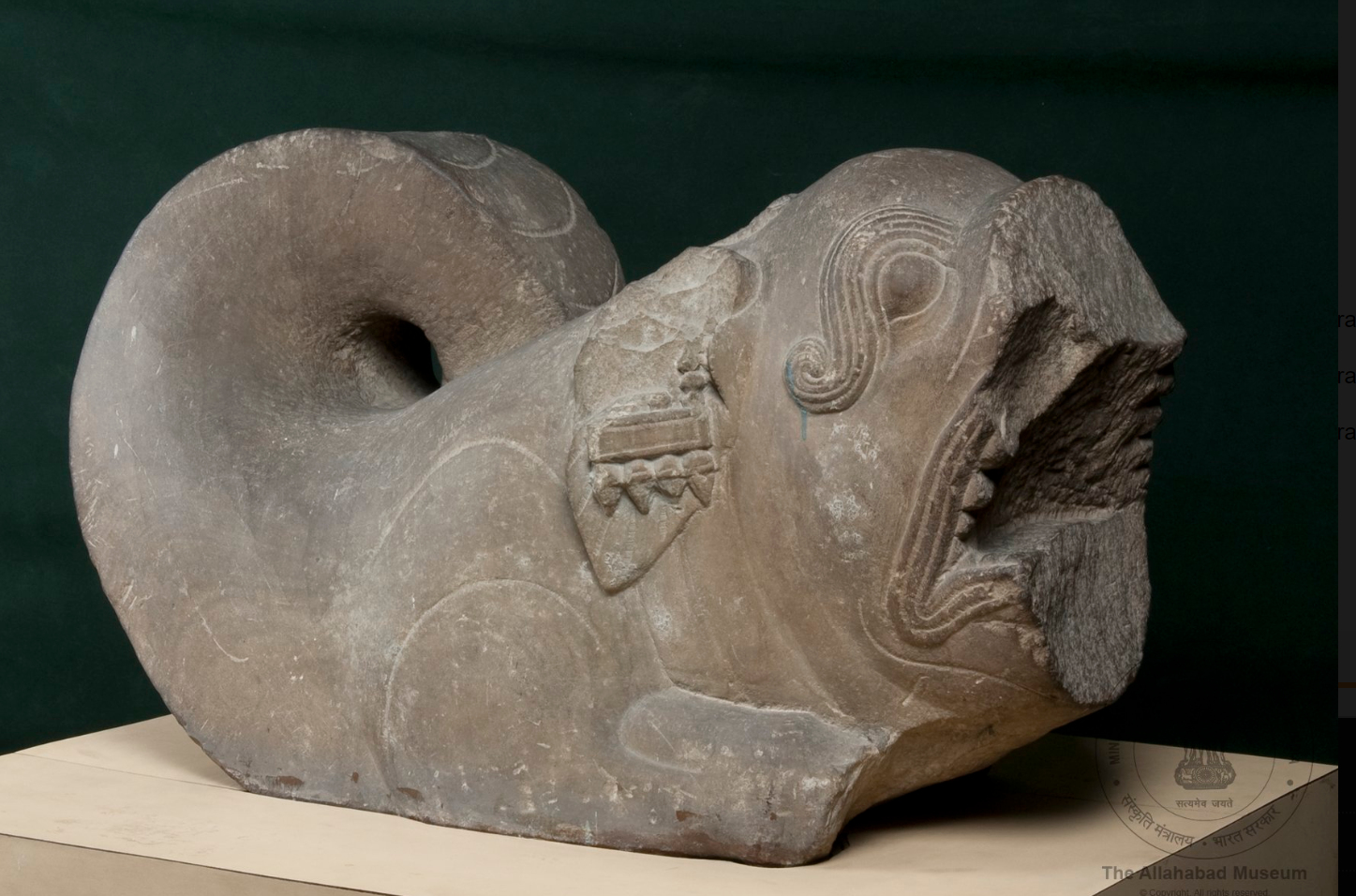
Kaushambi Makara pillar capital, 2nd century BCE

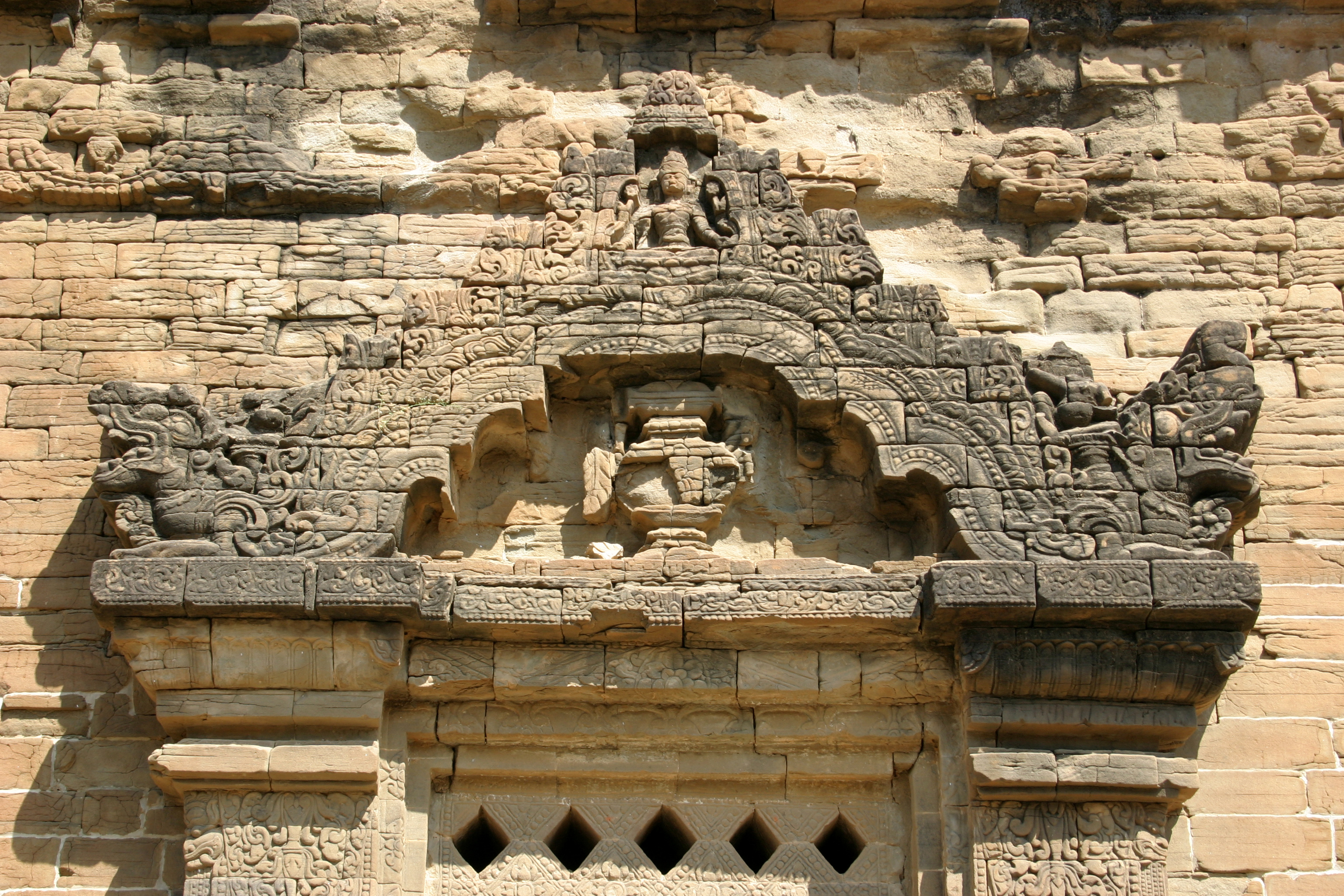
Makara at Nanpaya Temple, Bagan, Burma

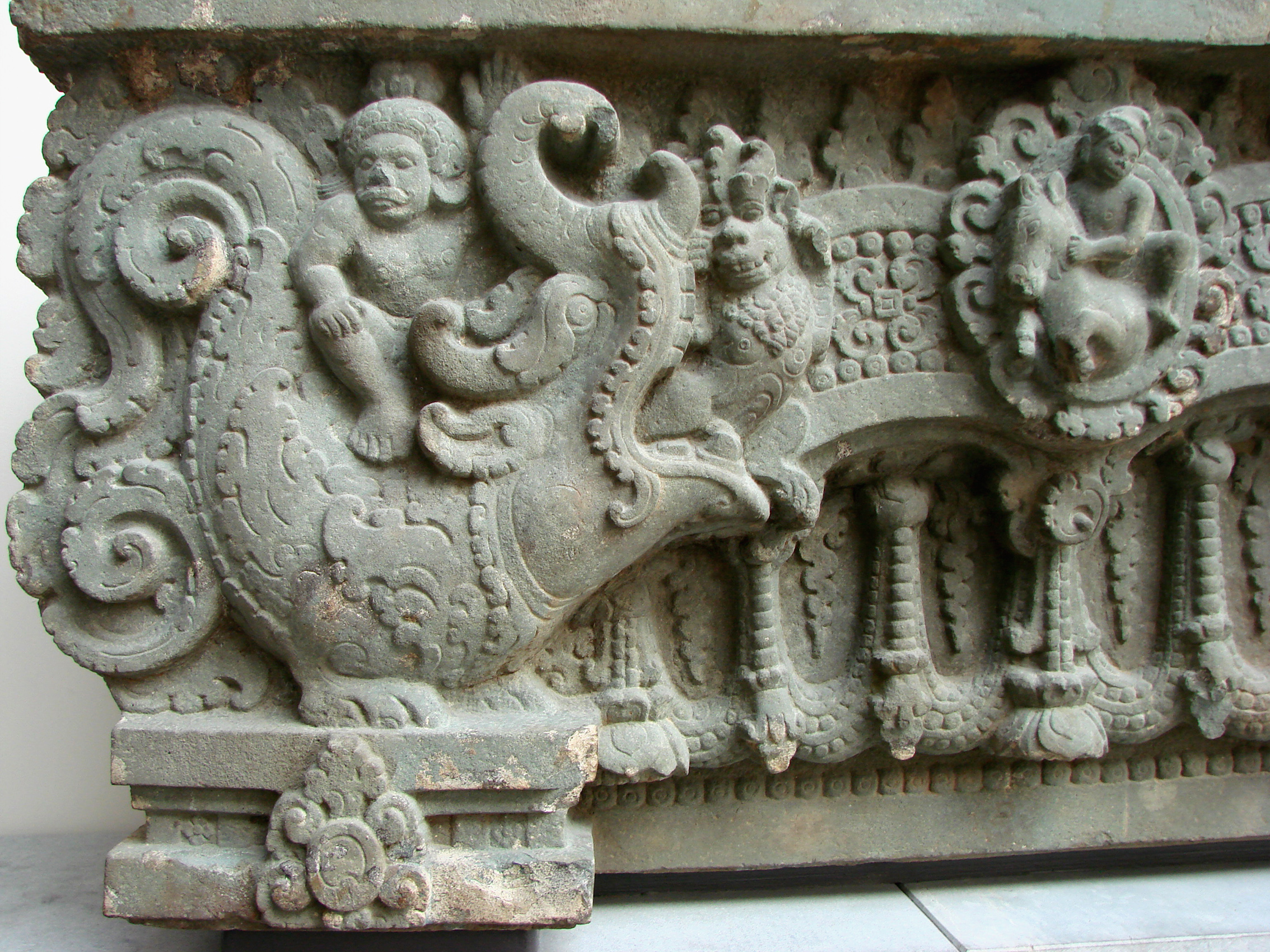
Makara on lintel from Sambor Prei Kuk temple, Kampong Thom City, Cambodia

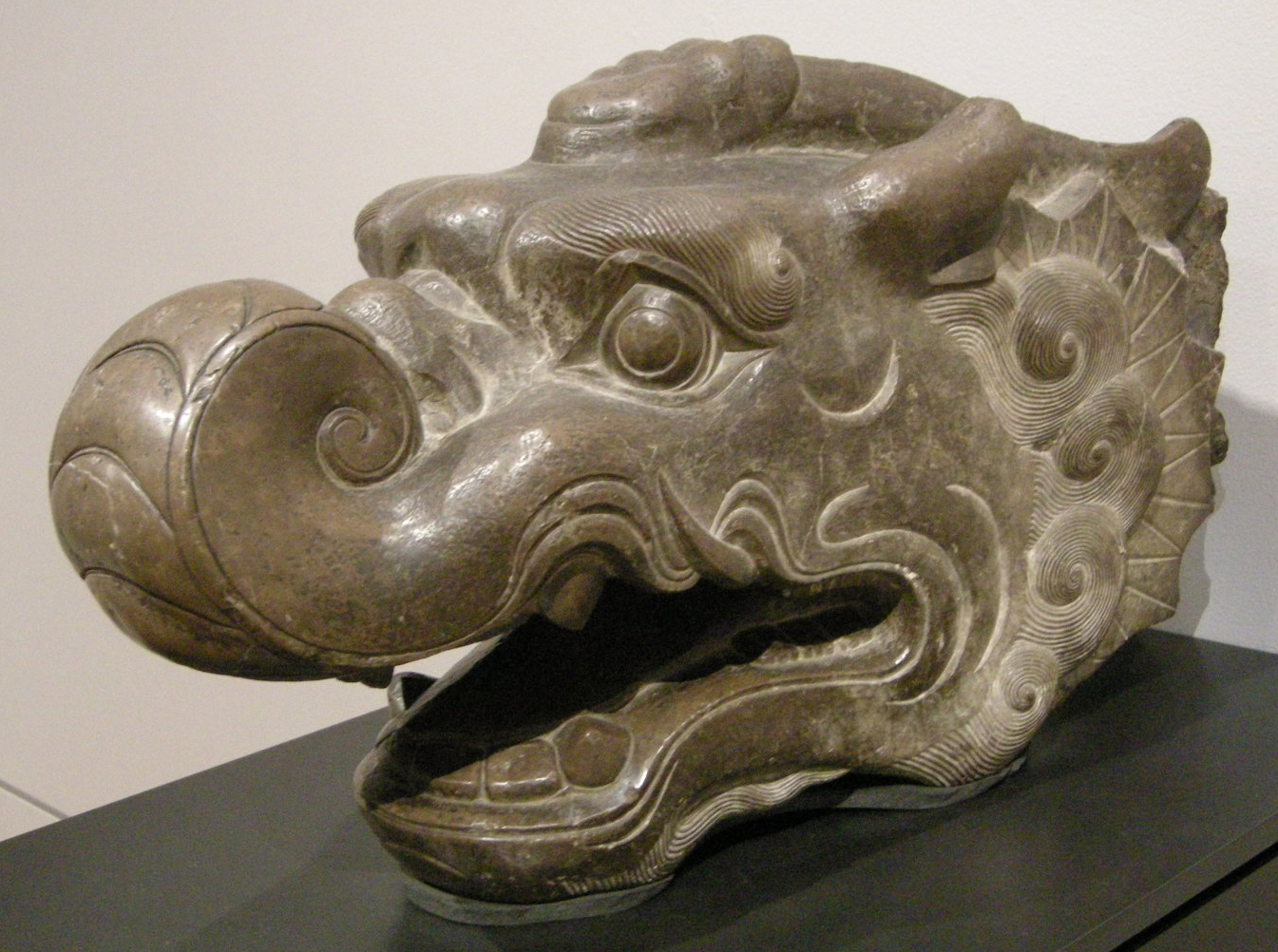
Makara from Northern Qi Dynasty (CE 550-577), China

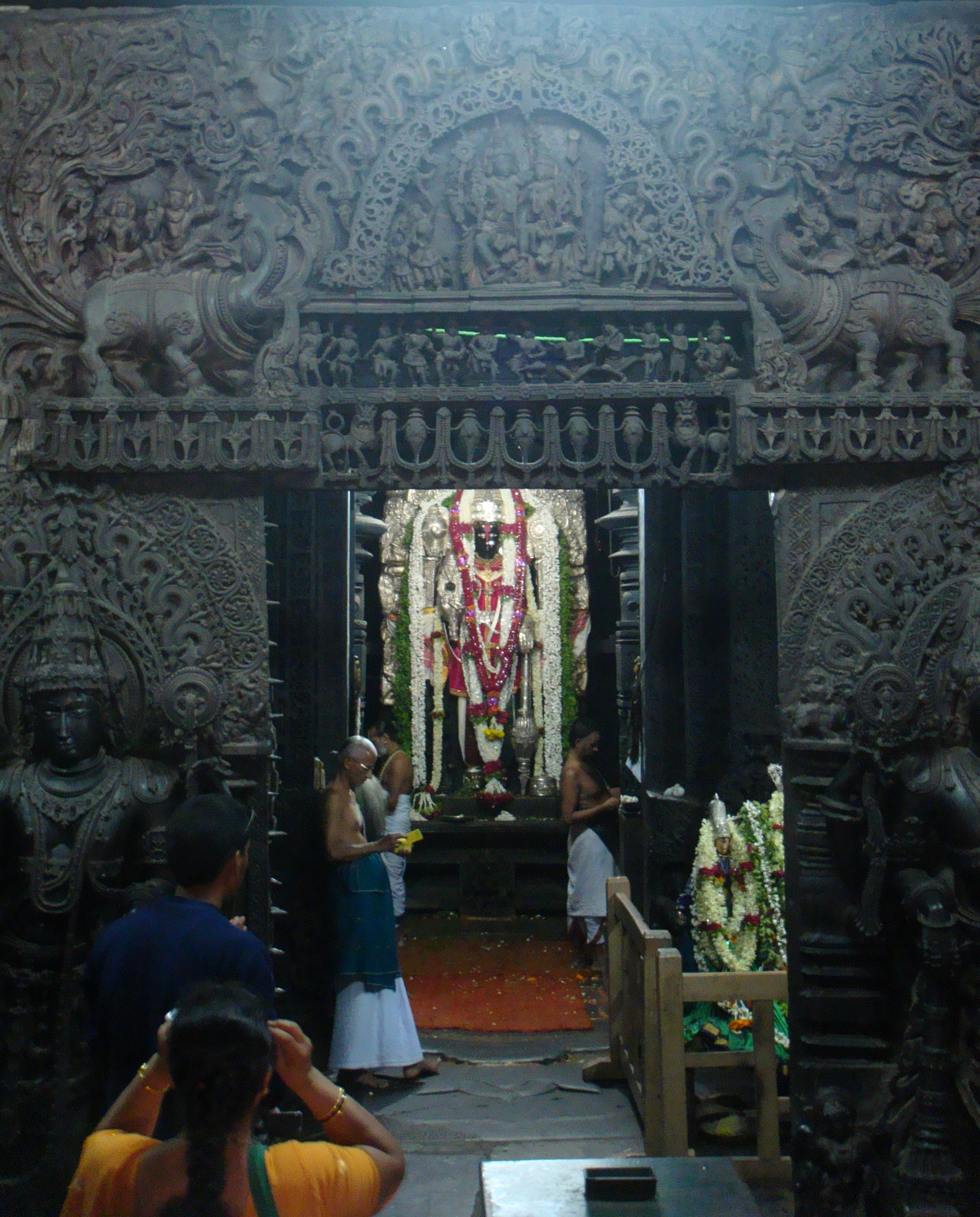
Makara and Kirtimukha protecting portal of Chennakesava Temple at Belur, India

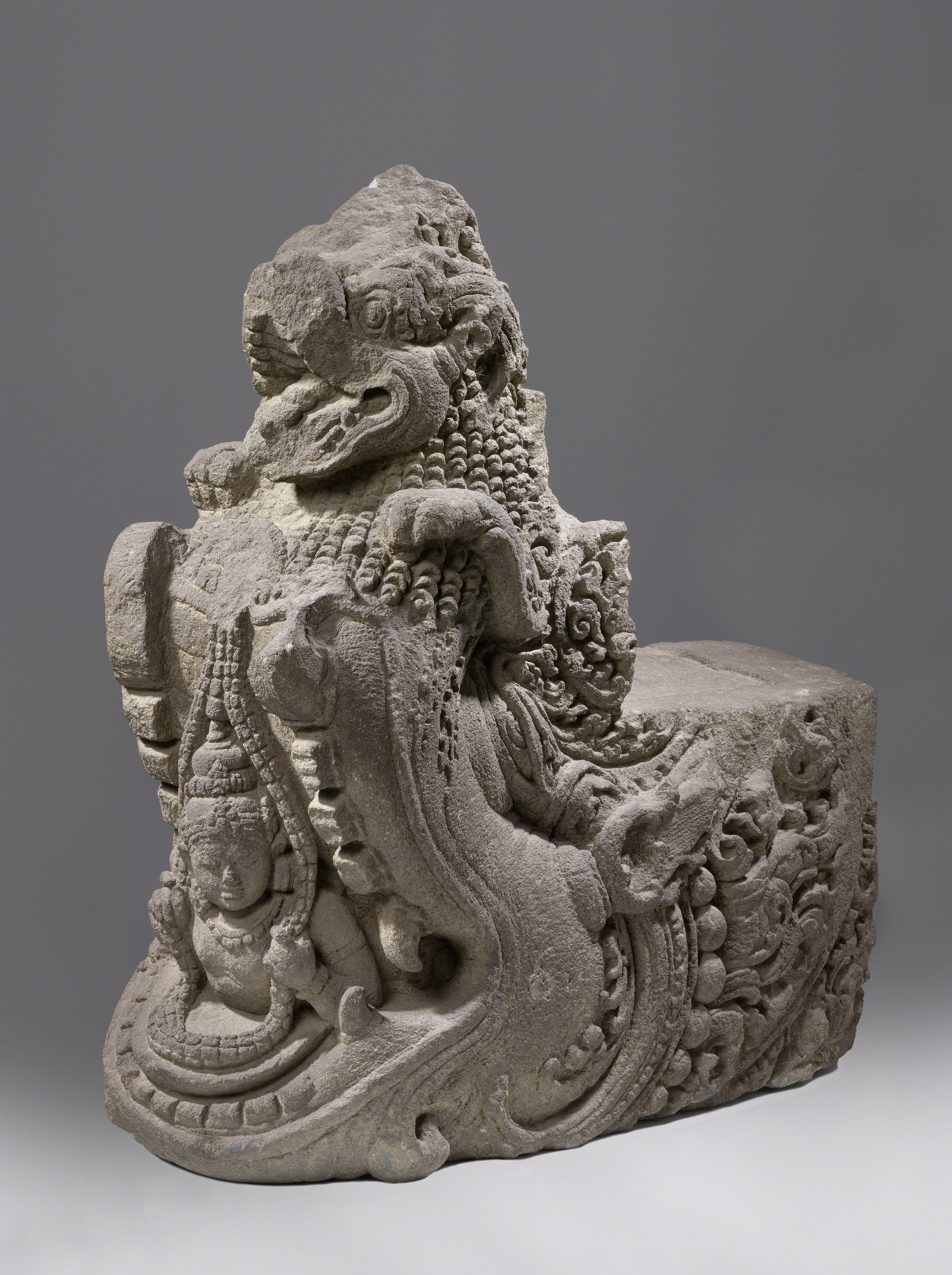
Makara stairs adornment from Bubrah temple, Central Java, Indonesia

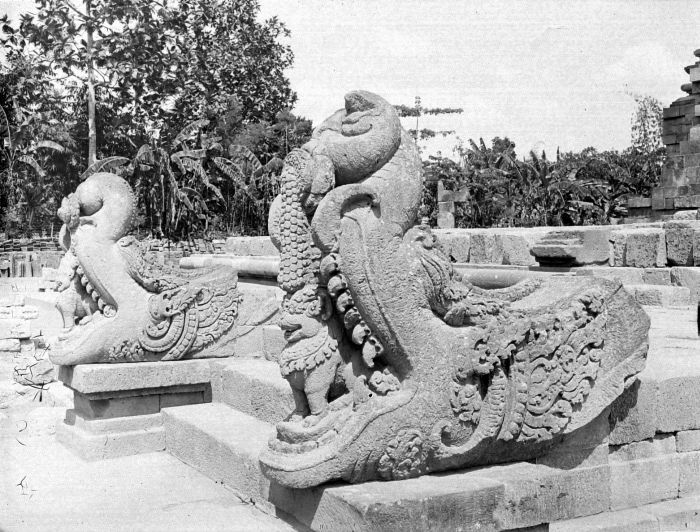
Makara sculptures at the Candi Kalasan Temple, Indonesia

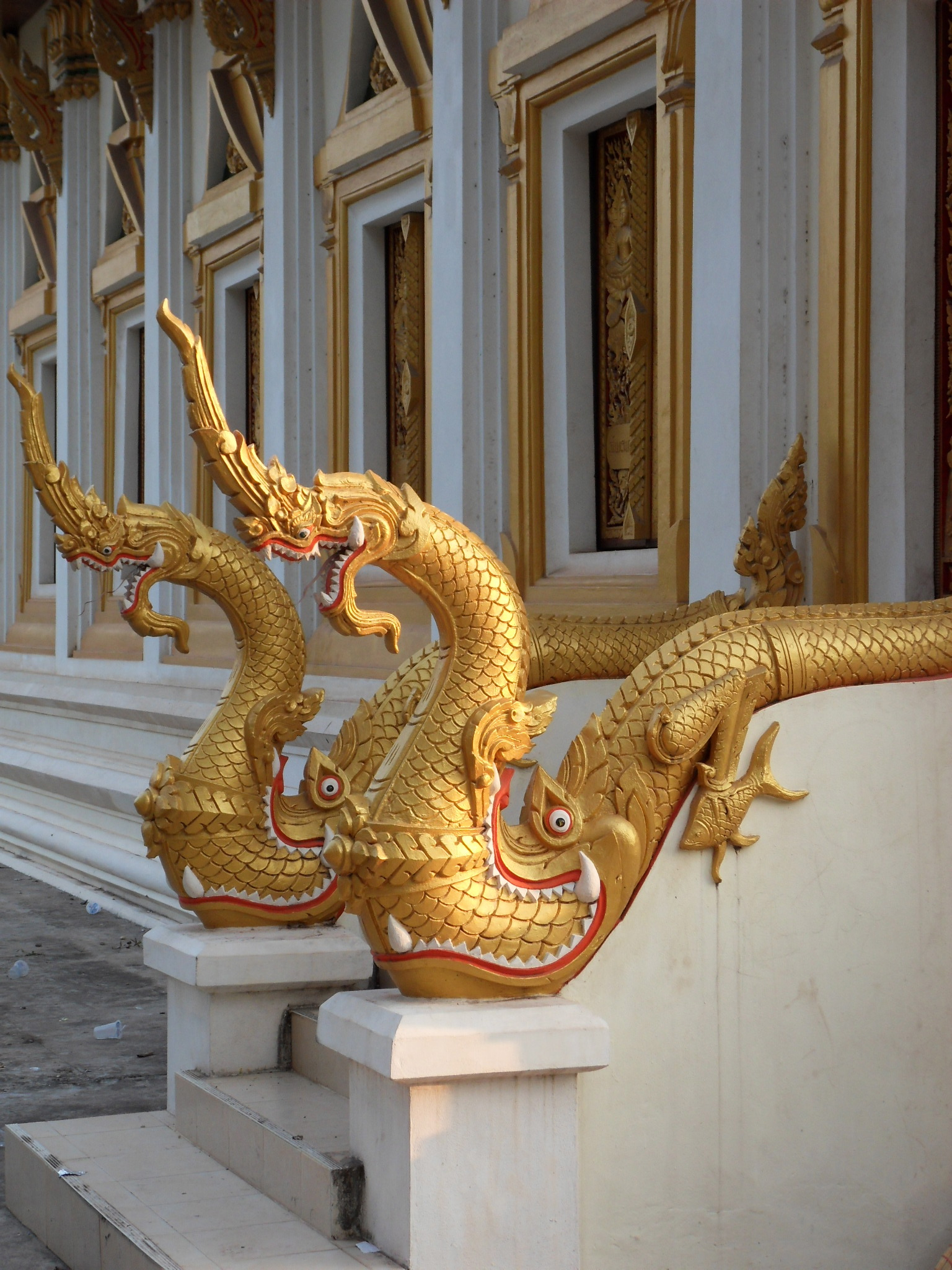
Nagas emerging from Makara mouths at Wat ThatPhun, Vientiane, Laos

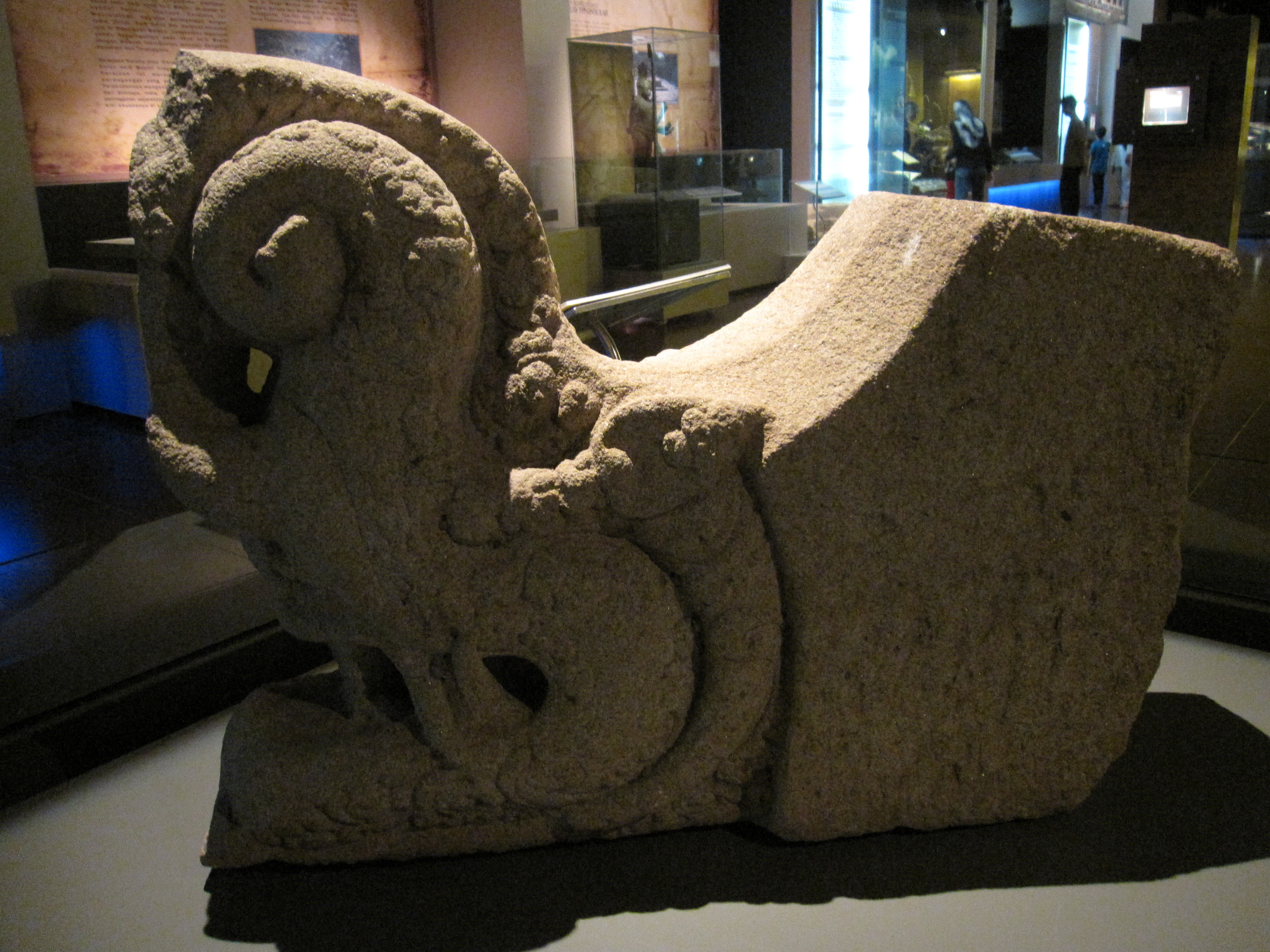
Makara from the 7th century CE at National Museum Kuala Lumpur, Malaysia

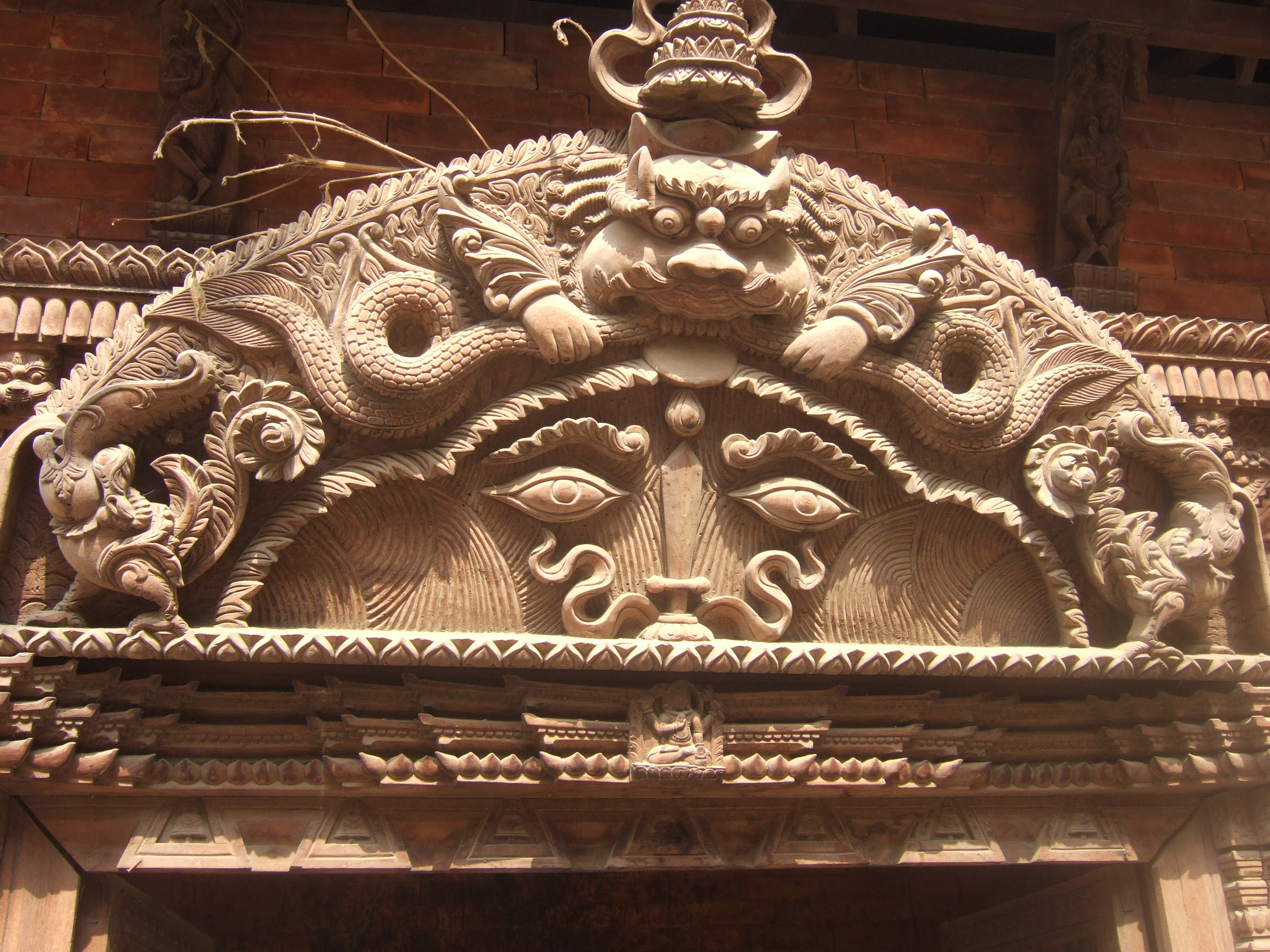
Makara and Kirtimukha at Hindu temple in Kathmandu, Nepal

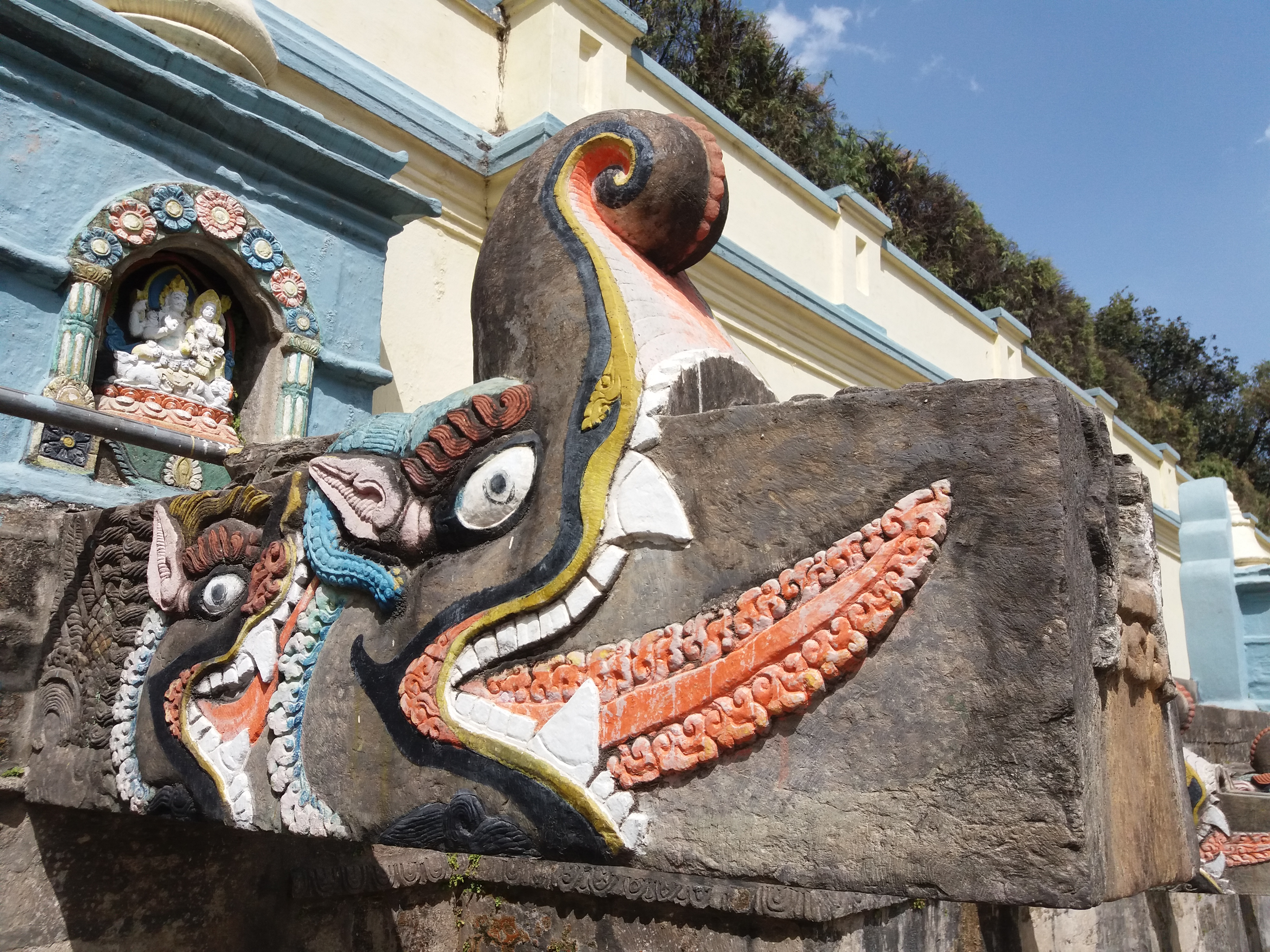
Hiti Manga in the Balaju Water Garden. Almost all stone taps in Nepal depict this Makara

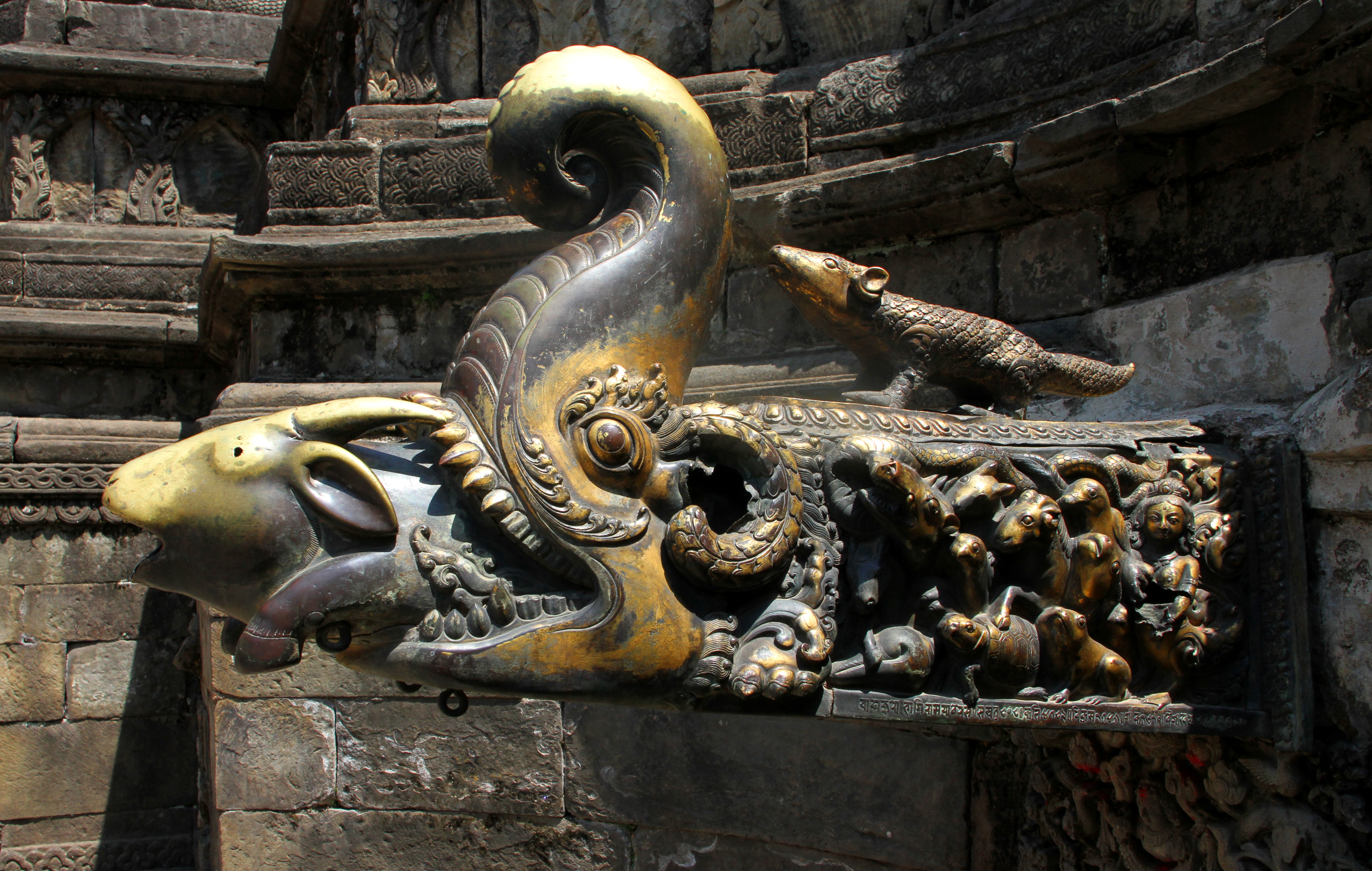
Hiti Manga in Bhaktapur, Nepal

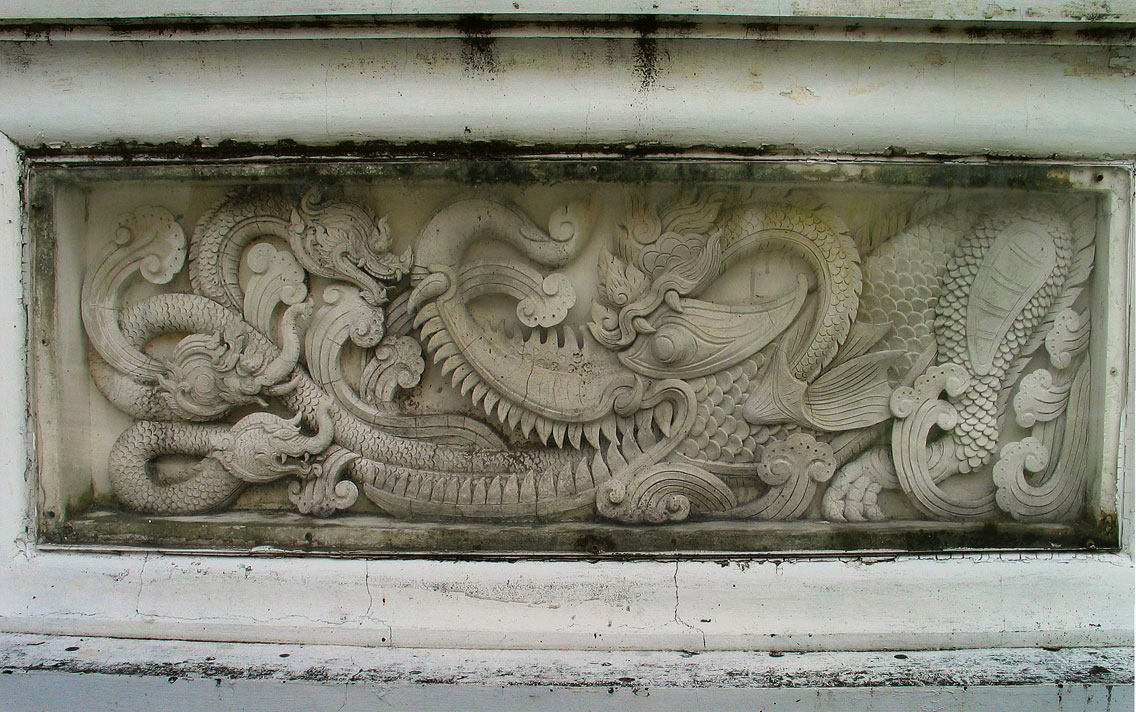
Makara with Nagas, Wat Suthat, Bangkok, Thailand

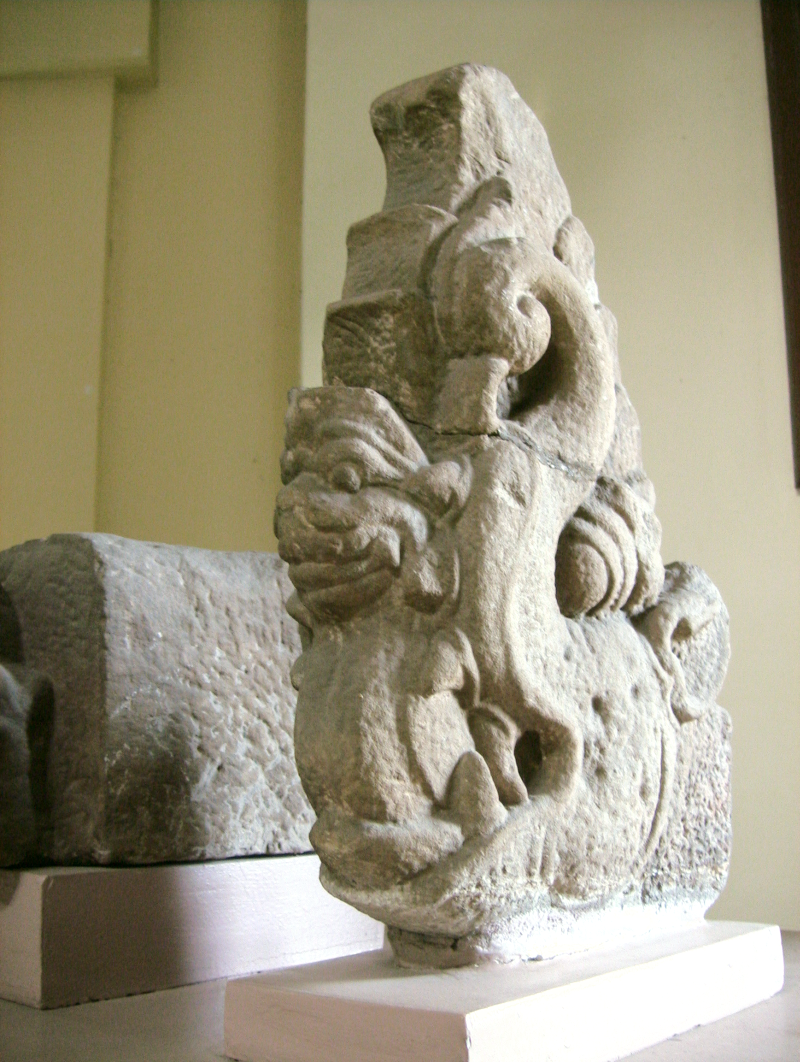
Cham god Nāga emerging from mouth of Makara at the National Museum of Vietnamese History

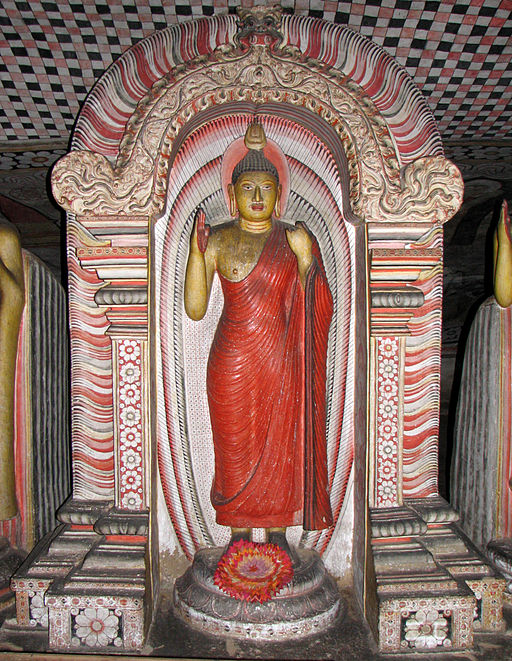
Makara pandol over the image of Buddha in Dambulla cave temple, Sri Lanka.

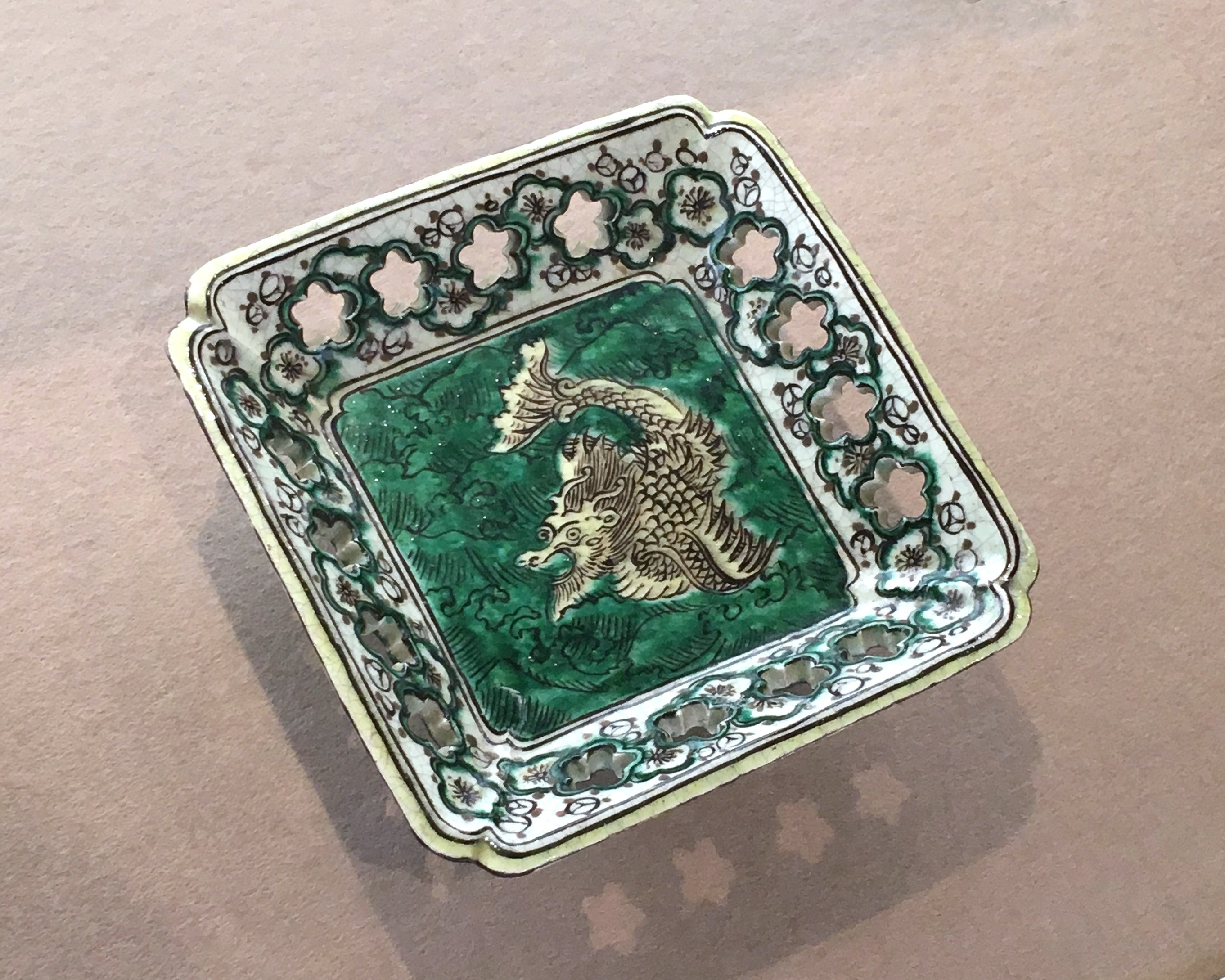
Sasashima ware square bowl, makara design. Edo period, 19th century

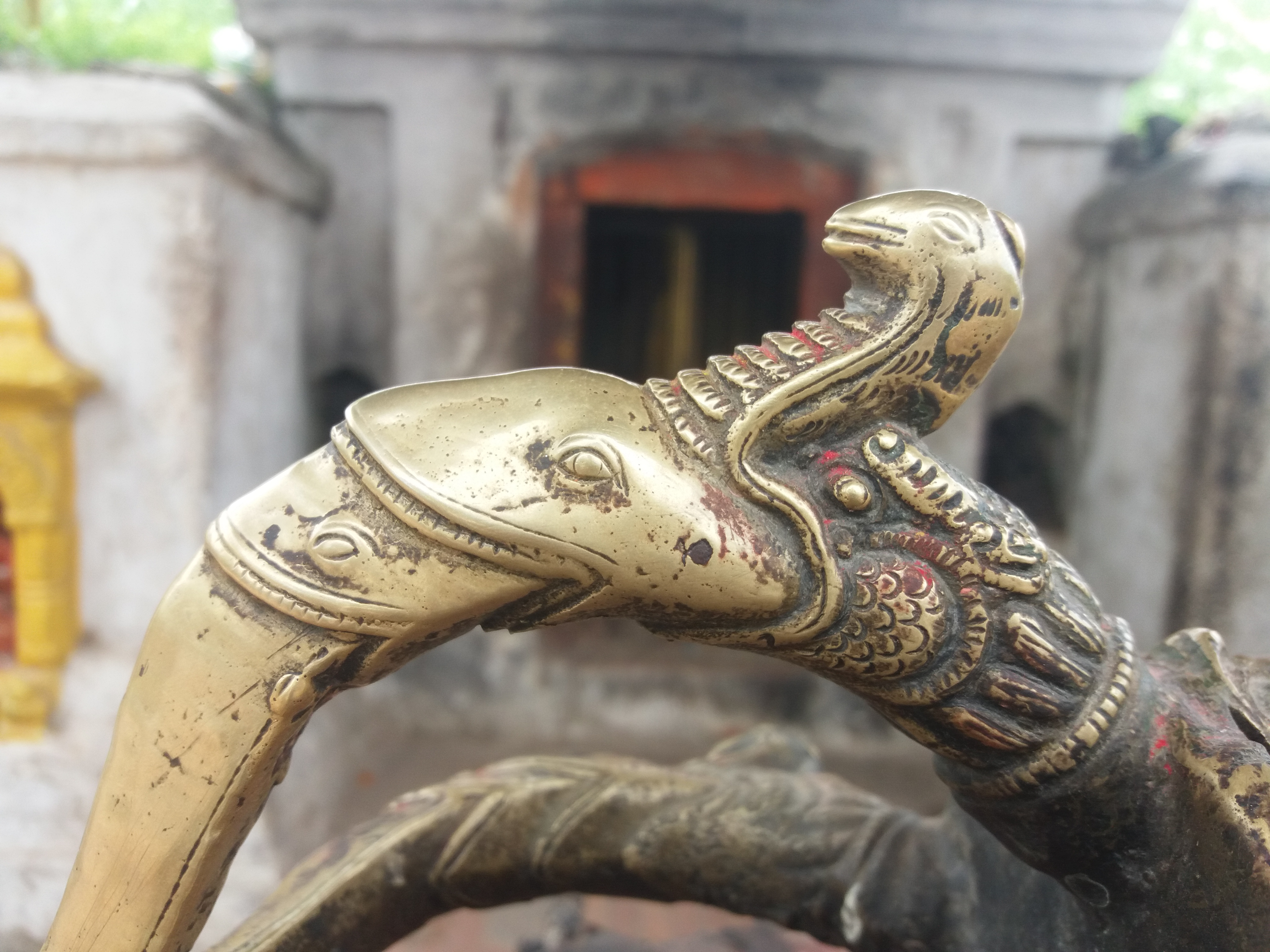
One of the ribs of a vajra, Ashok Stupa, Patan, Nepal

== See also ==
- Capricorn (astrology)
- Dashavatara
- Dhunge dhara
- Gamzee Makara
- Shachihoko
- Vahana
- Cipactli

== Bibliography ==
- Perera, ADTA (Sep–Oct 1975). "Makara - crafted with mattock (ගල් කටුවෙන් පණ ගැන්වූ මකරා)". Religious News (ශාසන ප්‍රවෘත්ති) (in Sinhala). Vol. 5, no. 1–2. Colombo: Religious Division of Department of Cultural Affairs. pp. 6–7.
- Schokman, Derrick (12 April 2003). "The Kusta Raja Gala". Daily News.
