= Korawakgala =

Sri Lankan Buddhist architectural features

Korawakgala, or koravakgal (Sinhala: කොරවක්ගල) (wingstones), are stone balustrades, which are located on either side of the stairs/steps leading to the entrance or door of a religious building or structure. They form one of three distinct architectural features at the entrance of most Buddhist structures in Sri Lanka, being the sandakada pahana (moonstone), muragala (guardstones) and the korawakgala (wingstones).

The earliest known korawakgalas were simple and plain structures with no decorations at all, with time they evolved into elaborate structures with exquisite detailed carvings. Korawakgala were initially constructed out of wood and then were built using bricks, without any carvings on them. These bricks were moulded in curved shapes to fit in. As they evolved simple stone plaques replaced the brick work. These plaques were detailed only with a few geometric lines to highlight the shape, later, a simple pot or a pillar was added on the exterior wall of the structure.

The structures subsequently evolved into a smoother shape, curving its edges and then a decorated floral design, incorporating flowers and leaves, entangled together. The most advanced stage of the korawakgala is a makaragala (dragonstones), which incorporates the addition of a heavily decorated makara (dragon), a mythological creature, which consists of various body parts from numerous different animals. Each of these body parts represent the strongest characteristic of that animal. In addition to these, this imaginary beast is often depicted as breathing flames from its mouth.

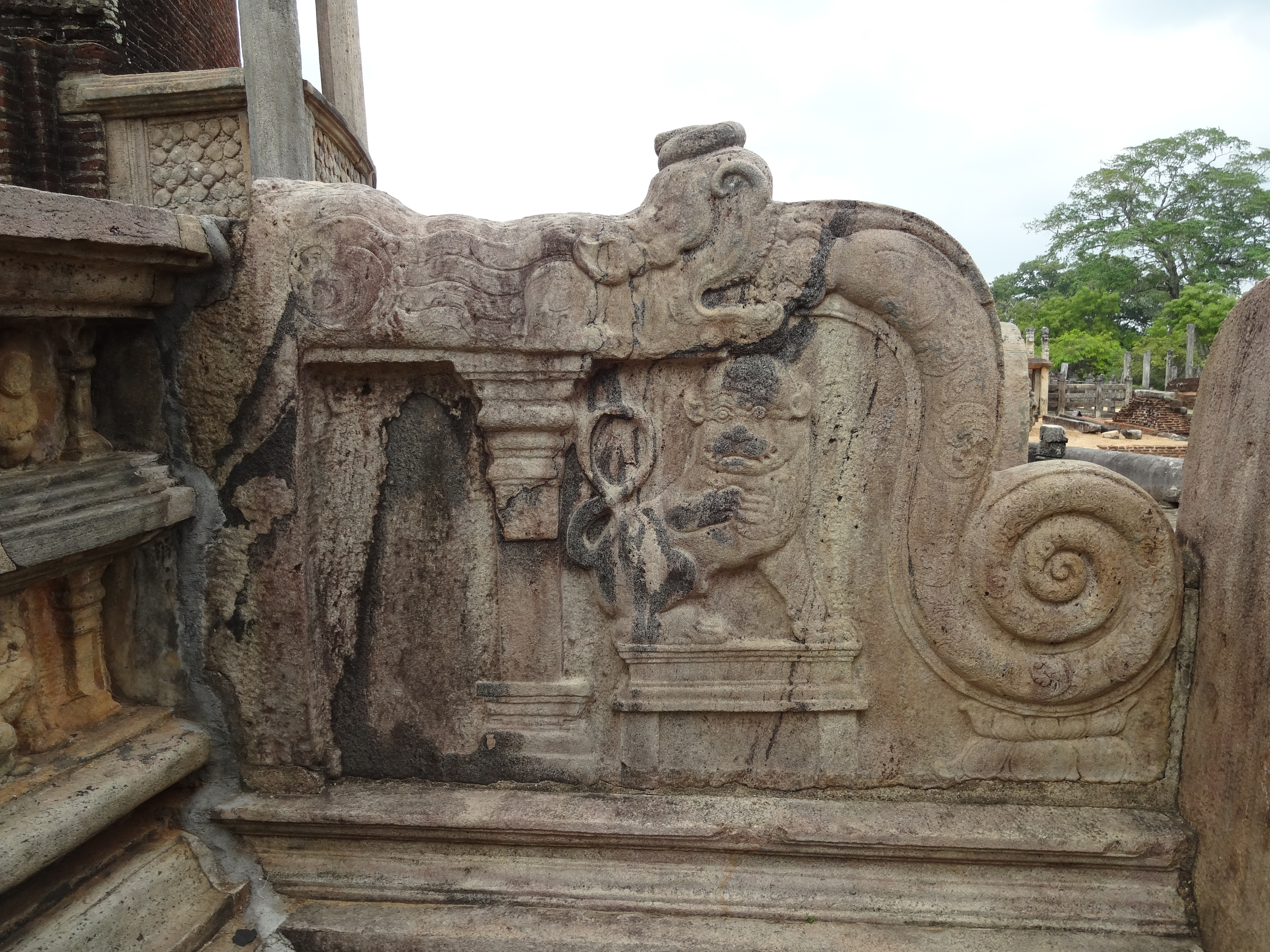
The korawakgala at the Polonnaruwa Vatadage (2017)

- elephant's trunk, representing dexterity
- lion's paws, strength
- crocodile's jaw, demand for respect
- boar's ears, acute hearing
- fishes body, movement
- peacocks tail feathers, splendid beauty.

The makara and floral motifs were often combined, and in some cases, both the outer and inner walls of the korawakgala were intricately carved. However, it is rare to find korawakgalas with decorated inner walls, as the majority remain plain and unadorned.

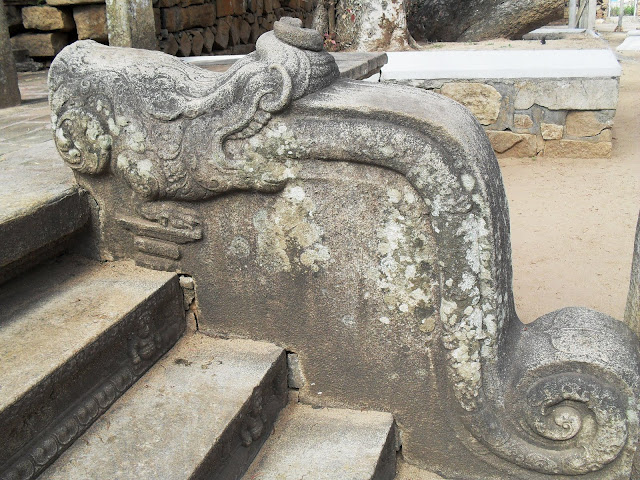
Korawakgula at the entrance to Jaya Sri Maha Bodhi in Anuradhapura

There are two such balustrades at the main entrance of Lankatilaka Viharaya in Kandy. They are sometimes referred to as Gajasinha balustrades due to the distinctive makara design carved in the form of a lion-elephant figure.

== See also ==
- Muragala
- Sandakada pahana
