= Muragala =

Muragala or muru gal, also known as a guardstone, are a unique feature of the Sinhalese architecture of ancient Sri Lanka. The muragala is a set of twin oblong slabs of stone, with a rounded top, located at the foot of the flight of steps, leading to a place of worship, situated on a higher elevation.

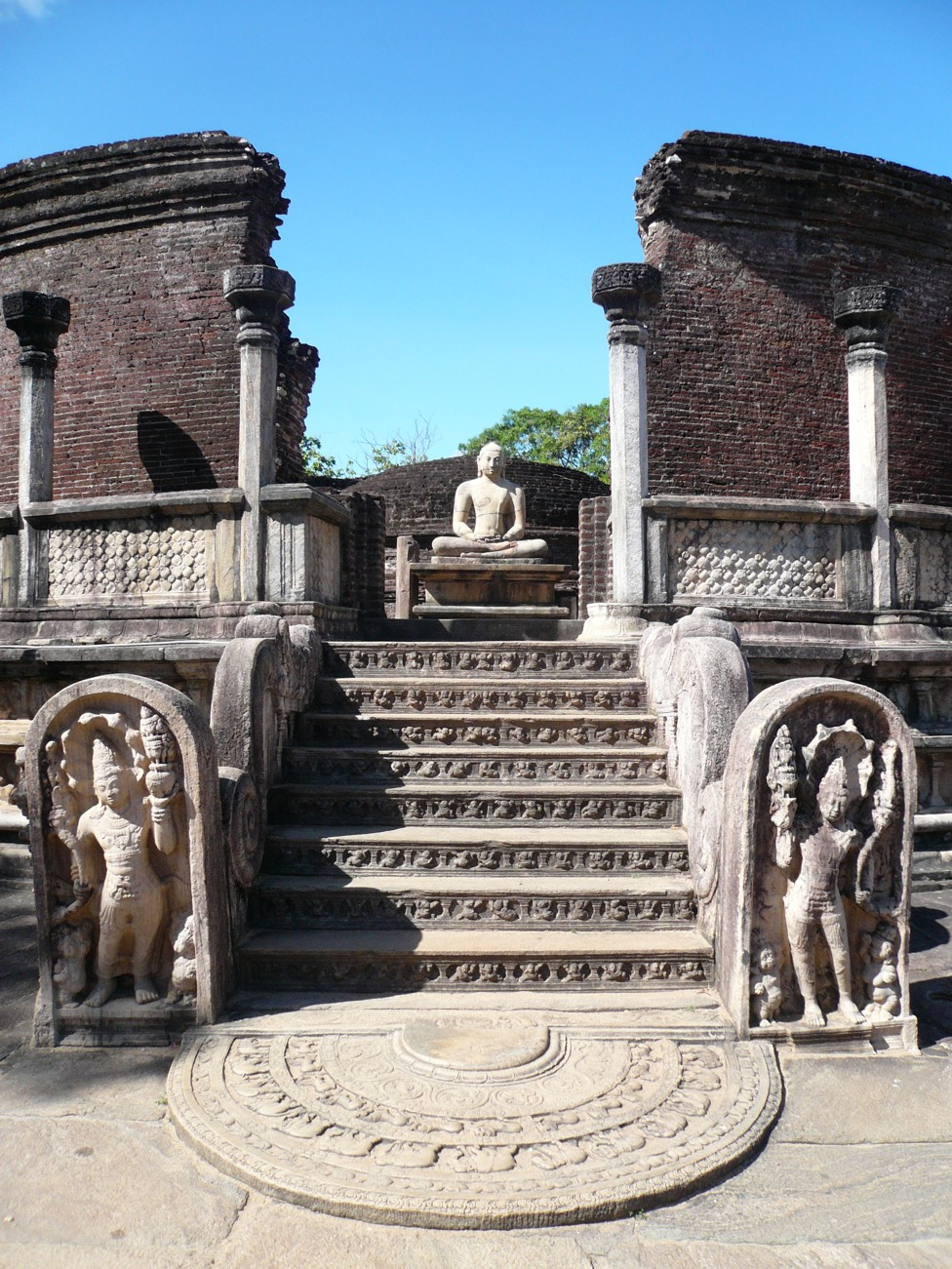
Entrance to Polonnaruwa Vatadage, with the two stone muragala located on either side of the staircase.

The evolution of the muragala is closely linked to the evolution of the Sandakada pahana (or moonstone). Charles Godakumbura, the Commissioner of Archaeology in Ceylon from 1956 to 1967, described the evolution of the muragala from its origins as a painted wooden plank or a stone terminal slab, serving as a stop wedge at the lower end of a slanting rail or balustrade (korawakgala) through to its final form as an elaborate carved stone. He distinguished five phases in its evolution:

- firstly, pieces of valuable wood;
- secondly, plain stone slabs;
- thirdly, stones with an incised pūrṇaghaṭa (vessels of abundance) motif, subsequently rendered in low or high relief;
- fourthly, stones where the carvings are replaced by figures of Bahirava or dwarfs, one on each stone, usually depicting Śańkha and Padma, attendants of Kuvera (God of Wealth), or bhūtas (powerful protective ghosts/spirits);
- final phase, which is the most common in the more important monastic buildings at Anuradhapura, features elaborately carved anthropomorphic nāgarājas (snake gods), typical of the latter stages of the Anuradhapura period and the subsequent Polonnaruwa period.

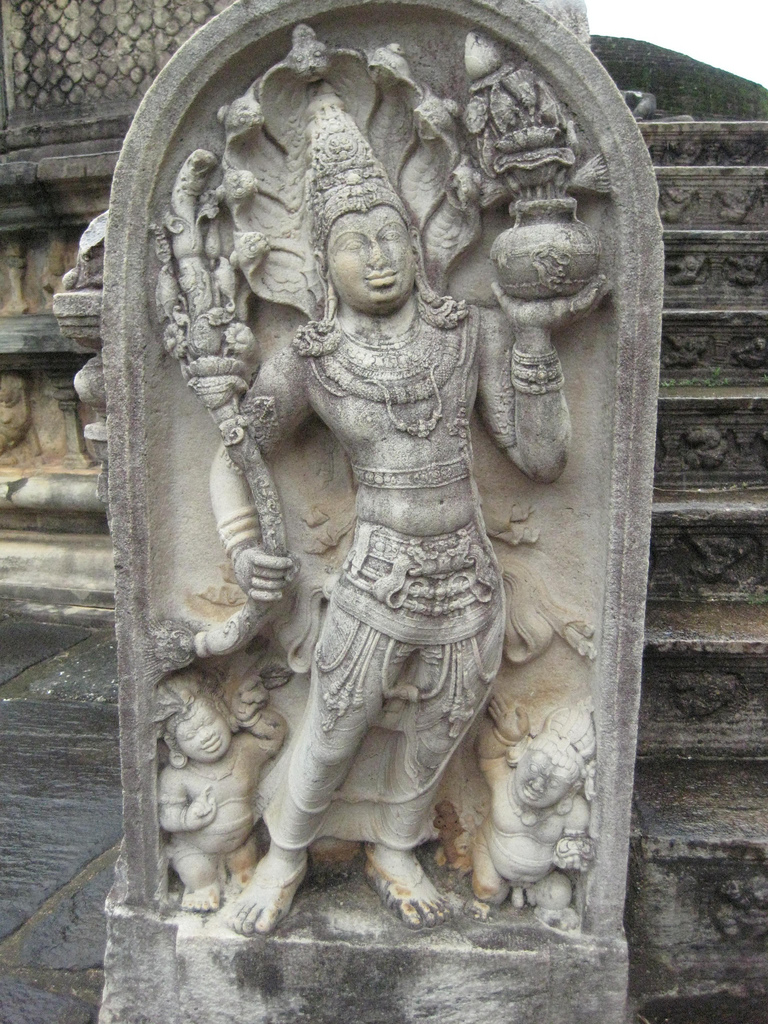
A close-up of the muragala, depicting the naga-raja. In one hand he holds a pūrṇaghaṭa and in the other a sprouting branch complete with leaves, buds and flowers. Around his head is a seven-hooded cobra hood. The two minor figures at his feet are Śańkha and Padma.

More recently archaeologists consider that muragala merely served as a decorative feature, rather than a structural purpose.

The earliest muragala dates back to the early period of the Anuradhapura Kingdom (approximately 1st century A.D). Over time, the architects switched to the use of stone, as it was a more enduring material. The next stage in the evolution of the guardstones was the inclusion of carvings, however it has been difficult for archaeologists to determine exactly when these changes began to take place. During the middle period (2nd century AD – 6th century AD) and the latter period (7th century AD – 11th century AD) of the Anuradhapura Kingdom, stone workers began to carve the image of dwarves (Śaṅkha and Padma) on the muragala. It was during latter stages of the Anuradhapura Kingdom, that muragala with the images of Nāgarājas were carved. This however was not strictly a consecutive evolution but a succession of overlapping developments, with the most evolved pūrṇaghaṭa motifs not necessarily pre-dating the earliest Nāgarājas carvings.

== See also ==
- Korawakgala
- Sandakada pahana
