= Kurukula =

Kurukula may refer to:

- Karave, a caste of the Sri Lankan Sinhalese people
- Karaiyar, a caste of the Sri Lankan Tamils
