= Cox's Bazar (disambiguation) =

Cox's Bazar is a city situated in south-eastern Bangladesh.

Cox's Bazar may also refer to:

== Geography ==
- Cox's Bazar Beach, a beach in the same place
- Cox's Bazar District, a district in Bangladesh
- Cox's Bazar Sadar Upazila

== Transport ==
- Cox's Bazar Airport, Cox's Bazar
- Cox's Bazar–Teknaf Marine Drive
- Cox's Bazar railway station
- Cox's Bazar Express
- Cox's Bazar bus terminal

== Constituency ==
- Cox's Bazar-1
- Cox's Bazar-2
- Cox's Bazar-3
- Cox's Bazar-4

== Educational institutions ==
- Cox's Bazar International University
- Cox's Bazar Medical College
- Cox's Bazar Government College
- Cox's Bazar Government High School

== Others ==
- Cox's Bazar Stadium
- Cox's Bazar Development Authority
