= Sayeman Beach Resort =

Hotel in Cox's Bazar, Bangladesh

- সায়মন বিচ রিসোর্ট
- Interactive map of the Sayeman Beach Resort area
- Former names: Sayeman Hotel

General information
- Status: Open
- Architectural style: Modern
- Location: Kolatoli Square, Marine Drive Road, Cox's Bazar, Bangladesh
- Coordinates: 21.4141449°N 91.9840863°E
- Groundbreaking: 8 October, 2013
- Opening: 15 January, 2015
- Operator: Mahboob Rahman Ruhel

Technical details
- Floor count: 11

Design and construction
- Awards and prizes: South Asian Travel Awards (2019)
- Known for: First private hotel in the city

Other information
- Number of rooms: 228
- Public transit access: Cox's Bazar railway station

Website
- sayemanresort.com

Sayeman Beach Resort is a five-star seaside resort located by Kolatoli Square in Cox's Bazar, Bangladesh. It is the successor of Sayeman Hotel, the first private hotel of the city. The construction of the resort was started initially in 2013 and completed in 2015.

== History ==
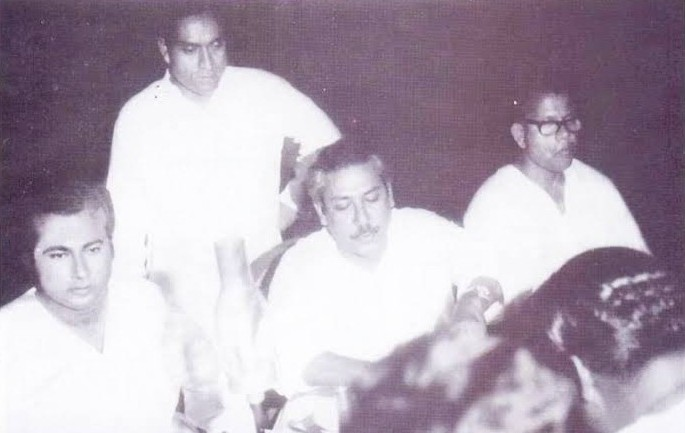
Sheikh Mujibur Rahman in Hotel Sayeman, 1969

In 1964, Sayedur Rahman established a private hotel named "Hotel Sayeman" in Cox's Bazar, East Pakistan. It was the first privately owned hotel in the city. Five years later, in 1969, Mosharraf Hossain, son of the hotel's founder, and Sheikh Mujibur Rahman stayed at this hotel during a trip to Cox's Bazar, and a candlelight dinner was organized in their honor. In independent Bangladesh in 1979, Mosharraf Hossain converted it into a resort with 75 rooms. Later Sheikh Hasina and Sheikh Rehana were also guests of this hotel. In 2013 it was announced to build a resort condominium called "Sayeman Heritage Residence" in place of the old hotel and the hotel was shifted from Baharchora to Kolatoli which was renamed as "Sayeman Beach Resort". The new resort was inaugurated on 15 January 2015 in the presence of Rashed Khan Menon, the then minister of civil aviation and tourism.

== Features ==
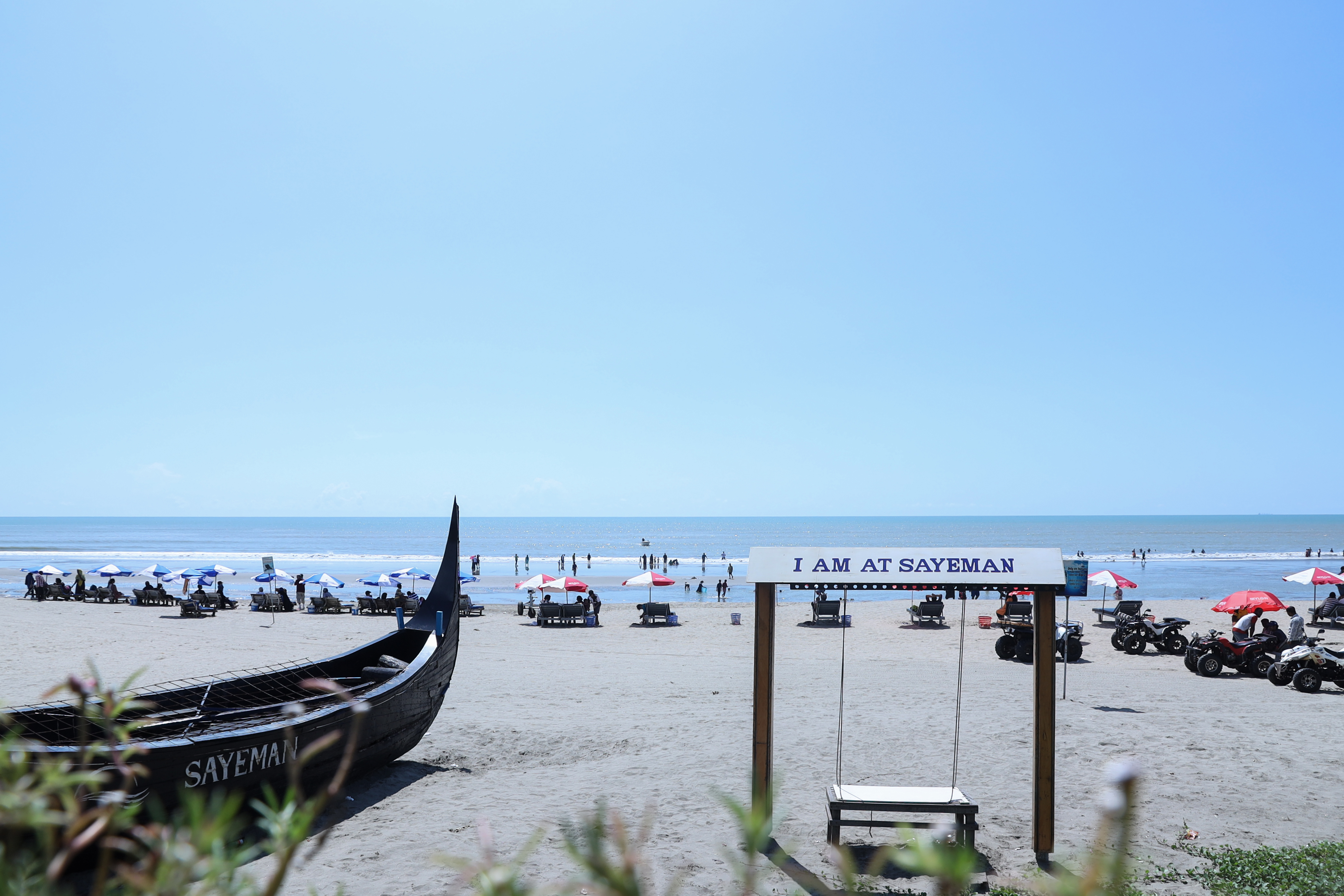
Beach in front of the resort

The Cox's Bazar beach can be seen from most of the rooms of this 288-room resort. There are ocean and deluxe suites, restaurants, swimming pools, bar deck, ballroom and convention hall.

== Tax evasion ==
According to a report published by Income Tax Department in 2021, no income tax return has been submitted by the resort authority for 6 years from 2015. After publication of the report, the authority paid ৳4 million in advance as income tax return. The report also noted that the resort had falsified their income.

== Pollution ==
In 2019, the Environment Department fined the authority ৳50,000 for allegedly dumping polluted water into the sea.

== Lawsuit ==
In 1999, 15 square kilometers of coastal area of Cox's Bazar was legally declared as a protected area for environmental reasons, but the Sayeman Beach Resort authority took the land of the area on lease to build the resort at Kolatoli. In 2019, a lawsuit ruled that the lease was invalid and the resort building was ordered to be demolished.

== Award ==
In 2019, Sayeman Beach Resort won South Asian Travel Awards (SATA) award under leading beach resort category. In an event was held in Sri Lanka, the award was given to Mahboob Rahman, managing director of the resort. It again became recipient of the award in 2024.
