= Nurul Amin (Chittagong politician) =

Bangladeshi politician (born 1968)

- নুরুল আমিন

Member of Parliament
- Incumbent
- Assumed office 17 February 2026
- Preceded by: Mahboob Rahman Ruhel
- Constituency: Chittagong-1

Personal details
- Born: 10 January 1968 (age 58) Patakot, Mirsharai, East Pakistan
- Party: Bangladesh Nationalist Party
- Spouse: Nurunnahar
- Children: 4 sons & 3 daughters
- Parents: Abul Khair (father); Talimunnesa (mother)
- Education: Al Jamia Al Islamia Patiya
- Occupation: Politician

Nurul Amin (known as Nurul Amin Chairman; born 10 January 1968) is a Bangladeshi politician. He is an elected member of parliament from Chittagong-1 (Mirsharai) constituency.

== Early life ==
Nurul Amin was born on 10 January 1968 to a Bengali family in the village of Patakot in Osmanpur Union, Mirsarai, then part of the Chittagong District of East Pakistan. He was a son of popular Islamic scholar Mawlana Abul Khair Patakoti and homemaker Begum Talimunnesa. Amin graduated from Al Jamia Al Islamia Patiya.

== Political life ==
Amin began his political career as a member of the Osmanpur Union Council after being elected in 1998. He later became its chairman after being elected in 2003, and served in this position up until 2011. In 2014, Amin was elected as chairman of Mirsarai Upazila Council as a Bangladesh Nationalist Party candidate. He was the chairman of the BNP's Osmanpur Union branch from 1999 to 2003. In 2008, Amin served as the joint convener of the BNP's Mirsarai Upazila branch. In the following year, he was appointed the secretary general of Mirsarai BNP and assistant secretary general of Northern Chittagong District BNP. He contested for Chittagong-1 constituency at the 2018 Bangladeshi general election, but lost to Awami League minister Engineer Mosharraf Hossain. In the same year, he served as joint convener for Northern Chittagong District BNP.

In the 2026 Bangladeshi general election, he received 128,799 votes, while his closest rival, Advocate Mohammad Saifur Rahman, received 84,538 votes. As a result, he won the Chittagong-1 seat in the 13th National Parliamentary election representing the Bangladesh Nationalist Party.

== Personal life ==
Amin is married to Begum Nurunnahar, with whom he has 4 sons and 3 daughters.

Amin has 31 cases against him and has been arrested five times.
