= Obaidul Huq Khandaker =

Bangladeshi politician

- ওবায়দুল হক খোন্দকার

Member of Parliament for Chittagong-1
- In office 1979–1982
- Preceded by: Mosharraf Hossain
- Succeeded by: Mosharraf Hossain
- In office 15 February 1996 – 12 June 1996
- Preceded by: Mohamad Ali Jinnah
- Succeeded by: Mosharraf Hossain

Personal details
- Born: 11 June 1926 Paschim Alinagar, Mirsharai thana, British India
- Died: March 22, 1999 (aged 72)
- Party: Bangladesh Nationalist Party

Obaidul Huq Khandaker was a Bangladesh Nationalist Party politician. He was elected a member of parliament from Chittagong-1 in 1979 and February 1996.

== Biography ==
Obaidul Huq Khandaker was born on 11 June 1926 in Paschim Alinagar village of what is now Mirsharai Upazila, Chittagong District, Bangladesh.

Obaidul Huq Khandaker was elected to parliament from Chittagong-1 as a Bangladesh Nationalist Party candidate in the 1979 Bangladeshi general election and the 15 February 1996 Bangladeshi general election.

He died on 22 March 1999.
