= Mosharraf Hossain (politician, born 1943) =

Bangladeshi politician (1943–2026)

- মোশাররফ হোসেন
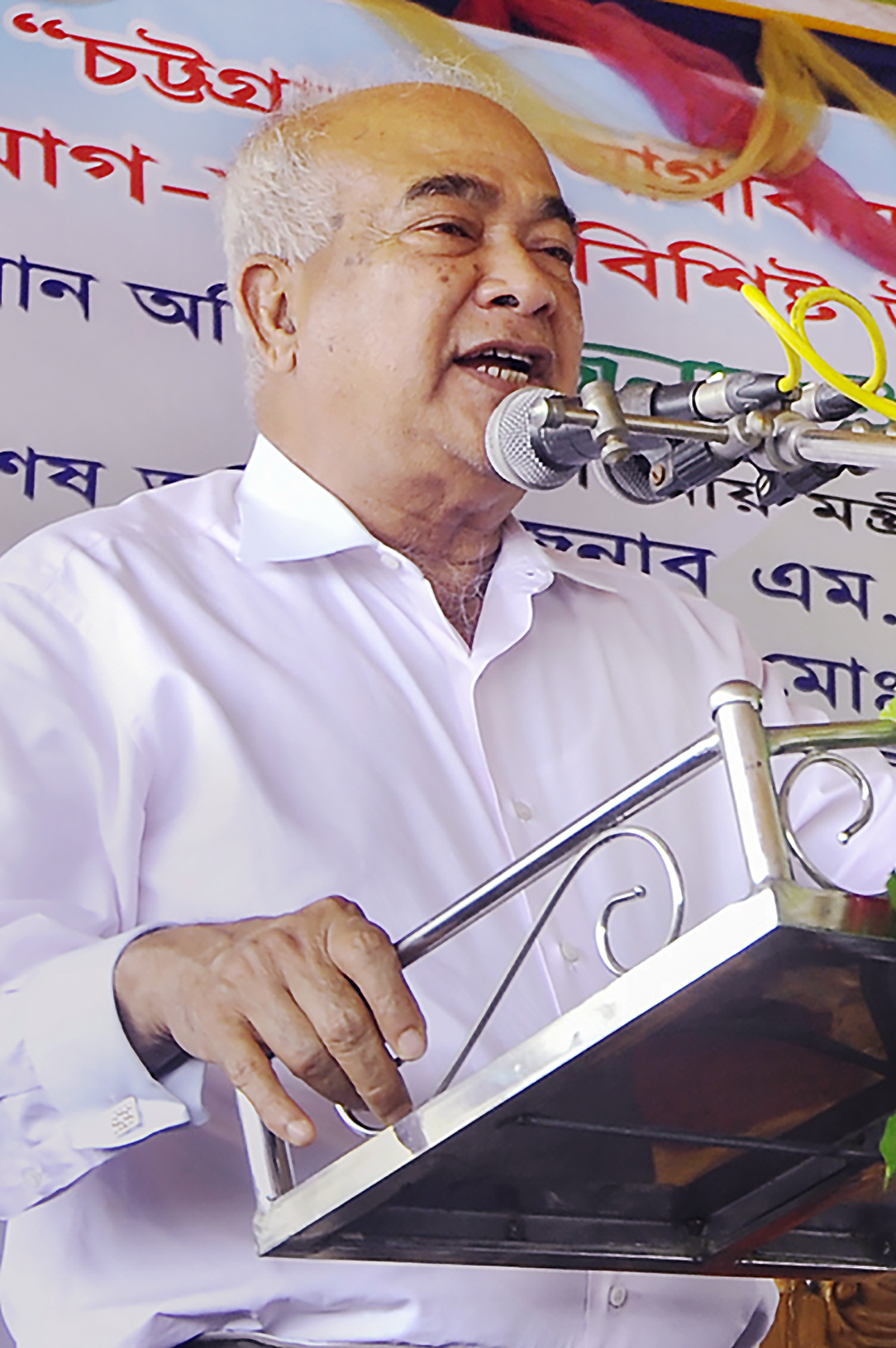
- Hossain in 2016

Minister of Housing and Public Works
- In office 12 January 2014 – 7 January 2019
- Prime Minister: Sheikh Hasina
- Preceded by: Mainul Hosein
- Succeeded by: SM Rezaul Karim
- In office 12 March 1999 – 15 July 2001
- Prime Minister: Sheikh Hasina
- Preceded by: Afsaruddin Ahmad
- Succeeded by: Abdul Muyeed Chowdhury

Minister of Civil Aviation and Tourism
- In office 31 December 1997 – 15 July 2001
- Prime Minister: Sheikh Hasina
- Preceded by: Sheikh Hasina
- Succeeded by: Syed Ishtiaq Ahmed

Member of Parliament for Chittagong-1
- In office 25 January 2009 – 2 November 2023
- Preceded by: Mohamad Ali Jinnah
- Succeeded by: Mahboob Rahman Ruhel
- In office September 1996 – 13 July 2001
- Preceded by: Obaidul Huq Khandaker
- Succeeded by: Mohamad Ali Jinnah
- In office 10 July 1986 – 6 December 1987
- Preceded by: Obaidul Huq Khandaker
- Succeeded by: Abu Salek
- In office 7 April 1973 – 6 November 1975
- Preceded by: Constituency created
- Succeeded by: Obaidul Huq Khandaker

Personal details
- Born: 12 January 1943 Chittagong, Bengal Province, British India
- Died: 13 May 2026 (aged 83) Dhaka, Bangladesh
- Party: Bangladesh Awami League
- Spouse: Ayesha Sultana
- Children: Mahboob Rahman Ruhel (son)
- Occupation: Politician, engineer

Mosharraf Hossain (known as Engineer Mosharraf Hossain; 12 January 1943 – 21 June 2026) was a Bangladeshi politician and industrialist. He was a member of the Bangladesh Parliament and the minister of the Ministry of Housing and Public Works from 2014 until 2016. After his graduation from University of Engineering and Technology, Lahore in 1966 he joined politics and was elected as a Member of the Provincial Assembly (MPA) of what was then East Pakistan in 1970. In the political arena, he is the presidium member (no. 1), the highest policy-making post of the Awami League, the oldest and traditional political organisation of the country. His constituency is Chittagong-1 (Mirsharai). He served the Ministry of Civil Aviation and Tourism in the Awami League government in 1996. He made significant contributions to the Bangladesh Liberation War in 1971. He served as the minister in charge of the Ministry of Housing and Public Works till 6 January 2019.

== Political career ==
Mosharraf Hossain began his political career as a member of the East Pakistan Provincial Council in 1970. He fought in the 1971 Bangladesh Liberation War. He was elected a member of parliament in 1973, 1986, 2008, 2014, and 2018.In August 2013, Hossain was included in the Awami League Central Working Committee.After the general election in 1996, Hossain was appointed the Minister of Civil Aviation and Tourism. In 2014, he was appointed the Minister of Public Works and Housing.

In January 2019, Hossain was among a number of senior Awami League leaders who were dropped from the new cabinet of ministers.After serving seven terms as a member of parliament from Chittagong-1, Mosharraf Hossain handed his nomination to his son, Mahboob Rahman (Ruhel), who was elected in the 12th national polls on 7 January 2024.

== Business career ==
Hossain was co-owner of Sayeman Beach Resort. His father Sayedur Rahman built the hotel in 1964. He converted it into a resort with 75 rooms as the new owner.

The Anti-Corruption Commission filed charges against Hossain in May 2007 over irregularities in the allocation of commercial land in Chittagong. On 26 January 2018, a court in Chittagong found him innocent of all charges.

== Personal life and death ==
Hossain was born in Chittagong, Bengal Province, British India on 12 January 1943. He was married to Ayesha Sultana.

Following the political transition and the fall of the Awami League administration, Hossain was arrested by law enforcement officers in the Basundhara Residential Area of Dhaka on 27 October 2024. He faced multiple charges and was held at the Chittagong Central Jail before falling ill. Due to deteriorating health, including diabetes and dementia, he was hospitalised and eventually secured bail for all cases on 14 August 2025.

While undergoing medical treatment at the Square Hospital, Hossain's condition deteriorated and he died at around 10:20 p.m. on 13 May 2026, at the age of 83.
