= Mahboob Rahman Ruhel =

Bangladeshi businessman and film producer

- মাহবুব রহমান রুহেল
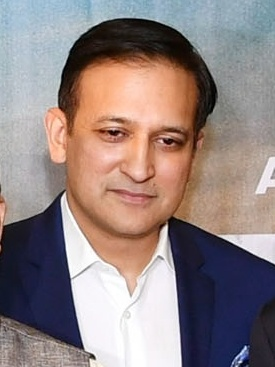
- Ruhel in 2019

Member of Parliament
- In office 30 January 2024 – 6 August 2024
- Preceded by: Mosharraf Hossain
- Succeeded by: Nurul Amin
- Constituency: Chittagong-1

Personal details
- Born: 8 July 1970 (age 56) Chittagong, East Pakistan, Pakistan
- Party: Bangladesh Awami League
- Spouse: Mirka Kristiina Rahman
- Children: Darius Rahman; Sulo Rahman
- Parents: Mosharraf Hossain (father); Ayesha Sultana (mother)
- Education: University of Texas at Arlington
- Occupation: Businessman; Politician; Film Producer

Mahboob Rahman Ruhel (born 8 July 1970) is a Bangladeshi politician, businessman and film producer. He is the Chairman of The Peninsula Chittagong Limited since 30 October 2014. He won the Bangladesh National Film Award for Best Film and Best Screenplay awards for the film No Dorai. He is the founder and Chairman of Show Motion Limited which owns the Star Cineplex movie theaters. Additionally, he is the managing director of Sayeman Beach Resort. Currently, Mahboob is also the Chairman of Board of iFarmer.asia.

== Background and education ==
Mahboob's father Mosharraf Hossain is an Awami League politician, having previously served as Jatiya Sangsad member from the Chittagong-1 constituency and a former minister of the government of Bangladesh. Mahboob earned his bachelor's degree in information systems and computer science from the University of Texas at Arlington. In 1995, he studied Business Administration at The University of Dallas. He completed EMBA in 2009 from Aalto University Executive Education.

== Political career ==
Mahboob Rahman entered the local politics of Mirsharai in 2024 as the candidate of the Bangladesh Awami League. Mahboob has won the election his debut election in Chittagong-1 (Mirsharai, Constituency Number: 278) seat. He got 89,064 votes, while his closest rival candidate Md Giyas Uddin got 52,995 votes.

After 5 August, the non-cooperation movement in 2024, Mahboob Rahman lost his position as a Member of Parliament when President Mohammad Shahabuddin dissolved the 12th National Parliament.
