= Osmanpur Union, Mirsarai =

Union of Mirsharai Upazila, Chittagong District, Bangladesh

Osmanpur Union
- Union
- Location in Bangladesh
- Coordinates: 23.7814°N 89.2620°E
- Country: Chittagong Bangladesh
- Division: Chittagong Division
- District: Chittagong District
- Upazilas: Mirsharai Upazila

Area
  - Total: 13.5 km^{2} (5.2 sq mi)

Population (2001)
  - Total: 13,443
- Time zone: UTC+6 (BST)

Osmanpur Union is a union, the smallest administrative body of Bangladesh, located in Mirsharai Upazila, Chittagong District, Bangladesh. The total population is 13,443.

== Notable people ==
- Nurul Amin, politician from Patakot
