= Cox's Bazar Beach =

Beach in Cox's Bazar, Bangladesh

Cox's Bazar
- Beach
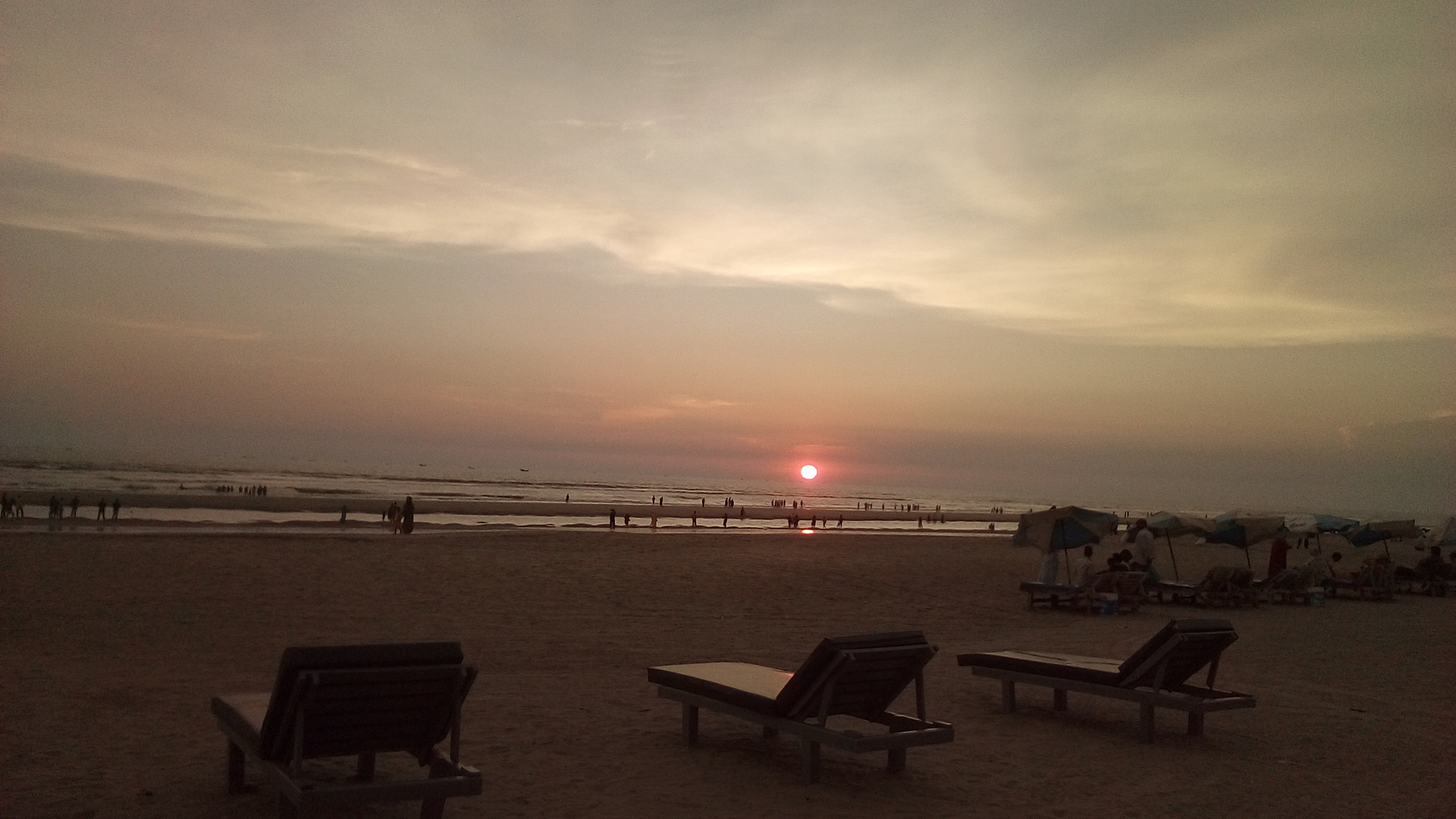
- Sunset from the beach

- Location within Chittagong division Location within Bangladesh
- Coordinates: 21.4143°N 91.9832°E
- Location: Cox's Bazar, Bangladesh
- Water bodies: Bay of Bengal

Dimensions
  - Length: 120 km (75 mi)

Cox's Bazar Beach (Bengali: কক্সবাজার সমুদ্র সৈকত), located at Cox's Bazar, Bangladesh, is the longest natural sea beach in Asia running 120 kilometres (75 mi) and 3rd longest beach after Praia do Cassino of Brazil and Padre Island on the US Gulf Coast. It is the top tourist destination of Bangladesh.

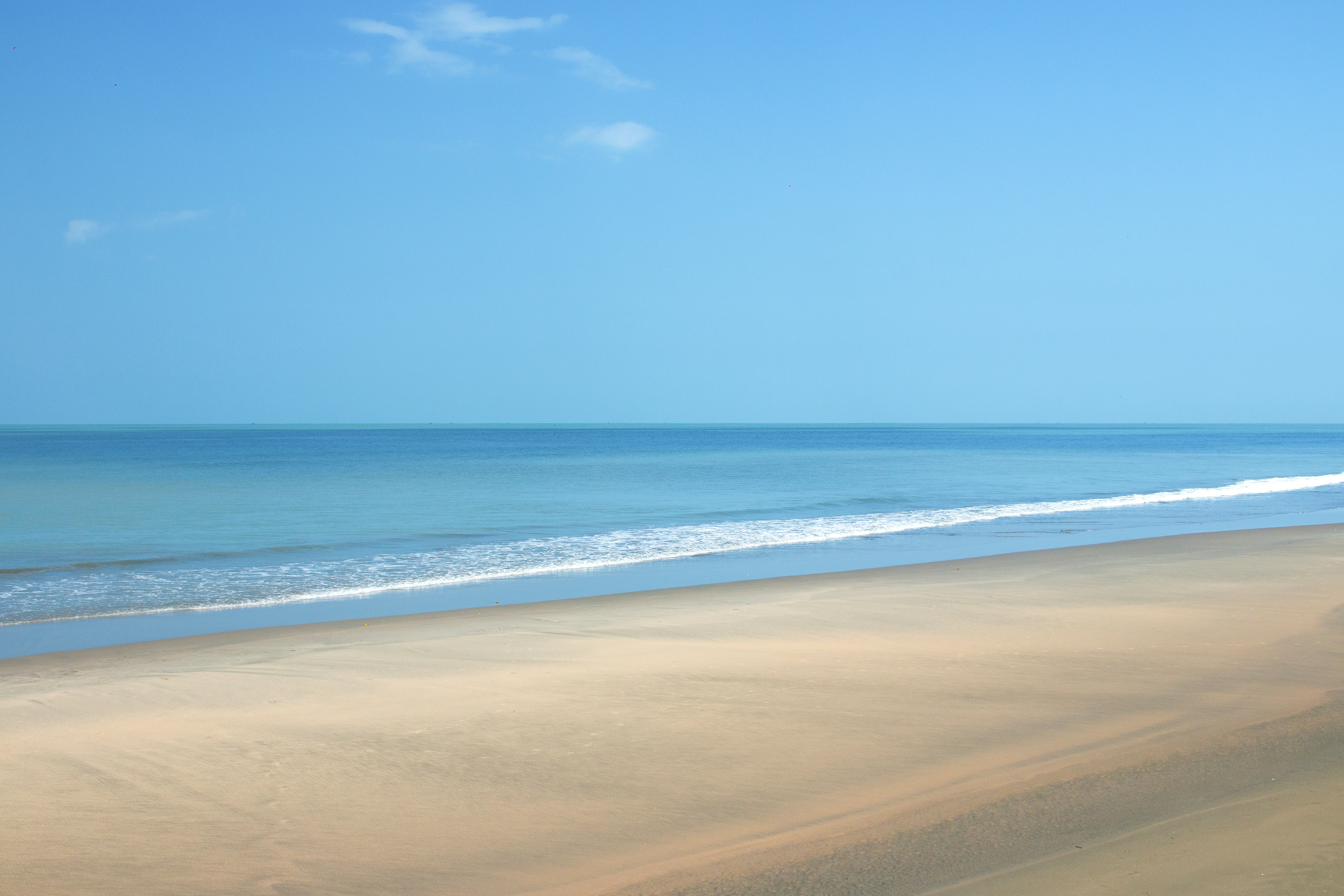
Bay of Bengal from Cox's Bazar Beach

== Geography ==
At high tide, the beach is 200 metres (660 ft) wide, and at low tide, it is 400 metres (1,300 ft) wide on average. Quicksand is a danger during ebb tide.

== History ==
From the early 9th century, the greater Chittagong area including Cox's Bazar was under the rule of Arakan kings until its conquest by the Mughals in 1666 AD. When the Mughal Prince Shah Shuja was passing through the hilly terrain of the present-day Cox's Bazar on his way to Arakan, he was attracted to its scenic and captivating beauty. He commanded his forces to camp there. His retinue of one thousand palanquins stopped there for some time. A place named Dulahazara, meaning "one thousand palanquins," still exists in the area.

After the Mughals, the place came under the control of the Tipras and the Arakanese, followed by the Portuguese and then the British.

The name Cox's Bazar originated from the name of a British East India Company officer, Captain Hiram Cox, who was appointed as the superintendent of Palonki (today's Cox's Bazar) outpost. He succeeded Warren Hastings, who became the Governor of Bengal following the British East India Company Act in 1773. Cox embarked upon the task of rehabilitation and settlement of the Arakanese refugees in the area. He rehabilitated many refugees in the area, but died in 1799 before finishing his work. To commemorate him, a market was established and named after him, called Cox's Bazar. Cox's Bazar was first established in 1854 and became a municipality in 1869.

Just after the end of British rule in 1947, Cox's Bazar became part of East Pakistan. Captain Advocate Fazlul Karim, the first post-independence chairman of Cox's Bazar Municipality, established the Tamarisk Forest along the beach. He wanted to attract tourists as well as to protect the beach from tsunamis. He donated much of his father-in-law's and his own lands as sites for constructing a public library and a town hall. Karim was inspired to build Cox's Bazar as a tourist spot after seeing beaches of Mumbai and Karachi, and was a resort pioneer in developing Cox's Bazar as a tourist destination. Karim established a maternity hospital, a stadium and a sewer system by procuring grants from the Ford Foundation and Rockefeller Foundation through correspondence. T. H. Matthews, the principal of the Dhaka Engineering College, was a friend who had helped him in these fundraising efforts. Engineer Chandi Charan Das was the government civil engineer who worked on all these projects.

== Parts of the beach ==
=== Kolatoli Point ===
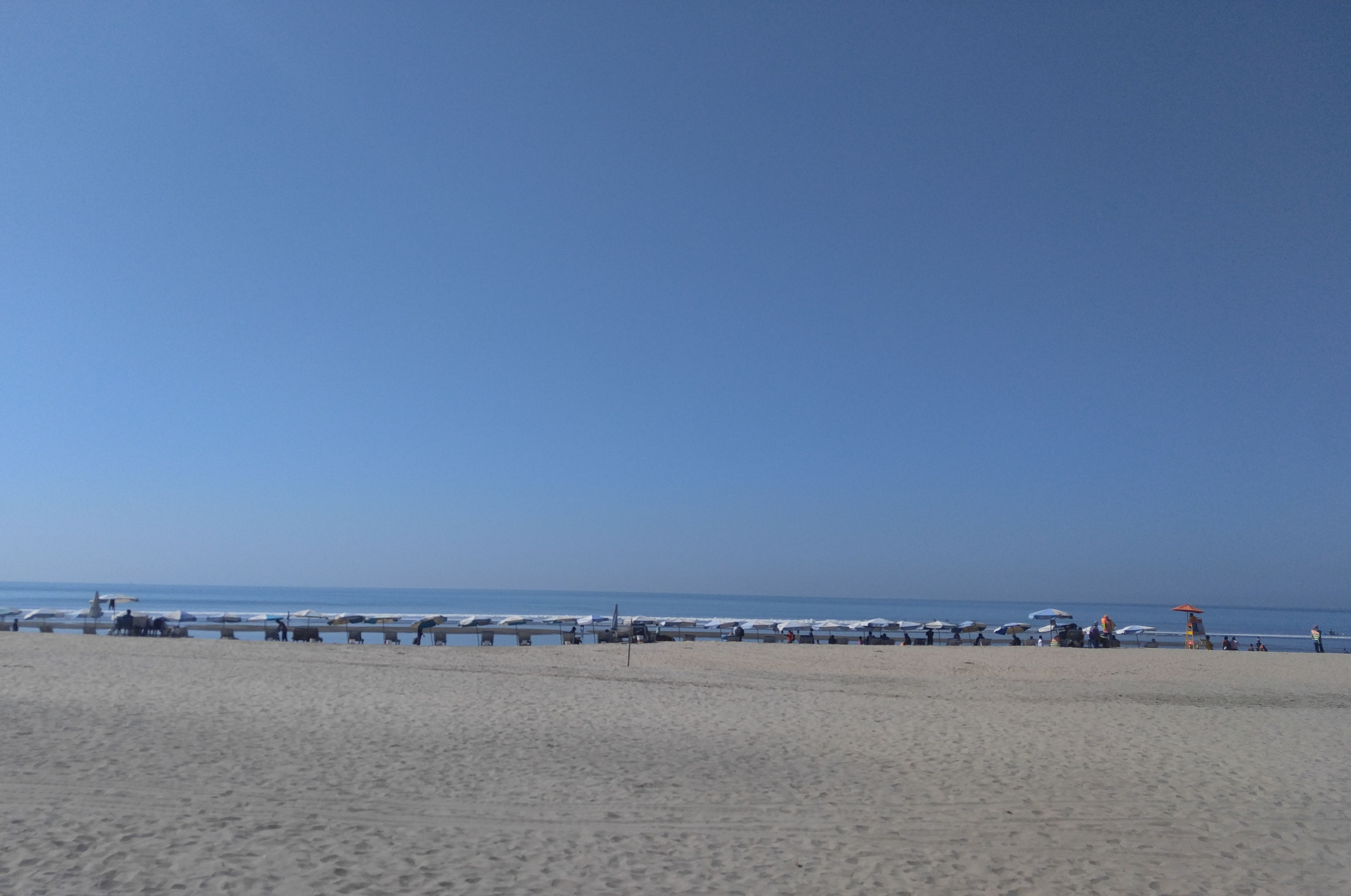
Kolatoli Point during the day

Kolatoli Point (Bengali: কলাতলী পয়েন্ট) is an important part of Cox's Bazar beach situated near Dolphine Intersection of the city of Cox's Bazar. Many hotels and restaurants reside in this area. Buses stop near this point. Before government restrictions, bus stations were in the beach area of Kolatoli. Now all buses stop near Dolphine Moor. Sayeman Beach Resort is located on the shores of this stretch of beach.

=== Sugandha Point ===
Beach at Sugandha Point

Sugandha Point (Bengali: সুগন্ধা পয়েন্ট) is situated from the north of Kolatoli point. There is a Burmese Market that is famous in Cox's Bazar. There were sea food restaurants but they were later demolished by the government. It also has a Fly Dining restaurant.

=== Laboni Point ===
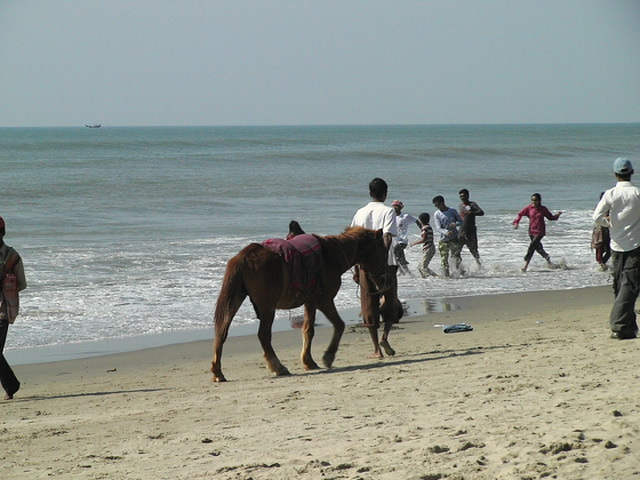
Horseback riding at Laboni Point

Laboni Point (Bengali: লাবনী পয়েন্ট) is another famous part of the beach. People mainly gather mostly here. This part is best for horseback riding, speed-boat riding, etc.

=== Darianagar Beach ===
Darianagar (Bengali: দরিয়ানগর সৈকত) is situated near Himchhori waterfall and hill track. It is a beach with waterways flowing through it. Darianagar is well known for parasailing too.

=== Inani Beach ===
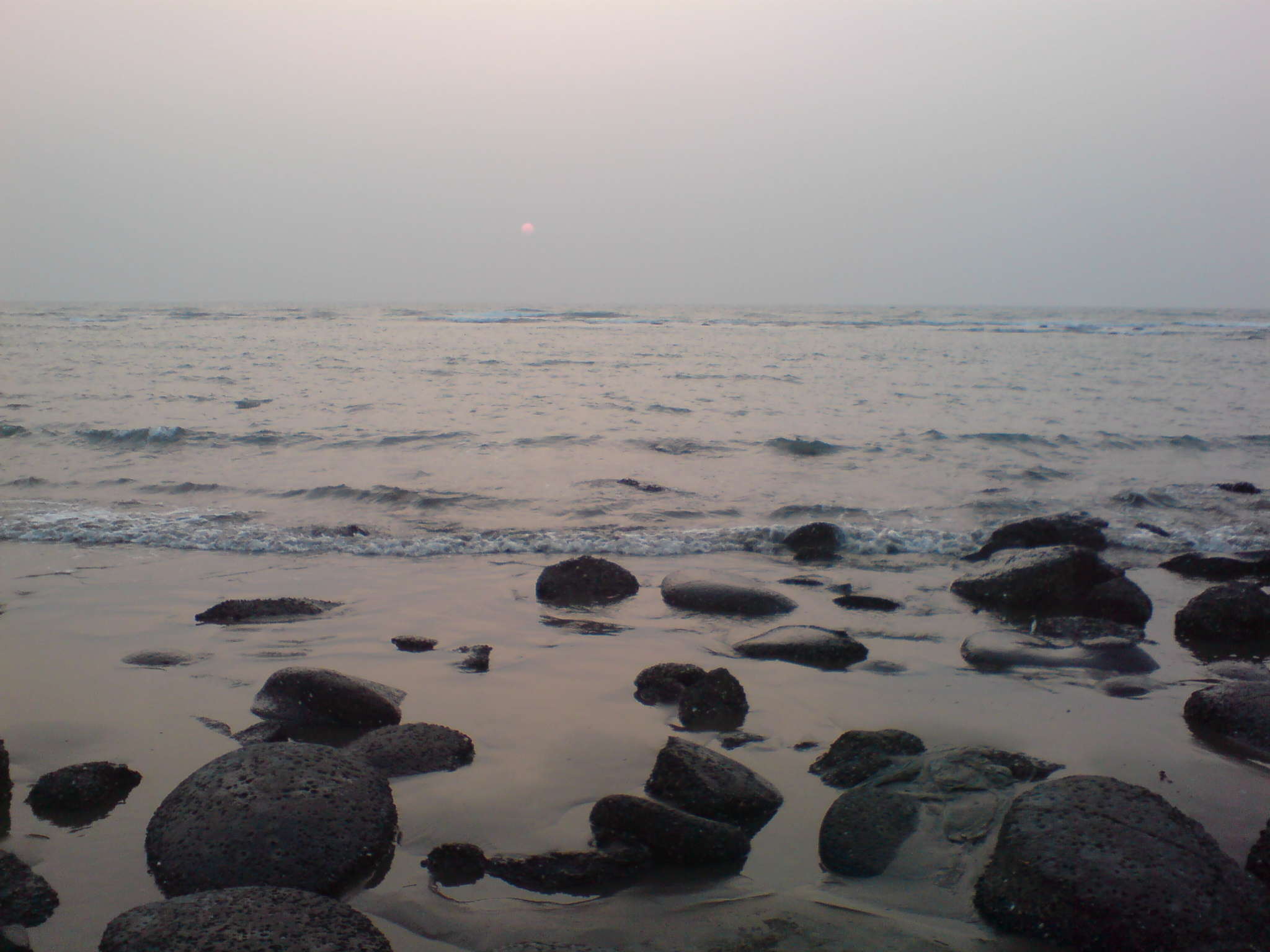
Inani Beach

Inani Beach (Bengali: ইনানী সৈকত) is an 18-kilometre-long (11 mi) sea beach in Ukhia Upazila of Cox's Bazar District, Bangladesh. It has a lot of coral stones, which are very sharp. These coral stones look black and green, and they are found in summer or rainy seasons. Patuartek Beach is situated nearby.

=== Teknaf Section ===
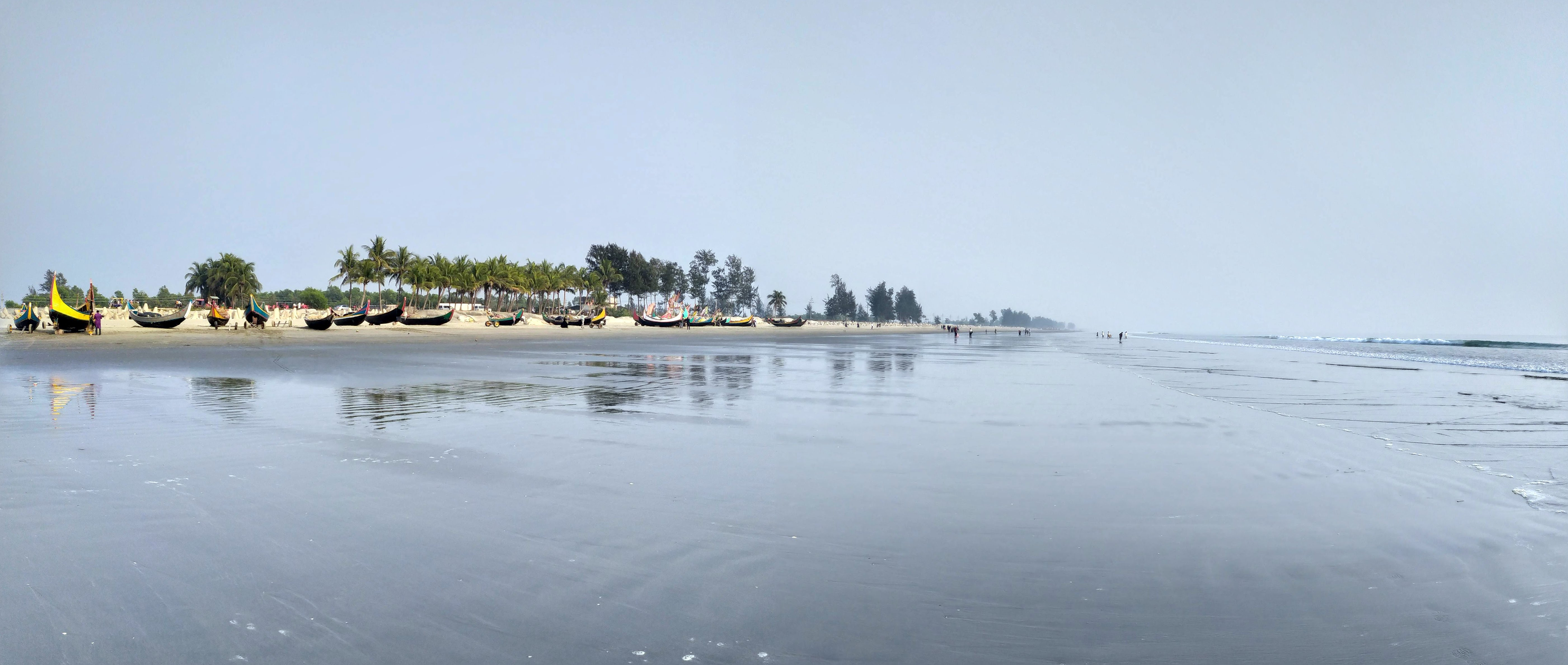
Teknaf Sea Beach

Teknaf Beach (Bengali: টেকনাফ সৈকত) is situated in Teknaf Upazila of Cox's Bazar district. This is unlike the main part of the beach. Teknaf Beach has more wildlife than the main beach and surrounded by Teknaf Peninsula's mangroves. This section is divided by many beaches. Other beaches of the section are:

- Shamlapur Beach (Baharchara Beach)
- Shilakhali Beach
- Hajampara Beach
- Shapuree Island Beach

== Tourism ==
According to a survey of Bangladesh Bureau of Statistics in December 2021, each year roughly 3 million tourists visit Cox's Bazar. However, the number of trips to Cox's Bazar beach is declining due to various issues.

== Controversy ==
In 2021, an area of Cox's Bazar beach was declared a women-only zone, but the government reversed the decision after controversy.

== Gallery ==
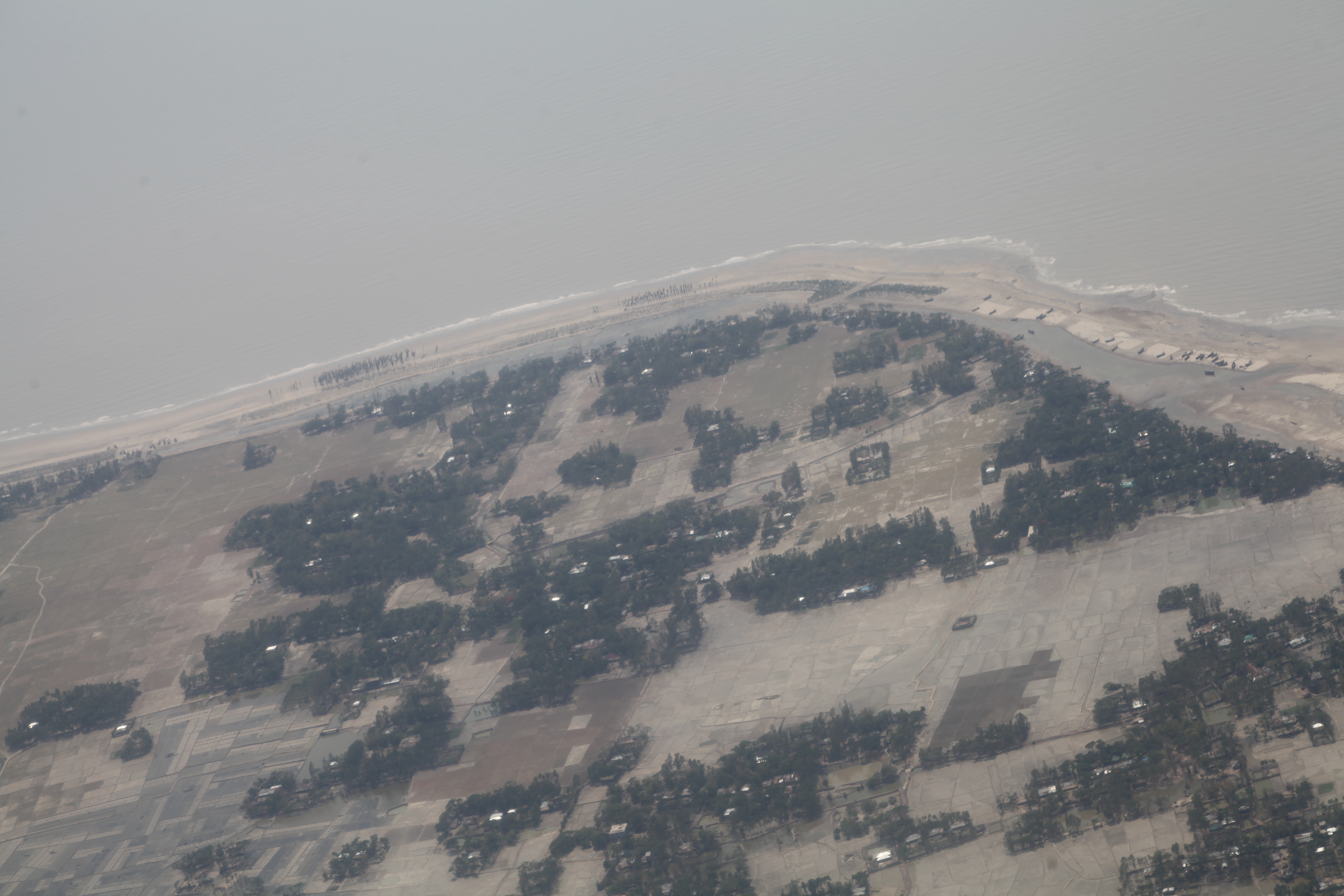
Aerial view of Cox's Bazar Beach

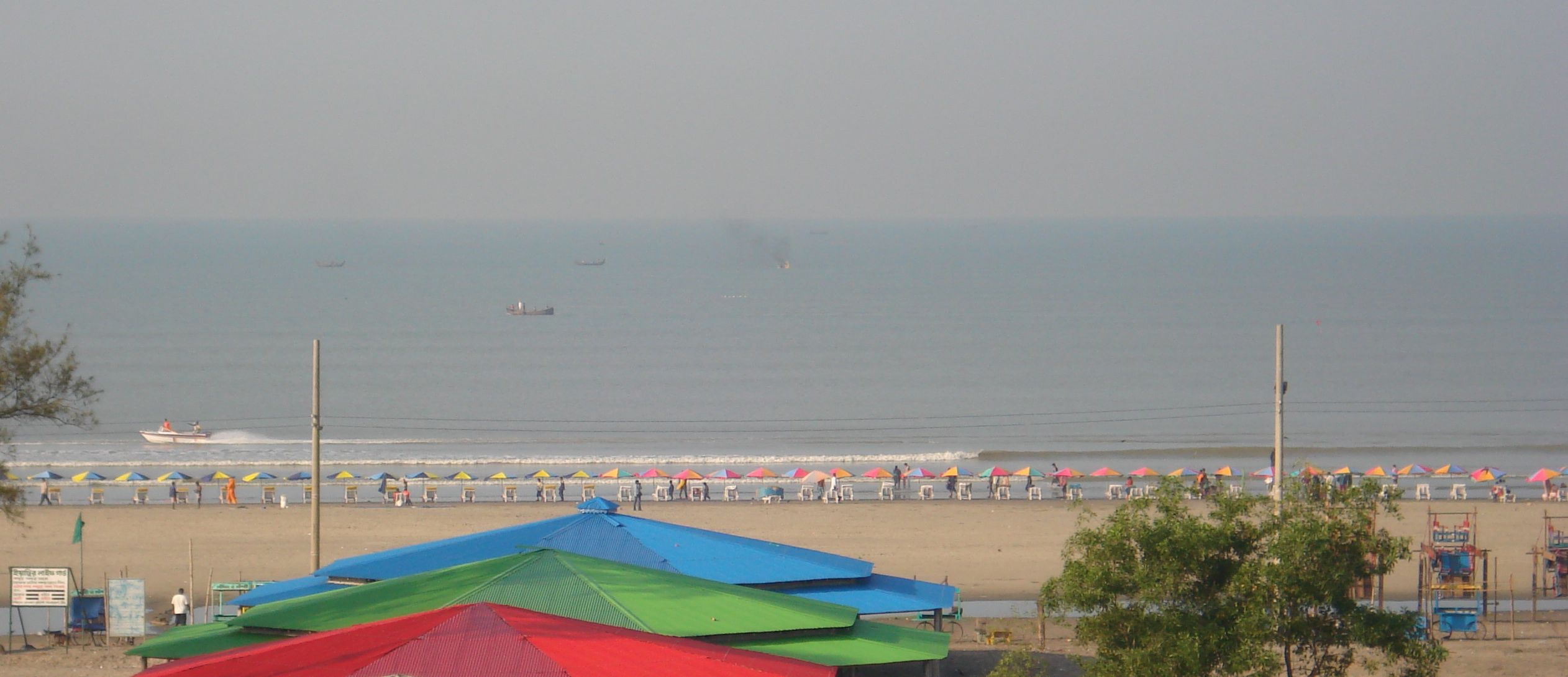
Panoramic view of Cox's Bazar sea beach

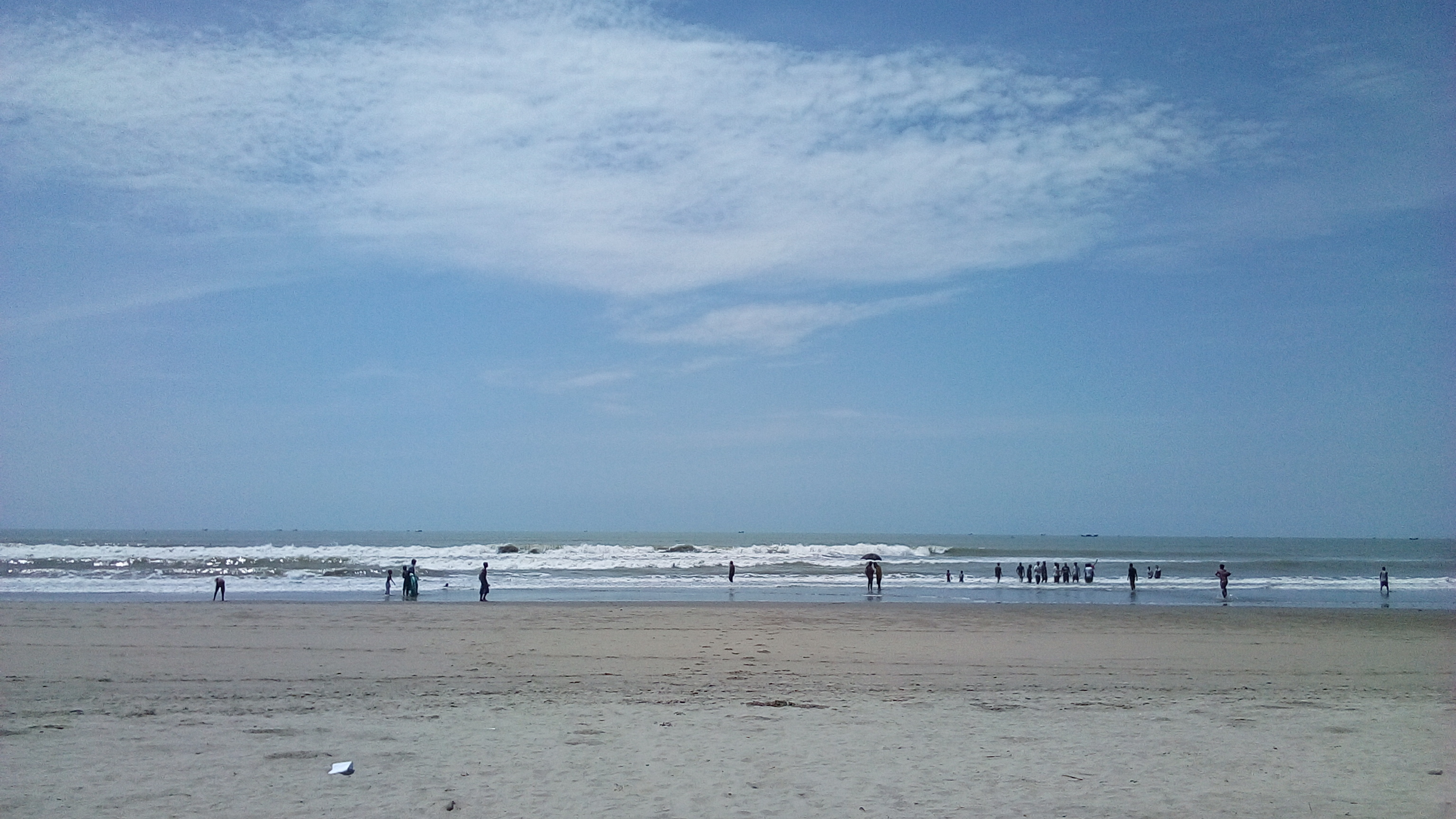
Cox's Bazar in daylight

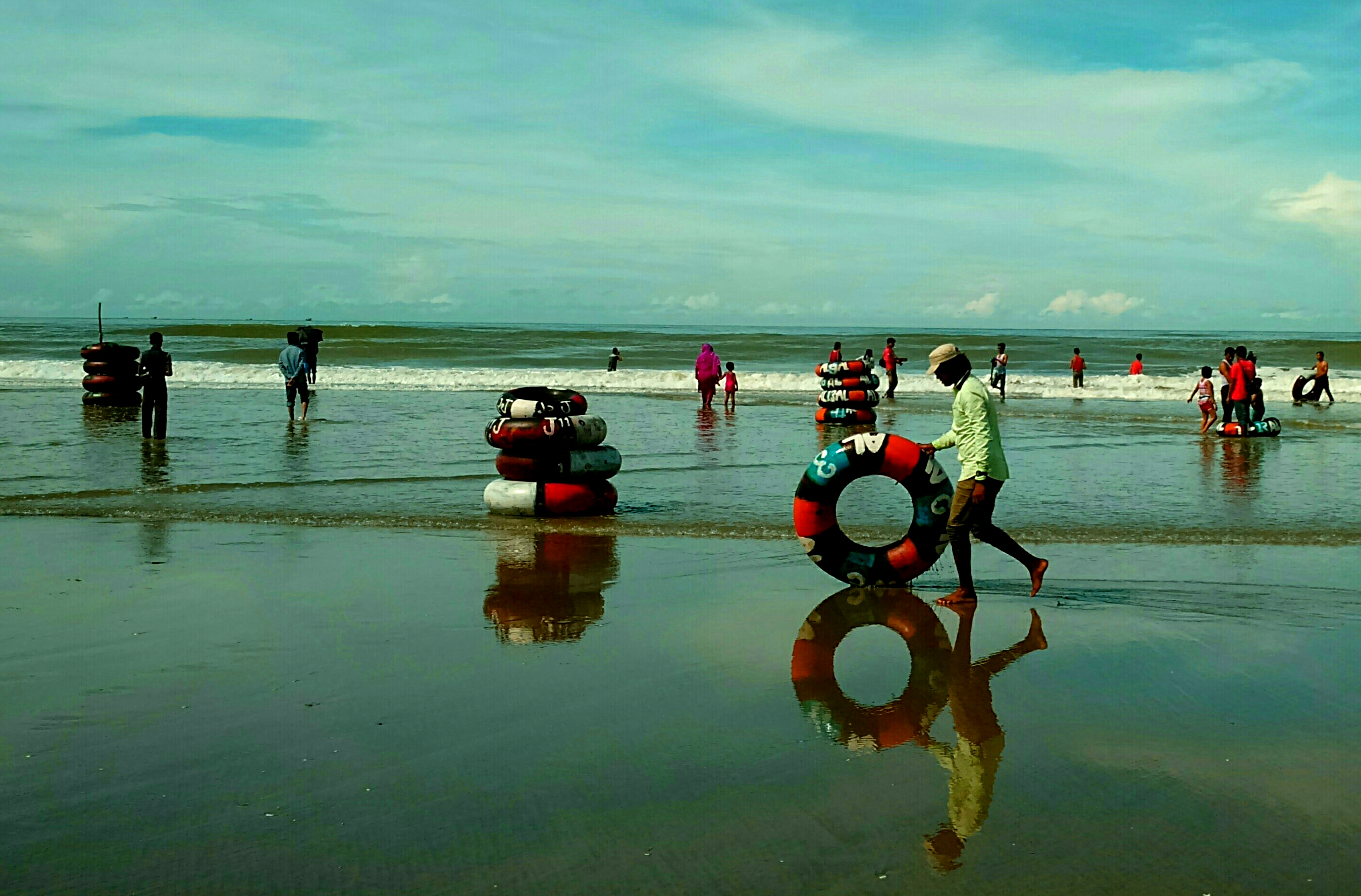
People at Cox's Bazar

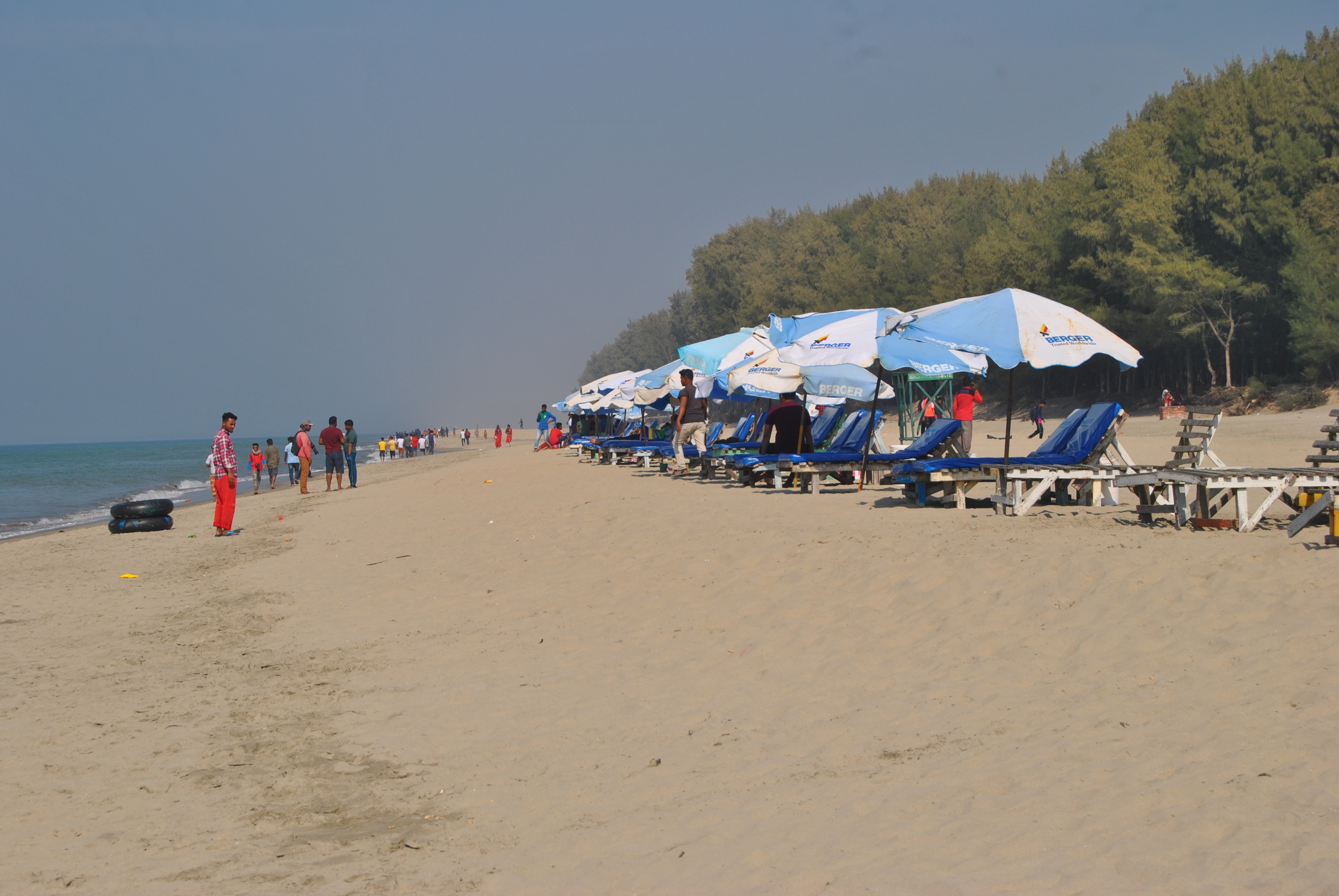
Sea Beach Area

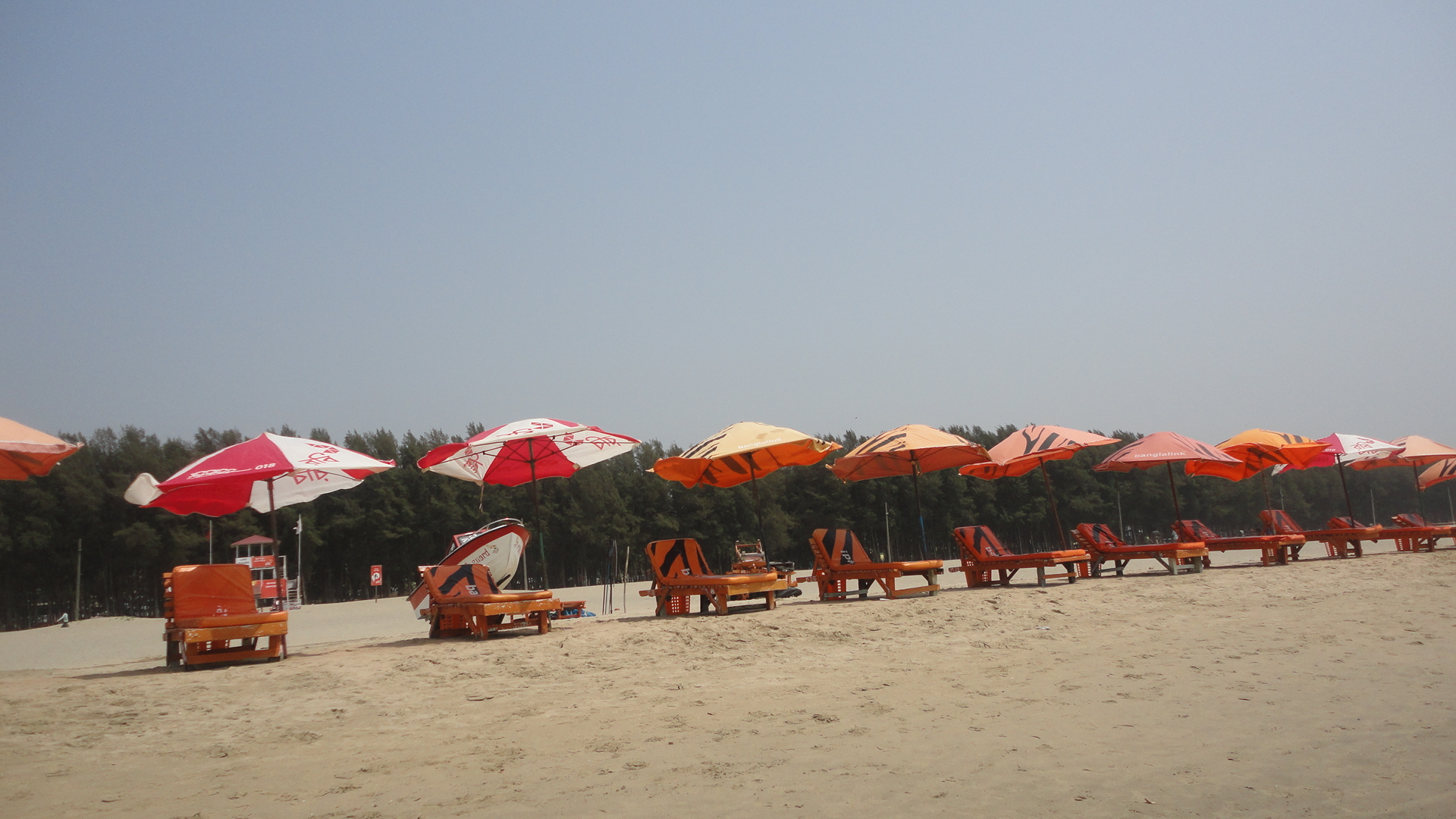
Cox's Bazar Beach

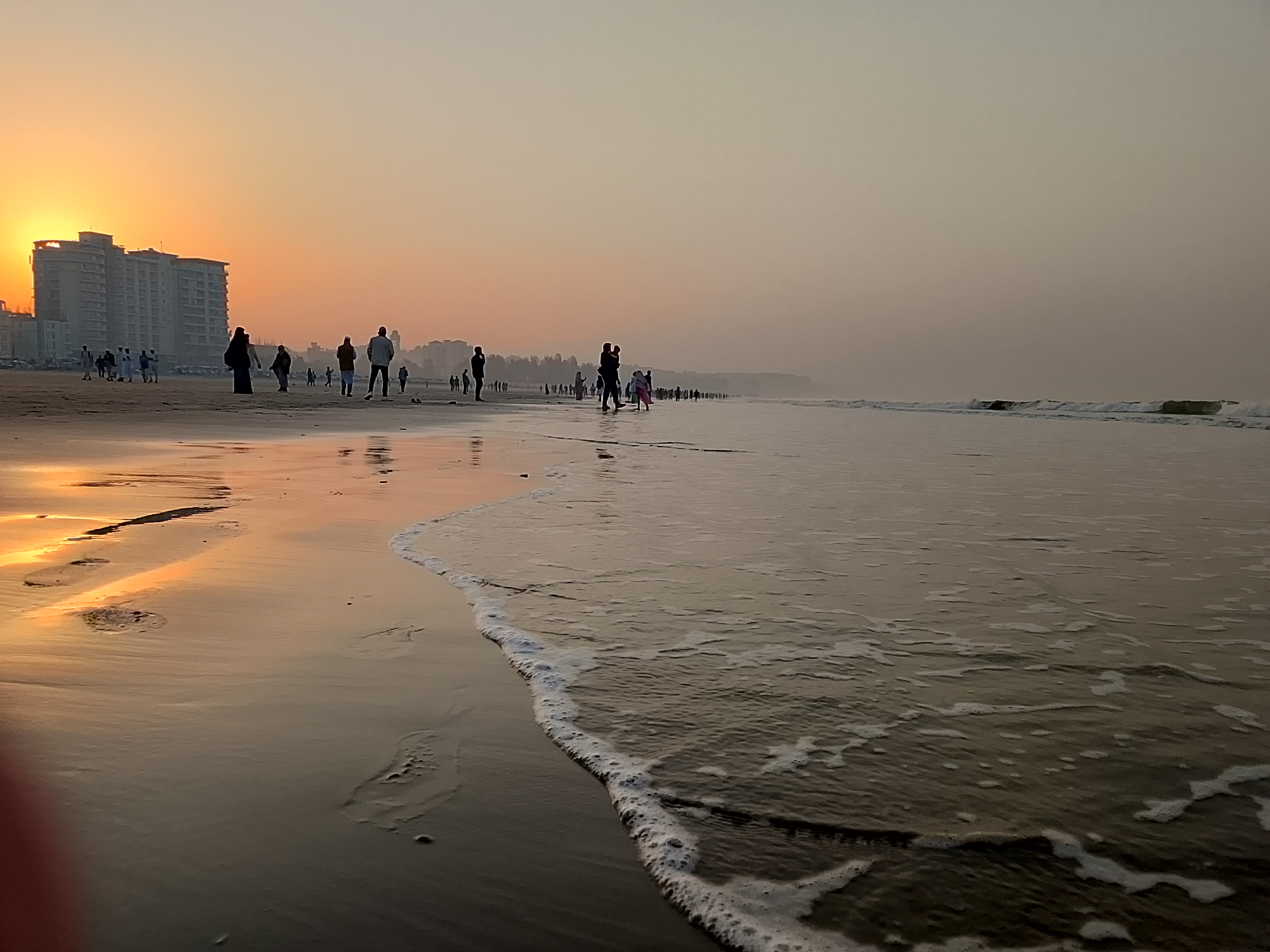
Cox's Bazar Sea Beach

== See also ==
- Cox's Bazar–Teknaf Marine Drive
- St. Martin's Island
- List of beaches in Bangladesh
- Tourism in Bangladesh
