= Cox's Bazar International University =

Private university in Cox's Bazar, Bangladesh

- কক্সবাজার আন্তর্জাতিক বিশ্ববিদ্যালয়
- Other names: CBIU
- Type: Private
- Established: 2013; 13 years ago
- Affiliations: University Grants Commission (UGC)
- Chancellor: President Mohammed Shahabuddin
- Vice-Chancellor: Golam Kibrea Bhuiyan
- Location: Cox's Bazar, 4700, Bangladesh; 21.4159°N 91.9844°E
- Campus: Urban,
- Language: English
- Website: cbiu.ac.bd

Cox's Bazar International University is a private university located in Kolatoli Square, Cox's Bazar city. It is the private university in Cox's Bazar District.

== History ==
Former Prime Minister Sheikh Hasina announced in Ukhia on 3 September 2013 that a private university would be built in Cox's Bazar. The university was founded by businessman Lion Md. Mujibur Rahman.

For a number of years, the university operated without an approved vice-chancellor. As of 2022, the university had no professors.

== Campus ==
Its campus is located near Kolatoli Intersection, Cox's Bazar city.

== Vice chancellors ==
- Golam Kibrea Bhuiyan (December 2020 - present)

== See also ==
- List of universities in Bangladesh
- Cox's Bazar District
