= Chittagong-1 =

Constituency of Bangladesh's Jatiya Sangsad

Coordinates: 22.78°N 91.57°E

- Constituency for the Jatiya Sangsad
- District: Chittagong District
- Division: Chittagong Division
- Electorate: 386,674 (2026)

Current constituency
- Created: 1973
- Party: Bangladesh Nationalist Party
- Member: Nurul Amin
- ← 277 Lakshmipur-4 279 Chittagong-2 →

Chittagong-1 is a constituency represented in the Jatiya Sangsad (National Parliament) of Bangladesh since 2026 by Nurul Amin of the Bangladesh Nationalist Party.

== Boundaries ==
The constituency encompasses Mirsharai Upazila.

== History ==
The constituency was created for the first general elections in newly independent Bangladesh, held in 1973.

== Members of Parliament ==
Election	Member	Party
1973	Mosharraf Hossain	Awami League
1979	Obaidul Huq Khandaker	Bangladesh Nationalist Party
1986	Mosharraf Hossain	Awami League
1988	Abu Salek	Jatiya Party
1991	Mohamad Ali Jinnah	Bangladesh Nationalist Party
Feb 1996	Obaidul Huq Khandaker	Bangladesh Nationalist Party
Sep 1996 by-election	Mosharraf Hossain	Awami League
2001	Mohamad Ali Jinnah	Bangladesh Nationalist Party
2008	Mosharraf Hossain	Awami League
2014	Mosharraf Hossain	Awami League
2018	Mosharraf Hossain	Awami League
2024	Mahboob Rahman Ruhel	Awami League
2026	Nurul Amin	Bangladesh Nationalist Party

== Elections ==
=== Elections in the 2020s ===
General Election 2026: Chittagong-1
Party	Candidate	Votes	%	±%
BNP	Nurul Amin	128,799	59.0	N/A
Jamaat	Saifur Rahman	84,538	38.7	N/A
IAB	Ferdous Ahmed Chowdhury	2,108	1.0	N/A
JP(E)	Syed Shahadat Hossain	1,659	0.8	N/A
IBB	Rezaul Karim	780	0.4	N/A
BML	Sheikh Zulfikar Bulbul Chowdhury	269	0.1	N/A
JSD (Rab)	A. K. M. Abu Yusuf	258	0.1	N/A
Majority		44,261	20.3	N/A
Turnout		218,411	56.5	N/A
Registered electors		386,674		
BNP gain from AL				

=== Elections in the 2010s ===
Mosharraf Hossain was re-elected unopposed in the 2014 general election after opposition parties withdrew their candidacies in a boycott of the election.

=== Elections in the 2000s ===
General Election 2008: Chittagong-1
Party	Candidate	Votes	%	±%
AL	Mosharraf Hossain	105,339	52.4	+4.4
BNP	ADM Kamal Uddin Chowdhury	94,665	47.1	−3.6
Independent	Abu Salek	441	0.2	0.0
BKP	Md. Yousuf	399	0.2	N/A
BSD	Safiul Alam	250	0.1	N/A
Majority		10,674	5.3	+2.7
Turnout		201,094	85.5	+9.3
AL gain from BNP				

General Election 2001: Chittagong-1
Party	Candidate	Votes	%	±%
BNP	Mohamad Ali Jinnah	86,839	50.7	+24.7
AL	Mosharraf Hossain	82,333	48.0	−24.9
IJOF	Ali Ashraf Chowdhury	921	0.5	N/A
CPB (M-L)	Dilip Barua	307	0.2	N/A
Independent	Abu Salek	294	0.2	N/A
Muslim League	M. A. Aziz	226	0.1	N/A
Bangladesh Progressive Party	Md. Kefayet Hossain	138	0.1	N/A
Independent	Nur Uddin Ahmed	111	0.1	−0.2
Jatiya Party (M)	Ibrahim Iqbal	62	0.0	N/A
Independent	Md. Nurul Absar	51	0.0	N/A
Independent	Abu Ahmad Jahirul Amin Khan	45	0.0	N/A
Independent	Md. Nurul Abser Chowdhury	24	0.0	N/A
Majority		4,506	2.6	−44.3
Turnout		171,351	76.2	+9.8
BNP gain from AL				

=== Elections in the 1990s ===
Khaleda Zia stood for five seats in the June 1996 general election: Bogra-6, Bogra-7, Feni-1, Lakshmipur-2 and Chittagong-1. After winning all five, she chose to represent Feni-1 and quit the other four, triggering by-elections in them. Mosharraf Hossain was elected in a September 1996 by-election.

Chittagong-1 by-election, 1996
Party	Candidate	Votes	%	±%
AL	Mosharraf Hossain	83,600	72.9	+27.8
BNP	Mohamad Ali Jinnah	29,786	26.0	−22.2
JP(E)	Ali Ashraf Chowdhury	895	0.8	−0.9
Independent	Nur Uddin Ahmed	306	0.3	N/A
Independent	Md. Jaffar Uddin Ahmed	153	0.1	N/A
Majority		53,814	46.9	+43.8
Turnout		114,740	66.4	−12.1
AL gain from BNP				

General Election June 1996: Chittagong-1
Party	Candidate	Votes	%	±%
BNP	Khaleda Zia	66,336	48.2	−4.2
AL	Mosharraf Hossain	62,043	45.1	+7.5
Jamaat	Md. Badrul Alam	6,102	4.4	−3.9
JP(E)	Ali Asfraf Chowdhury	2,382	1.7	N/A
CPB (M-L)	Dilip Barua	511	0.4	−0.8
Bangladesh Muslim League (Jamir Ali)	M. A. Aziz	199	0.1	N/A
Zaker Party	Mohammad Nurul Gani	129	0.1	0.0
Majority		4,293	3.1	−11.7
Turnout		137,702	78.5	+18.5
BNP hold				

General Election 1991: Chittagong-1
Party	Candidate	Votes	%	±%
BNP	Mohamad Ali Jinnah	66,969	52.4	
AL	Mosharraf Hossain	48,030	37.6	
Jamaat	Shamsuddin	10,605	8.3	
CPB (M-L)	Dilip Barua	1,552	1.2	
Independent	Ridwanul Bari	228	0.2	
Zaker Party	Mirza Md. Nurul Haq	183	0.1	
Jatiya Samajtantrik Dal-JSD	Abdul Manan	161	0.1	
Bangladesh Muslim League (Kader)	Sk. Zulfiqar Bulbul Chowdhury	82	0.1	
Majority		18,939	14.8	
Turnout		127,810	60.0	
BNP gain from				
