= N110 (Bangladesh) =

Highway in Bangladesh

N110
- Cox's Bazar link road–Laboni moure highway

Route information
- Part of AH41
- Maintained by Bangladesh Road Transport Authority
- Length: 10.968 km (6.815 mi)

Major junctions
- North end: Link road bus stop, Cox's Bazar District
- West end: Jhinuk market, Laboni point, Cox's Bazar

Location
- Country: Bangladesh
- Major cities: Cox's Bazar

Highway system
- Roads in Bangladesh
| ← N1 | → R180 |

Cox's Bazar link road–Laboni moure highway is a 10.968 km (6.815 mi) national highway located in the district of Cox's Bazar, Chittagong Division, Bangladesh.

== Background ==
The starting point of this road is the Link Road, from where this road runs to the west and the Cox's Bazar–Teknaf road to the south-east. This highway is the busiest road in Cox's Bazar which starts from Link Road and extends through Kolatoli, the main suburb of the city, to Jhinuk market of Laboni Point. This road with a length of 10.968 km has two lane which is 7.30 meters wide. This highway is part of the proposed Mirsarai–Teknaf Marine Drive.

== Expansion ==
In 2018, a proposal was sent to the Planning Commission to upgrade the highway to four lanes. After several meetings on the project that year, it was finalized. On 19 February 2019, Obaidul Quader, the minister of road transport and bridges, announced that the tender for the project would soon be called. Sheikh Hasina, prime minister of the country, inaugurated the expansion project on 7 December 2022.

== Route ==
1. Link road
2. Bus terminal (Larpara)
3. Police lines
4. Dolphin moure (Kolatoli)
5. Laboni intersection
6. Jhinuk market
