= Abu Salek =

Bangladeshi politician

Member of Bangladesh Parliament
- In office 1988–1990

Personal details
- Party: Jatiya Party (Ershad)

Abu Salek (Bengali: আবু সালেক) is a Jatiya Party (Ershad) politician in Bangladesh and a former member of parliament for Chittagong-1.

== Career ==
Salek was elected to parliament from Chittagong-1 as a Jatiya Party candidate in 1988.
