= Mohamad Ali Jinnah (Chittagong politician) =

Bangladeshi politician

Member of Parliament
- In office 2001–2006
- Preceded by: Mosharraf Hossain
- Succeeded by: Mosharraf Hossain
- Constituency: Chittagong-1

Personal details
- Party: Bangladesh Nationalist Party

Mohamad Ali Jinnah is a Bangladesh Nationalist Party politician and a former member of parliament for Chittagong-1.

== Career ==
In the 5th National Parliamentary Election held in 1991, Mohammad Ali Jinnah won the Chittagong-1 seat by securing 66,969 votes under the BNP banner, defeating his closest competitor, Engineer Mosharraf Hossain of the Awami League, who received 48,030 votes.

Prior to the 1996 election, internal disputes over the party nomination for Chittagong-1 broke out within the local BNP unit. To resolve this conflict, BNP Chairperson Begum Khaleda Zia personally contested the seat herself and won. Jinnah later ran in the by-election but lost to Mosharraf Hossain.

He successfully reclaimed the Chittagong-1 seat as a Bangladesh Nationalist Party candidate in the 2001 election. He later left the party and joined the Liberal Democratic Party in 2006.
