= Cox's Bazar bus terminal =

Bus terminal in Bangladesh

Cox's Bazar Central bus terminal কক্সবাজার কেন্দ্রীয় বাস টার্মিনাল
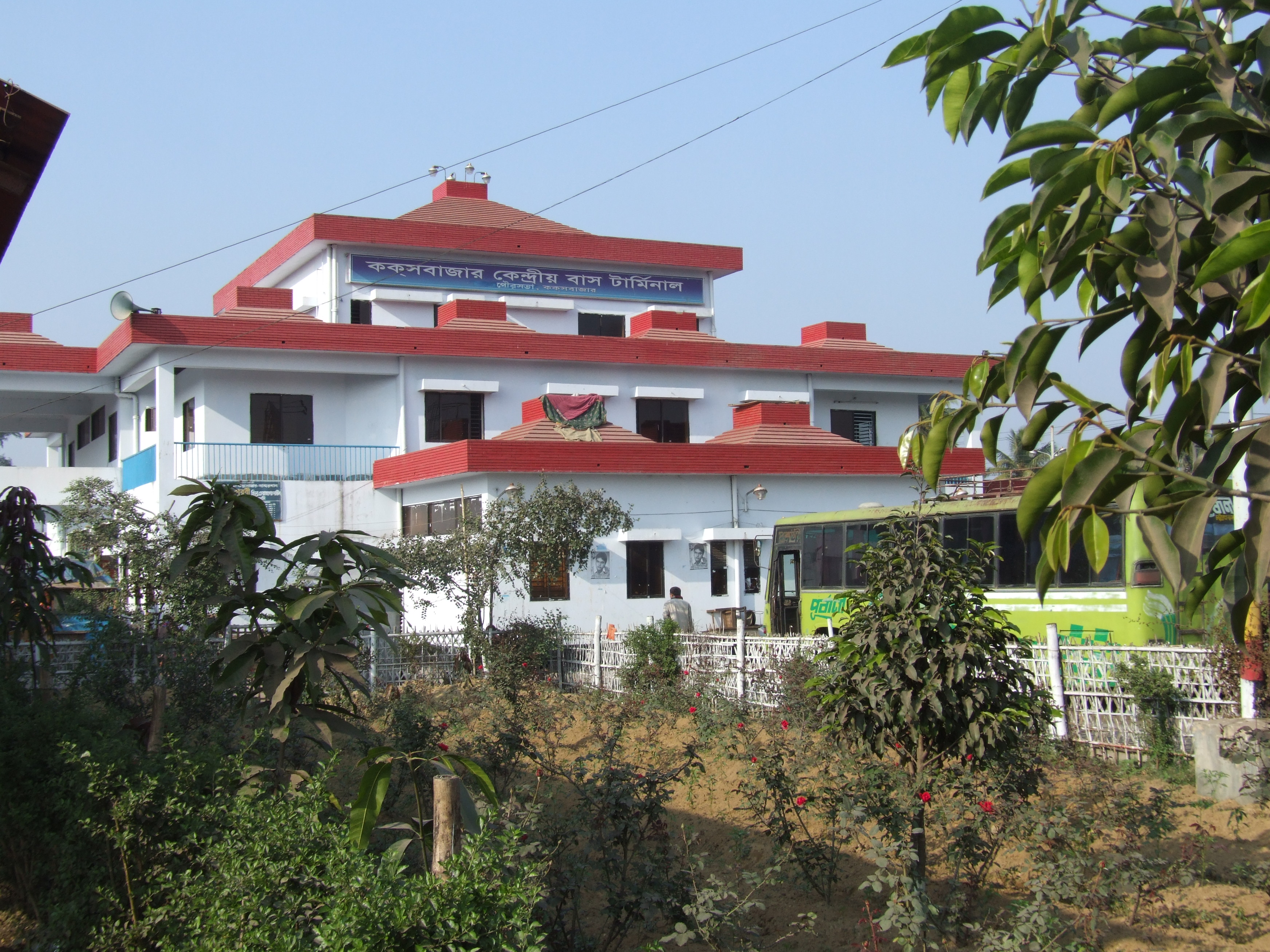

General information
- Location: Larpara, Cox's Bazar; Bangladesh
- Coordinates: 21.4272251°N 92.0041225°E
- System: Bus terminal
- Manager: Cox's Bazar Municipality
- Bus routes: National Highway 1

Construction
- Architectural style: Burmese

History
- Opened: 2001
Location

Cox's Bazar Bus Terminal is the central bus terminal for Cox's Bazar District. It is situated in Larpara which is outside of the border of Cox's Bazar, Bangladesh. It was established in 2001 to resolve traffic jam issues in the city which is maintained by the municipality authorities.

The terminal is closed after 5 pm even though it has to be open 24 hours a day. A number of multi-storey illegal shops have been built in front of the terminal where illegal drug trade takes place. Buses are parked outside the terminal as no parking space is available in the terminal caused by the illegal shops. Traffic jams have thus increased in the area. The terminal is in disuse due to illegal counters for long-distance buses in the city's Kolatoli Square.

On 24 January 2020, a LPG station was opened at the terminal. The terminal renovation and modernization project was inaugurated on the same date.
