= Cox's Bazar–Teknaf Marine Drive =

Longest marine drive in the world

Coordinates: 21.393151°N 92.000443°E

Z1098
- Cox’s Bazar–Teknaf Marine Drive
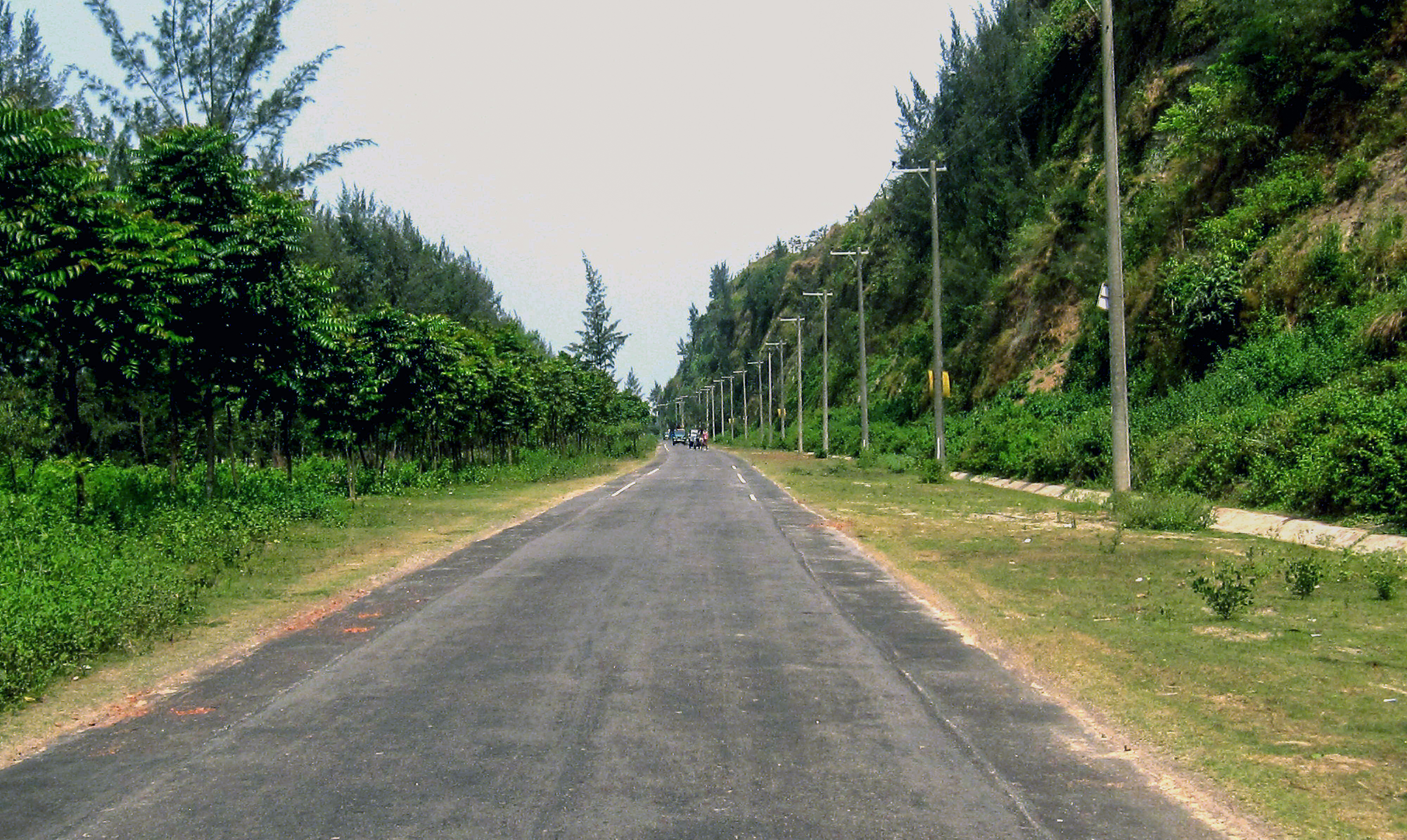

Route information
- Maintained by Bangladesh Road Transport Authority
- Length: 80 km (50 mi)

Major junctions
- North end: Kolatoli Square, Cox's Bazar
- South end: Shapla Square, Teknaf

Location
- Country: Bangladesh
- Major cities: Cox's Bazar, Teknaf

Highway system
- Roads in Bangladesh
← N110	→ N1

Cox’s Bazar–Teknaf Marine Drive (Bengali: কক্সবাজার–টেকনাফ মেরিন ড্রাইভ) is an 80 km (50 mi) long road from Cox’s Bazar to Teknaf along the Bay of Bengal and it is the world’s longest marine drive. It was inaugurated on 6 May 2017, by the then Prime Minister Sheikh Hasina.

== History ==
This road was first planned to be constructed in 1989. In 1993, the then government finalized the 48 km (30 mi) long marine drive project for construction. However, after the completion of the construction of a few kilometers, its work was terminated and later the incomplete road was washed away by the strong currents of the Bay of Bengal. Its construction resumed in 1995, when the Bangladesh Army was tasked with its construction. Construction work started for the second time in 2008 after the work was stopped for a few years. Construction of the road from Kolatoli to Inani was completed by 2015. As of December 2016, 60% of the first and second phase has been constructed. This road built at a cost of ৳456 crore was inaugurated on 5 May 2017. On 28 June 2022 Executive Committee of the National Economic Council (ECNEC) approved the widening project of the road. At least ten parts of the road were damaged by a storm in August 2023 and at one point part of the road disappeared into the sea.

== Tourism ==
On 26 June 2018, the road was declared as preserved tourist zone by the Ministry of Civil Aviation and Tourism. Since 2020, a bus operated by Caravan Services has been providing regular transport services for tourists on this road.

== Gallery ==
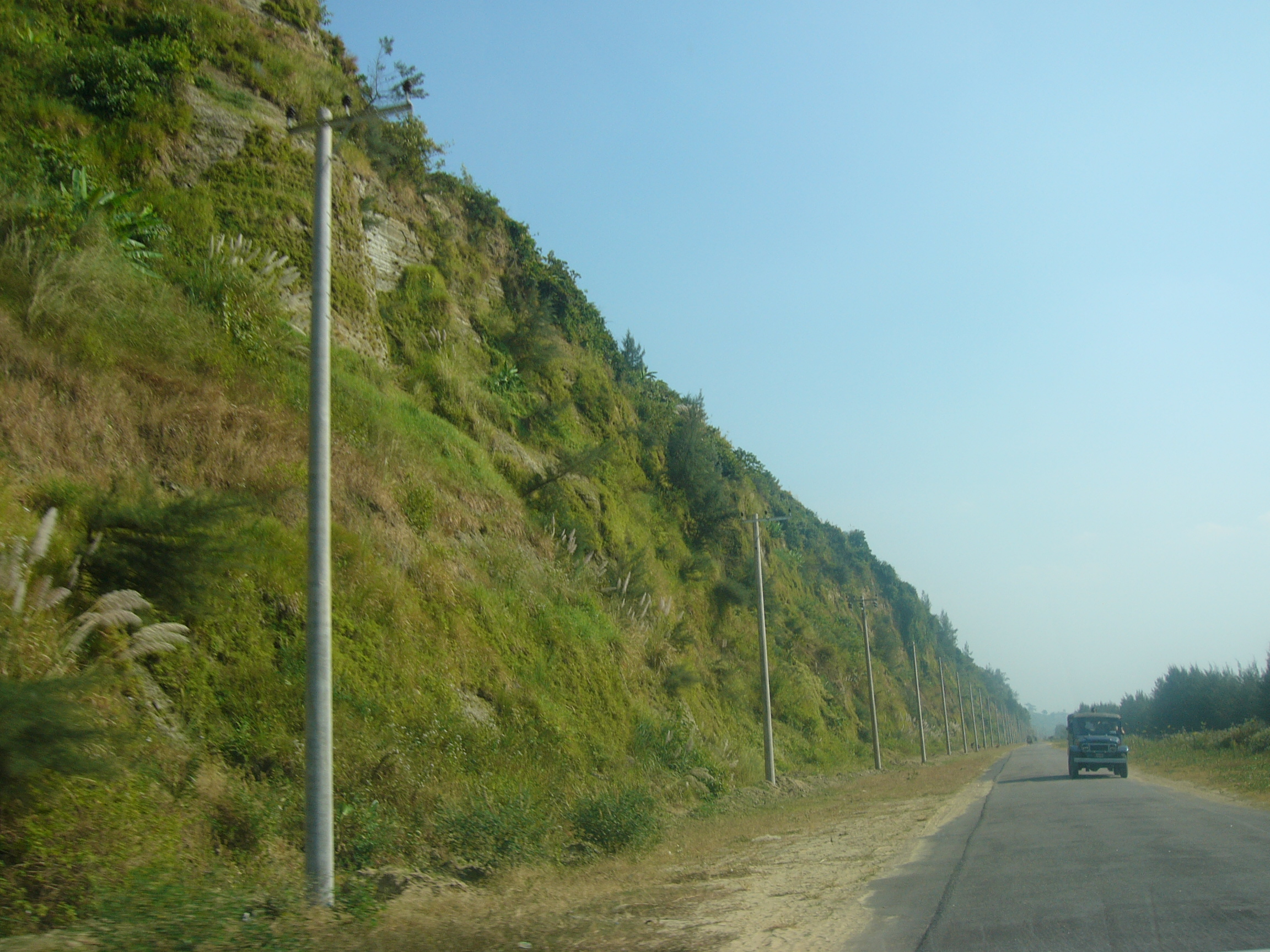

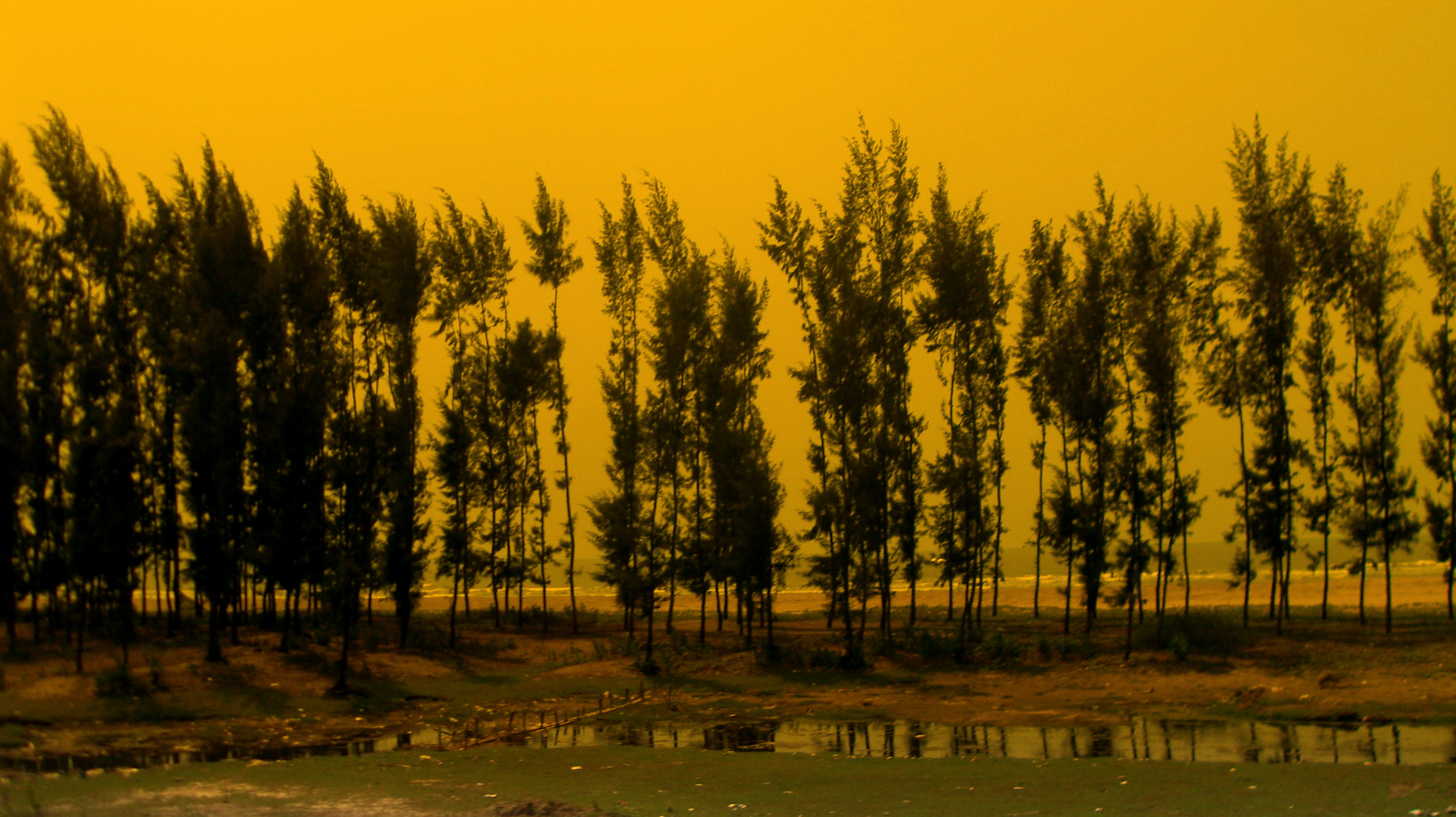

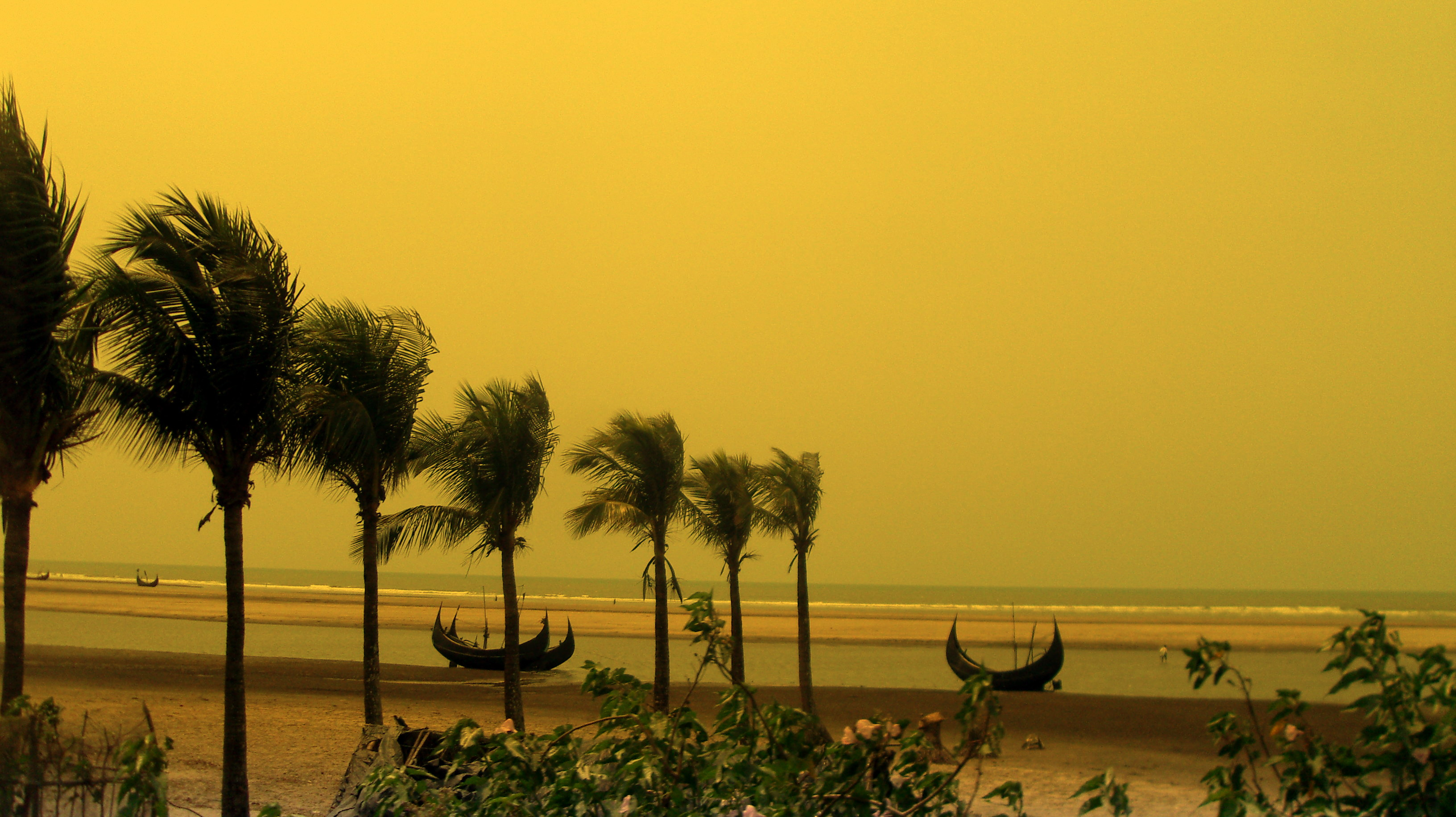

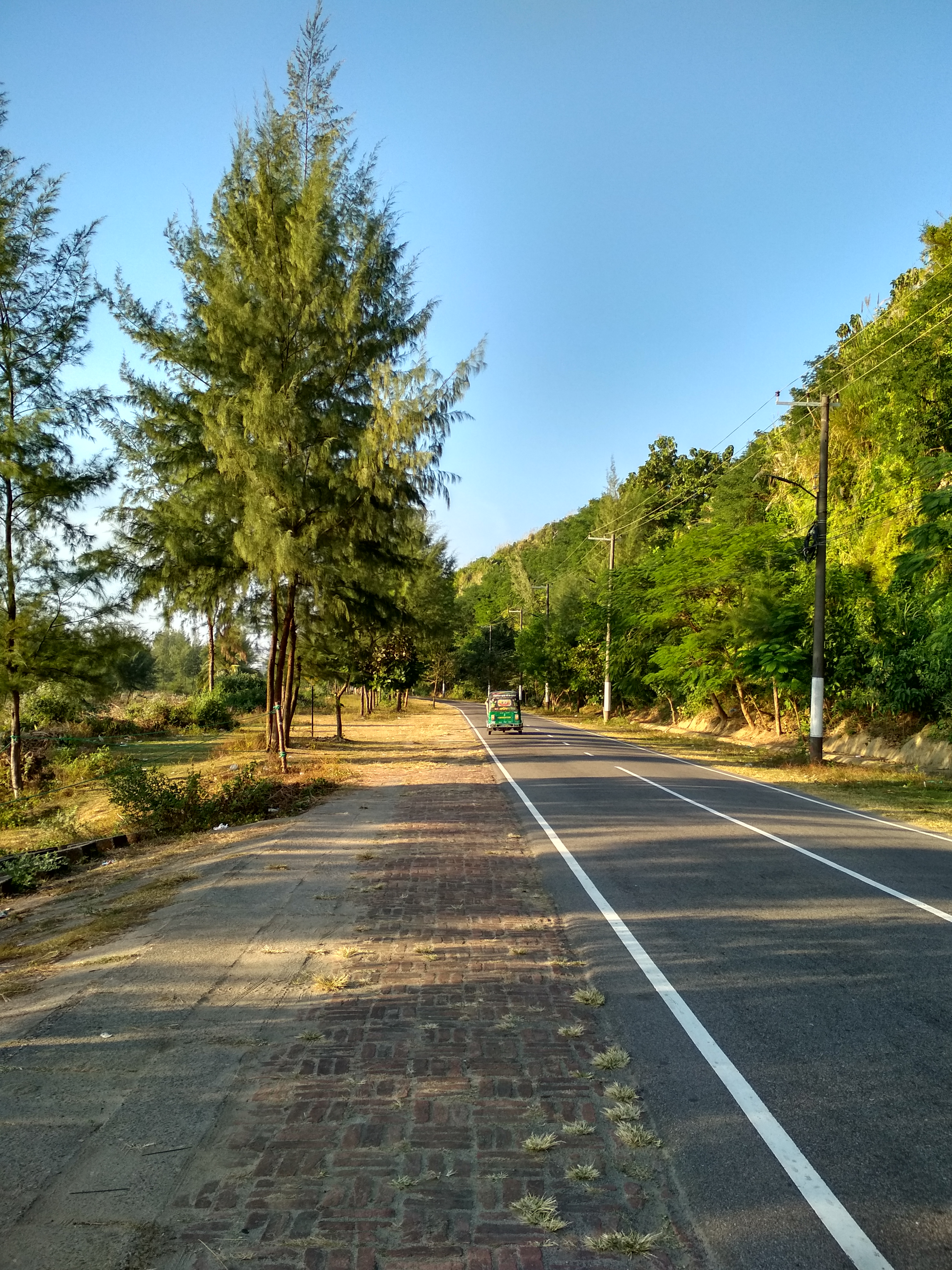

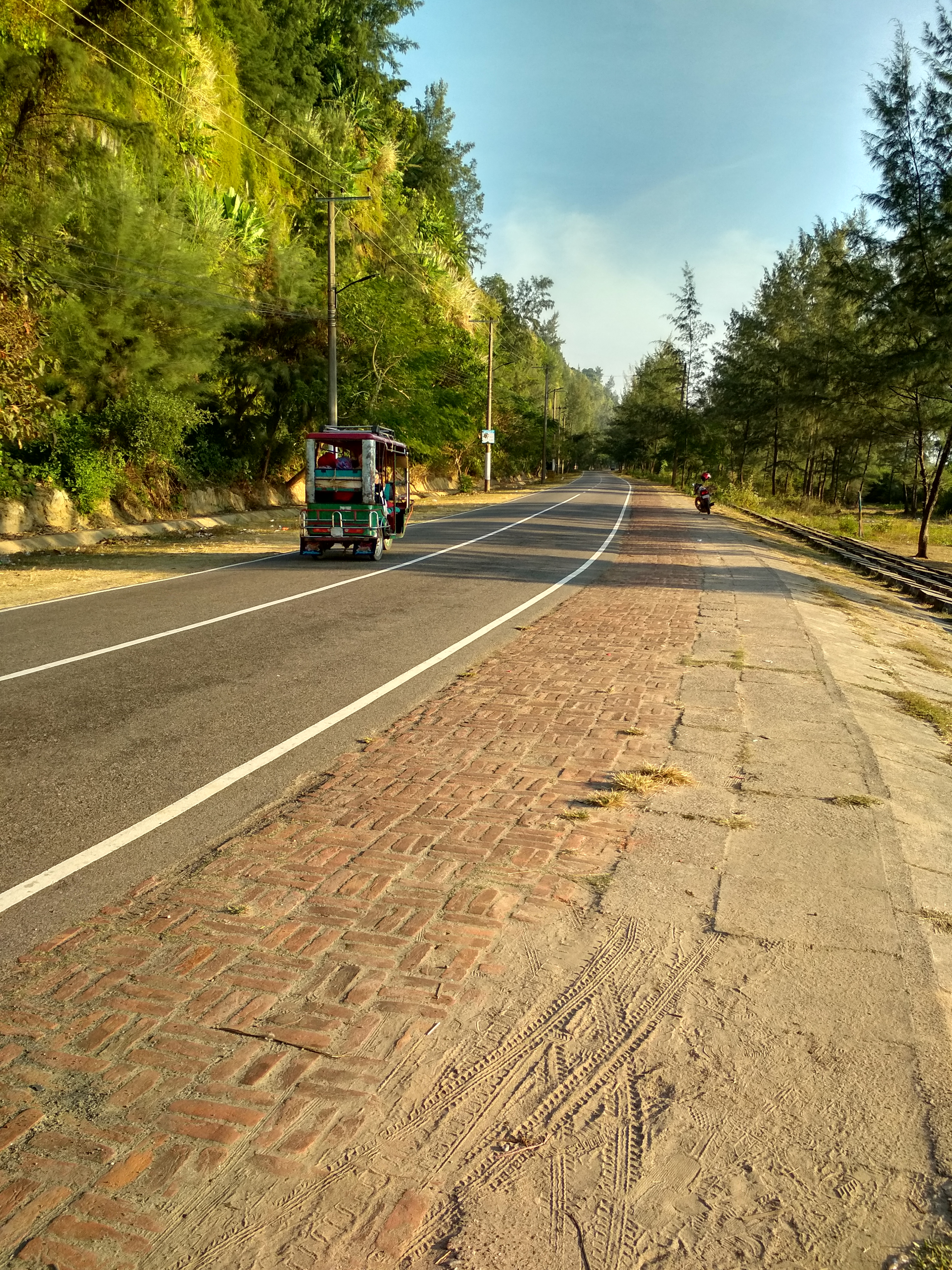

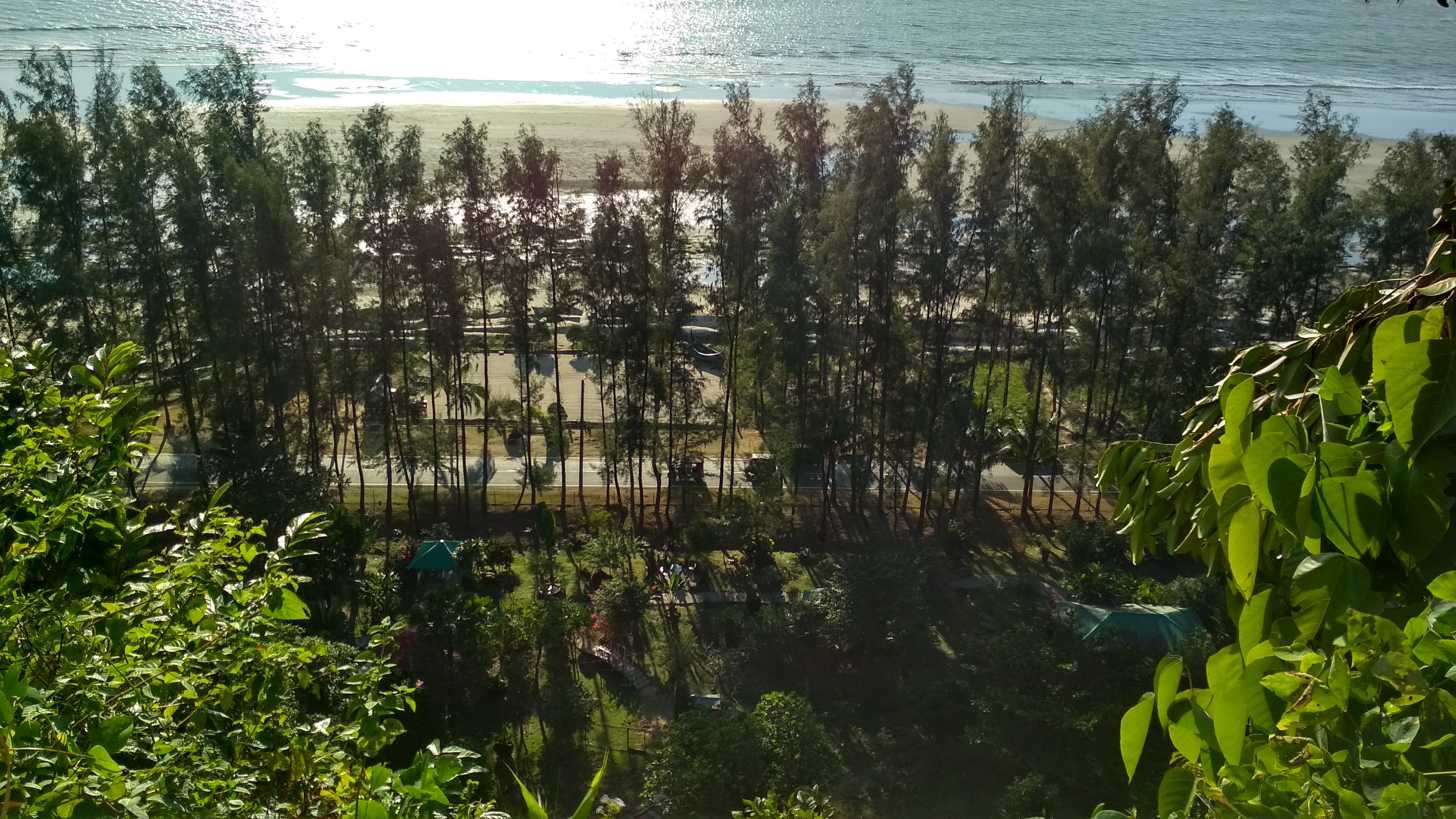

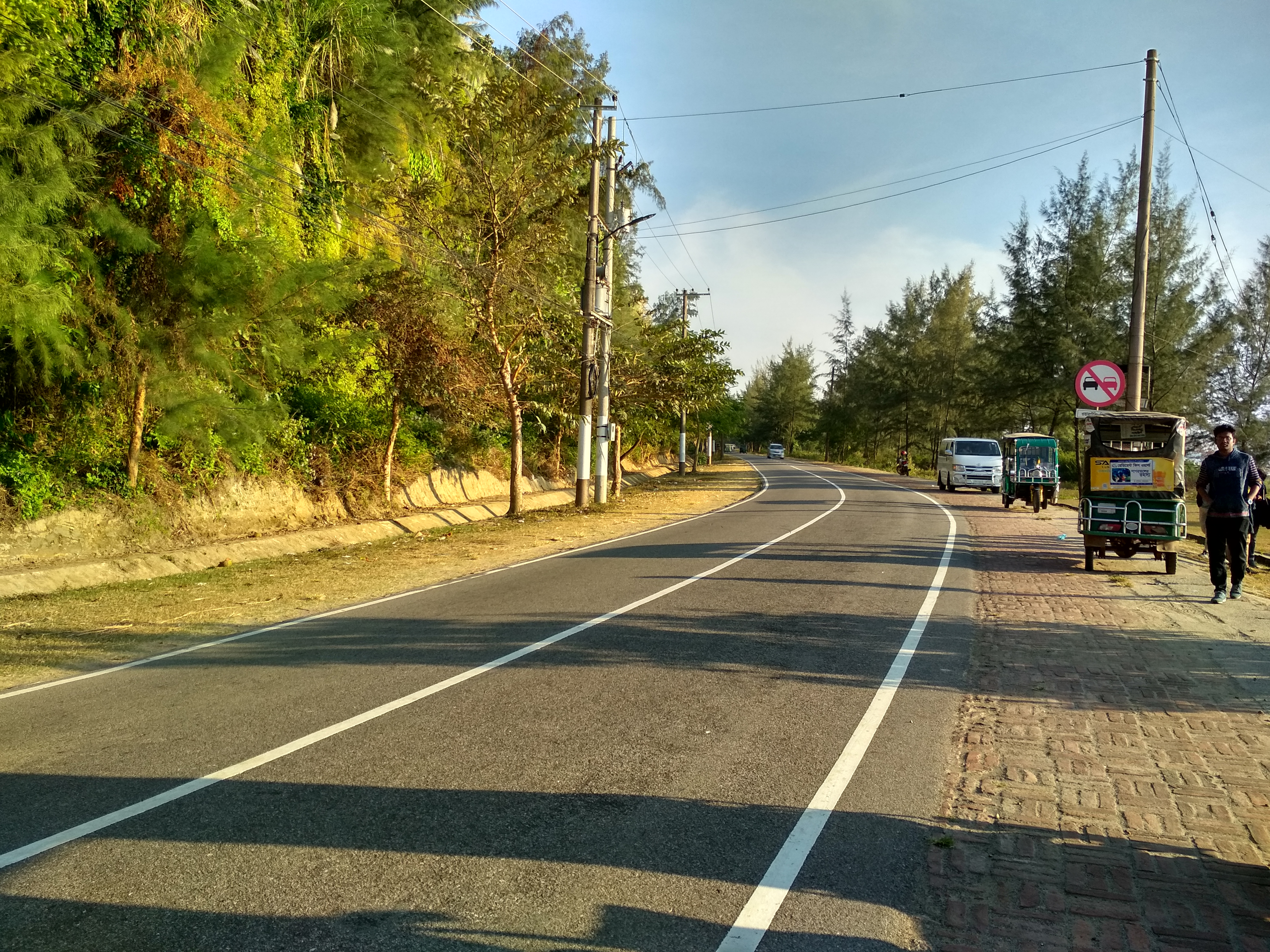

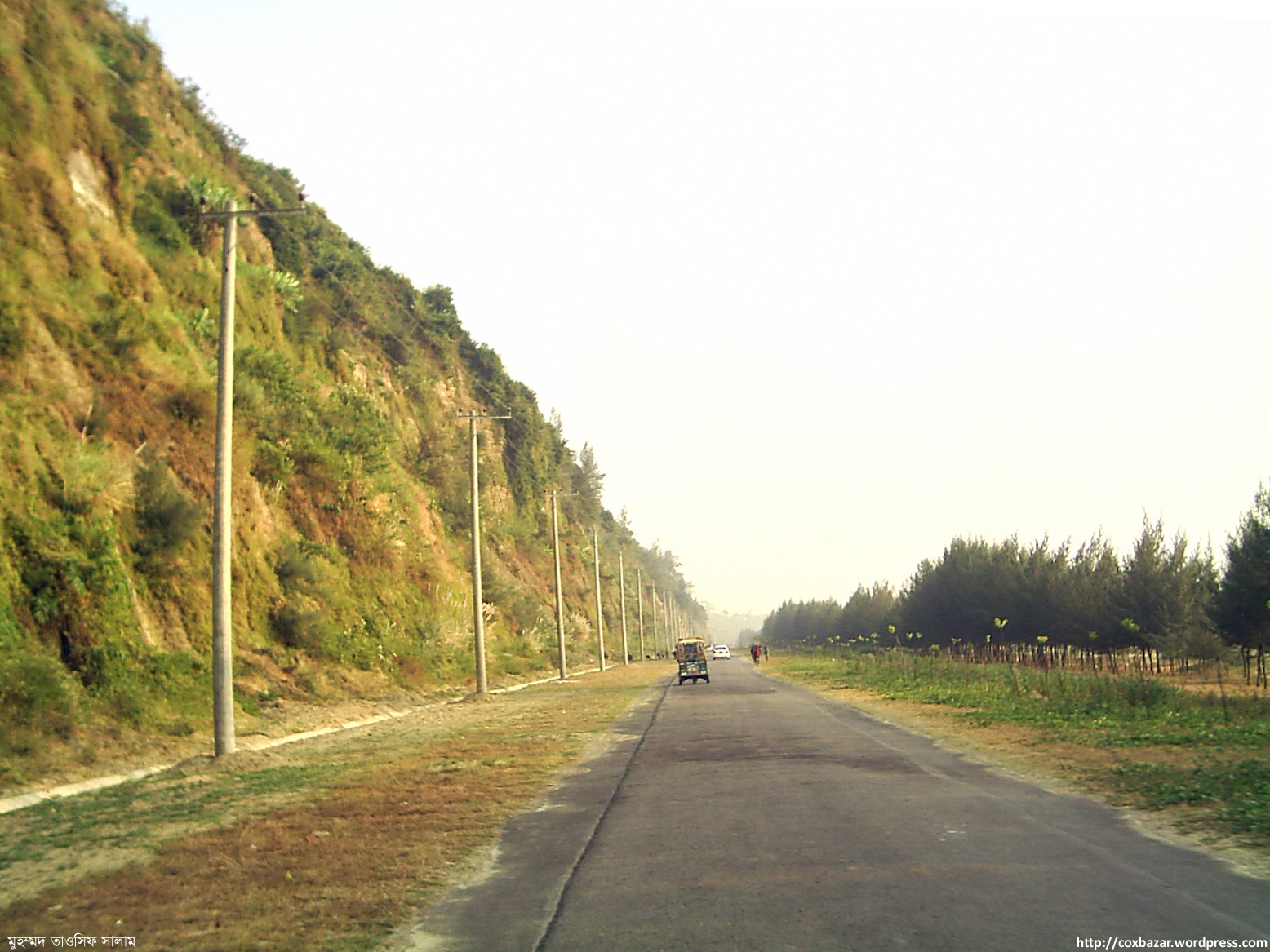

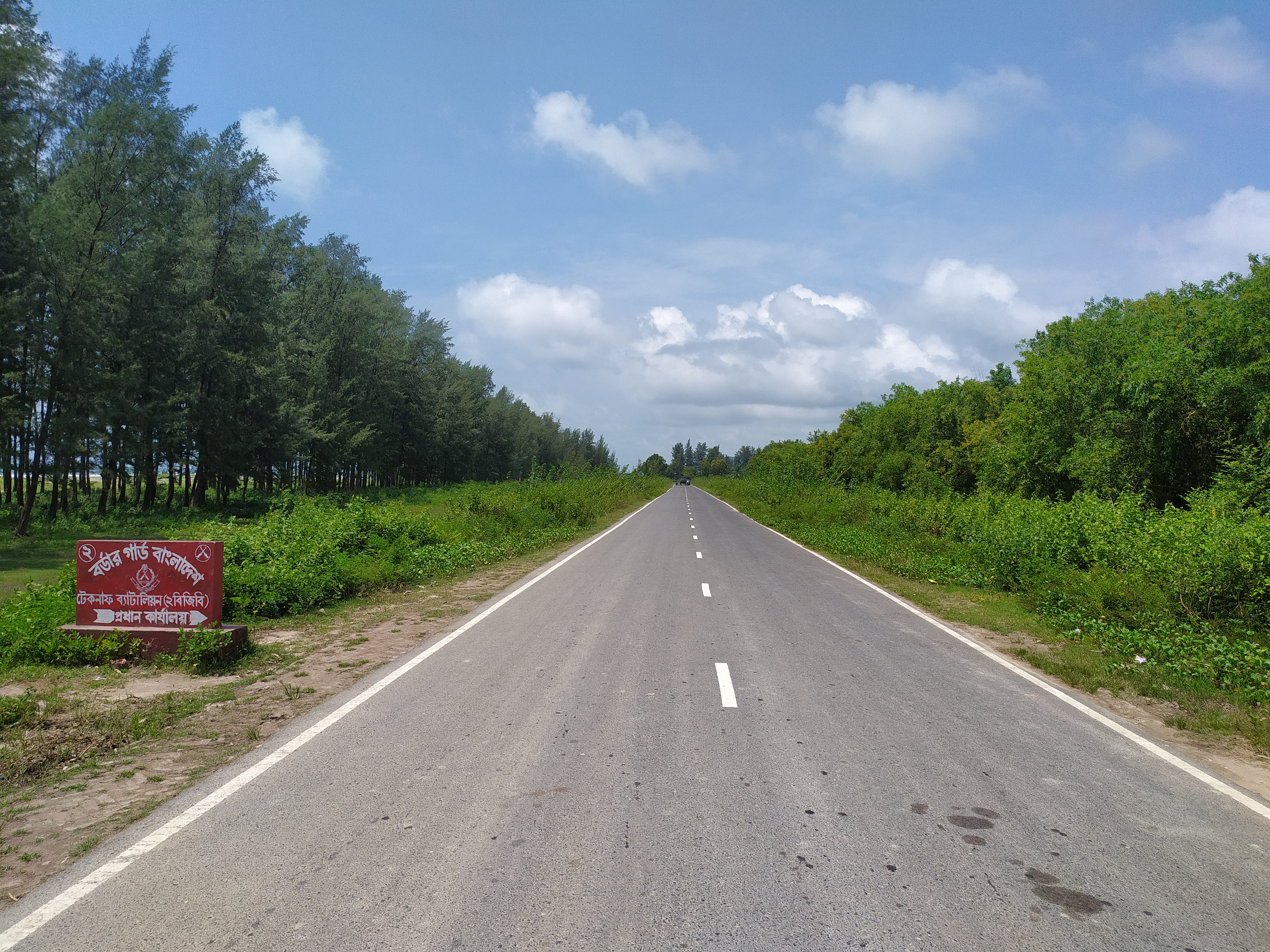

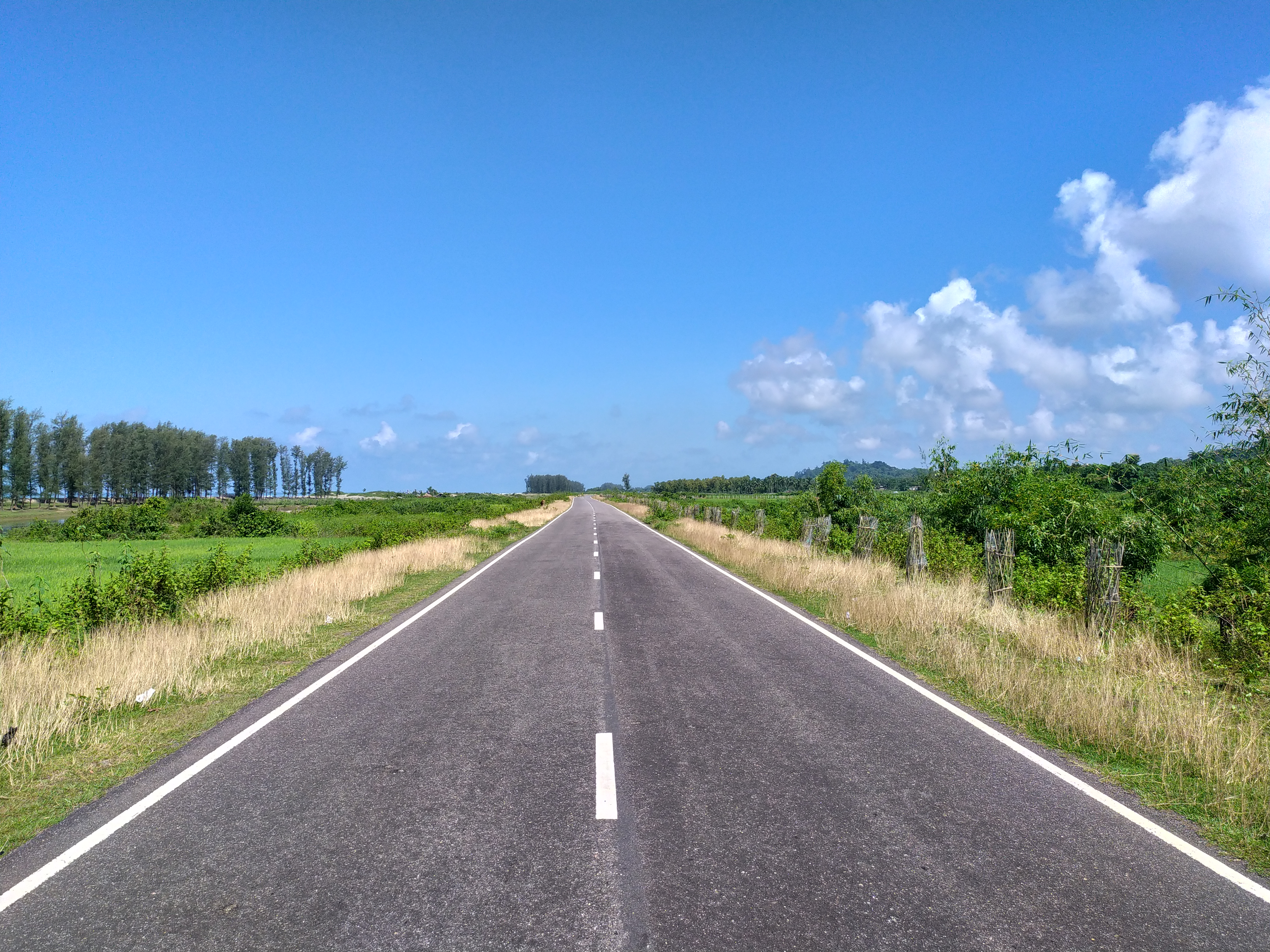

== See also ==
- Cox's Bazar Beach
