= Burmese Market =

Market in Bangladesh

The Burmese Market is a market located in Cox's Bazar, Bangladesh. The market is named after its diverse combination of products from Myanmar. The Burmese market is also popular for its pickles. A variety of pickles from Myanmar are available here. Many products are available here for low prices. The traditional Burmese market is located at Tekpara in Cox's Bazar. There are 306 shops in this Burmese market. Also there are various Burmese markets including Abu Center, Amena Shopping Complex, An Nahar Shopping Complex, Alochaya Shopping Complex, Banu Plaza, Beach Tower, Chowdhury Shopping Complex, Karim Burmese Market, Rukia Burmese Market, Saudia Burmese Market, Umme Burmese Market etc. Besides Cox's Bazar, there are also Burmese markets in Patenga and Bandarban.

== History ==
The Burmese Market was created in 1962 by a Burmese woman. She set up a pavilion in Tekpara that sold local products made by Rakhaine people. The pavilion was situated in her house. Burmese primary school was very close to it. Domestic and foreign tourists used to come to Cox's Bazar to see the things on its stage. Considering the demand of tourists, she opened a shop near her house. The shop was called 'Unang Cox's Bazar Cottage Industries'. Later many shops in the area established such as BB Fashion Diamond Store, Burmese stores, Nurani Emporium, Rakhine Store, Ume Store etc., Gradually that small shop became a big market.
