= Cox's Bazar Government College =

College in Cox's Bazar, Bangladesh

- কক্সবাজার সরকারি কলেজ
- Motto: From darkness to light
- Type: Public
- Established: 1962; 64 years ago
- Affiliations: National University, Bangladesh; Board of Intermediate and Secondary Education, Chattogram
- Chairman: Professor Abul Hasnat Md. Mofizul Hoque
- Academic staff: 100+
- Administrative staff: 70+
- Students: 13,000+
- Location: Cox's Bazar, Bangladesh; 21.4226°N 92.0188°E
- Campus: Urban, 18.92 acres (7.66 ha)
- Language: Bengali
- Website: www.cgc.edu.bd

Cox's Bazar Government College is a public educational institution in Cox's Bazar, Bangladesh. It is an A category government college in Bangladesh. It is a higher secondary school and also a degree awarding college of National University, Bangladesh.

== History ==
It was established as first government College in Cox's Bazar in 1962.

== Affiliation ==
It is affiliated with National University, Bangladesh and Chittagong Education Board.

== Faculties and Subjects ==
=== Faculty of Arts & Social Science ===
The faculty comprises the following departments:

- Department of Bengali
- Department of English
- Department of Political Science
- Department of History
- Department of Islamic History and Culture

=== Faculty of Science ===
The faculty comprises the following departments:

- Department of Physics
- Department of Chemistry
- Department of Botany
- Department of Zoology
- Department of Mathematics

=== Faculty of Business Studies ===
The faculty comprises the following departments:

- Department of Economics
- Department of Accounting
- Department of Management

== See also ==
- Education in Bangladesh
