= Mirsharai =

Town in Chittagong District, Chittagong Division

Mirsharai মীরসরাই
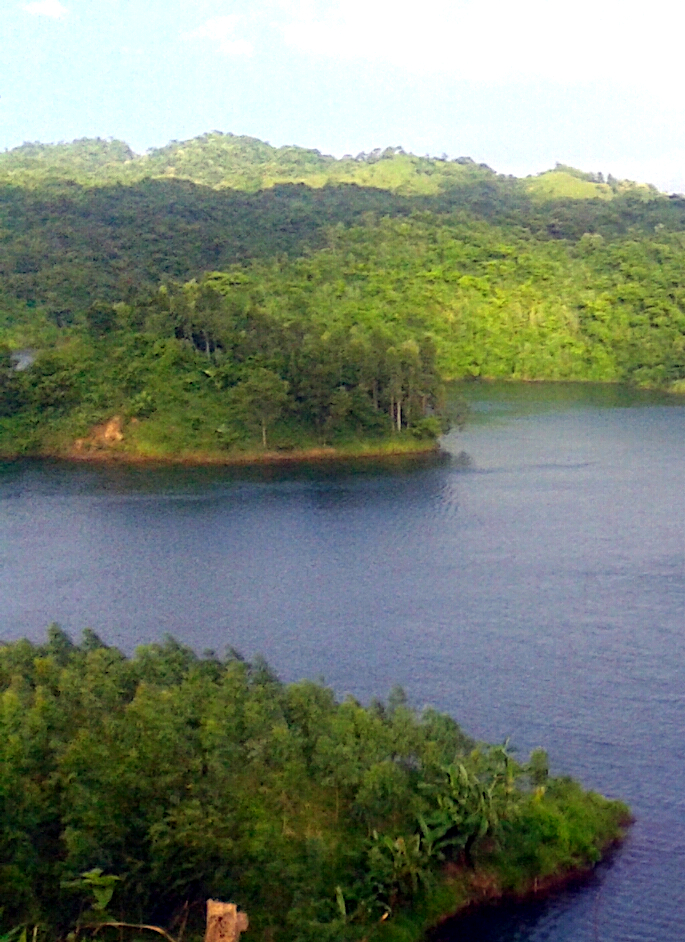
- Mohamaya lake at Mirsharai

- Location of Mirsharai in Bangladesh
- Coordinates: 22°30′20″N 91°34′20″E
- Country: Bangladesh
- Division: Chittagong Division
- District: Chittagong District
- Upazila: Mirsharai

Government
  - Type: Mayor–Council
  - Body: Mirsharai Municipality
  - Paura Mayor: Vacant

Area
  - Total: 12.2 km^{2} (4.7 sq mi)

Population (2011)
  - Total: 31,206
  - Density: 2,560/km^{2} (6,620/sq mi)
- Time zone: UTC+6 (Bangladesh Time)
- National Dialing Code: +880

Mirsharai (Bengali: মীরসরাই) is a town and municipality in Chittagong District of Chittagong Division, Bangladesh. The town is the headquarter and urban centre of Mirsharai Upazila.
