= Kolatoli Square =

Neighborhood in Cox's Bazar, Bangladesh

Coordinates: 21.4161291°N 91.9842666°E

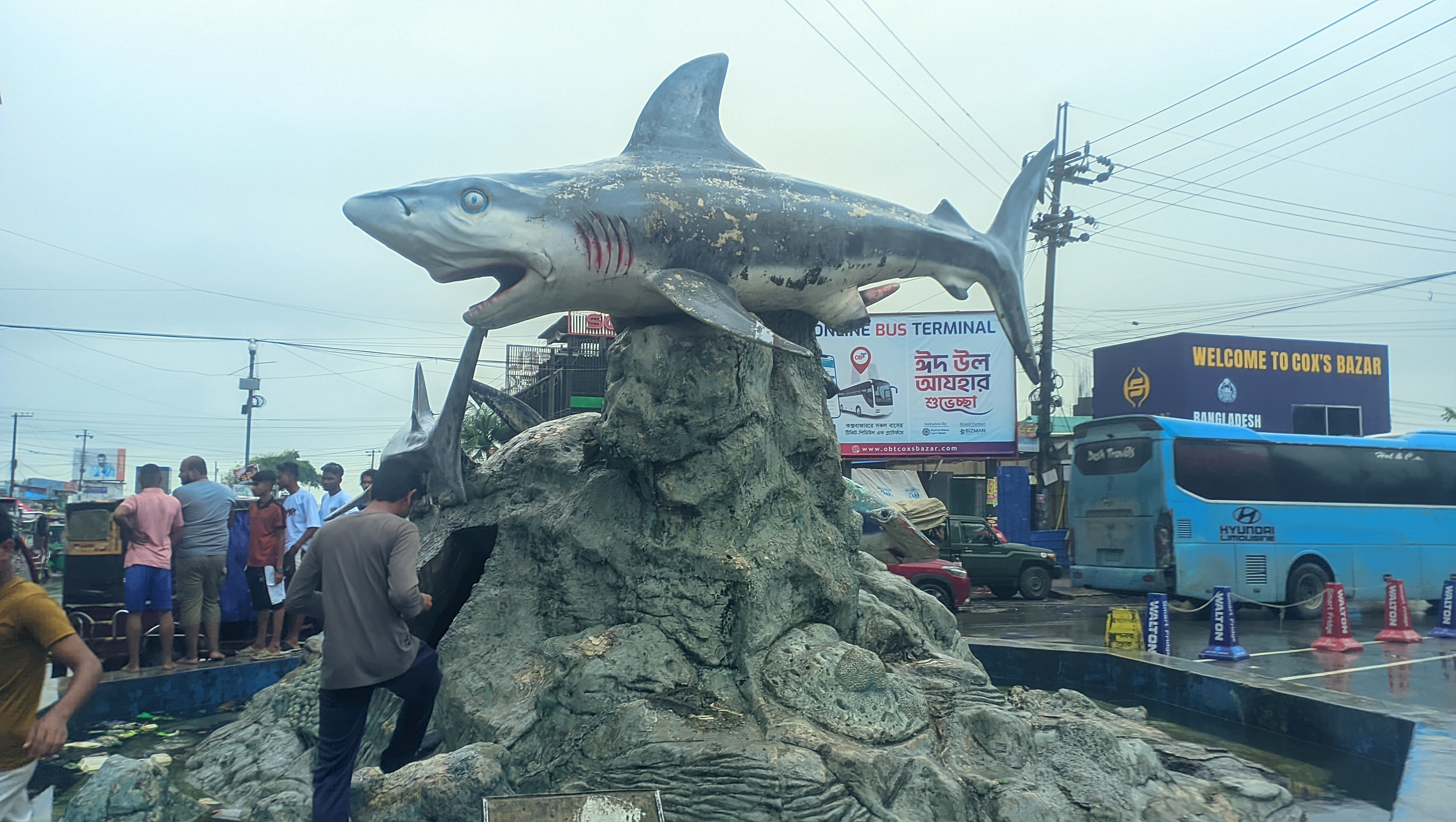

Kolatoli Square (also known as Dolphin Square and Shark Square) is a place in Cox's Bazar, Bangladesh. It can be reached from the capital Dhaka by taking the N110 highway from the N1. It spans 170 meters from the Dolphin fountain to shore of Cox's Bazar Beach. It is the entrance to the city for tourists. Cox's Bazar–Teknaf Marine Drive starts from here which leads to Sabrang Union in Teknaf. A shark sculpture was installed here in 2010. But as it is known as dolphin sculpture, it creates confusion among tourists. Besides, seeing the shark sculpture in Kolatoli, some people think that there are sharks in the sea water and refrain from bathing there. Considering these aspects, the district authority of Cox's Bazar decided to replace the shark sculpture with a new sculpture of Sheikh Mujibur Rahman in 2019. As the road slopes towards Kolatoli Square, accidents often occur here.
