= Mirsharai Municipality =

Municipality in Chittagong, Bangladesh

Mirsharai Municipality মীরসরাই পৌরসভা
- Municipality
- Location of the Mirsharai Municipality within Bangladesh
- Coordinates: 22°45′N 91°32′E
- Country: Bangladesh
- Division: Chittagong
- District: Chittagong
- Established: 8 November 2000
- Ward: 9

Government
  - Mayor: Vacant

Area
  - Total: 10.50 km^{2} (4.05 sq mi)

Population (2022)
  - Total: 21,611
  - Density: 2,058/km^{2} (5,331/sq mi)
- Time zone: UTC+6:00
- Postal code: 4320

Mirsharai Municipality (Bengali: মীরসরাই পৌরসভা) is a Class A municipality in the Mirsharai Upazila of Chittagong District in the Chittagong Division of Bangladesh.

== History ==
Mirsharai Municipality was inaugurated on 8 November 2000. According to the government gazette notification (S.R.O No-358/Act-2000, dated 10 December 2000), the municipality was officially declared, and its activities commenced on 12 April 2001. It was later upgraded to a "Class A" municipality in 2023. The municipality was formed with six mouzas: Machimpur, Raghabpur, Middle Maghadia, Kismat Jafarabad, East Maghadia and Govania.

== Geography ==
The area of Mirsharai municipality is 10.50 square kilometres.

== Demographics ==
According to the 2022 census, the population of Mirsharai Municipality was 21,611, of which 10,392 were males and 11,219 were females. The municipality had a total of 5,158 families.

== Administrative area ==
Mirsharai Municipality is located in the central part of Mirsharai Upazila, about 60 kilometres away from the Chittagong District headquarters. It is bounded on the north by Mithanala Union, Maghadia Union and Mirsharai Union; on the east by Maghadia Union, Mirsharai Union and Khaiyachhara Union; on the south by Khaiyachhara Union and Mayani Union; and on the west by Saherkhali Union, Ichhakhali Union, Mithanala Union and Maghadia Union.

Mirsharai Municipality is part of Chittagong-1 (Constituency 278) of the Jatiya Sangsad. The municipal administration falls under Mirsharai Thana. The municipality consists of 9 wards and 27 villages or mahallas.

The villages/mahallas under each ward are as follows:
Ward No.	Villages/Mahallas
1	Middle Talbaria (partial)
2	Middle Talbaria (partial), South Talbaria (partial), East Mirsharai (partial)
3	South Talbaria (partial), East Mirsharai (partial), Noapara, East Govania (partial)
4	East Mirsharai (partial), East Govania (partial), Ambaria (partial)
5	West Mirsharai, 2 No. Tarakatia (partial), Govania (partial)
6	Govania (partial), Middle Maghadia (partial), 2 No. Tarakatia (partial)
7	Middle Maghadia (partial), 2 No. Tarakatia (partial), Tarakatia (partial), Govania (partial)
8	Nazir Para, Tarakatia (partial), Poddar Taluk (partial)
9	Middle Maghadia (partial), Poddar Taluk (partial)

== Government ==
=== Mayors ===
- Current Mayor: Vacant.

List of Municipal Administrators and Mayors:
Years	Mayor	Political Party
2001–2001	Azharul Haque Chowdhury	Independent
2001–2002	Mohammad Abdul Hai	Independent
2002–2010	Abul Faruk Mia	BNP
2011–2015	Md Shahjahan	Awami League
2015 – 2024	Gias Uddin	Awami League

== Education ==
According to the Bangladesh Population and Housing Census 2022, the literacy rate of Mirsharai Municipality is 83.93%.

Educational institutions in Mirsharai Municipality
Type of Institution	Number
College	1
Kamil Madrasa	1
Secondary School	2
Model School and College	1
Nurani Madrasa	3
Government Primary School	3
Municipal Primary School	1
Maktab/Forkania Madrasa	20
Kindergarten	1

== Health ==
Health facilities in Mirsharai Municipality
Type of Facility	Number
Health Complex	1
Family Planning Clinic	1
Private Hospital	2
Diagnostic Center	2
Community Clinic	1

== Transportation ==
The main road of communication in Mirsharai Municipality is the Dhaka-Chittagong Highway. In addition, there are 35 kilometers of paved roads and 10 kilometers of semi-paved roads within the municipality.

== Economy ==
Mirsharai Municipality has 3 industrial factories and 5 small-scale cottage industries.
