= Mirsharai (disambiguation) =

Mirsharai is a town in Bangladesh. It may also refer to:

- Mirsharai Upazila, a upazila in Bangladesh
- Mirsharai Union, a union in Chittagong district
- Mirsharai Municipality, a municipality in Bangladesh
