= Mirsharai Union =

Union of Mirsharai Upazila, Chittagong District, Bangladesh

Mirsharai Union মীরসরাই ইউনিয়ন
- Union
- Location in Bangladesh
- Country: Chittagong Bangladesh
- Division: Chittagong Division
- District: Chittagong District
- Upazilas: Mirsharai Upazila

Government
  - Chairman: Vacant

Area
  - Total: 11.4 km^{2} (4.4 sq mi)

Population (2011)
  - Total: 16,828
- Time zone: UTC+6 (BST)
- Postal code: 4320
- Website: mirsharaiup.chattogram.gov.bd

Mirsharai Union is a union, the smallest administrative body of Bangladesh, located in Mirsharai Upazila, Chittagong District, Bangladesh. The total population is 16,828.

== History ==
Mirsharai Union is an ancient administrative unit. A renowned Sufi and religious scholar, Mir Saheb, established a Tavern here during the British colonial period. The union was subsequently named after this Tavern. The union council was initially located at Mirsharai Municipality but in 2012 it was relocated approximately 1 kilometre north to Jafarabad village.

== Area ==
The area of Mirsharai Union is 2,816 acres (11.4 square kilometers).

== Demographics ==
According to the 2011 Bangladeshi census, the total population of Mirsharai Union was 16,828. Of these, 7,953 were males and 8,875 were females. The total number of households was 3,164.

== Geography ==
Mirsharai Union is located in the central part of Mirsharai Upazila, about 2 kilometres away from the upazila headquarters. It is bounded on the south by Khaiyachhara Union, on the east by Karerhat Union, on the north by Durgapur Union, and on the west by Mithanala Union and Mirsharai Municipality.

== Administration ==
Mirsharai Union is the No. 9 Union Parishad under Mirsharai Upazila. The administrative activities of this union fall under the jurisdiction of Mirsharai Thana. It is part of Chittagong-1 (Constituency 278) of the National Parliament of Bangladesh. Mirsharai Union is divided into 8 mouzas. The villages of the union are distributed across its nine wards as follows:

Ward No.	Villages
1	West Mathbaria
2	East Mathbaria, Amantola, Mithachara (part)
3	Mithachara (part), Amantola, Mandarbaria, Jorpuni
4	Goriaish
5	Sripur, Abunagar
6	North Talbaria, Middle Talbaria
7	East Kishmat Jafarabad, Tarakatia (part)
8	West Kishmat Jafarabad (part), Mithachara (part)
9	Tarakatia (part), West Kishmat Jafarabad (part), Bakkhola, South Talbaria, Ukil Para

== Education ==
According to the 2011 Bangladeshi census, the literacy rate of Mirsharai Union was 54.4%.
