= Arshinagar Future Park =

Park in Chittagong, Bangladesh

- আরশিনগর ফিউচার পার্ক
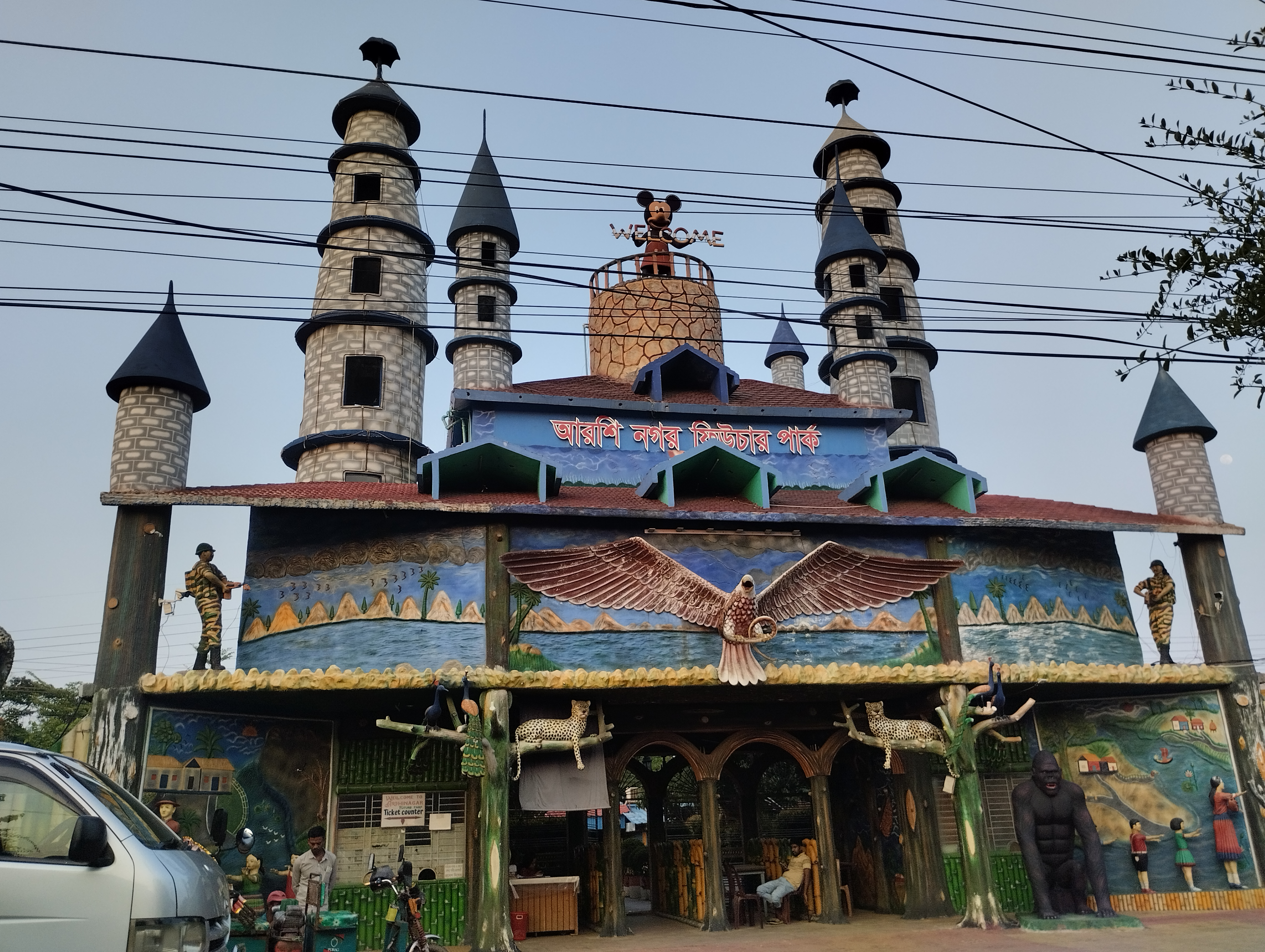
- Entrance of Arshinagar Future Park
- Interactive map of Arshinagar Future Park
- Type: Amusement park
- Location: Jorarganj, Mirsharai, Chittagong, Bangladesh
- Coordinates: 22°51′56″N 91°32′40″E
- Area: 70 acres (0.28 km^{2})
- Established: 2008; 18 years ago
- Owner: Nasir Uddin Didar
- Operator: Md. Jamal Uddin
- Visitors: Up to 14,000 per day; capacity ~20,000
- Open: 09:00–21:00 (BST)
- Status: Open all year
- Paths: 70 km (43 mi)
- Species: 981 tree species
- Parking: 300
- Inaugurated: 14 April 2010; 16 years ago
- Facilities: Restaurant, shopping mall, camping and resort etc

Arshinagar Future Park (Bengali: আরশিনগর ফিউচার পার্ক) is an amusement park located in Mirsharai Upazila, Chittagong, Bangladesh. The park is situated alongside the Dhaka–Chittagong Highway. It was established in 2008 by Nasir Uddin Didar on 12 acres of land and later expanded to more than 70 acres. The park was officially inaugurated on 14 April 2010.

== Description ==
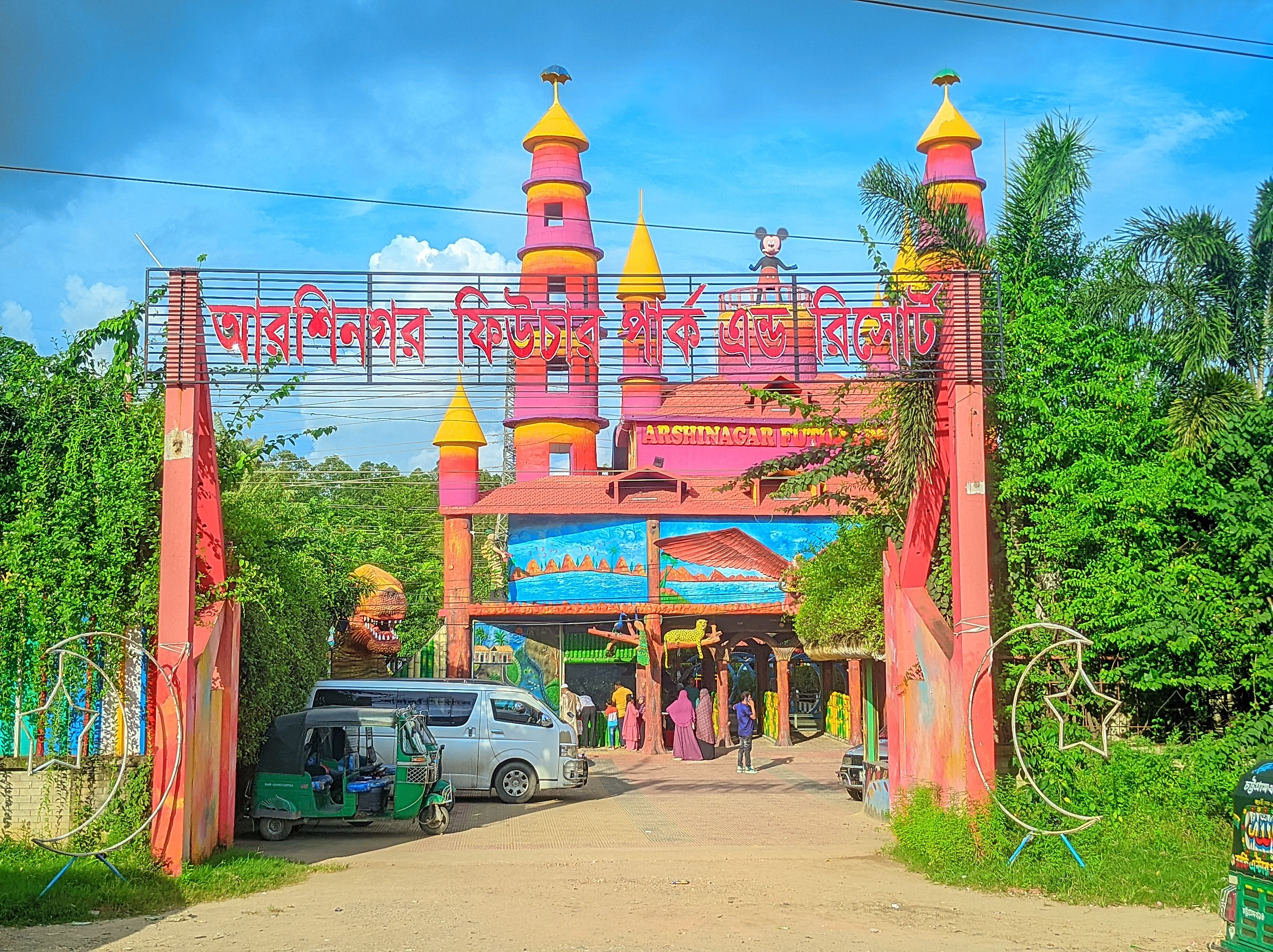
Entrance

The park is situated on approximately 70 acres of hilly and sloping land in the Sonapahar area of Jorarganj Union, on the eastern side of the Dhaka–Chittagong Highway. Construction of the recreation center was initiated in 2008 by Nasir Uddin Didar, and the park was officially inaugurated on 14 April 2010.

The park is landscaped with artificial fountains, flower gardens, two artificial lakes, and approximately 981 species of trees, with bird pots installed to encourage natural habitats. Around 300 staff members maintain operations and ensure safety. Located beside the Dhaka–Chittagong Highway, the park provides parking for 300 vehicles and can accommodate up to 20,000 visitors at a time, with a record attendance of 14,000 in a single day.

== Gallery ==
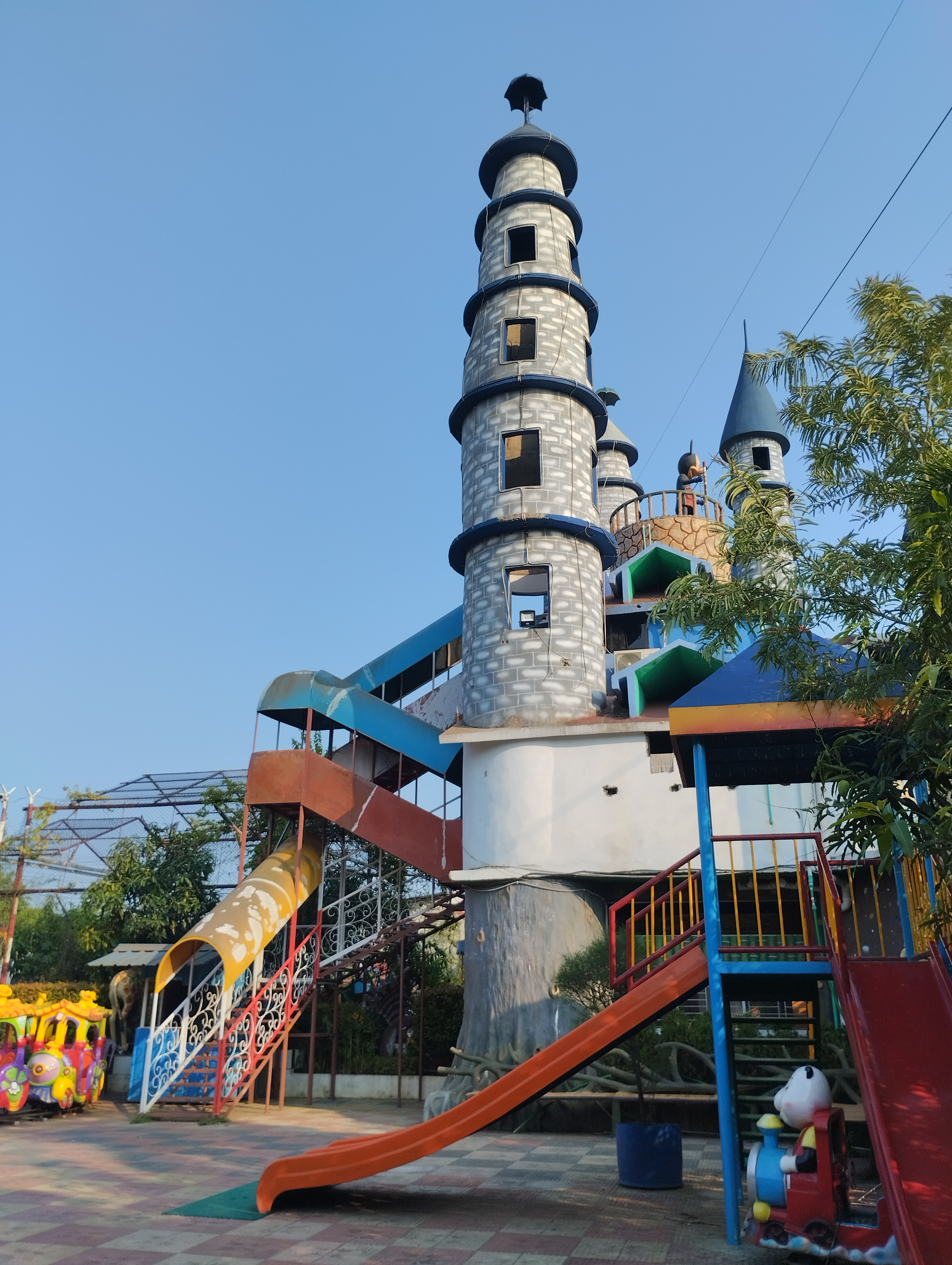
Park entrance

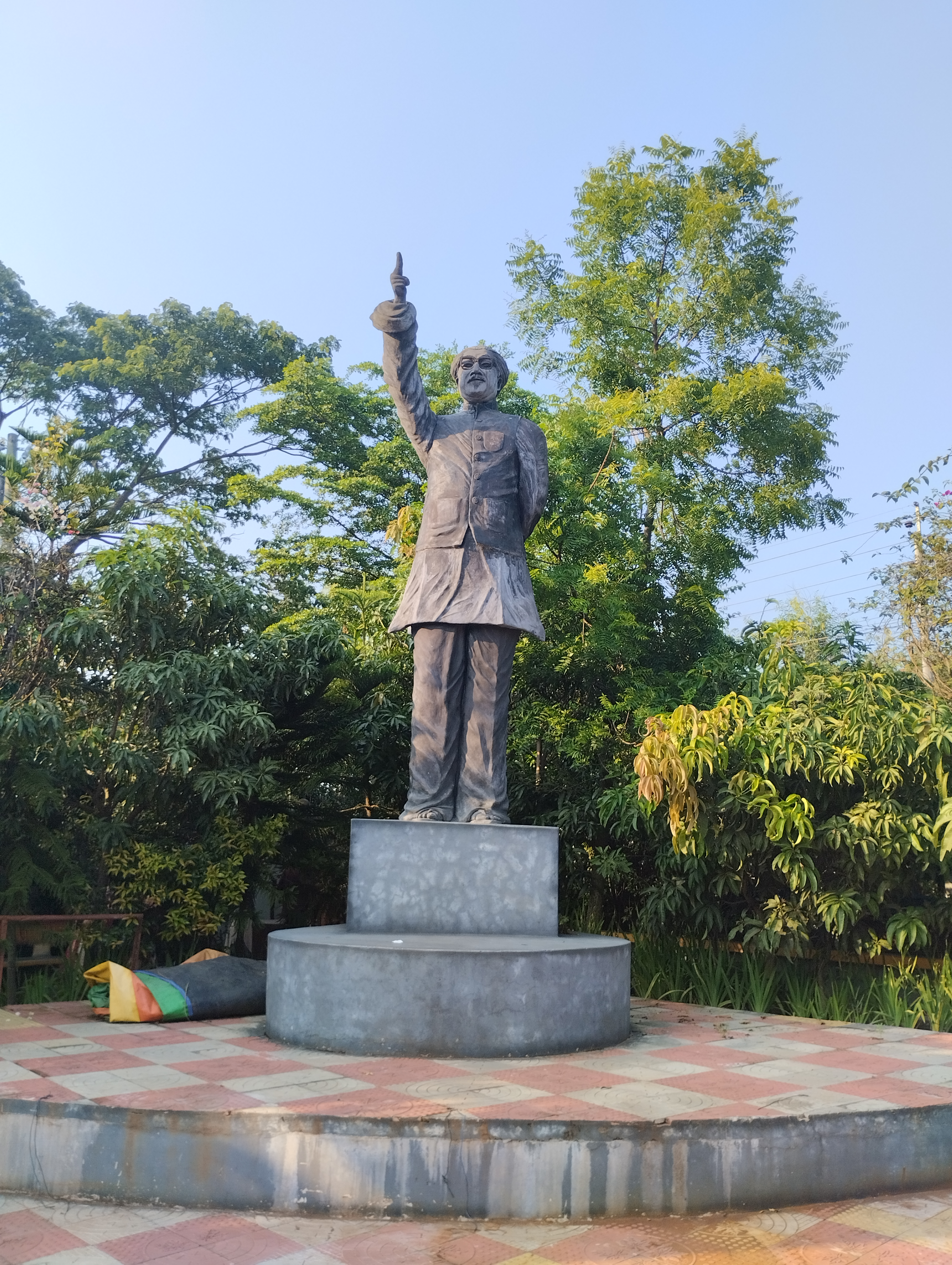
Statue of Sheikh Mujibur Rahman

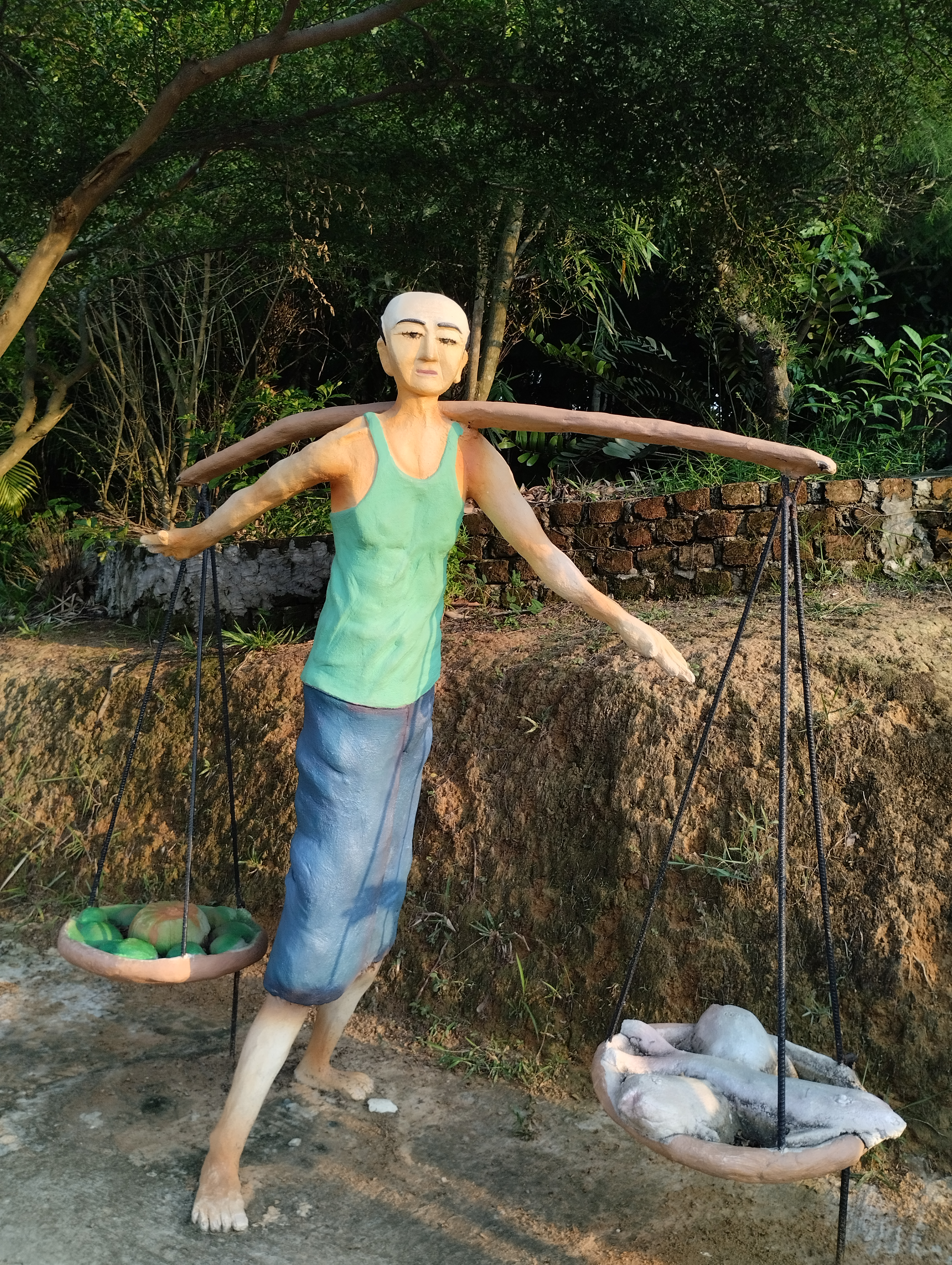
A vendor carrying goods on his shoulder

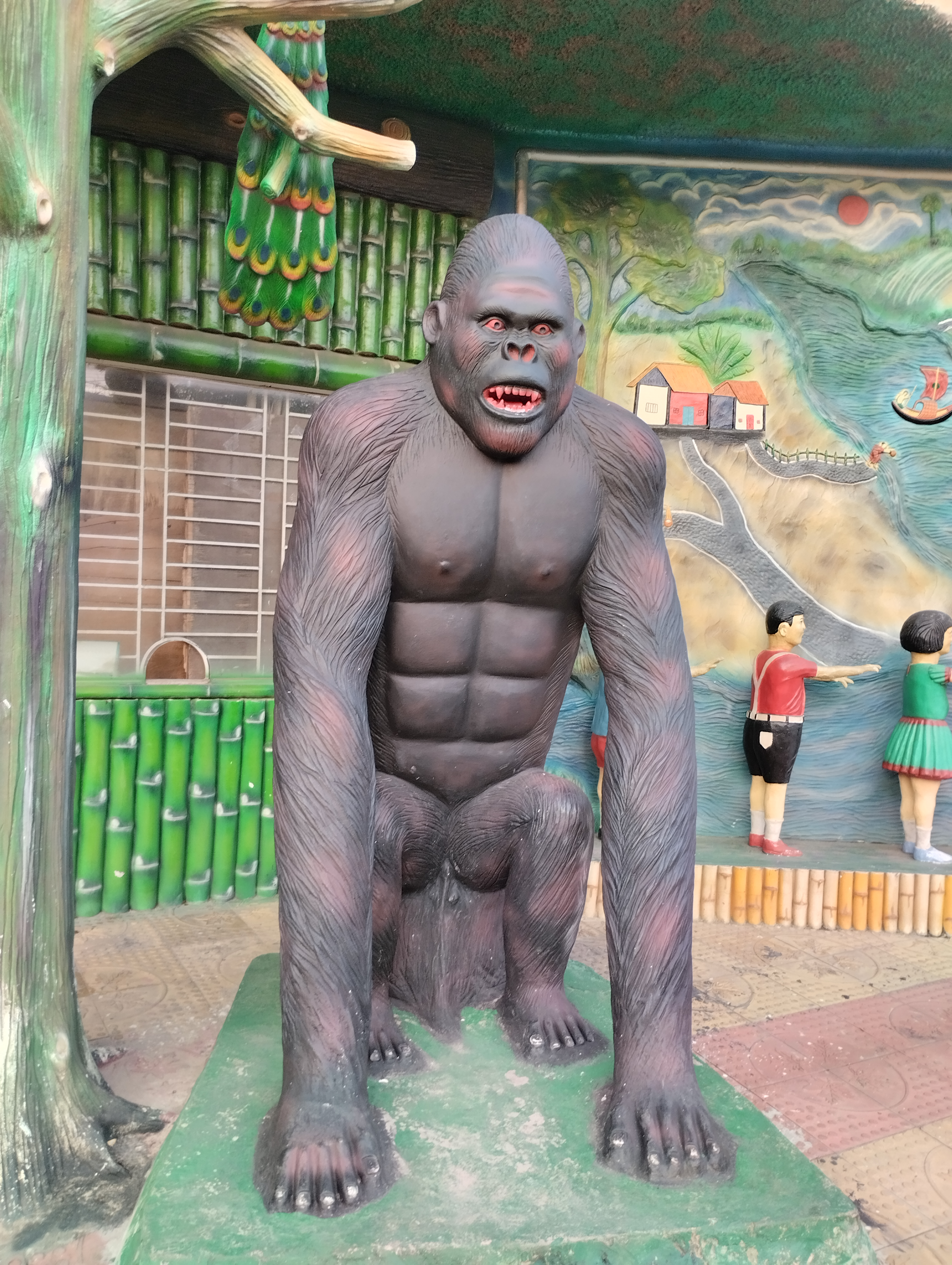
A Gorilla sculpture

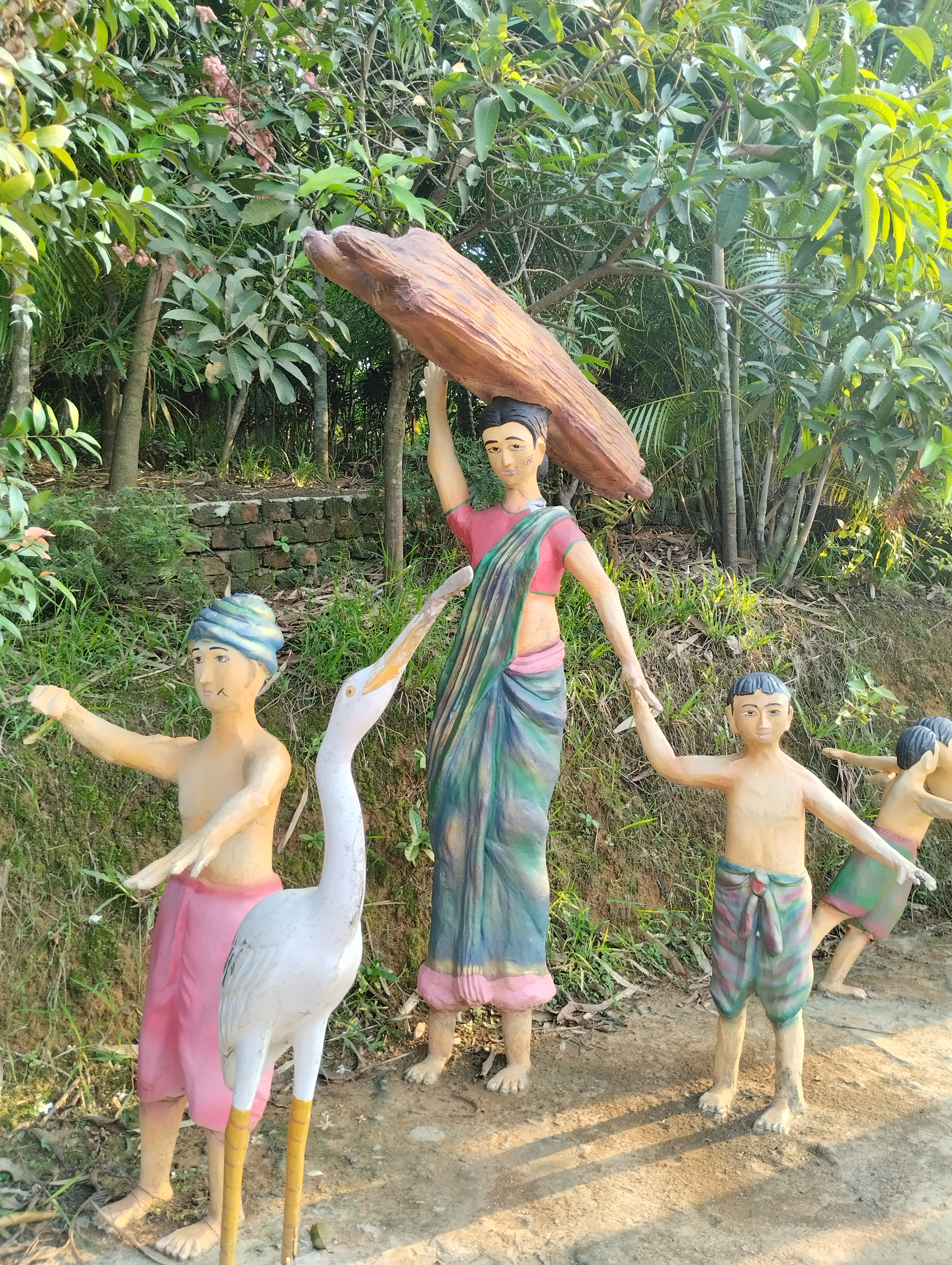
A woman standing with her child

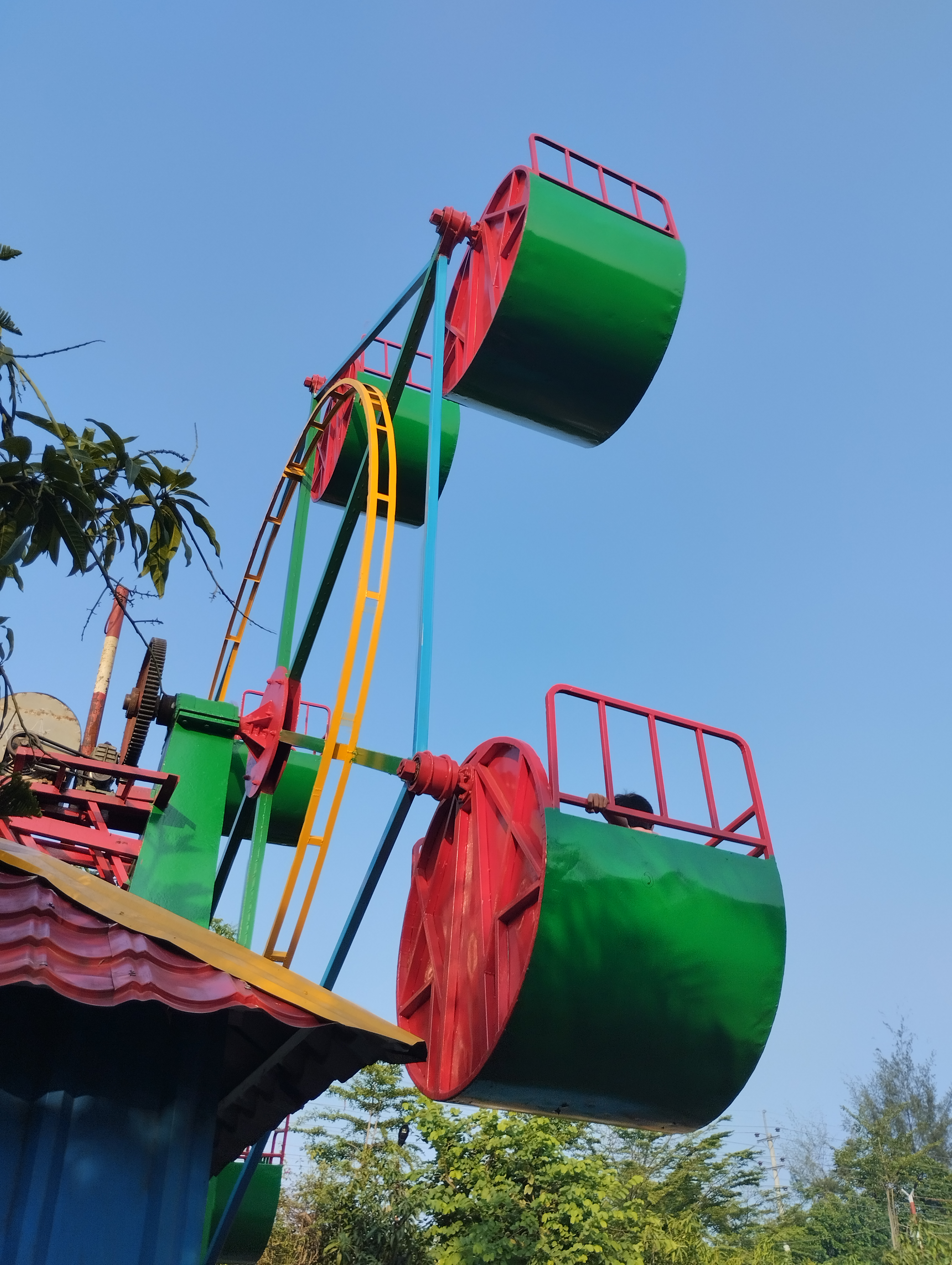
Ferris wheel

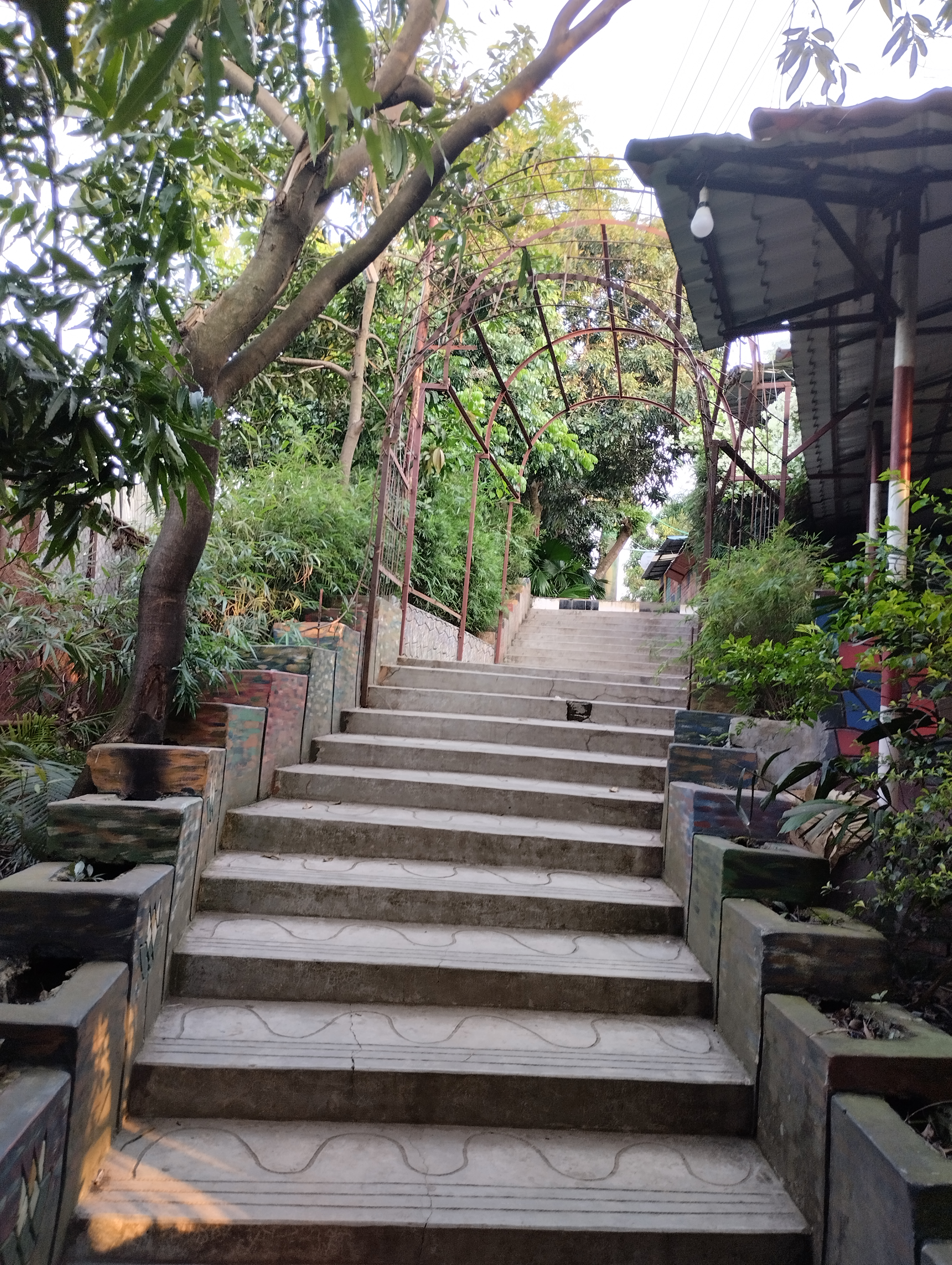
Park stairs

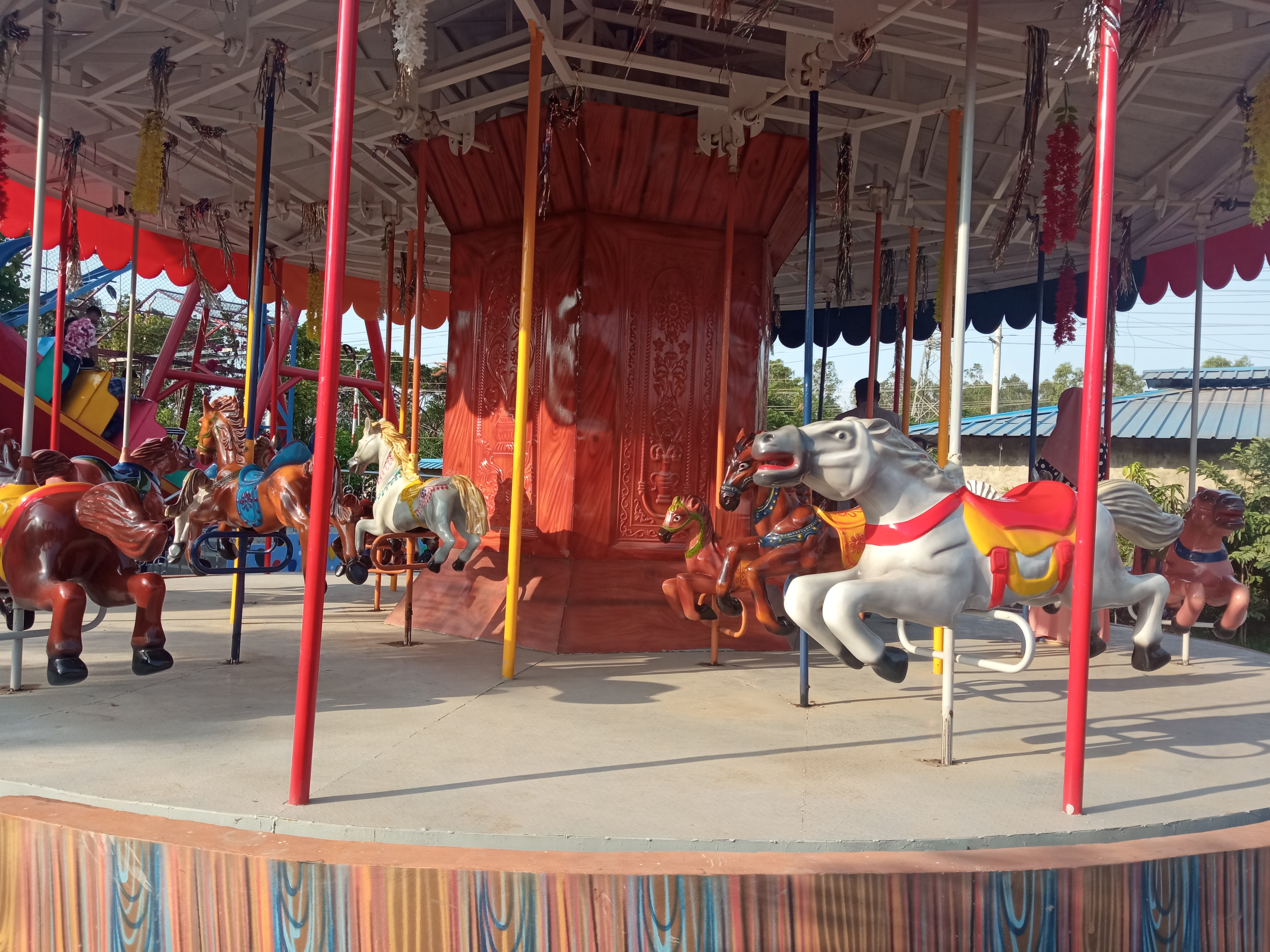
Merry-go-round
