= Khoiyachora Waterfall =

Waterfall in Chittagong, Bangladesh

- খৈয়াছড়া ঝর্ণা
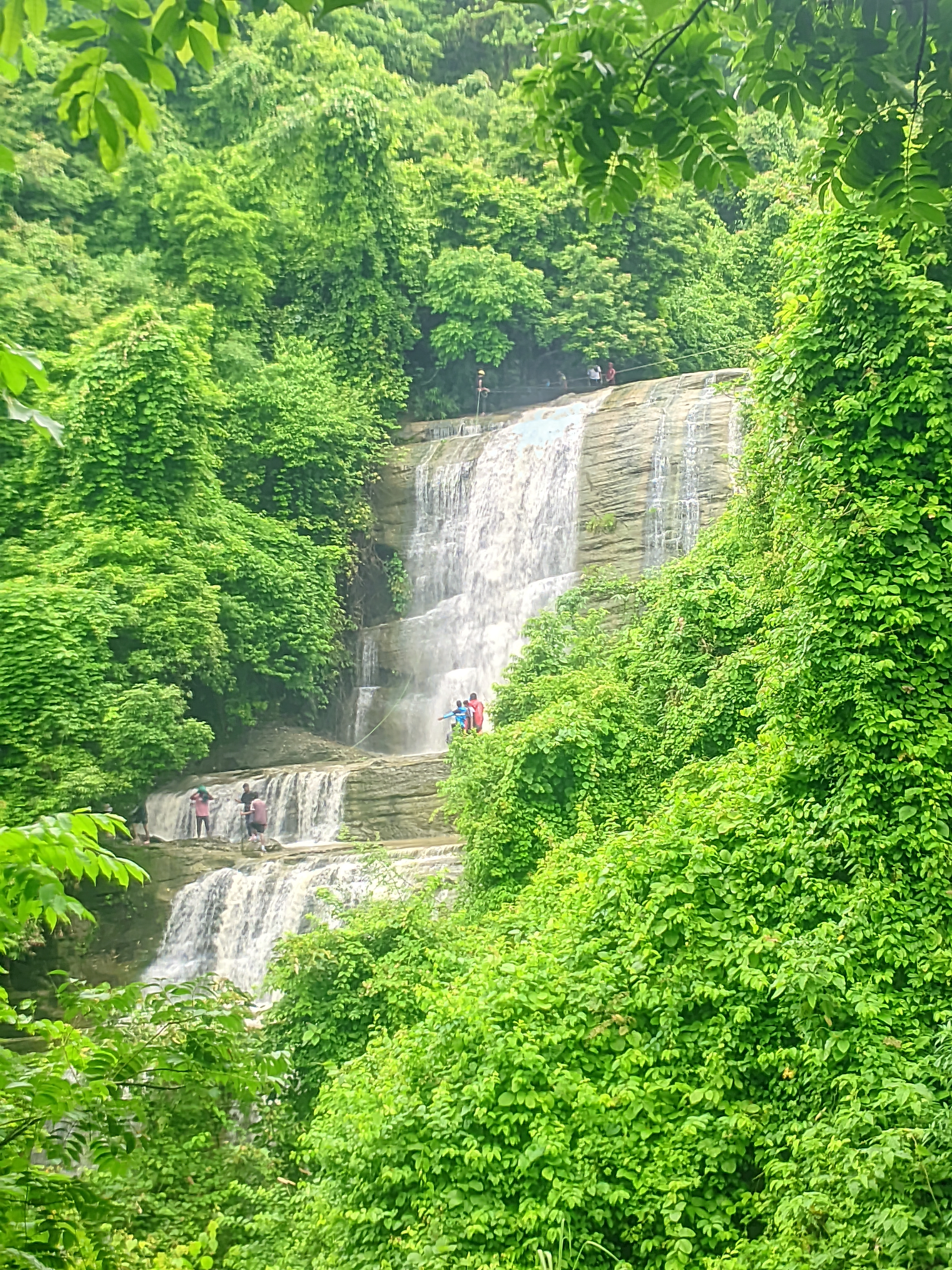

- Location within Bangladesh
- Location: Location in Bangladesh
- Coordinates: 22°46′10″N 91°36′43″E

Khoiyachora Waterfall is a hilly waterfall which is situated on the hills of Mirsharai Upazila, Chittagong, Bangladesh. Among many other waterfalls in Mirsharai Upazila, Khoiyachora waterfall and its corridor is one of the largest in this hilly belt. The Khoiyachora waterfall has a total of seven major waterfalls (cascade) and many isolated steps. Since the location of the fountain is in Khoiyachora union of Mirsharai Upazila, the waterfall has been named "Khoiyachora Waterfall".

== Location ==
Dhaka-Chittagong highway on the north side of the Baratakia market at the Khaiyachhara Union of Mirsharai Upazila. The location of the waterfall is 4.2 kilometers east of it. Due to the location of the fountain is in the mountains, it is not possible to reach at the top of the fountain directly by using any vehicle. It is possible to reach the village near the fountain using the Dhaka-Chittagong highway or on foot from the side or using local vehicles (e.g. CNG). But there is no arrangement for the rest of the road to reach the main stream of the fountain in the foothills of the hill, it is possible to reach there on foot only.

== History ==
It is believed that the Khoiyachora Waterfalls, which is flowing almost 50 years ago. It took time to discover its location for massless mountain areas and bushes. Again many people think that this fountain was created due to hilly diversions almost 50 years ago, before that there was no waterfall.

In 2010, the Government has been included in the Khoiyachora Waterfall National Park, after declaring 293.61 hectares of the block of Kunda Hat (Baratakia) block in the Baraiyadhala Block National Park.

On behalf of the Government of the People's Republic of Bangladesh in 2017, the eco-tourism development project has been undertaken by the Department of Forest Department of Chittagong, "Ramgarh-Sitakunda-Reserve Forest", Khoiyachora Fountain, one of the main objectives is the conservation of the Khoiyachora Waterfall.

== Gallery ==
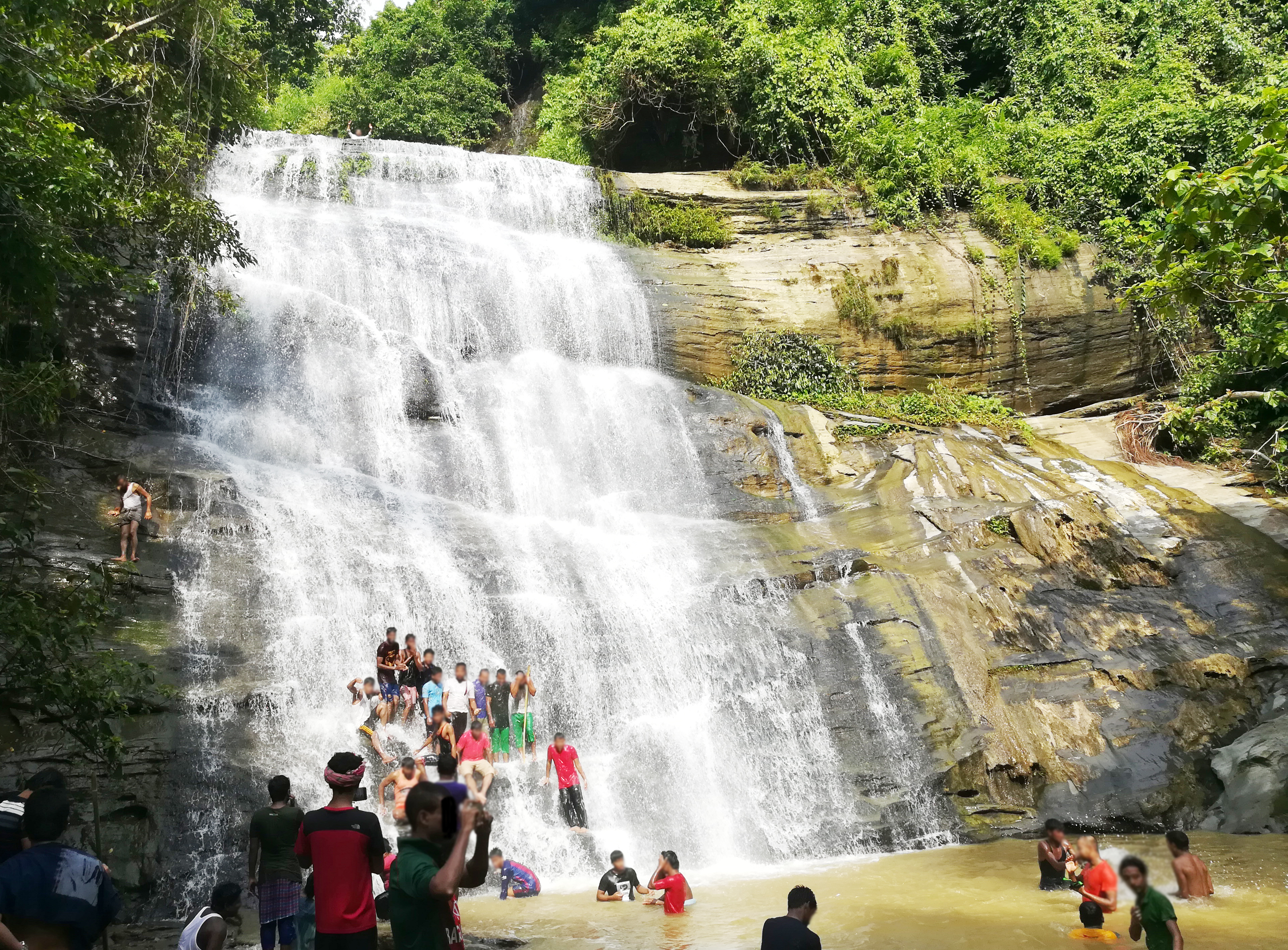
Second Cascade of Khoiyachora Waterfall

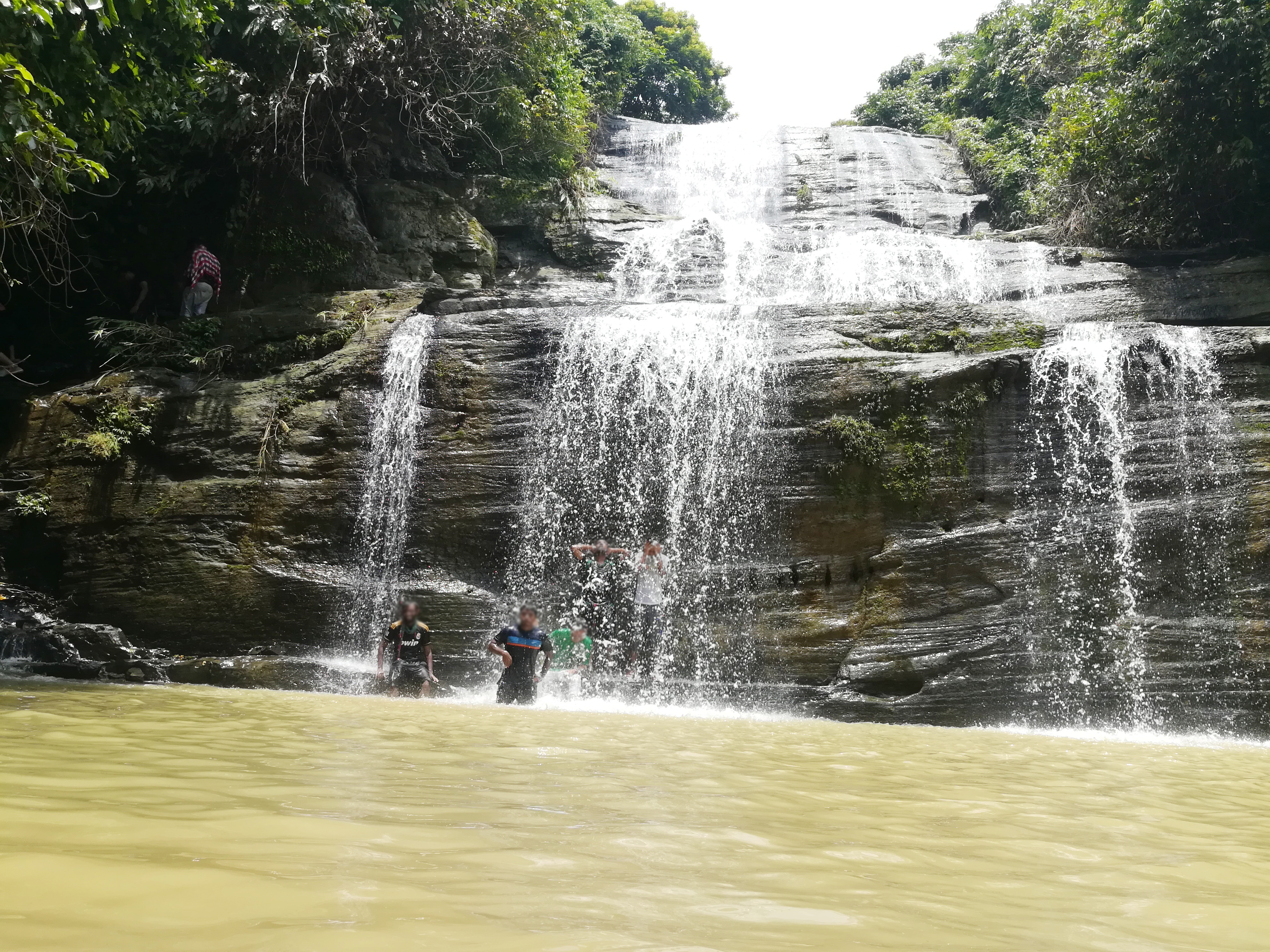
Third, Fourth & Fifth Cascade of Khoiyachora Waterfall

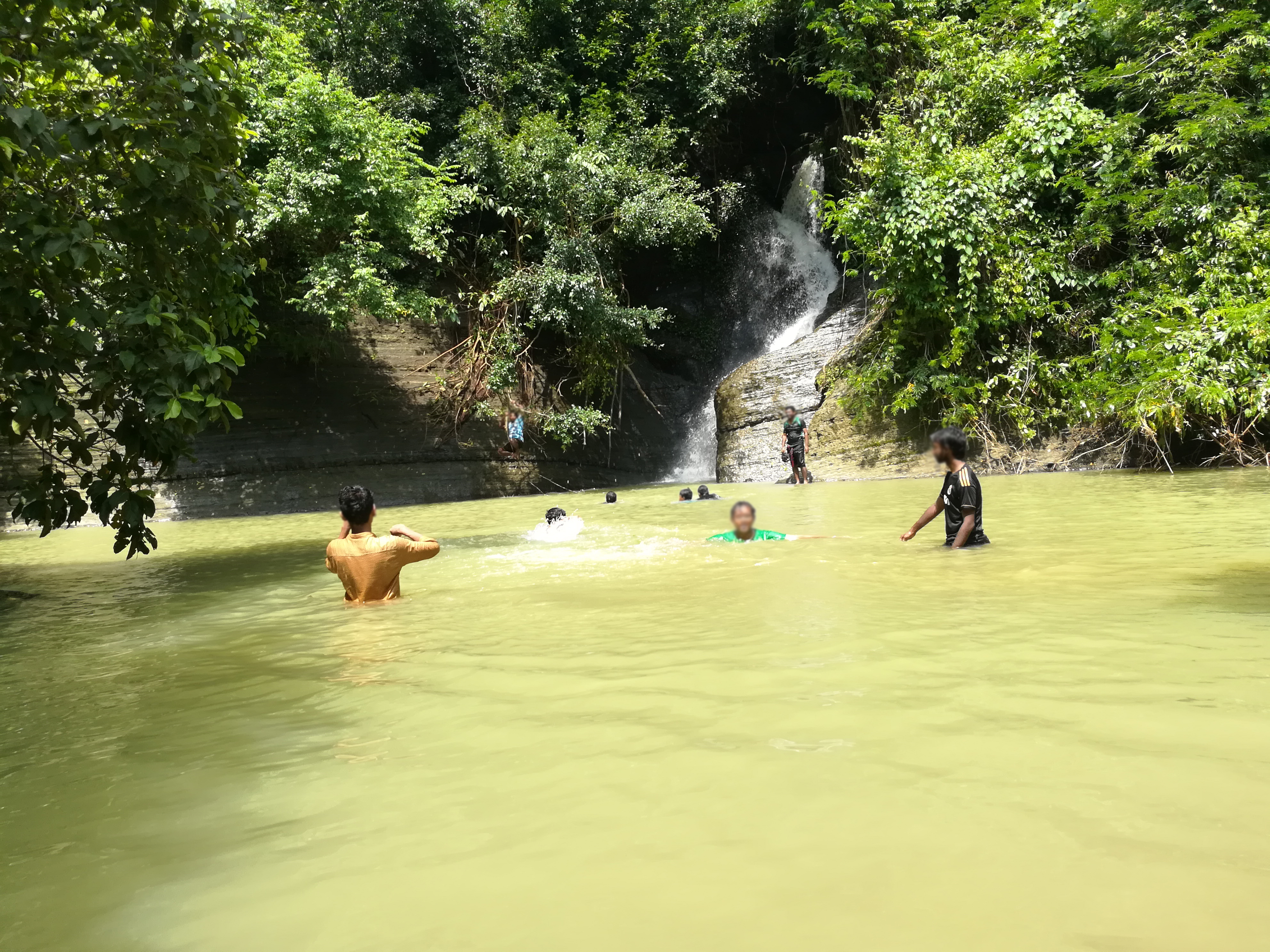
Khoiyachora Waterfalls Source Waterfalls

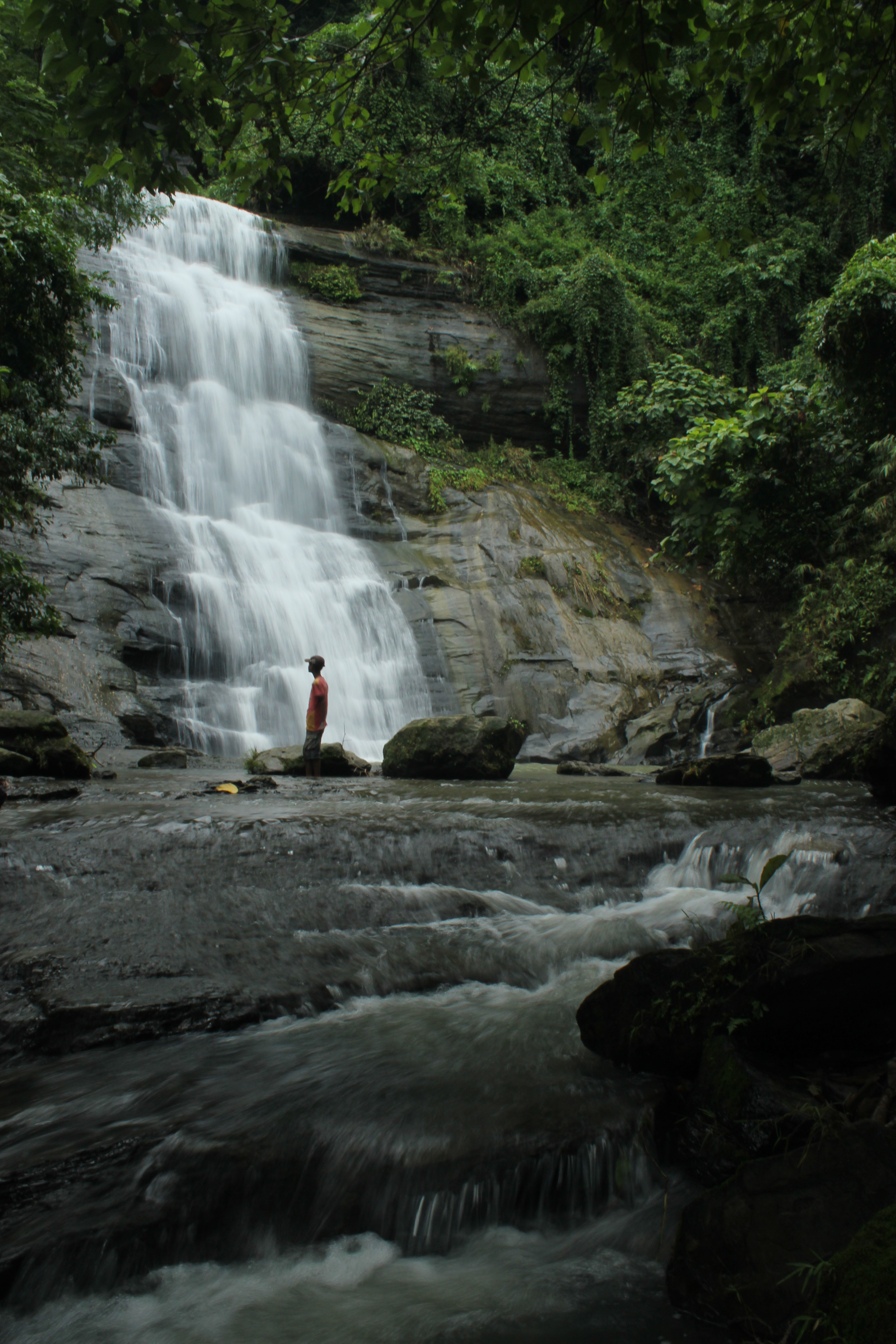

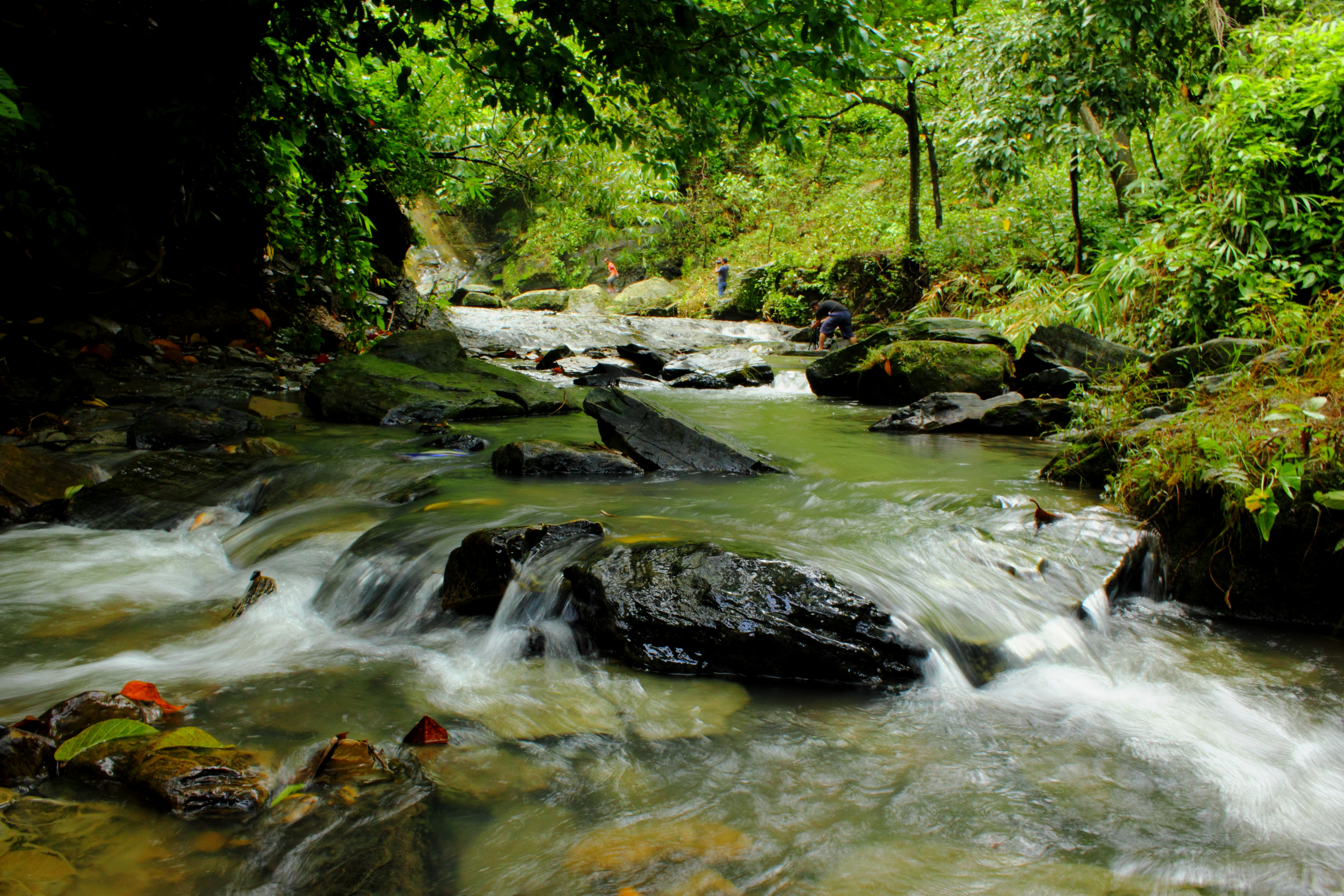

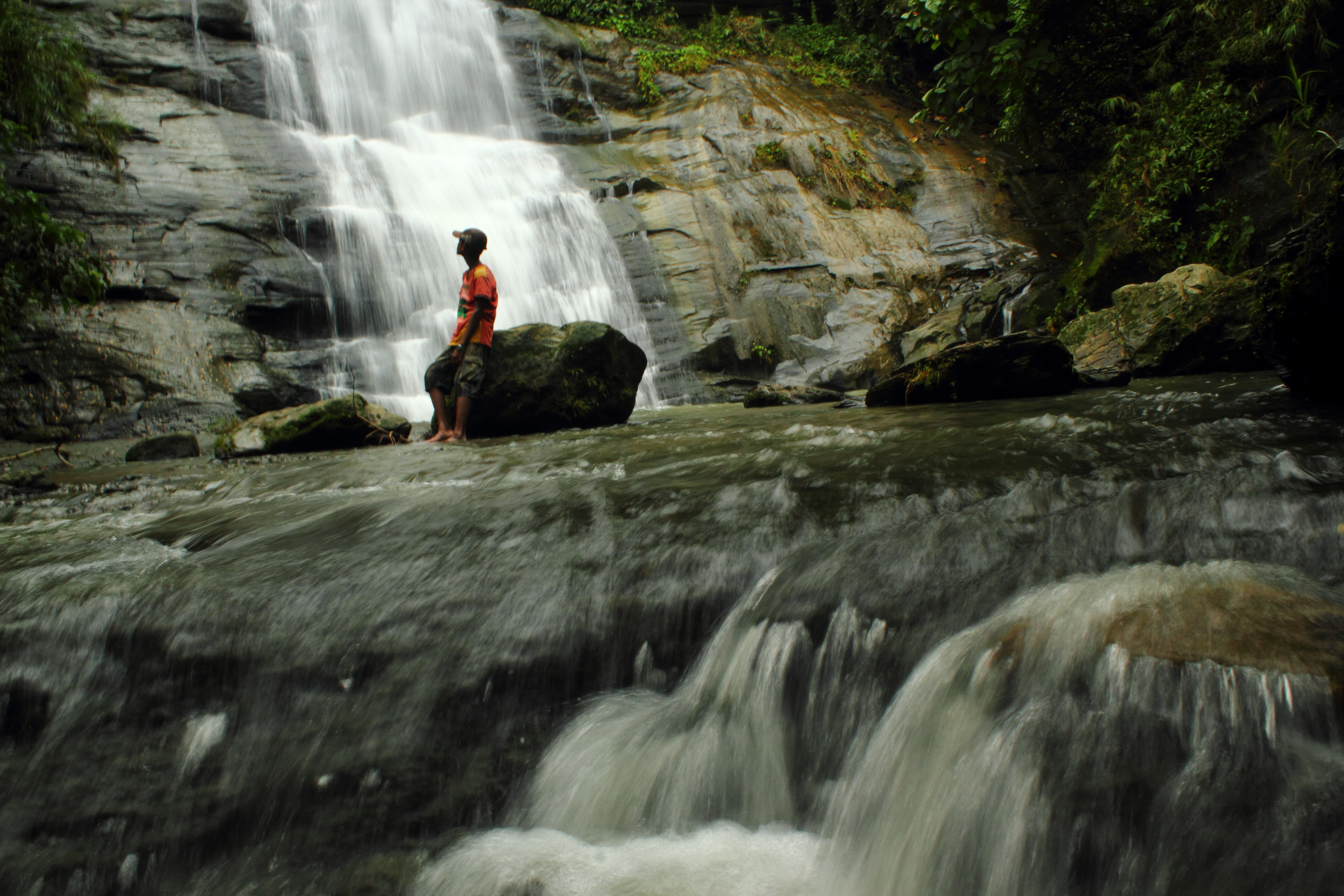

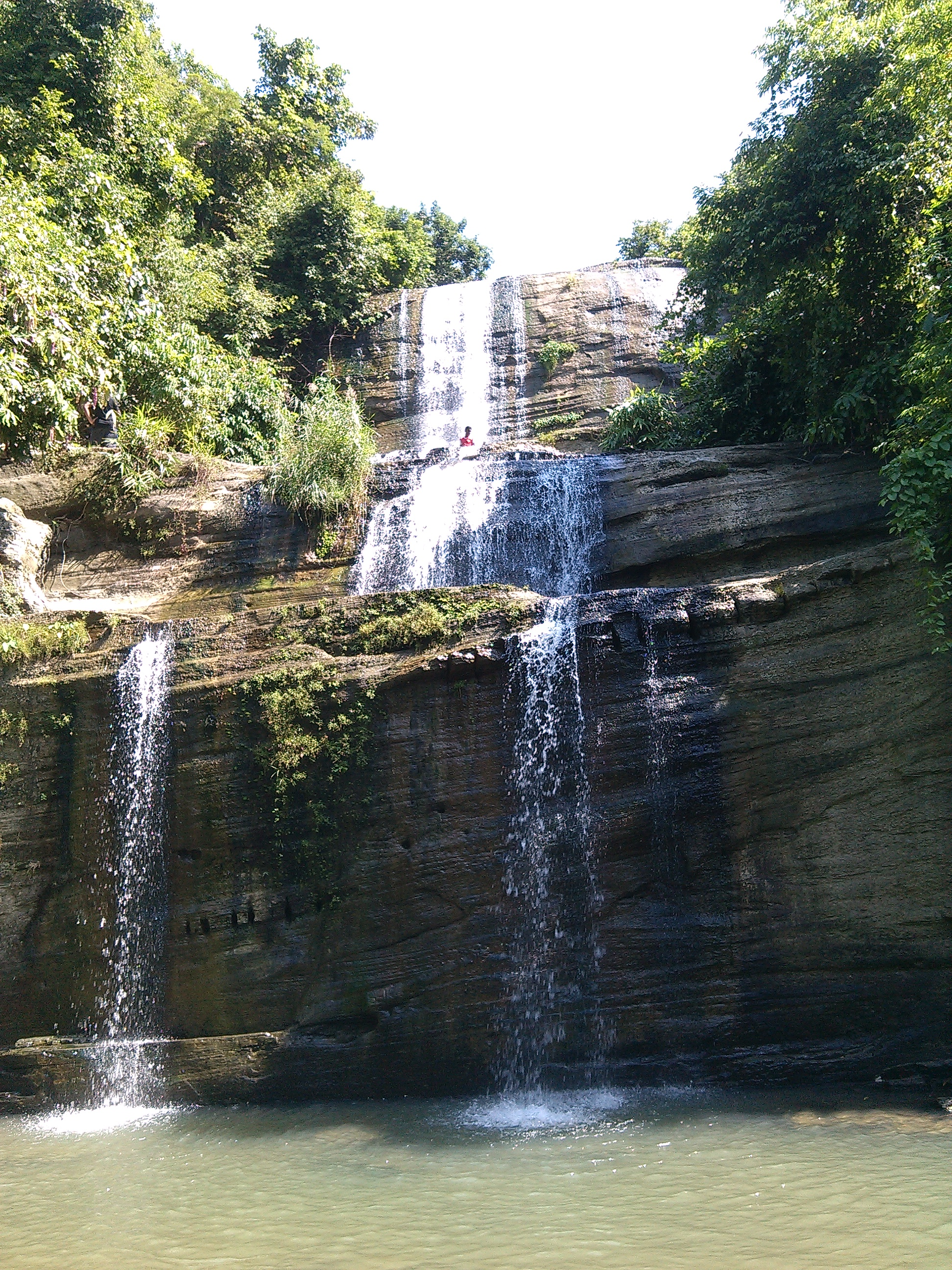

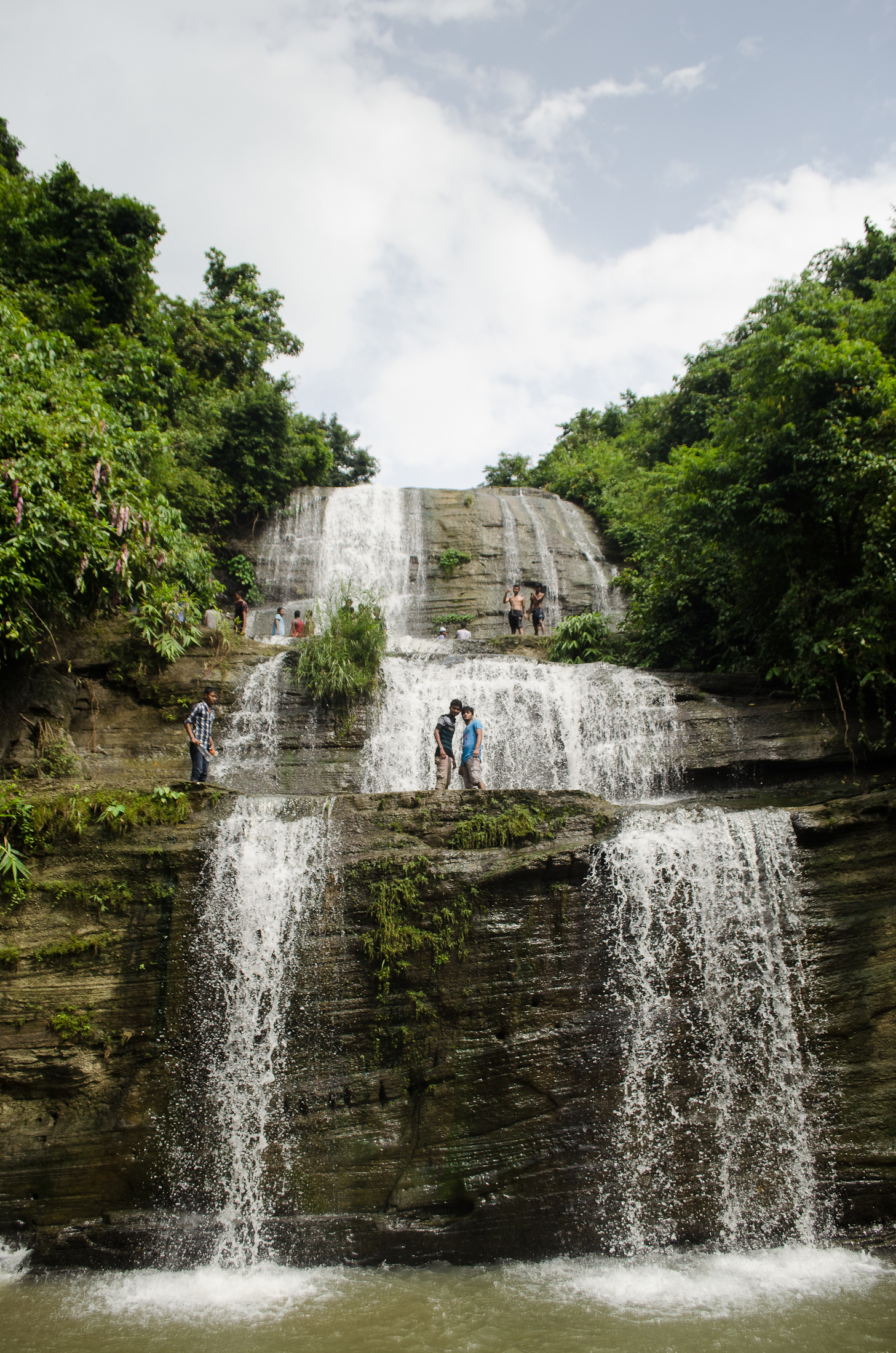
