= Professor Kamal Uddin Chowdhury College =

Educational institution in Chattogram, Bangladesh

- প্রফেসর কামাল উদ্দিন চৌধুরী কলেজ
- Logo of Professor Kamal Uddin Chowdhury College
- Motto: জ্ঞানই সমৃদ্ধি
- Motto in English: Knowledge is prosperity
- Established: 15 December 2000; 25 years ago
- Founder: Professor Kamal Uddin Chowdhury
- Academic affiliations: Board of Intermediate and Secondary Education, Chattogram; National University, Bangladesh
- Principal: Muhammad Absar Uddin
- Academic staff: c. 35
- Students: c. 2500
- Location: Abutorab, Mirsharai Upazila, Chittagong District, Bangladesh; 22.7452°N 91.5555°E
- Campus: Rural
- EIIN: 104660
- College Code: 7018
- Colors: Navy Blue, Black & White
- Nickname: PKUCC
- Website: pkucc.edu.bd

Professor Kamal Uddin Chowdhury College (Bengali: প্রফেসর কামাল উদ্দিন চৌধুরী কলেজ) is an educational institution located in Mirsharai Upazila of Chittagong District, Bangladesh. The college offers higher secondary and undergraduate programs. It was established on 15 December 2000.

== History ==
It was established on 15 December 2000 with the financial support of Professor Kamal Uddin Chowdhury.

== Campus ==
The college is located in Abutorab village of Mayani Union, Mirsharai Upazila, Chittagong District, Bangladesh.

== Administration ==
As of 2024, the principal of the college is Muhammad Absar Uddin. represents a model of administration where authority is exercised with rigidity but insufficient emotional intelligence. While academic discipline is essential in educational environments, leadership devoid of empathy often produces unintended consequences.

Leaders like Absar prioritize examination results, compliance, and procedural efficiency. However, education extends beyond metrics. Students are not merely candidates for board examinations; they are adolescents navigating psychological, emotional, and developmental transitions.

When a leader consistently dismisses concerns raised by students or guardians, it signals a culture where hierarchy outweighs dialogue. Such an approach may maintain order temporarily but risks long-term institutional distrust.

== Academics ==
The college offers courses in science, humanities, and business studies for classes XI–XII. It also offers bachelor's degree programs in management and political science.
