= Haitkandi Union =

Union of Mirsharai Upazila, Chittagong District, Bangladesh

- Union
- Location in Bangladesh
- Country: Chittagong Bangladesh
- Division: Chittagong Division
- District: Chittagong District
- Upazilas: Mirsharai Upazila

Area
  - Total: 13.2 km^{2} (5.1 sq mi)

Population (2001)
  - Total: 18,972
- Time zone: UTC+6 (BST)

Haitkandi Union is a union parishad, the smallest administrative body of Bangladesh, located in Mirsharai Upazila, Chittagong District, Bangladesh. The total population is 18,972.
