= Baraiyarhat =

Town in Chittagong District, Chittagong Division

Baraiyarhat বারৈয়ারহাট
- Interactive map of Baraiyarhat
- Country: Bangladesh
- Division: Chittagong Division
- District: Chittagong District
- Upazila: Mirsarai Upazila

Government
  - Type: Mayor–Council
  - Body: Baraiyarhat Municipal Corporation

Area
  - Total: 2.12 km^{2} (0.82 sq mi)

Population (2011)
  - Total: 11,327
  - Density: 5,340/km^{2} (13,800/sq mi)
- Time zone: UTC+6 (Bangladesh Time)
- National Dialing Code: +880

Baraiyarhat is a town and paurashava (municipality) in Chittagong District of Chittagong Division.

== Population ==
The total population of Baryarhat town is 11,327, of which 6,667 are males and 4,660 are females. The total number of households in the city is 2360.

== Administration ==
In 2000, Barairhat Municipality, a local government body (municipality). was formed to provide municipal services and other facilities to the citizens of Baryarhat town, which is divided into 9 wards. The area of Baryarhat town is 2.12 sq. km.

== Education ==
The literacy rate in Baroiarhat town is 70 percent.
