= Hinguli Union =

Union of Mirsharai Upazila, Chittagong District, Bangladesh

- Union
- Location in Bangladesh
- Country: Chittagong Bangladesh
- Division: Chittagong Division
- District: Chittagong District
- Upazilas: Mirsharai Upazila

Area
  - Total: 18.5 km^{2} (7.1 sq mi)

Population (2001)
  - Total: 25,507
- Time zone: UTC+6 (BST)

Hinguli Union is a union, the smallest administrative body of Bangladesh, located in Mirsharai Upazila, Chittagong District, Bangladesh. The total population is 25,507.
