= Mahamaya Chhara Irrigation Extension Project =

Mahamaya Lake
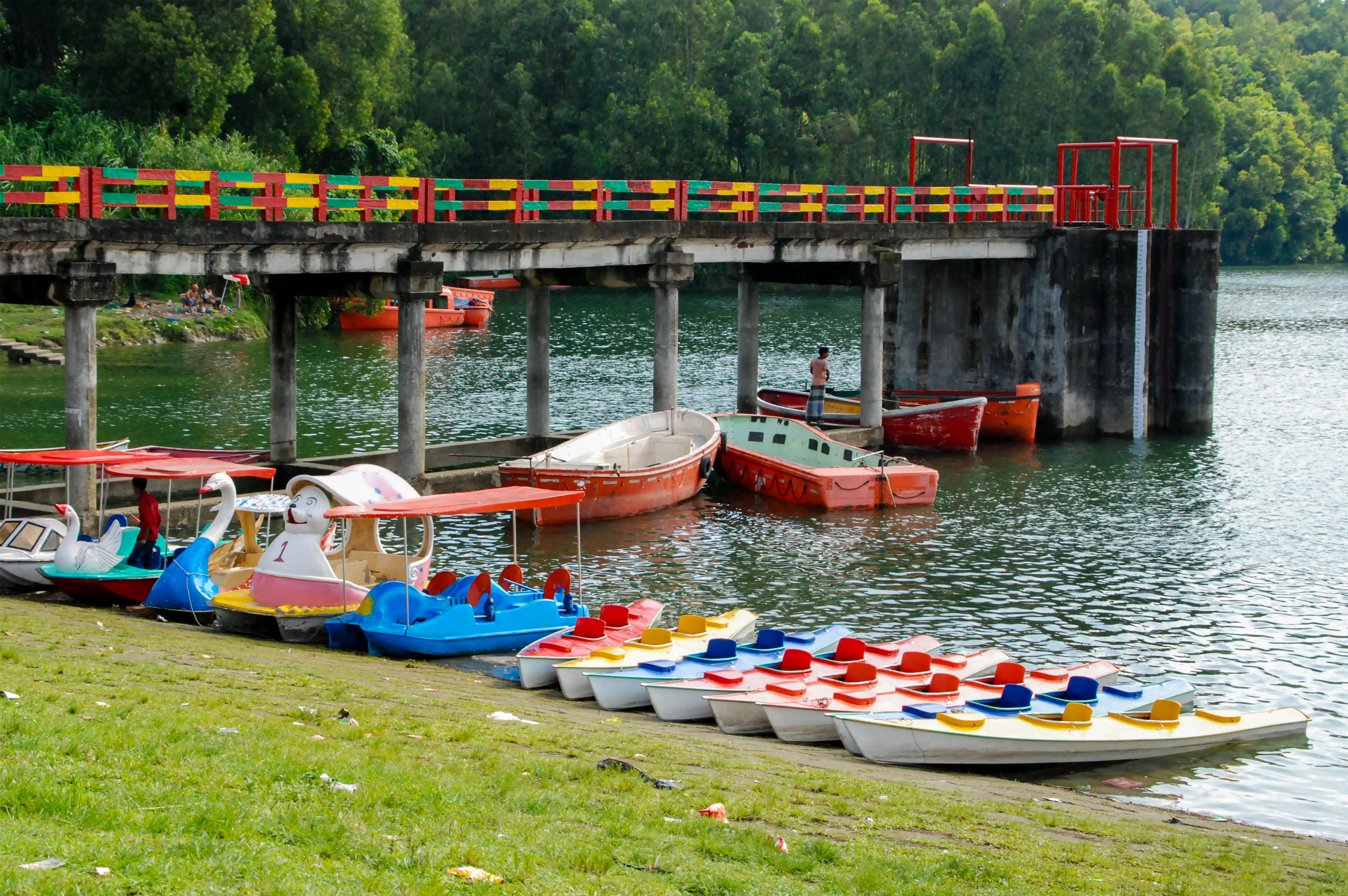
- Recreational boats by dam regulator structure

- Location within Bangladesh
- Location: South-Eastern Bangladesh
- Coordinates: 22.8168°N 91.5719°E
- Type: reservoir
- Catchment area: 3,360 ha (8,300 acres)
- Basin countries: Bangladesh

Mohamaya Lake's Timelapse, 2018

Mahamaya Irrigation Project (Bengali: মহামায়া সেচ প্রকল্প) is an irrigation project in Bangladesh situated at Durgapur Union, Mirsharai Upazila, Chittagong. Initiated in the 2007-2008 financial year, the project provides irrigation water to a 3360 hectare area. It cost about 230 million taka and construction was completed in 2009. This project was inaugurated by Prime Minister Sheikh Hasina on 29 December 2010. It is the second largest man made lake in Bangladesh after Kaptai Lake.

The project also provided recreational areas.

Government is also planning to install a 50 kW mini hydro electric powerplant here.

== Gallery ==
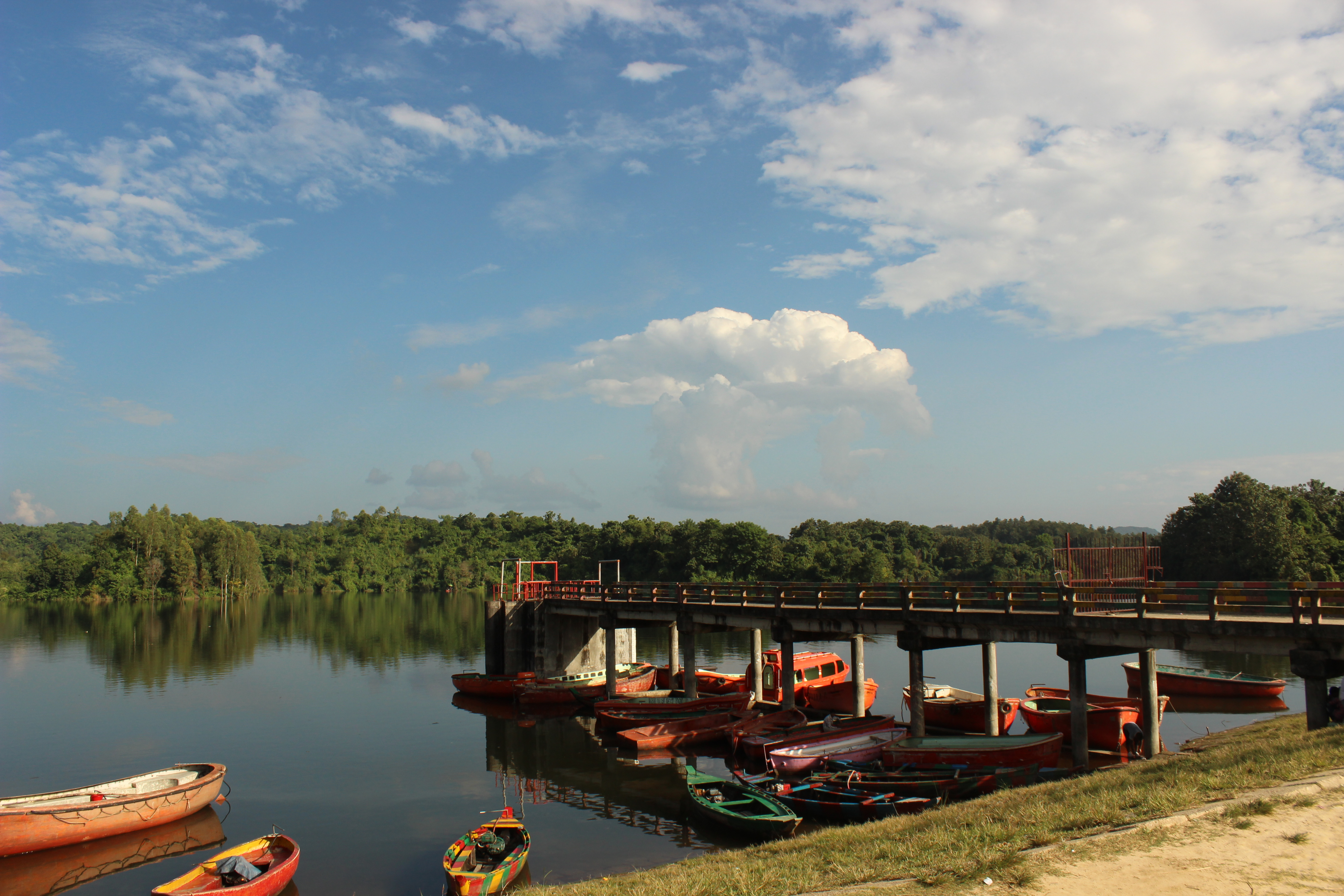
Irrigation Dam Bridge

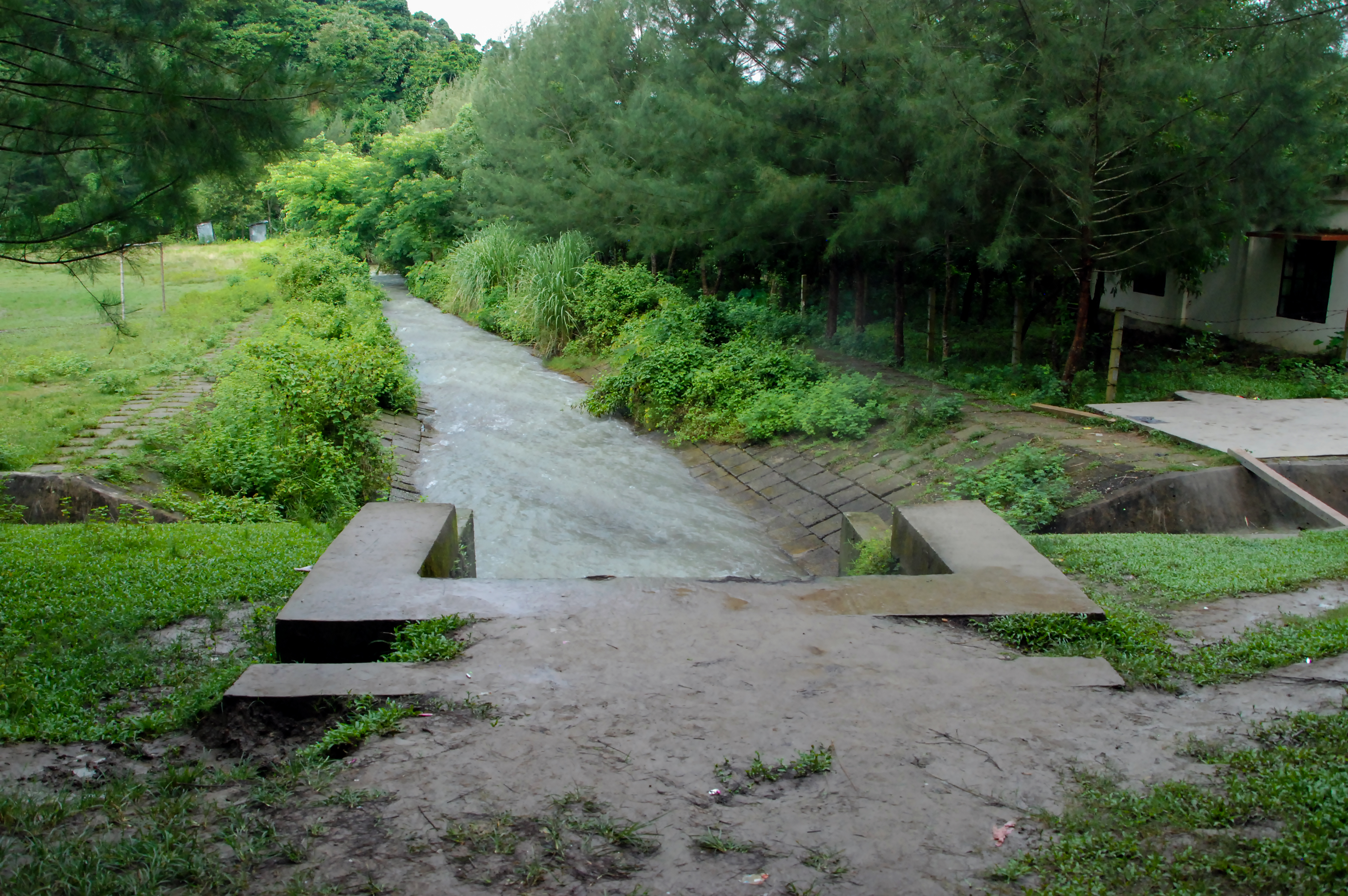
Irrigation Dam Canal

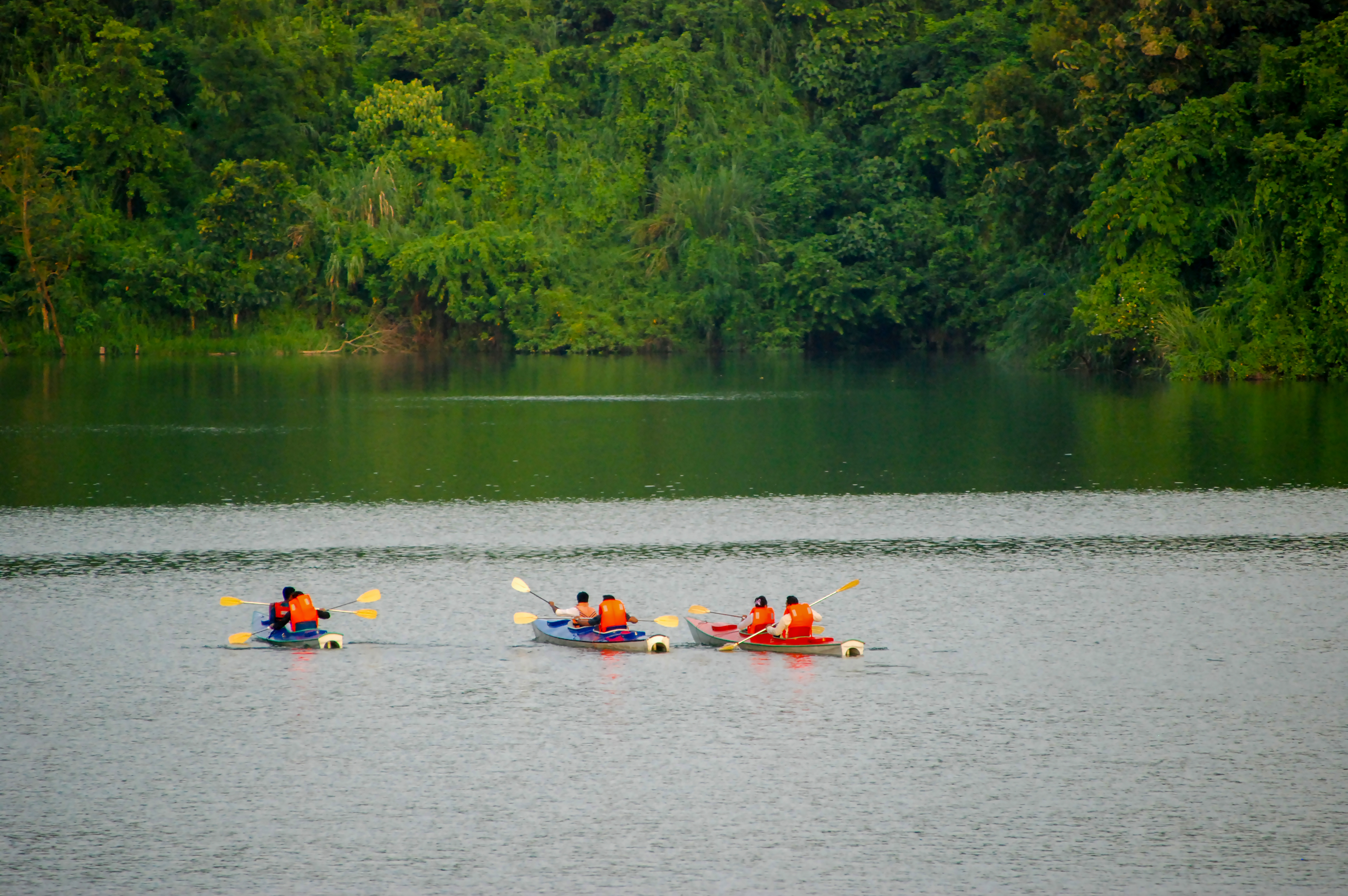
Kayaking at Lake

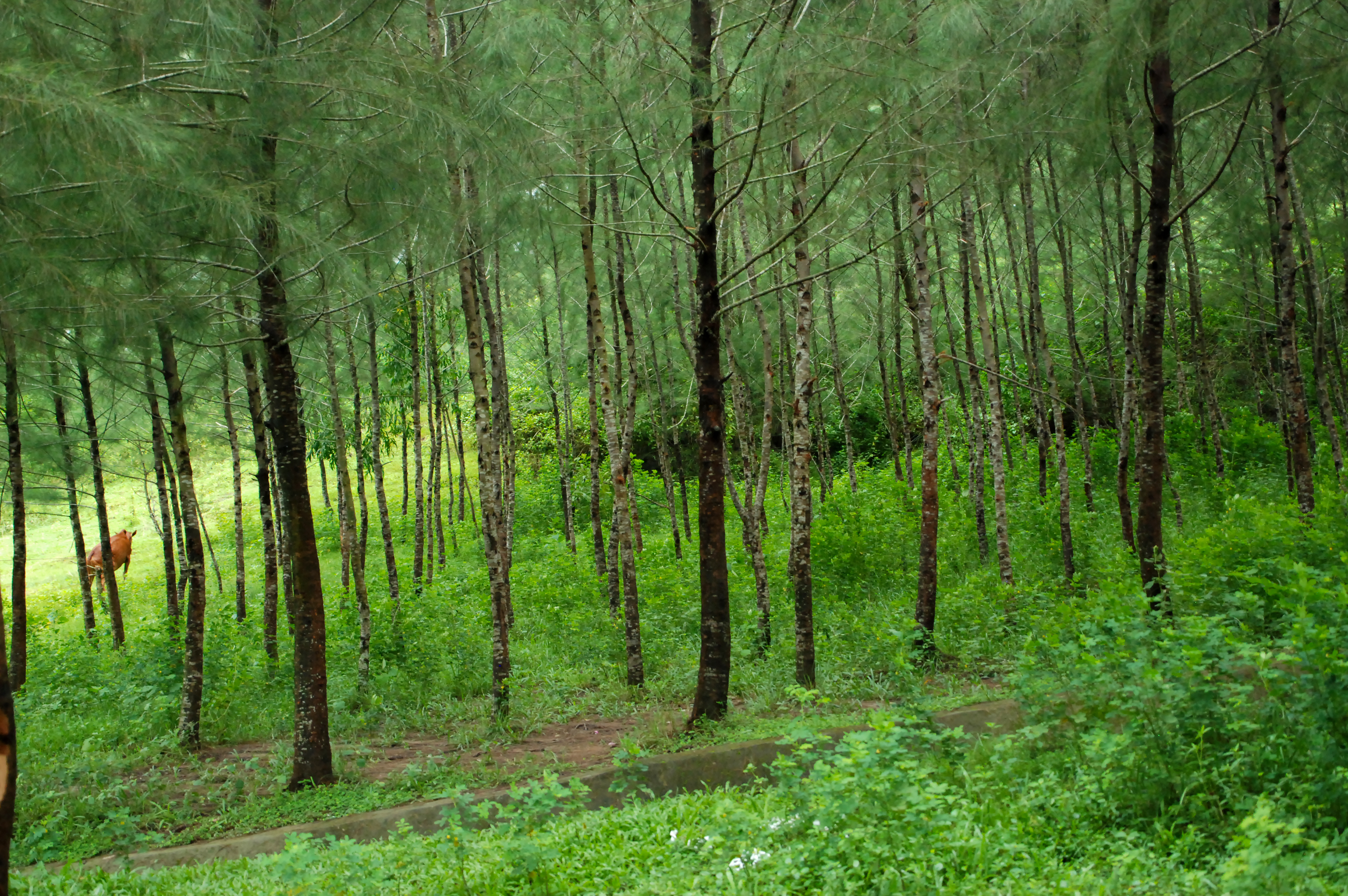
Casuarina equisetifolia
