= Nizampur Government College =

Educational institution in Chattogram, Bangladesh

- নিজামপুর সরকারি কলেজ
- Logo of Nizampur Government College
- Type: Government College
- Established: 30 June 1964; 62 years ago
- Academic affiliations: Board of Intermediate and Secondary Education, Chattogram; National University, Bangladesh
- Principal: Professor Ranjit Biswas
- Academic staff: c. 49
- Students: c. 3500
- Location: Nizampur, Mirsharai Upazila, Bangladesh; 22.7195°N 91.6032°E
- Campus: 8.5 acres (3.4 ha); Urban
- EIIN: 104662
- Colors: White
- Nickname: NGC
- Website: www.nizampurcollege.edu.bd

Nizampur Government College (Bengali: নিজামপুর সরকারি কলেজ) is an educational institution located in Mirsharai Upazila of Chittagong District, Bangladesh. The college offers higher secondary and graduate classes. The college was established on 30 June 1964.

== History ==
Nizampur Government College was established on 30 June 1964 by residents concerned about providing higher education opportunities for local students. The institution is managed by a 15-member board of directors led by MDM Jalal Uddin Chowdhury.

== Infrastructure ==
The infrastructure of this college is conventional. It is located on the west side of the Dhaka-Chittagong highway. The main buildings of this college are built on around 3 acres of land. The total area of the Nizampur Govt College campus is around 8.25 acres. A total of 4 buildings in this college with conventional teaching facilities.
