= Mirsarai Tragedy =

Bus crash in Bangladesh on July 11, 2011

Details
- Date: 11 July 2011; 15 years ago
- Location: Beside Soidaali area of Baratakia-Abutorab road, Mirsarai Upazila, Chattogram
- Country: Bangladesh

Statistics
- Deaths: 45

At least 45 people, including 42 students, were killed when a pick-up truck carrying them veered off the road and plunged into a roadside ditch at Mayani area of Mirsarai Upazila in Bangladesh on July 11, 2011.

This is the largest number of students killed in a single incident in the history of Bangladesh since independence in 1971.

The local administration initially announced the number of death toll as 45.

The students, mostly from Abu Torab High School, Abu Torab Primary School and Abu Torab Fazil Madrasha, were returning home after watching a football match when the accident, one of the worst in recent years, took place.

Jafar Sadek, headmaster of the Abu Torab High School, told reporters that 28 of the deceased were students of his school, and adding that several were very talented.

The truck driver was reportedly running the vehicle recklessly and talking over a mobile phone just before the accident.

The Prime Minister Sheikh Hasina, leader of the opposition in parliament Begum Khaleda Zia, former president B. Chowdhury, education minister Nurul Islam Nahid, primary and mass education minister Afsarul Amin Chowdhury, communications minister Abul Hossain and industries minister Dilip Barua visited the area to console the bereaved family members.

The educational institutions across the country observed mourning day on July 13 in remembrance of the deceased students while the educational institutions at the upazila observed a three-day mourning programme from July 12.
