= Jorarganj Union =

Union of Mirsharai Upazila, Chittagong District, Bangladesh

Jorarganj
- Union
- Location in Bangladesh
- Country: Bangladesh
- Division: Chittagong Division
- District: Chittagong District
- Upazilas: Mirsharai Upazila

Area
  - Total: 22.34 km^{2} (8.63 sq mi)

Population (2010)
  - Total: 35,862
- Time zone: UTC+6 (BST)
- Website: jorarganjup.chittagong.gov.bd

Jorarganj Union is a union, the smallest administrative body of Bangladesh, located in Mirsharai Upazila, Chittagong District, Bangladesh. The union has an area of 22.34 square kilometres and as of 2010 had a population of 35,862.
