= Ichhakhali Union =

Union of Mirsharai Upazila, Chittagong District, Bangladesh

Ichhakhali Union ইছাখালী ইউনিয়ন
- Union
- Location in Bangladesh
- Country: Chittagong Bangladesh
- Division: Chittagong Division
- District: Chittagong District
- Upazilas: Mirsharai Upazila

Area
  - Total: 45.9 km^{2} (17.7 sq mi)

Population (2001)
  - Total: 25,551
- Time zone: UTC+6 (BST)

Ichhakhali Union is a union parishad, the smallest administrative body of Bangladesh, located in Mirsharai Upazila, Chittagong District, Bangladesh. As of 2001, the total population was 25,551.
