= Mirsharai Upazila =

Upazila in Chattogram Division, Bangladesh

Mirsharai মীরসরাই
- Upazila
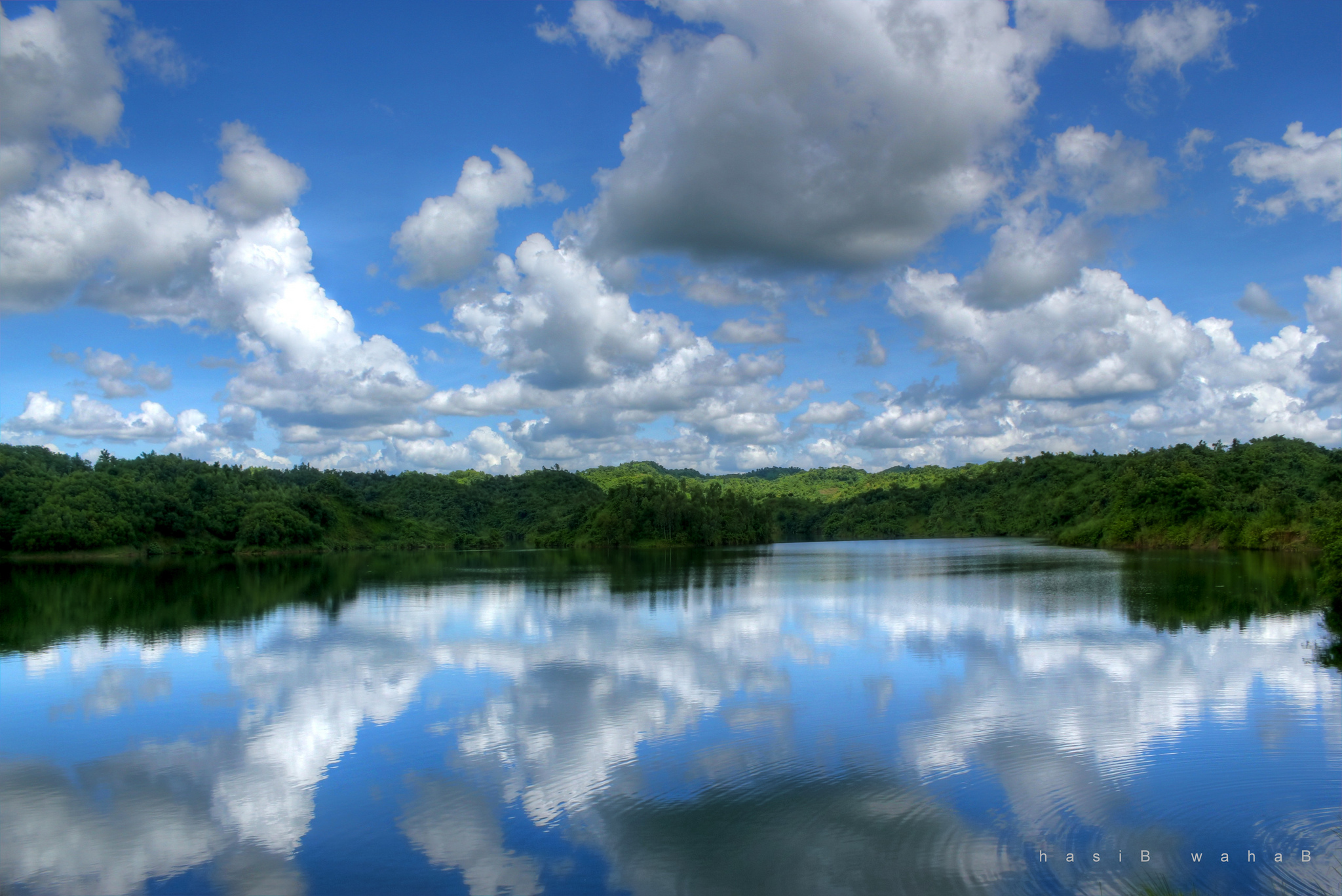
- Mahamaya Lake

- Mirsarai Upazila on the map
- Coordinates: 22°46.3′N 91°34.5′E
- Country: Bangladesh
- Division: Chittagong
- District: Chittagong
- Jatiya Sangsad constituency: Chittagong-1
- Establishment: 1917 (109 years ago)
- Headquarters: Mirsharai

Government
  - Body: Upazila Council
  - MP: Nurul Amin
  - Chairman: Vacant
  - Chief Executive Officer: Mohammad Zahidul Islam

Area
  - Total: 482.88 km^{2} (186.44 sq mi)

Population (2022)
  - Total: 472,794
  - Density: 979.11/km^{2} (2,535.9/sq mi)
- Time zone: UTC+6 (BST)
- Post code: 4320
- Area code: 03024
- Website: mirsharai.gov.bd

Mirsharai Upazila mauza geocode map

Mirsharai Upazila (Bengali: মীরসরাই উপজেলা) is an upazila of Chittagong District in Chittagong Division, Bangladesh. It comprises two police stations (Jorargonj and Mirsharai) and two municipalities (Baraiyarhat and Mirsharai).

== History ==
Sultan Fakhruddin Mobarak Shah conquered Chittagong in 1340 AD and established Muslim rule in this region. During the reign of Sultans Hussain Shah and Nusrat Shah, Paragal Khan and Chhuti Khan were the rulers of this area. Subsequently, Nizam Shah, brother of emperor Sher Shah, was the ruler of this area. Nizampur Pargana is named after Nizam Shah and the whole area of Mirsharai came under the control of this pargana.

From the beginning of the 16th century the region was very rich in Bangla literature. Most of the time between 1580 and 1666, the region was under the control of the Arakanese.

The place within the current Mirsharai thana where Buzurg Umed Khan, son of Subadar Shaista Khan, landed after crossing the Feni River was named as Buzurg Umedpur. With the conquest of Chittagong by Khan in 1666, the region came permanently under Mughal rule.

Towards the end of British rule in India, the Durgapur and Karerhat areas of Mirsharai were the centres of revolutionary activities of Chittagong. A fierce battle was fought between the freedom fighters (under Captain Wali Ahmed) and the Pak Army near the Fenafuni Bridge on the south of Mirsharai sadar, in which about 100 Pak soldiers were killed. The two sides also fought at places including Shuvapur Bridge, Hinguli Bridge, Aochi Mia Bridge and Mostan Nagar.

== History and landmarks ==
=== Bengal Sultanate era ===
During the 16th century, Paragalpur served as the military and administrative headquarters for Paragal Khan, a commander under the Bengal Sultanate. The village contains the Paragaler Dighi, a water reservoir measuring 437.39 by 271.58 metres (1,435.0 ft × 891.0 ft) and covering an area of approximately 29.6 acres (12.0 ha). It is documented as the second-largest reservoir excavated during the independent Sultanate of Bengal. The structural remains of the 16th-century Paragal Khan Mosque lie on the reservoir's eastern bank.

In the neighboring village of Dewanpur, architectural remnants—including sandstone fragments—remain from a mosque constructed by Paragal Khan's son, Chhuti Khan, situated adjacent to a modern mosque built over the original foundation.

=== Other religious sites ===
Historic Islamic structures in the upazila include the Nai Duari Mosque, the Daulat Bibi Mosque, and the Mahadia Mosque. Prominent Hindu religious sites in the area include the Jagannath Mandir at Abu Torab Bazar and the Kali Mandir at Karerhat.

== Geography ==
Mirsharai is located at 22.7722°N 91.5750°E. It has 79,545 households and a total area of 482.88 km^{2}.

== Hydrology ==
The Feni River serves as the main river of Mirsharai Upazila, while the Sandwip Channel of the Bay of Bengal forms its southern maritime border. The upazila is intersected by several major canals, including the Isakhali, Mahamaya, Domkhali, Hinguli, and Mayani canals.

== Demographics ==
Religions in Mirsharai Upazila (2022)
Religion	Percent
Islam	86.77%
Hinduism	11.92%
Buddhism	1.24%
Other or not stated	0.07%

According to the 2022 Bangladeshi census, Mirsarai Upazila had 111,009 households and a population of 472,794. 9.66% of the population were under 5 years of age. Mirsarai had a literacy rate (age 7 and over) of 79.61%: 82.35% for males and 77.10% for females, and a sex ratio of 93.39 males for every 100 females. 90,260 (19.09%) lived in urban areas. Ethnic population was 3,660 (0.77%), of which Tripura were 2,264.

As of the 2011 Census of Bangladesh, Mirsharai upazila had 79,545 households and a population of 398,716. 88,008 (22.07%) were under 10 years of age. Mirsharai had an average literacy rate of 55.08%, compared to the national average of 51.8%, and a sex ratio of 1128 females per 1000 males. 31,206 (7.83%) of the population lived in urban areas. Ethnic population was 2,266 (0.57%), of which Tripura were 2,242.

In the 1991 census in Bangladesh, Mirsharai had a population of 325712. Males constituted 49.97% of the population, and females 50.03%. This Upazila's eighteen up population is 160,496. Mirsharai has an average literacy rate of 37.2% (7+ years), and the national average of 32.4% literate.

== Administration ==
Mirsharai Upazila is divided into Baraiyarhat Municipality, Mirsharai Municipality, and sixteen union councils. The union councils are further subdivided into 113 mauzas and 208 villages. The administrative activities of these unions are divided between two police stations (thanas): Mirsharai Thana and Jorarganj Thana.

Baraiyarhat Municipality and 8 union councils under Jorarganj Thana

- 1 No. Karerhat
- 2 No. Hinguli
- 3 No. Jorarganj
- 4 No. Dhum
- 5 No. Osmanpur
- 6 No. Ichhakhali
- 7 No. Katachhara
- 8 No. Durgapur

Mirsharai Municipality and 8 union councils under Mirsharai Thana

- 9 No. Mirsharai
- 10 No. Mithanala
- 11 No. Maghadia
- 12 No. Khaiyachhara
- 13 No. Mayani
- 14 No. Haitkandi
- 15 No. Wahedpur
- 16 No. Saherkhali

Baraiyarhat Municipality and Mirsharai Municipality are each subdivided into 9 wards.

Mahboob Rahman Ruhel was the last member of parliament, elected at 2024 national parliamentary election.

== Economy ==
Part of the National Special Economic Zone — Bangladesh's largest special economic zone, with a total land area of 33,805 acres (136.86 km²) spanning Mirsharai, Sitakunda, and Sonagazi upazilas — is located within Mirsharai Upazila. The zone was established under BEZA and was originally named Bangabandhu Sheikh Mujib Shilpa Nagar before being renamed in November 2024. As of February 2026, around 15 industrial units were operating within the zone, with roughly 20 more under construction.

== Environmental and social impact ==
The development of the National Special Economic Zone within Mirsharai Upazila has drawn sustained scrutiny over deforestation and its effect on local communities. According to an investigation by The Climate Watch, more than 55 million trees were cleared between 2015 and 2025 to build the zone, including 22,335 acres of government-classified "reserved forest" and 853 acres of coastal mangroves that had been planted by the Forest Department between 1967 and 2014 as a cyclone and storm-surge barrier for the surrounding coast.

Forest Department officials, including the Divisional Forest Officer and Chief Conservator of Forests, formally objected to the project before it began, citing a 2013 Supreme Court directive against leasing notified forest land for non-forestry use; these objections were not acted upon, and the project proceeded as a "Prime Minister's Special Project" under the government of Sheikh Hasina. Following a change of government in August 2024, documents obtained under Bangladesh's Right to Information Act by The Climate Watch indicated that roughly 10% of Chattogram District's total reserved forest, and about 50% of Mirsharai Upazila's forest cover, had been cleared for the project.

A baseline biodiversity survey cited in the report found the affected forest had supported over 5,000 spotted deer along with populations of frogs, turtles, snakes, and dozens of native and migratory bird species. Researchers and local sources quoted in the investigation said the spotted deer population fell to an estimated 2,000 individuals amid habitat loss, starvation, poaching, and vehicle collisions, and that other species including foxes, monitor lizards, and slow lorises had substantially declined or disappeared from the area. The former chairman of BEZA acknowledged in the report that grazing land for local buffalo and sheep herds had been lost, while a BEZA project director stated that responsibility for clearing trees on allocated land rested with the leasing companies.

The report also documented economic effects on local livelihoods, including crab collectors, sheep herders, and buffalo herders in villages such as Shaherkhali and Ichakhali who said shrinking grazing and foraging land had forced many to abandon traditional occupations. Separately, sand dredging from the Bay of Bengal's Sandwip Channel to fill and raise the zone's low-lying land, and reliance on groundwater extraction due to an unresolved water-supply shortfall, were also reported as ongoing environmental concerns.

In April 2026, the Chattogram Coastal Forest Division formally requested that BEZA return 4,104 acres of forest land within the zone that remained undeveloped, citing its value for carbon absorption and storm protection; as of June 2026, the request was still pending a response.

BEZA has stated that it conducted an Environmental and Social Impact Assessment for the project and has proposed establishing new coastal afforestation along the zone's embankment.

== Education ==
There are four colleges in the upazila. They include Nizampur Government College (1964), Baraiya Hat College (1974), Mirsarai College (1973), and Professor Kamal Uddin Chowdhury College. Nizampur Government College is the only government college in the Upzilla.

According to Banglapedia, Abu Torab High School, founded in 1914, Mirsharai Government Model Pilot High School (1962), Mithachhara High School (1947), Sarkar Hat N. R. High School (1939), and Zorwarganj Model Multilateral High School (1914) are notable secondary schools.

== Upazila Parishad ==
Serial number	Designation	Name
01	Upazila Chairman	vacant
02	Vice Chairman	Vacant
03	Female Vice Chairman	Vacant
04	Upazila Nirbahi Officer	Mohammad Zahidul Islam

List of Upazila Chairman

Serial number	Name of Upazila Chairman	Duration
01	Abu Taher	1985–1986
02	Abul Bashar Bhuiyan	1986–1991
03	Gias Uddin	2009–2014
04	Nurul Amin	2014–2019
05	Jasim Uddin	2019–2024
06	Anayet Hossain Nayon	2024–2024

== Transport ==
Mirsharai is situated along the N1 highway (Dhaka–Chittagong Highway). The Z1021 regional highway (Mirsharai–Narayanhat Road) originates from the N1 at Mirsharai and extends 19.87 kilometres (12.35 mi) east to connect with Regional Highway R151 at Narayanhat in Fatikchhari Upazila.

== Tourist attractions ==
- Muhuri Project
- Komoldoho trail
- Napittachora trail
- Khoiyachora Waterfall
- Arshinagar Future Park
- Mahamaya Chhara Irrigation Extension Project

== See also ==
- Upazilas of Bangladesh
- Districts of Bangladesh
- Divisions of Bangladesh
- Mirsarai Tragedy
