= Saherkhali Union =

Union of Mirsharai Upazila, Chittagong District, Bangladesh

- Union
- Location in Bangladesh
- Coordinates: 22.7124°N 91.5604°E
- Country: Chittagong Bangladesh
- Division: Chittagong Division
- District: Chittagong District
- Upazilas: Mirsharai Upazila

Government
  - Chairman: Kamrul Haidar Chowdhury

Area
  - Total: 64 km^{2} (25 sq mi)

Population (2001)
  - Total: 16,231
- Time zone: UTC+6 (BST)

Saherkhali Union is a union parishad, the smallest administrative body of Bangladesh, located in Mirsharai Upazila, Chittagong District, Bangladesh. The total population is 16,231.
