= Maghadia Union =

Union of Mirsharai Upazila, Chittagong District, Bangladesh

- Union
- Location in Bangladesh
- Country: Chittagong Bangladesh
- Division: Chittagong Division
- District: Chittagong District
- Upazilas: Mirsharai Upazila

Area
  - Total: 14.8 km^{2} (5.7 sq mi)

Population (2001)
  - Total: 22,532
- Time zone: UTC+6 (BST)

Maghadia Union is a union, the smallest administrative body of Bangladesh, located in Mirsharai Upazila, Chittagong District, Bangladesh. The total population as of 2011 was 23,406, representing an increase from the 2001 total of 22,532.
