= Mayani Union =

Union of Mirsharai Upazila, Chittagong District, Bangladesh

- Union
- Location in Bangladesh
- Coordinates: 22.7458°N 91.5562°E
- Country: Chittagong Bangladesh
- Division: Chittagong Division
- District: Chittagong District
- Upazilas: Mirsharai Upazila

Area
  - Total: 18.6 km^{2} (7.2 sq mi)

Population (2001)
  - Total: 17,706
- Time zone: UTC+6 (BST)

Mayani Union is a union parishad, the smallest administrative body of Bangladesh, located in Mirsharai Upazila, Chittagong District, Bangladesh. The total population is 17,706.
