= Mithanala Union =

Union of Mirsharai Upazila, Chittagong District, Bangladesh

- Union
- Location in Bangladesh
- Country: Chittagong Bangladesh
- Division: Chittagong Division
- District: Chittagong District
- Upazilas: Mirsharai Upazila

Area
  - Total: 21.6 km^{2} (8.3 sq mi)

Population (2001)
  - Total: 23,546
- Time zone: UTC+6 (BST)

Mithanala Union is a union, the smallest administrative body of Bangladesh, located in Mirsharai Upazila, Chittagong District, Bangladesh. The total population is 23,546.
