= Deep Depression BOB 05 (2024) =

North Indian cyclone

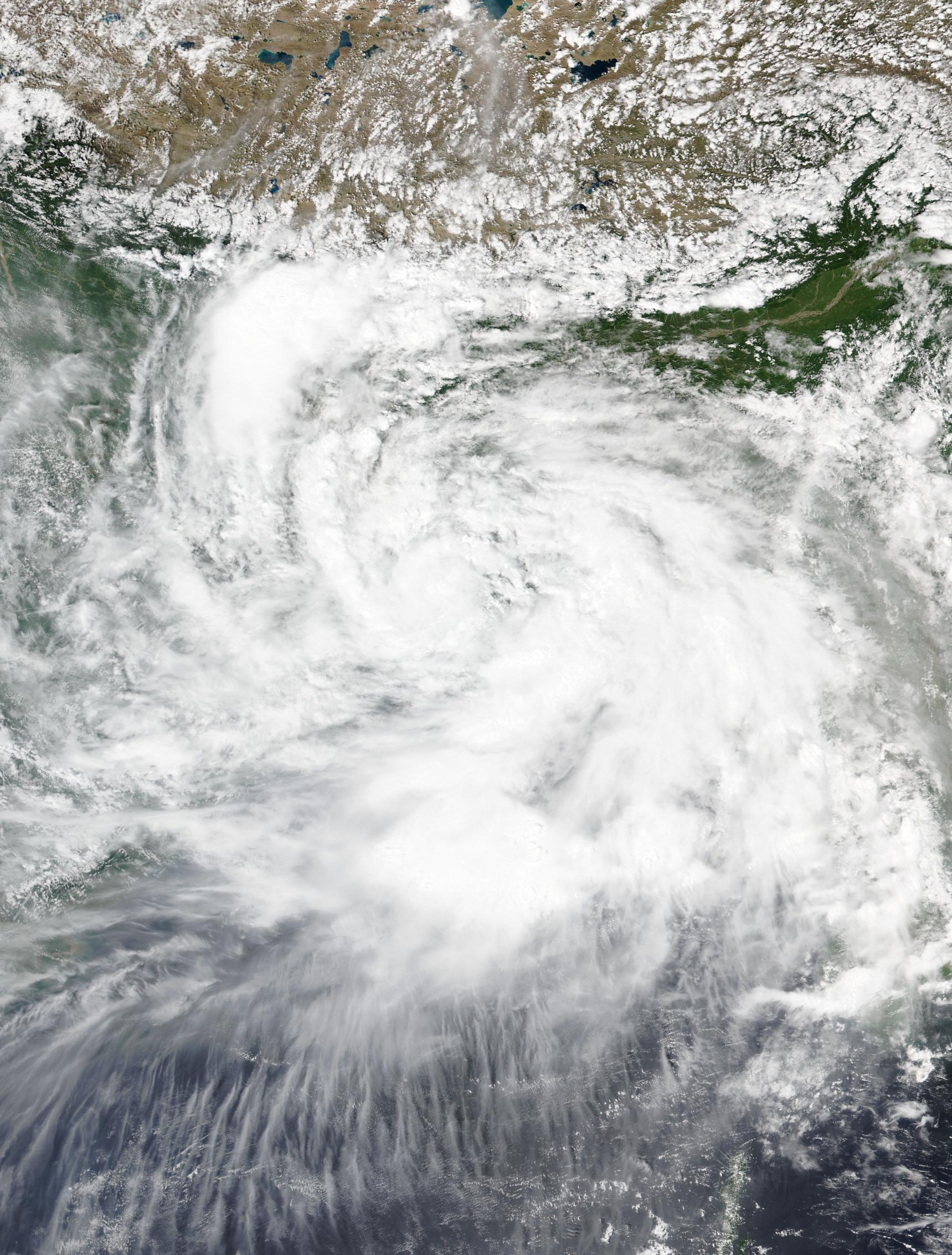
- Deep Depression BOB 05 at its peak intensity on 14 September

Meteorological history
- Formed: 13 September 2024
- Dissipated: 18 September 2024

Deep depression
- 3-minute sustained (IMD)
- Highest winds: 55 km/h (35 mph)
- Lowest pressure: 989 hPa (mbar); 29.21 inHg

Overall effects
- Fatalities: 53 (25 in Bangladesh, 28 in India)
- Missing: 308
- Areas affected: Bangladesh, India
- Part of the 2024 North Indian Ocean cyclone season

Deep Depression BOB 05 was a weak tropical cyclone that impacted Bangladesh and India. The seventh depression and fourth deep depression of the 2024 North Indian Ocean cyclone season, BOB 05 originated from a broad area of cyclonic circulation. Moving generally northwestward, the depression failed to intensify further, reaching maximum sustained winds of 55 km/h (35 mph) and a central pressure of 989 hPa (29.21 inHg). It would weaken, becoming a remnant low on 18 September.

Heavy rainfall from the storm led to severe flooding in southeastern Bangladesh, affecting over 50,000 people across 40 villages in Ukhia Upazila, with Haldia Palong and Jaliapalong areas being the most impacted, totaling 35,000 residents. Additionally, Chakaria Upazila experienced flooding that disrupted 20,000 residents and caused significant damage to agricultural land. Meanwhile, in Kolkata, 72.4 mm (2.85 in) of rain was recorded over a 24-hour period, with a total of 125.8 mm (4.95 in).

== Meteorological history ==
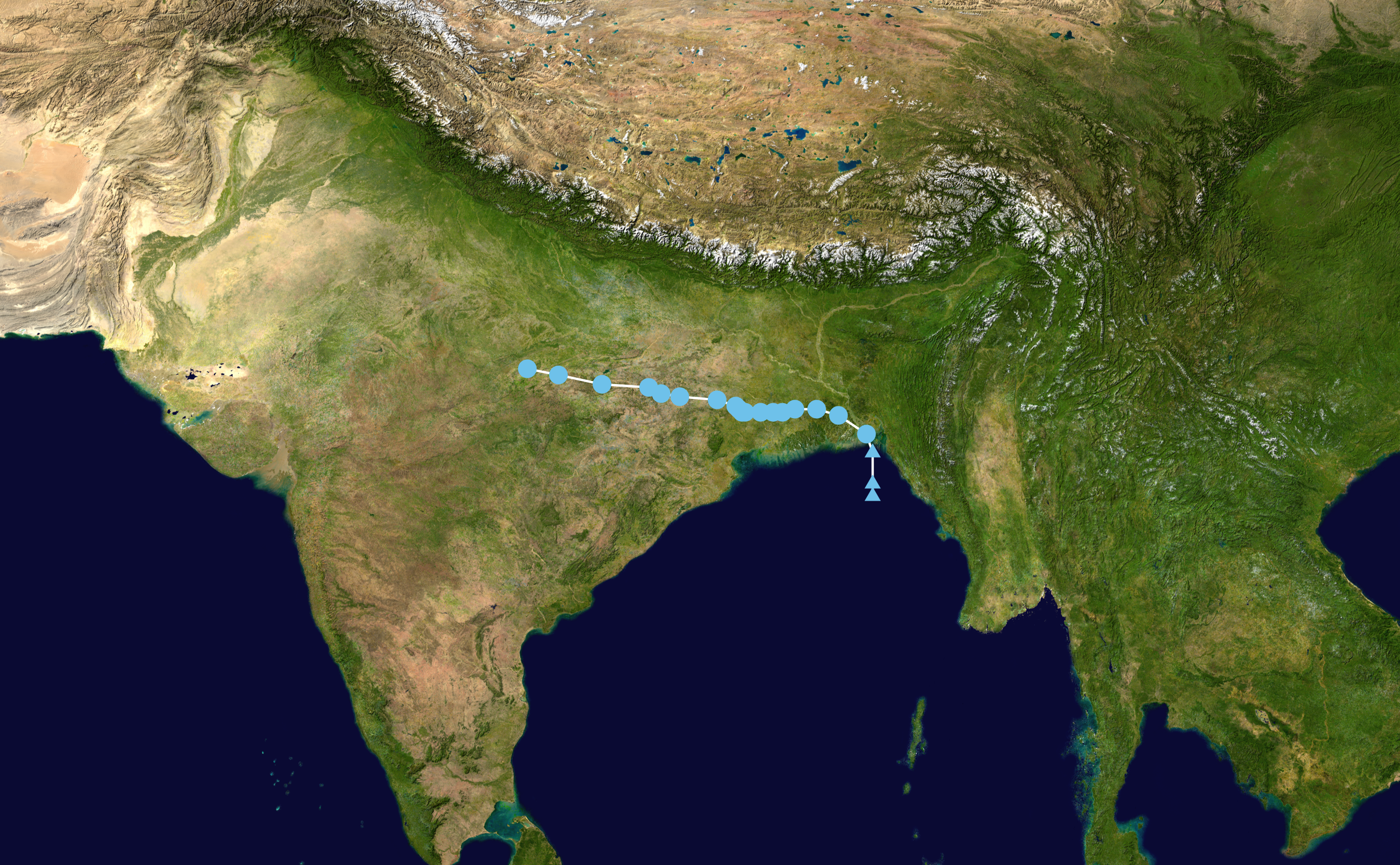
Map plotting the storm's track and intensity, according to the Saffir–Simpson scale Map key Saffir–Simpson scale Tropical depression (≤38 mph, ≤62 km/h) Tropical storm (39–73 mph, 63–118 km/h) Category 1 (74–95 mph, 119–153 km/h) Category 2 (96–110 mph, 154–177 km/h) Category 3 (111–129 mph, 178–208 km/h) Category 4 (130–156 mph, 209–251 km/h) Category 5 (≥157 mph, ≥252 km/h) Unknown Storm type Tropical cyclone Subtropical cyclone Extratropical cyclone, remnant low, tropical disturbance, or monsoon depression

The India Meteorological Department (IMD) started to track a cyclonic circulation over Myanmar on 11 September. This disturbance coalesced into a low-pressure area the next day, further developing into a well-marked low-pressure just a few hours later. Soon after, it intensified into a depression. The following day, the depression further strengthened into a deep depression over Bangladesh and West Bengal.

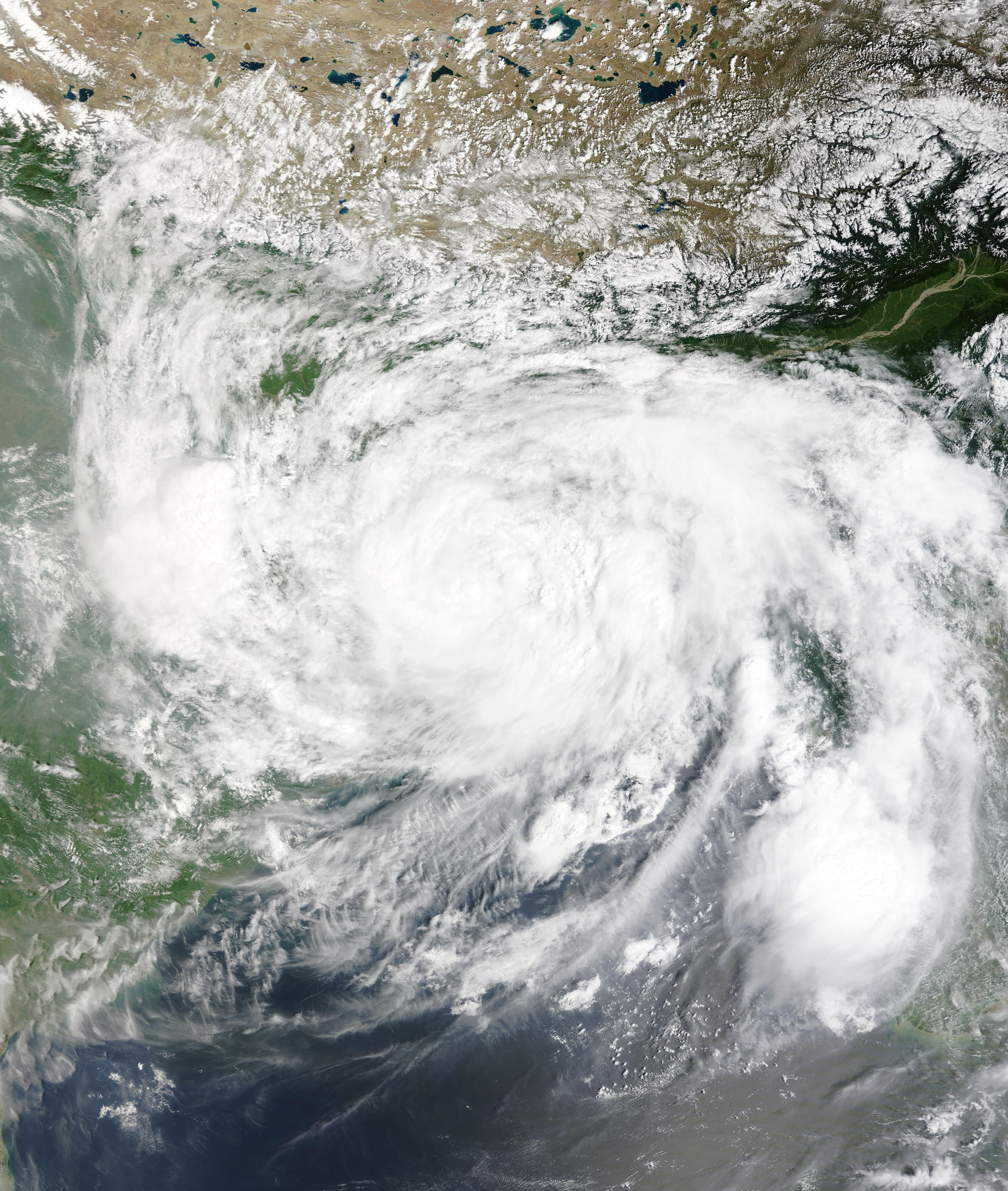
Deep Depression BOB 05 on September 15, 2024.

As it was located in the westerlies of the southwest monsoon, on September 16, BOB 05 exhibited persistent deep convection driven by mid-level anticyclonic shear. A few hours later, the system weakened to a depression as it drifted slowly westward over western India. The depression subsequently lost organization, degenerating into a well-marked low pressure area over Madhya Pradesh by 00:00 UTC on September 18.

== Impact ==
=== Bangladesh ===
The storm produced heavy rainfall in southeastern Bangladesh. Seven people were killed by landslides in Cox's Bazar District. Rainfall flooded some 200 villages in Cox's Bazar Sadar. Six other upazilas remained flooded. In Ukhia Upazila, flooding affected over 50,000 people across 40 villages. Among them were the Haldia Palong and Jaliapalong areas constituting the most affected population of 35,000. Some 10,000 residents across eight neighbourhoods including Nuniarchara, which are flood-prone, were also affected. Flooding in Chakaria Upazila also disrupted 20,000 residents; agriculture land were also badly damaged. Eleven deaths were recorded and 100 missing fishermen in Noakhali District, 35,441 were relocated to camps, and 1.5 million people were trapped by floodwaters. Two people were killed when a boat capsized in Jagannathpur Upazila.

Over a dozen fishing trawlers carrying an estimated 500 people off the coast of Cox's Bazar were unaccounted since 11 September. On 15 September, most of these fishermen returned to land but 250 others on 23 trawlers remained missing. At least eight trawlers capsized in rough seas; some fishermen swam to shore while many others were missing. Two bodies were found at Ukhia's Inani Beach while three were recovered along the shores of Nazirartek, Pechar Dwip and Kolatoli Square. A search operation for the missing was initiated by the Bangladesh Navy. Indian fishermen also rescued 12 Bangladeshi nationals stranded in the bay due to rough seas.

=== India ===
On 14 September, the IMD said light to moderate rain was possible in West Bengal while some areas might experience extreme rainfall. Intense rainfall was expected in Odisha, Jharkhand, Bihar, Chhattisgarh, Mizoram, Tripura, Assam and Meghalaya from 14 to 16 September. A "red" alert was later issued for West Bengal and Odisha with a greater expectation for intense rain. In Kolkata, 72.4 mm (2.85 in) of rain was recorded over a 24-hour period. Over 125.8 mm (4.95 in) of rain was measured between 13 and 14 September in the city. Due to the heavy rains, the Damodar Valley Corporation released more than 3.5 lakh cusec (9,911 cubic metres per second) of water from its dams, resulting in inundation of Birbhum, Bankura, Howrah, Hooghly, North and South 24 Parganas, Purba and Paschim Medinipur, and Paschim Bardhaman districts of West Bengal. Twenty-eight people were killed due to these floods and 25,000 people had to moved to safer areas.

== See also ==
- Weather of 2024
- Tropical cyclones in 2024
