= Hotel–Motel zone =

Hotel–Motel zone হোটেল–মোটেল জোন
- Neighbourhood
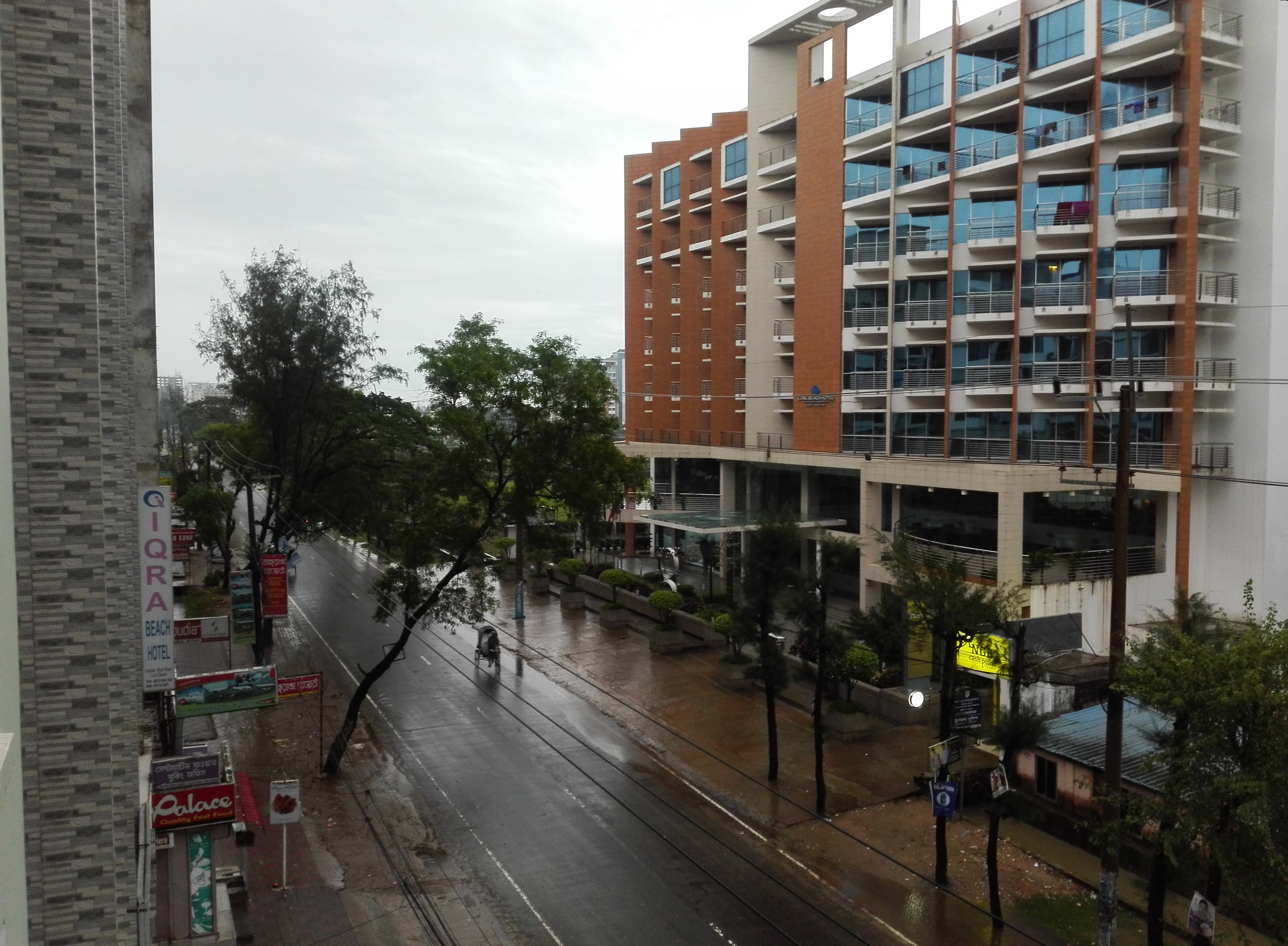
- A street of Hotel–Motel zone

- Location in Chittagong Division, Bangladesh
- Coordinates: 21.428474°N 91.9733432°E
- Country: Bangladesh
- Division: Chittagong Division
- District: Cox's Bazar District
- Time zone: UTC+6 (BST)

Hotel–Motel zone (Bengali: হোটেল–মোটেল জোন) is an area in Cox's Bazar, Bangladesh, situated at the Kolatoli Square area of the city. Cox's Bazar Cultural Center is situated at the area. It is said to be a safe haven for criminals. In 2023, the Rapid Action Battalion found two torture cells criminals used to keep abducted people for money at the area.
