= Mermaid Beach Resort =

- Logo of MBR

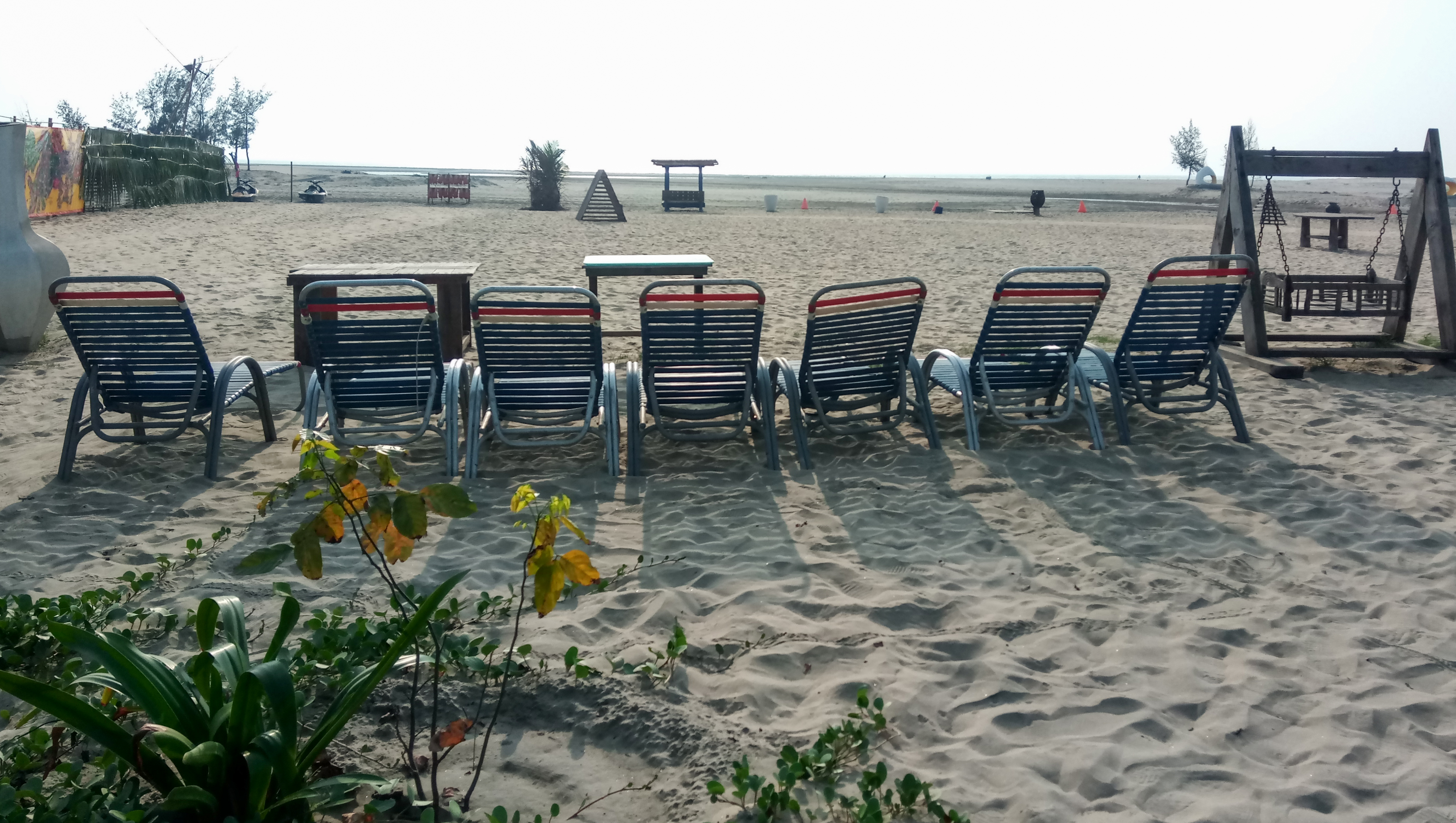

- Location within Bangladesh
- Interactive map of Mermaid Beach Resort
- Location: Cox's Bazar; Pechar Dwip, Cox's Bazar; 21.312185°N 92.0408928°E
- Website: mermaidbeachresort.net

The Mermaid Beach Resort (MBR) (Bengali: মারমেইড বিচ রিসোর্ট) is an integrated resort, located in Pechar Dwip, beside the beach near Cox's Bazar–Tekhnaf Marine Drive, at Himchari, Cox's Bazar, Bangladesh. It offers easy access to a secluded beach. In 2015, the resort has been received Certificate of Excellence award honors for their hospitality businesses that consistently achieve outstanding reviews on TripAdvisor.

== Description ==
There are two restaurants at the Resort, one café special for Italian food and another restaurant offers world cuisine.

== Gallery ==
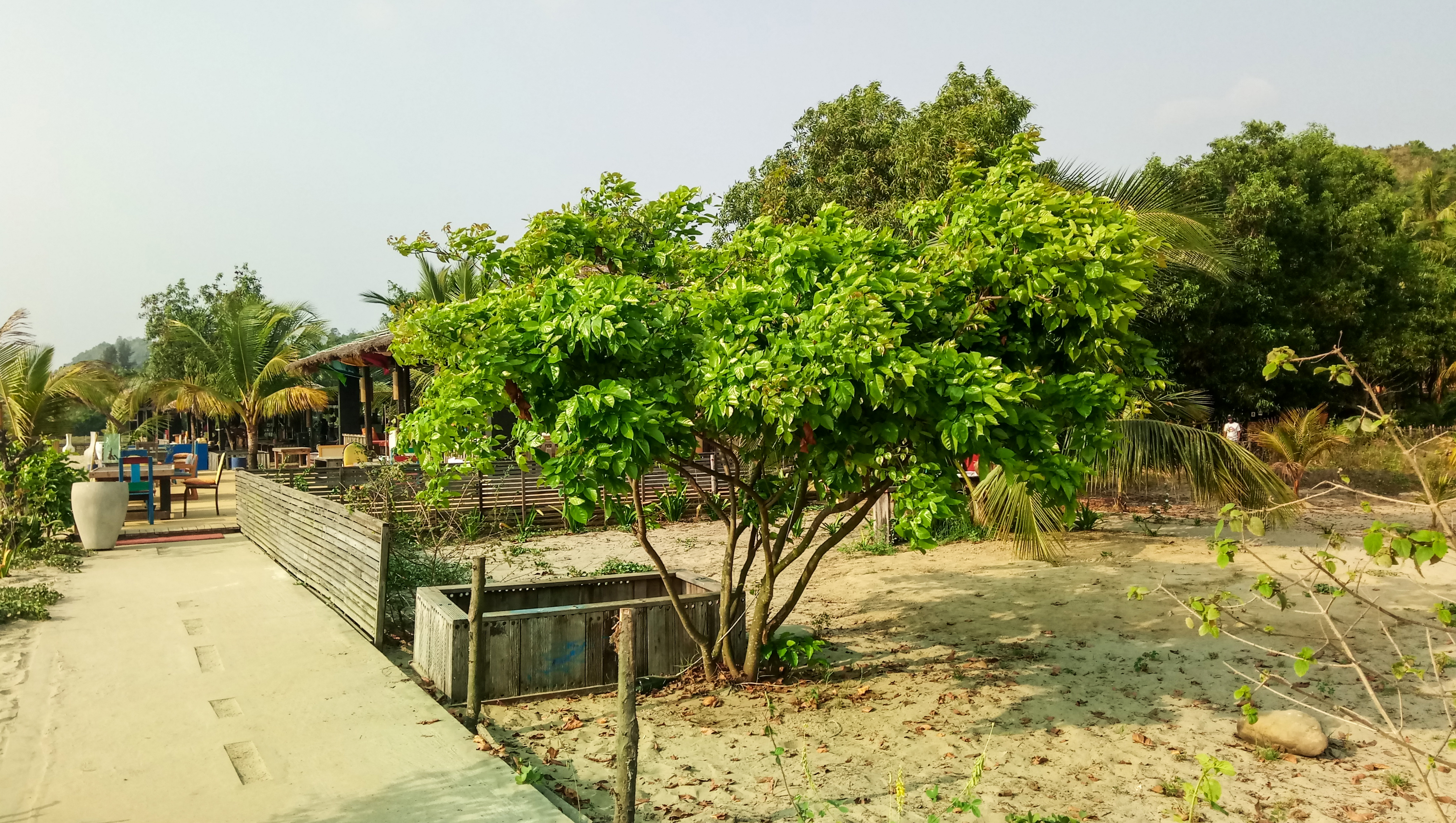

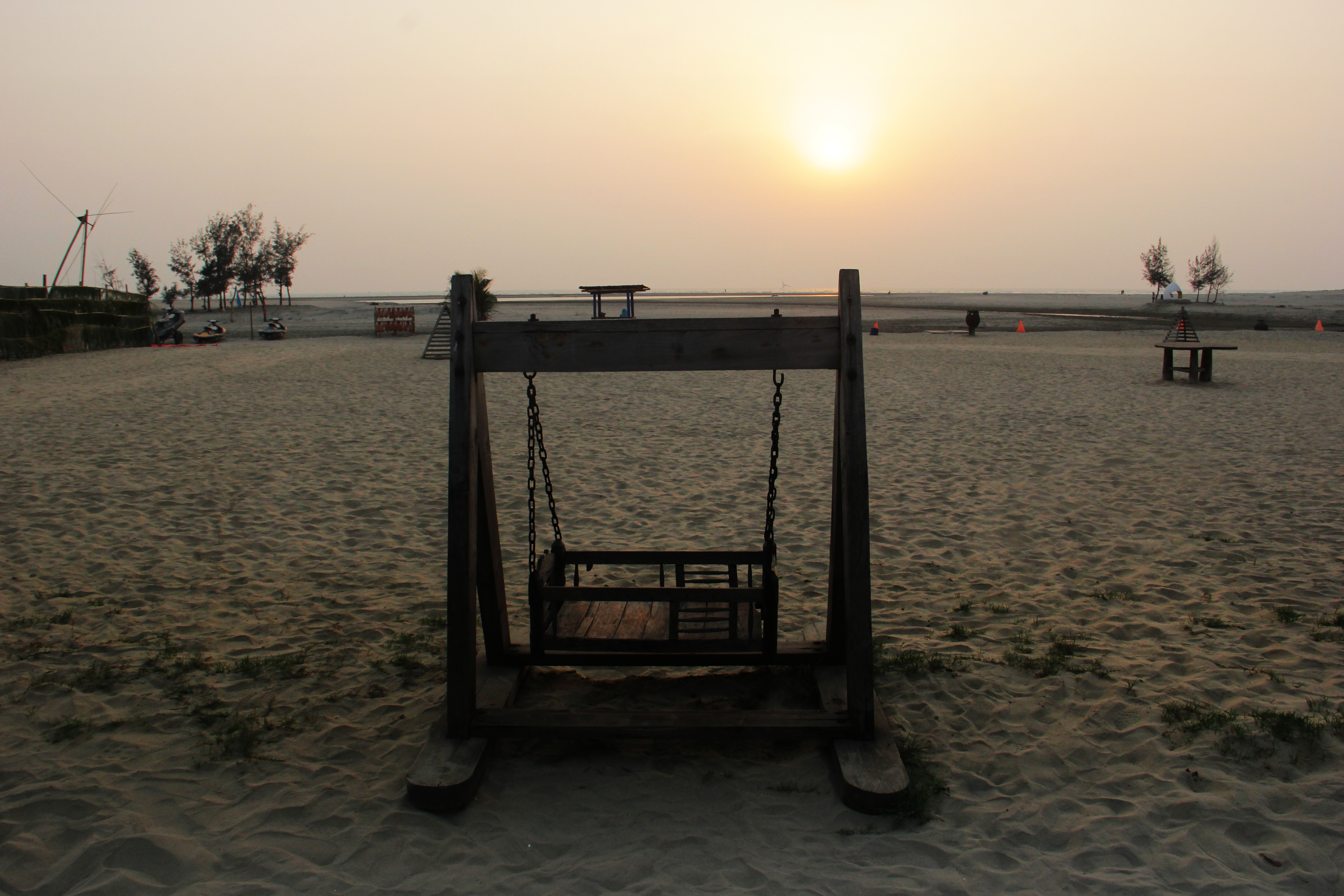

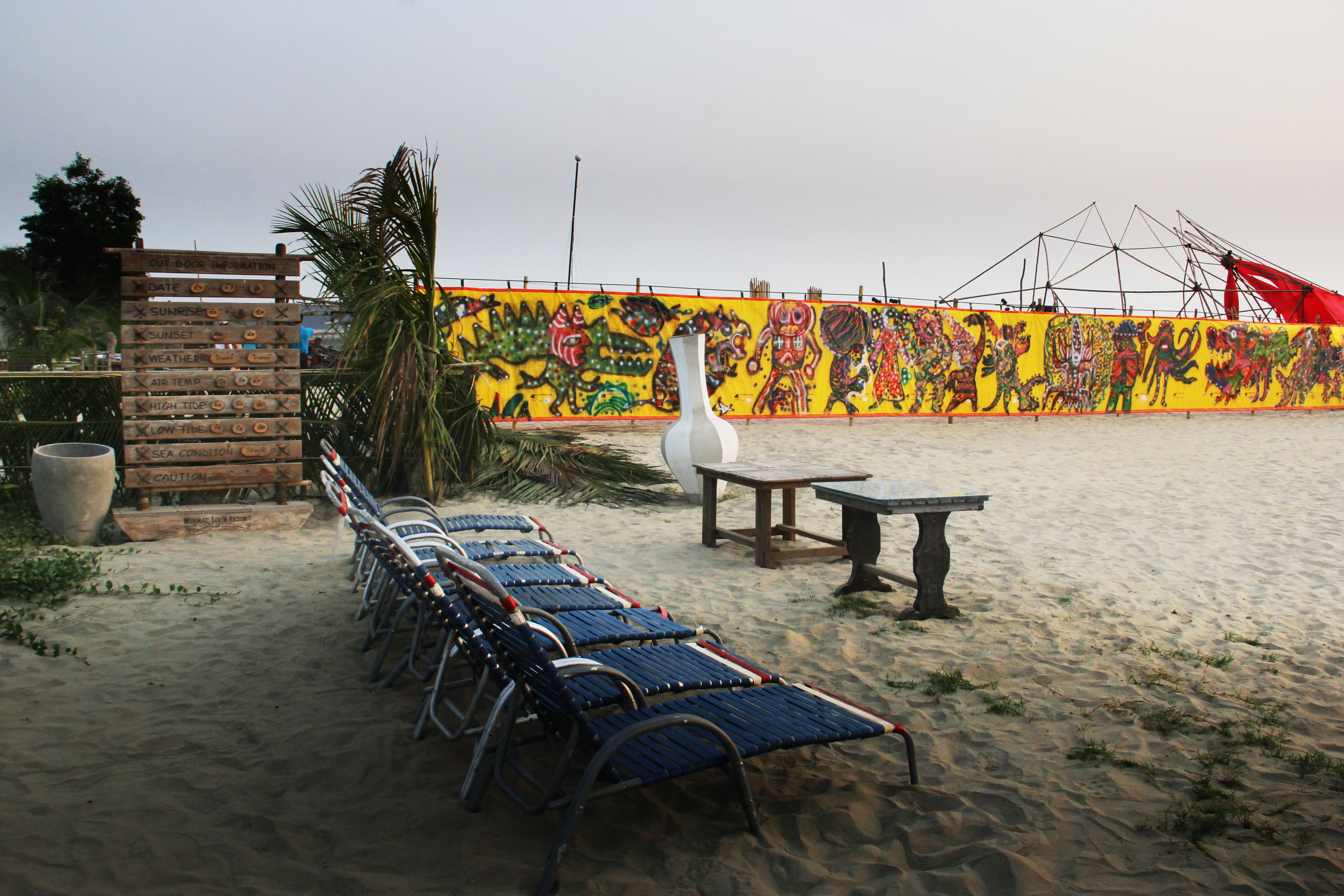

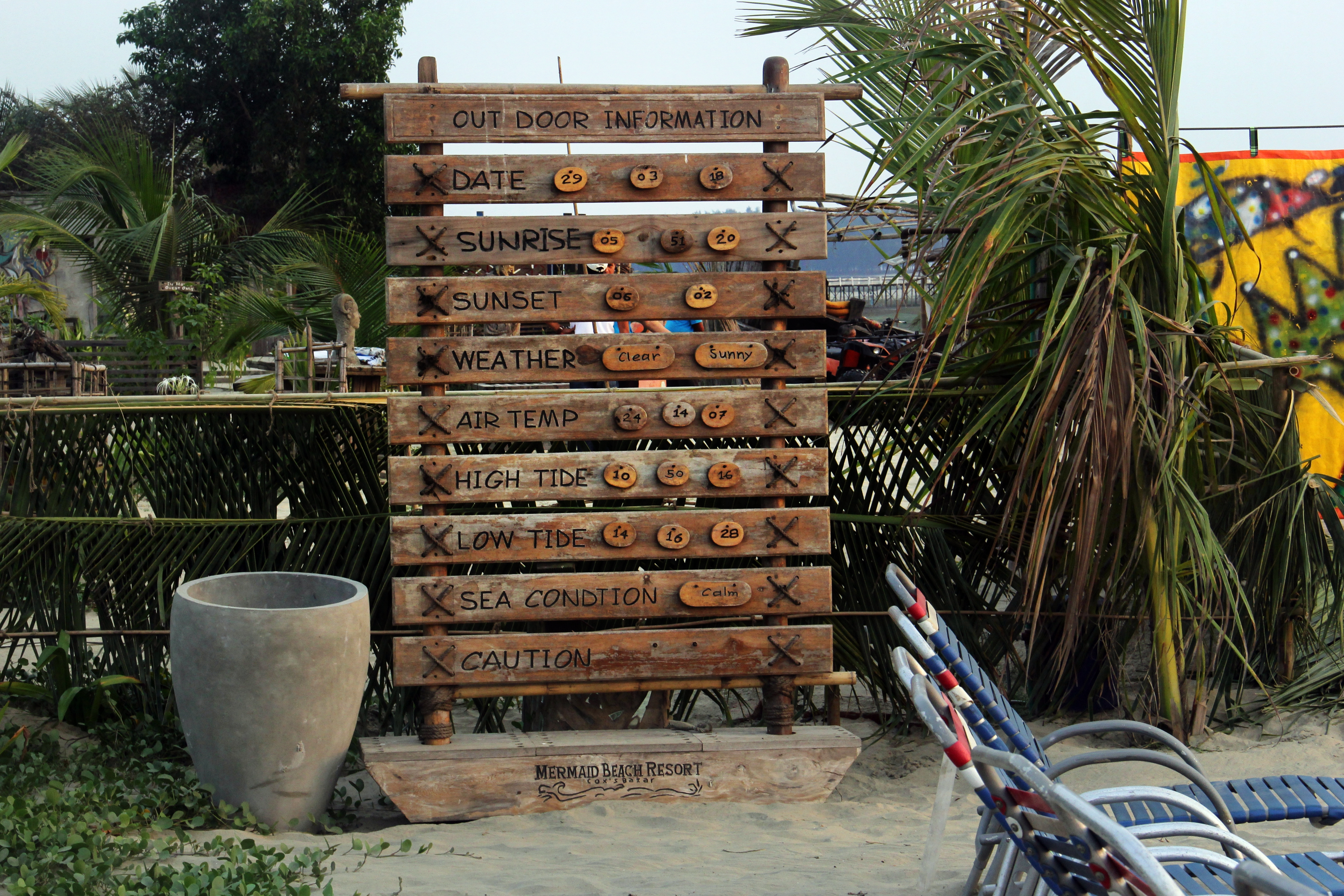

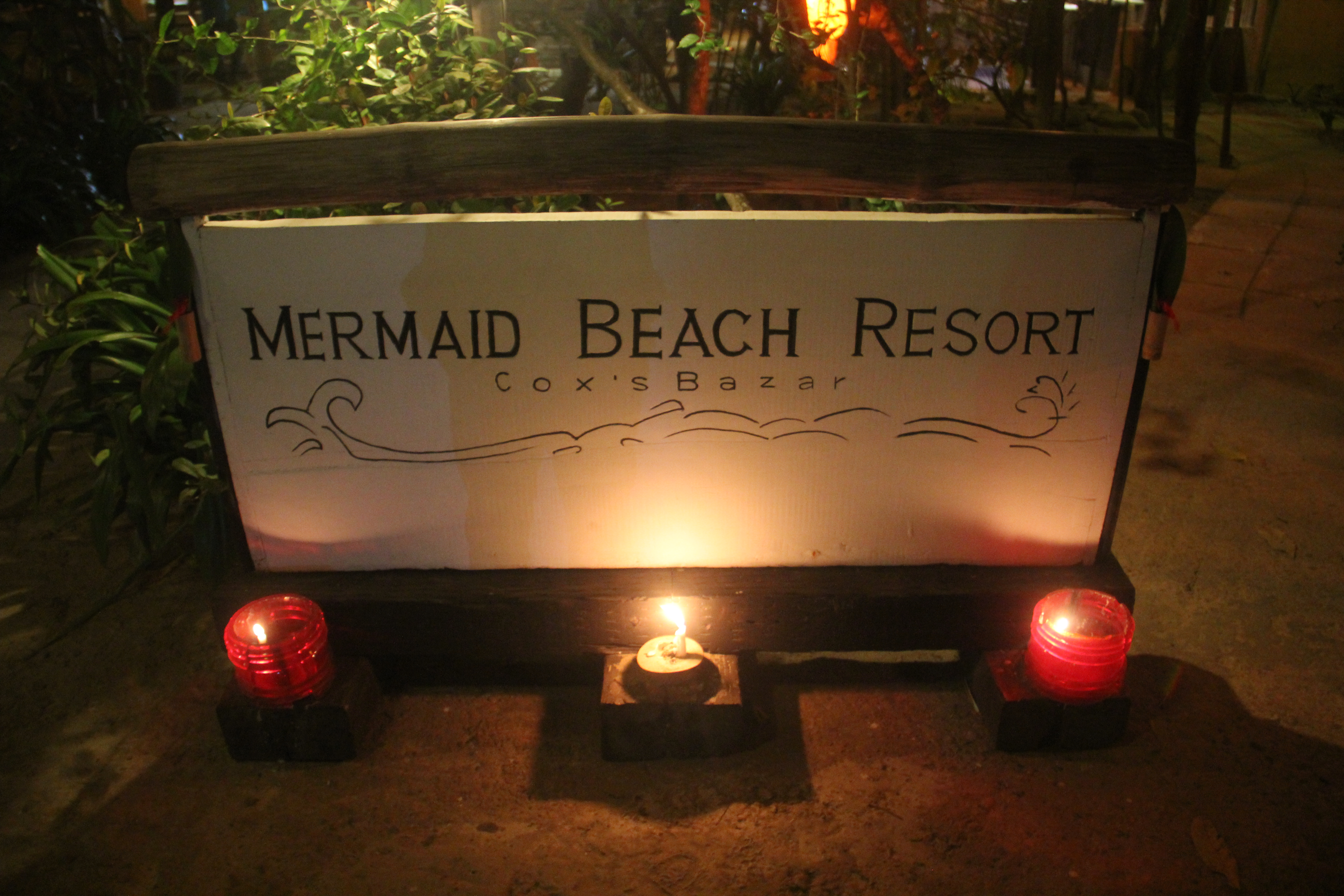

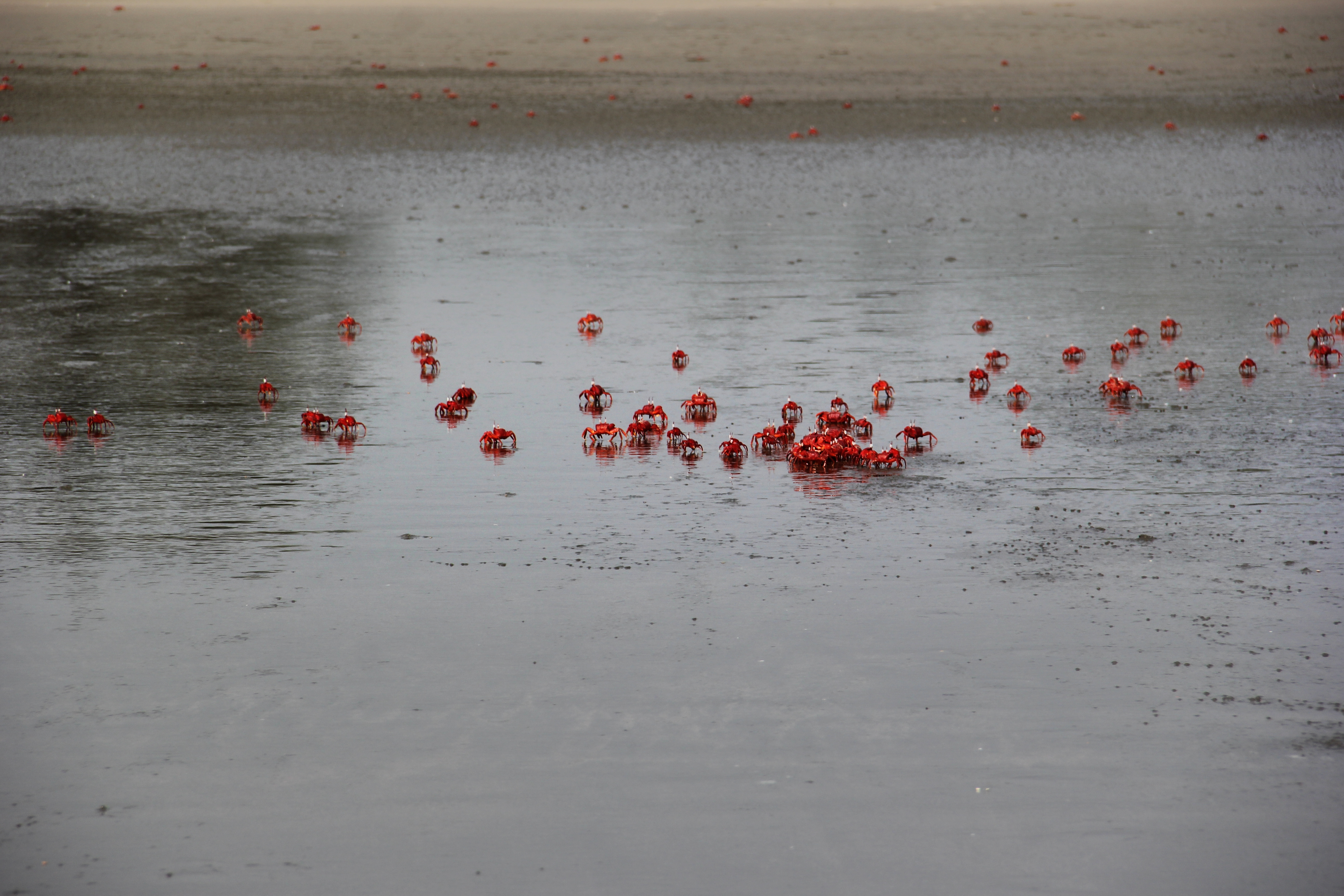

== Sister resorts ==
=== Mermaid Beach House Collection ===
Mermaid Beach House Collection is a beach house located just one kilometre away from the Mermaid Beach Resort.

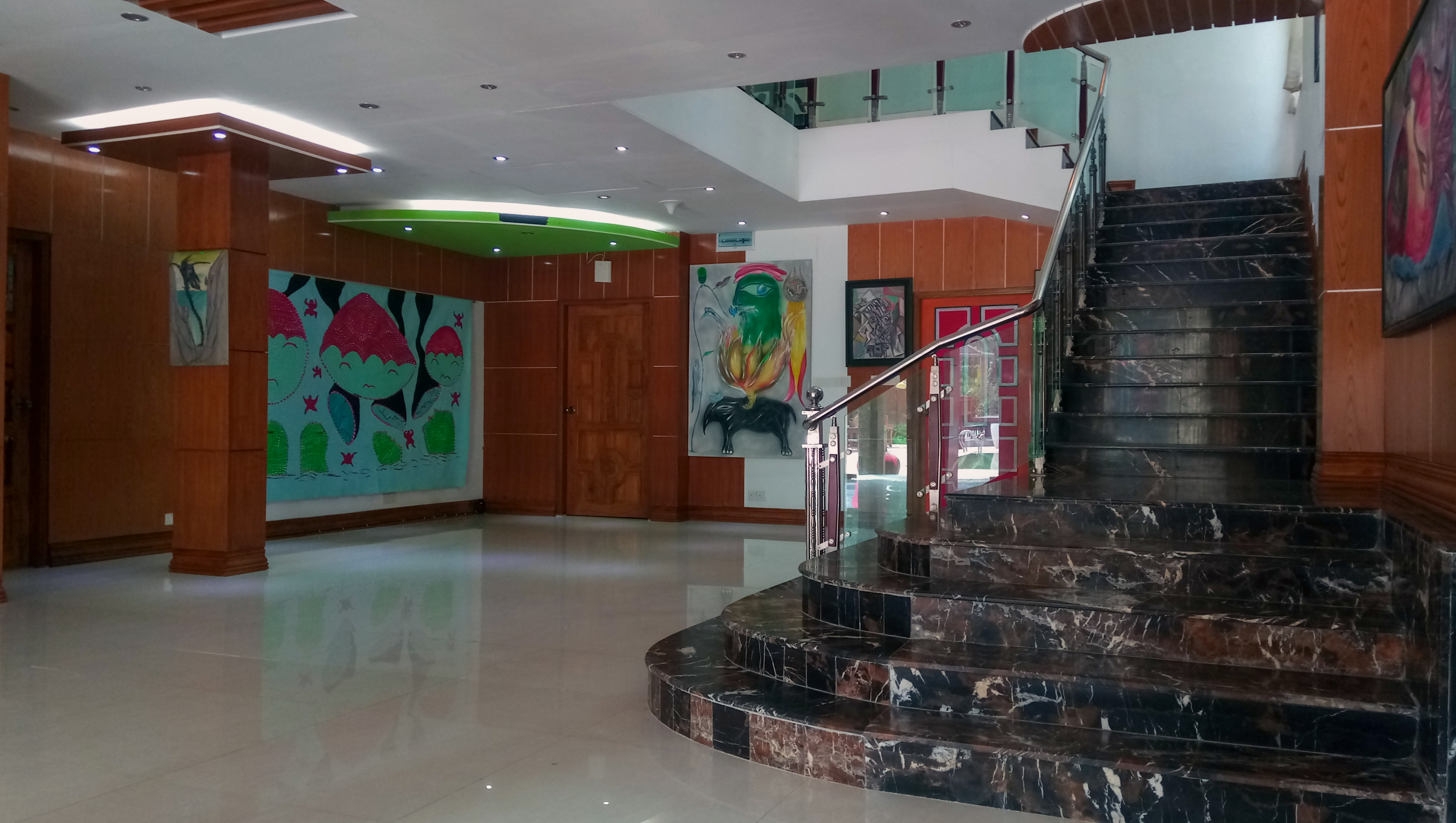
Beach House

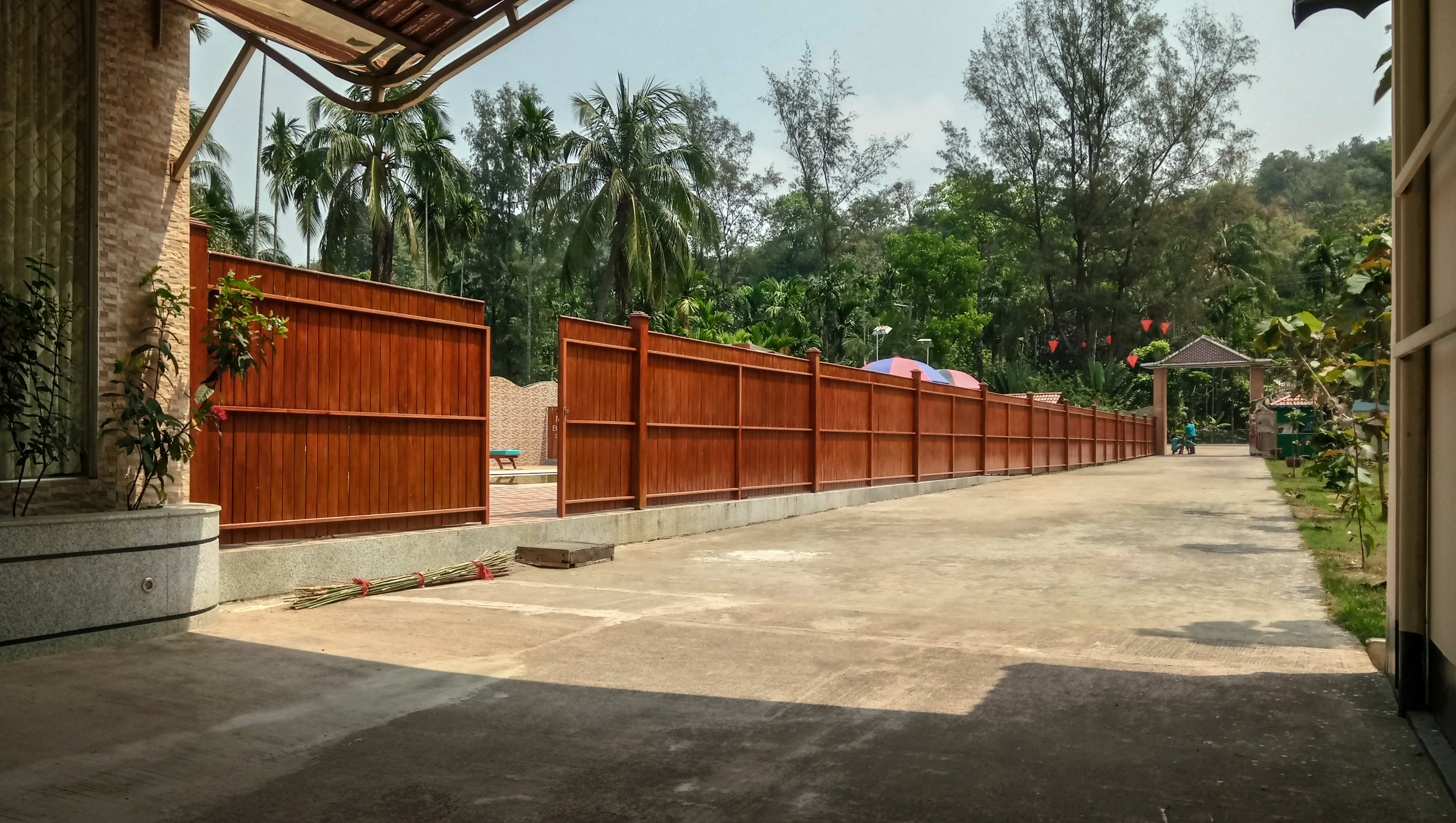
Pool side

=== Mermaid Ecoresort ===
Mermaid Ecoresort is another sister resort located just one kilometre away from the Mermaid Beach Resort.
