= Nazirartek =

Nazirartek নাজিরারটেক
- Village
- Location in Chittagong Division Nazirartek (Bangladesh)
- Coordinates: 21.4662643°N 91.9474561°E
- Country: Bangladesh
- Division: Chittagong
- District: Cox's Bazar
- Upazilla: Sadar

Government
  - Type: Municipality
  - Body: Cox's Bazar Municipality

Languages
  - National: Bengali
- Time zone: UTC+6:00 (BST)
- PIN code: 4700

Nazirartek is a village in Cox's Bazar District of Bangladesh. It is an affiliated area of Ward No. 1 of Cox's Bazar Municipality. The country's largest dried fish processing industry is located here. This village is located 7 km from Cox's Bazar.

== Dried fish processing area ==
A dried fish processing unit is located in this village. The processing unit has been built on 100 acres of land in the coastal area where dried fish is prepared during the rest of the year except the rainy season. Two hundred tons of dried fish are regularly produced in this largest dried fish processing area of Bangladesh. 5000 workers are employed in Nazirartek's dried fish production industry and 30,000 fishermen of Cox's Bazar district are engaged to supply fish here. The dried fishes produced from this industry are sold in the country as well as exported abroad.

== Issues ==
- The dried fish processing industry in Nazirartek is notorious for child labour. Children work here for low wages due to poverty. They work here at risk of physical harm. According to Winrock International, 13,524 children work there.
- Due to the decrease in the number of fish required for the production of dried fish and the increase in the demand for dry fish, some traders are using harmful chemicals to save time instead of drying the fish in the sun in the process of producing dried fish.
- It is alleged that land grabbers are illegally occupying and selling the seabed land near Nazirertek area. Thus the area is suffering from environmental pollution due to encroachment of seabed.

== Incidents ==
- On 19 August 2022, 8 fishermen went missing after a fishing trawler capaized due to a storm at Nazirartek Point in the Bay of Bengal. Later one body was found in the sea.
- On 23 April 2023, the dead bodies of ten fishermen were found with their hands and feet tied after another trawler capsized at the same location. Police arrested two suspects in this incident.
