= Nuniarchara =

Nuniarchara নুনিয়ারছড়া
- Neighbourhood
- Location in Chittagong Division, Bangladesh
- Coordinates: 21.4745035°N 91.9660917°E
- Country: Bangladesh
- Division: Chittagong Division
- District: Cox's Bazar District
- Time zone: UTC+6 (BST)

Nuniarchara (Bengali: নুনিয়ারছড়া) is an area situated in Cox's Bazar, Bangladesh.

== Description ==
It is accessible from Airport road of the city and near to the Cox's Bazar Airport. It is under the administration of the 2nd ward in Cox's Bazar Municipality. There is an industrial area. There is a jetty port of Bangladesh Inland Water Transport Authority. As of 2015, approximately 5,000 people live there. There is a mass grave related to the Bangladesh Liberation War.
