= Cox's Bazar =

City in Bangladesh

Cox's Bazar কক্সবাজার
- City
- Cox's Bazar
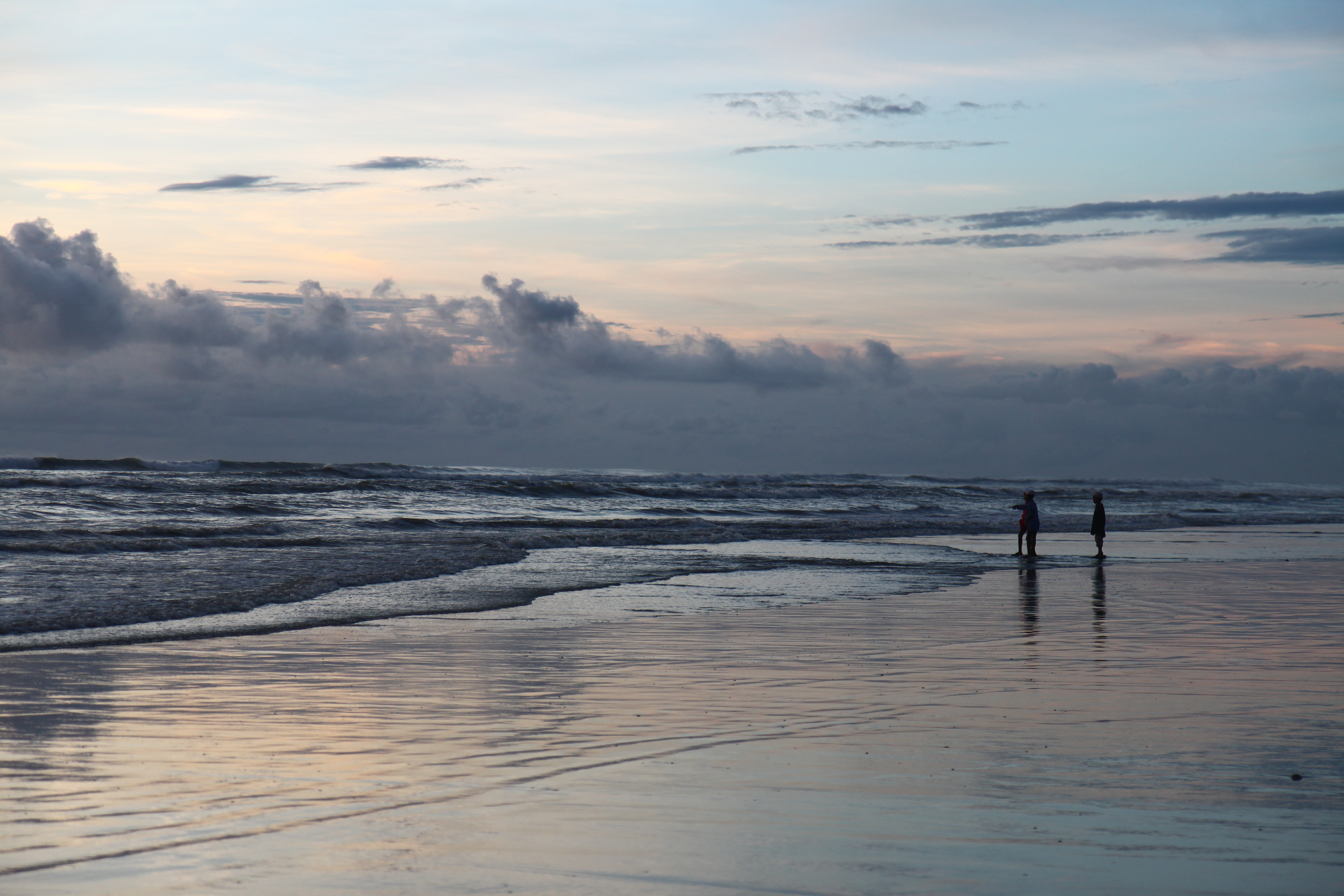
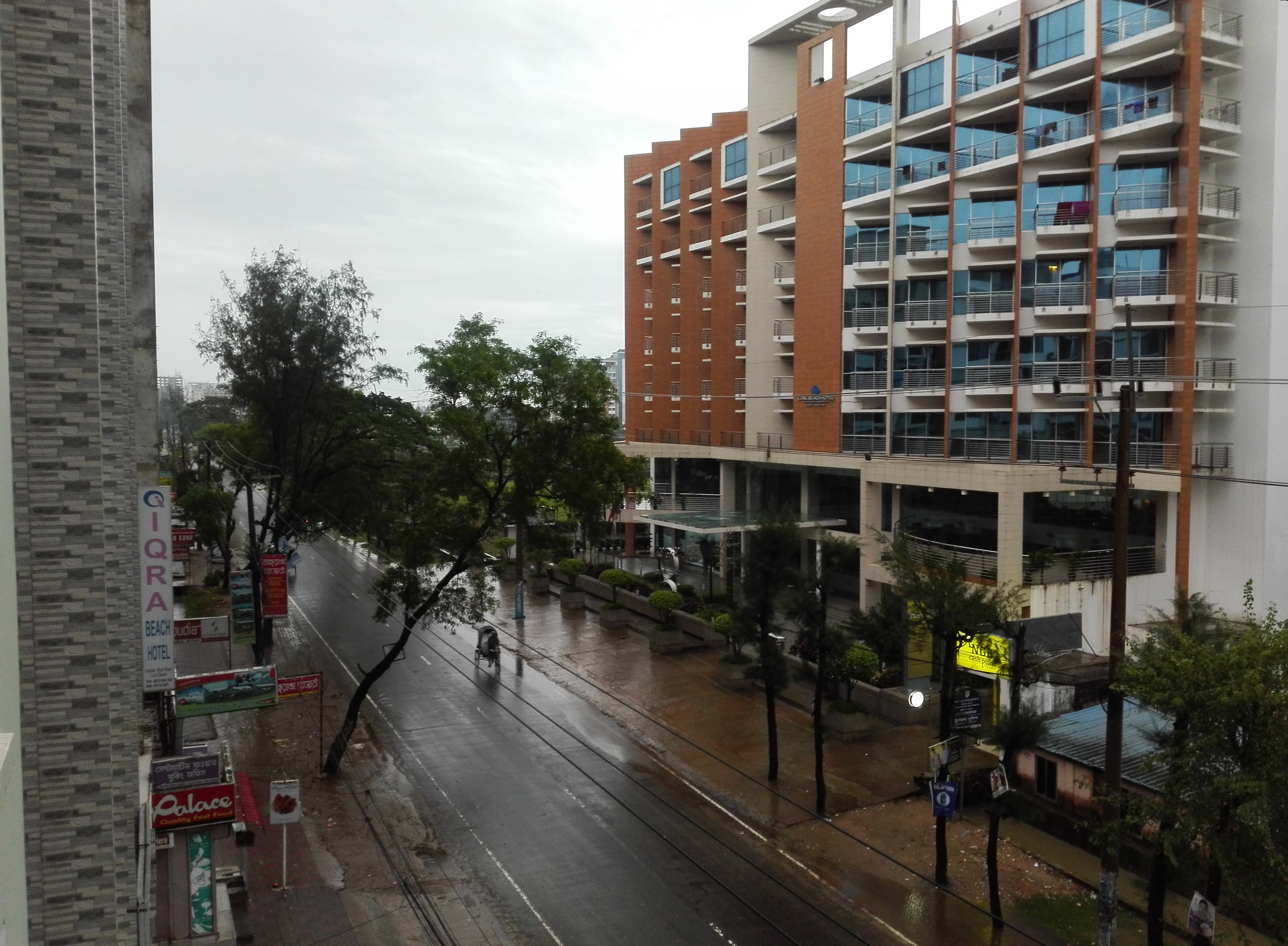
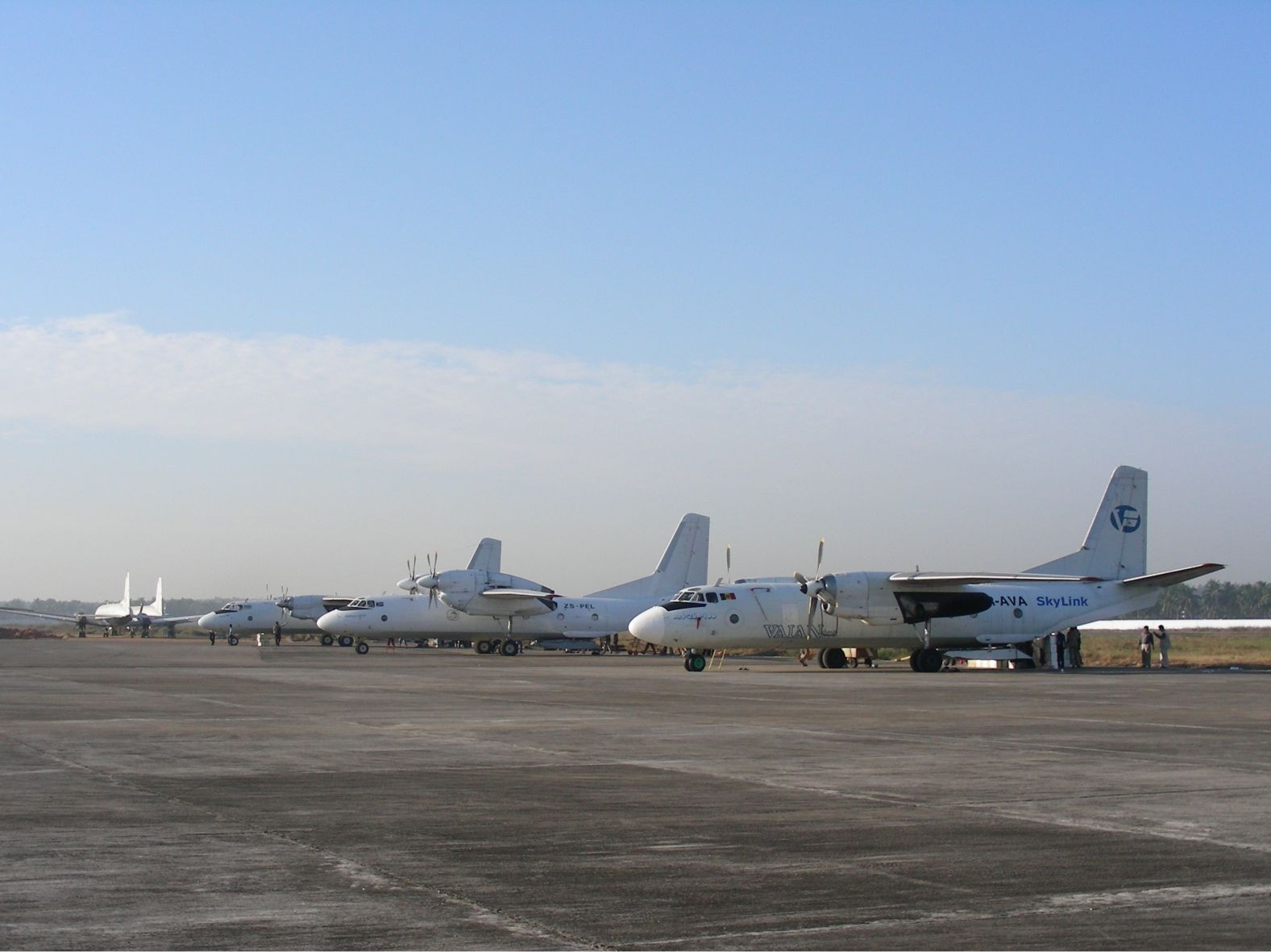
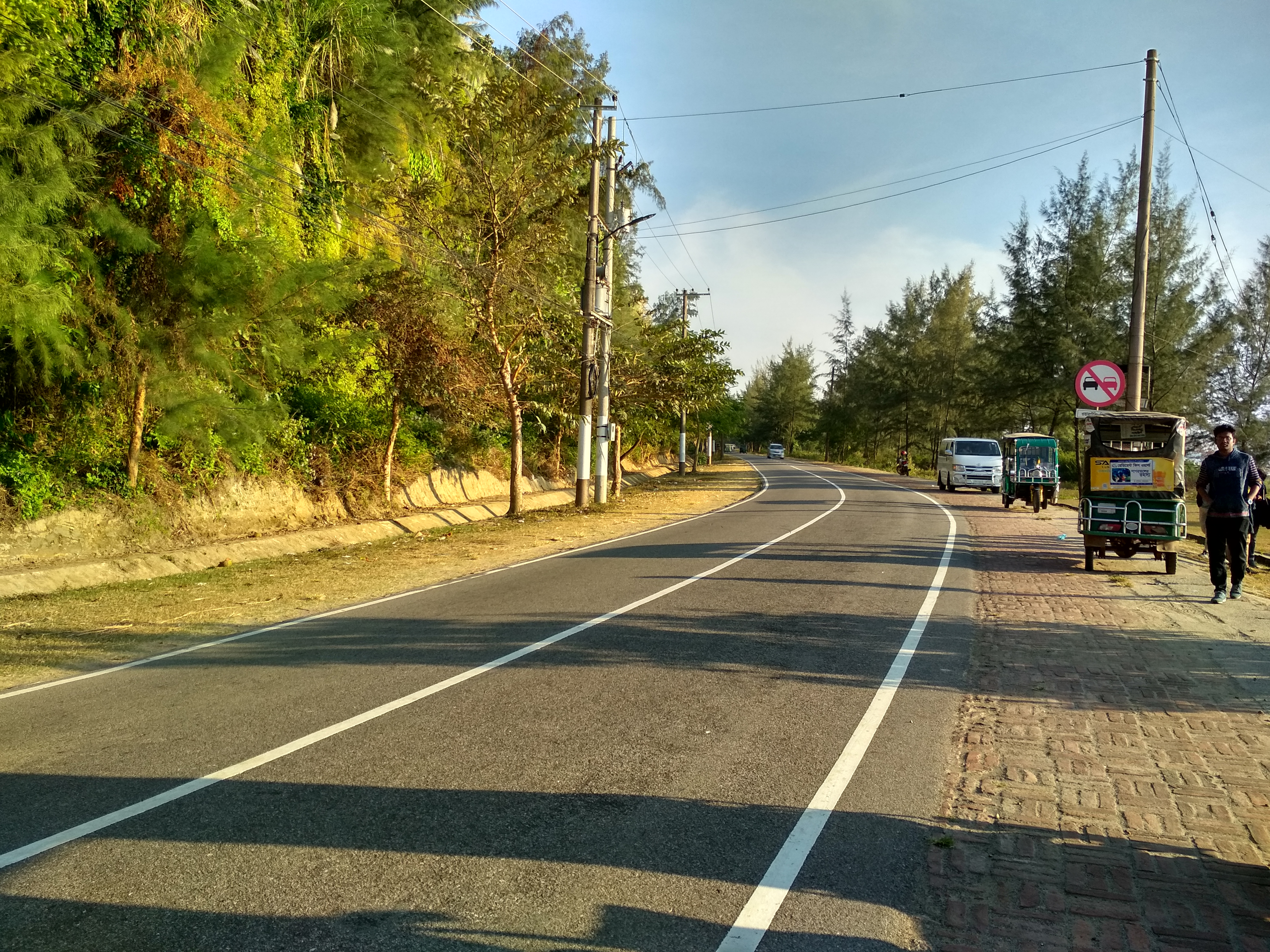
- Cox's Bazar beach Hotel–Motel zone Cox's Bazar railway station Cox's Bazar Airport Cox's Bazar–Teknaf Marine Drive

- Seal
- Nickname(s): Tourist Capital Of Bangladesh, Panow (locally)
- Location within Chittagong division Location within Bangladesh
- Coordinates: 21°25′38″N 92°00′18″E
- Country: Bangladesh
- Division: Chittagong
- District: Cox's Bazar

Government
  - Type: Mayor–Council
  - Body: Municipality
  - Administrator: Nizam Uddin Ahmed

Area
  - Total: 23.4 km^{2} (9.0 sq mi)
- Elevation: 3 m (9.8 ft)

Population (2022)
  - Total: 196,374
  - Density: 8,390/km^{2} (21,700/sq mi)

Languages
  - Official: Bengali • English
  - Regional: Chittagonian
- Time zone: UTC+6 (BST)
- Postal code: 4700
- Calling code: +880 34
- UN/LOCODE: BD CXB
- GDP (2022): PPP ▲$4.2 billion Nominal ▲$1.5 billion
- HDI (2023): 0.614 medium-low · 22nd of 22
- Airport: Cox's Bazar International Airport
- Planning Authority: Cox's Bazar Development Authority
- Water Supply and Sewerage Authority: Cox's Bazar Paurashava Water Supply Dept.
- Website: coxsbazar.gov.bd

Cox's Bazar (Note: /ˌkɒksɪz bəˈzɑːr/ KOK-siz bə-ZAHR; Bengali: কক্সবাজার, romanised: Kôksbajar, pronounced [ˈkɔks(es)ˌbad͡ʒaɾ]) is a city, fishing port, tourism centre, and the headquarters of the Cox's Bazar District and Cox's Bazar Sadar Upazila in south-eastern Bangladesh. The city has a population of about 196,000. Cox's Bazar Beach is a major tourist attraction.

== Administration ==
The city is administered by a Pourashava named Cox's Bazar Municipality. It covers an area of 23.4 km^{2} (9.0 sq mi) with 58 mahallas and 27 wards and as of 2022 had a population of nearly 200,000. Cox's Bazar is connected by road and air with the city of Chittagong.

The municipality is currently in process of being upgraded into a city corporation.

== Etymology ==
Cox's Bazar derives its name from Captain Hiram Cox, an officer of the British East India Company and Superintendent of Palongkee outpost. To commemorate his role in refugee rehabilitation work, a market was established and named after him.

Cox's Bazar is also known by the name Panowa, which translates literally as "yellow flower". An old name was "Palongkee".

== History ==
During the early 9th century, the greater Chittagong area, including Cox's Bazar, was under the rule of Arakan kings until its conquest by the Mughals in 1666. When the Mughal Prince Shah Shuja was passing through the hilly terrain of the present-day Cox's Bazar on his way to Arakan, he was attracted to its scenic and captivating beauty. He commanded his forces to camp there. His retinue of one thousand palanquins stopped there for some time. A place named Dulahazara, meaning "one thousand palanquins", still exists in the area. After the Mughals, the place came under the control of the Tipras and the Arakanese, followed by the Portuguese and then the British.

The name Cox's Bazar originated from British East India Company (EIC) official Hiram Cox, who was appointed as the Superintendent of Palonki (today's Cox's Bazar) outpost. He succeeded Warren Hastings, who became the Governor of Bengal following the passage of the Regulating Act 1773. Cox embarked upon the task of rehabilitation and settlement for the Arakanese refugees in the area. He rehabilitated many refugees in the area, but died in 1799 before finishing his work. To commemorate him, a market was established and named after him, called Cox's Bazar. Cox's Bazar was first established in 1854 and became a municipality in 1869.

After the Indian Rebellion of 1857, Company rule in India came to an end and was replaced by the British Crown. As a result, Cox's Bazar was declared a district of the Bengal Province under the British Crown.

=== 20th century ===
Just after the end of British rule in India in 1947, Cox's Bazar became part of East Pakistan. Fazlul Karim, the first post-independence chairman of Cox's Bazar Municipality, established the Tamarisk Forest along the beach. He wanted to attract tourists as well as to protect the beach from tsunamis. He donated much of his father-in-law's and his own lands as sites for constructing a public library and a town hall. Karim was inspired to build Cox's Bazar as a tourist spot after seeing beaches of Bombay and Karachi, and was a resort pioneer in developing Cox's Bazar as a destination. Karim established a maternity hospital, the stadium and the drainage system by procuring grants from the Ford Foundation and Rockefeller Foundation through correspondence. T. H. Matthews, the principal of the Dacca Engineering College (1–49~1954), was a friend who had helped him in these fundraising efforts. Engineer Chandi Charan Das was the government civil engineer who worked on all these projects.

In 1959 the municipality was turned into a town committee. In 1961 the Geological Survey of Pakistan initiated investigation of radioactive minerals like monazite around the Cox's Bazar sea-beach area.

In 1971, Cox's Bazar wharf was used as a naval port by the Pakistan Navy's gunboats. This and the nearby airstrip of the Pakistan Air Force were the scene of intense shelling by the Indian Navy during the Bangladesh Liberation War. During the war, Pakistani soldiers killed many people in the town, including eminent lawyer Jnanendralal Chowdhury. The killing of two freedom fighters named Farhad and Subhash at Badar Mokam is also recorded in history.

After Bangladesh's independence, Cox's Bazar started to receive administrative attention. In 1972 the town committee of Cox's Bazar was once again turned into a municipality. In 1975, The government of Bangladesh established a pilot plant at Kalatali. In 1984, Cox's Bazar subdivision was promoted to a district, and five years later (in 1989) the Cox's Bazar municipality was elevated to B-grade. In 1994 (jobs) the Marine Fisheries and Technology Station (MFTS) was established at Cox's Bazar. MFTS is a research station of Bangladesh Fisheries Research Institute (BFRI) headquartered in Mymensingh. The station covers a land area of four hectares and contains five laboratories.

=== 21st century ===
In September 2012 the municipality was the site of the Cox's Bazar and Ramu riots, where local Muslims attacked the Buddhist community over an alleged Quran desecration posted to Facebook.

In 2017, hundreds of thousands of Rohingya refugees from Myanmar arrived in Cox's Bazar District, amounting to 725,000 in October 2018; the resulting Kutupalong refugee camp became the largest refugee camp in the world.

In March 2021, a fire at the refugee camp left 15 dead and some 400 missing and displaced more than 45,000 mostly Rohingya refugees.

In 2023 Bangladesh evacuated over 50,000 people in Cox's Bazar to safe shelters as Cyclone Mocha approached.

During the July Revolution, around 10,000 tourists were stuck in Cox's Bazar, who were later transported by plane and army patrol.

== Geography and climate ==
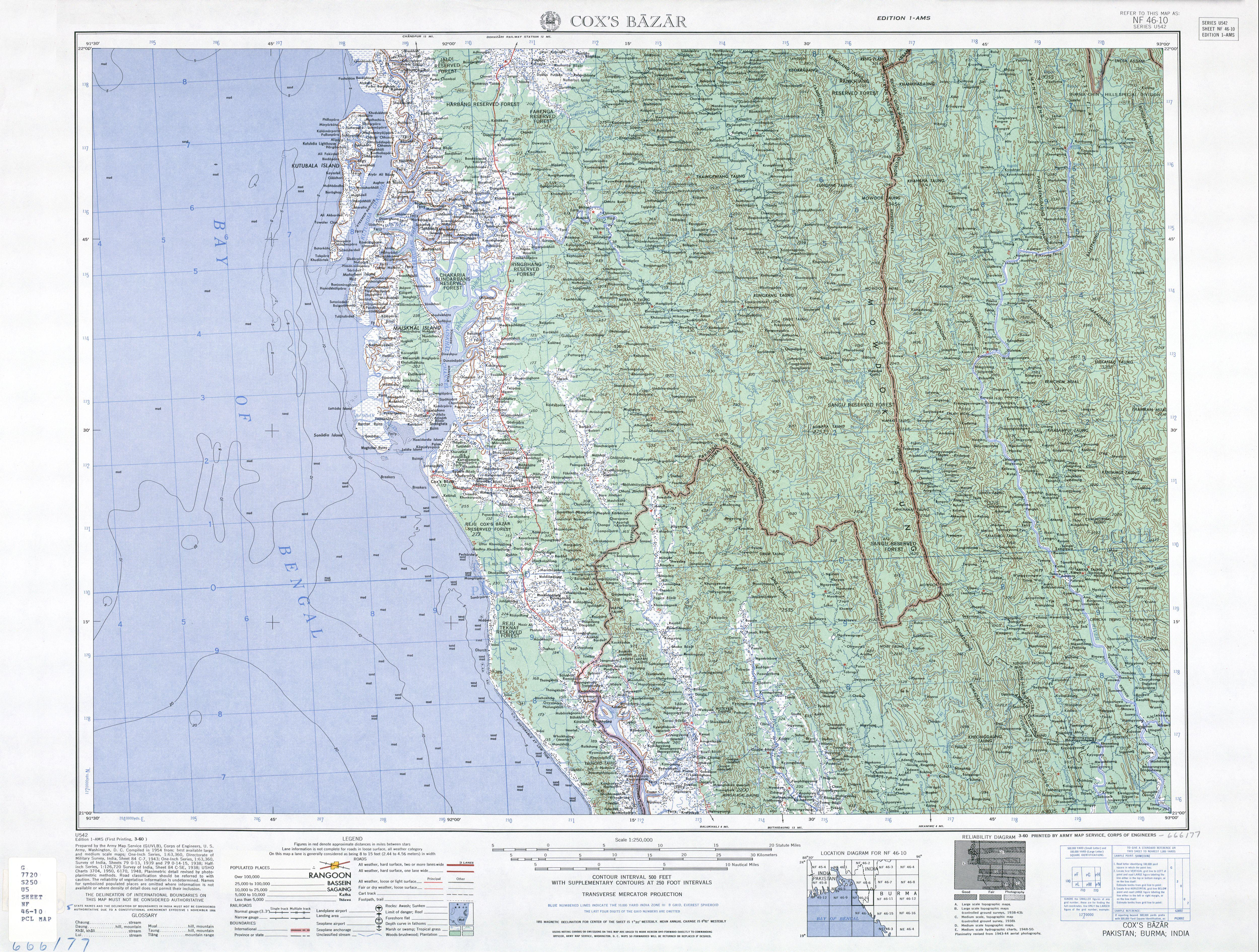
Cox's Bazar Map from Series U542, US Army Map Service, 1955

Cox's Bazar is located 150 km (93 mi) south of the divisional headquarter city of Chittagong. Cox's Bazar town has an area of 6.85 km^{2} (2.64 sq mi), and is bounded by Bakkhali River on the north and East, Bay of Bengal in the West, and Jhilwanj Union in the south.

The beach in Cox's Bazar has a gentle slope and with a length of 120 km (75 mi) and is one of the longest natural sea beaches of South East Asia.

Cox's Bazar lies on a coastal plain in the southeastern corner of Bangladesh. From above, the plain appears to bulge out into the Bay of Bengal. Along the shore is an extensive area of beach and dunes. Most of the city is built on a floodplain that is lower in elevation than the dunes, making it more susceptible to flooding due to cyclones and storm surges. The Cox's Bazar coastal plain was formed after the sea reached its present level around 6,500 years ago, with the area of the current floodplain originally forming a sediment sink that has since been gradually filled in by the Bakkhali river as well as smaller streams coming down from the hills.

The climate of Bangladesh is mostly determined by its location in the tropical monsoon climate region: high temperatures, heavy rainfall, and generally excessive humidity, with distinct seasonal variations. The climate of Cox's Bazar is mostly similar to the rest of the country, but with an even wetter southwest monsoon season due to its coastal location. The annual average temperature in Cox's Bazar is a maximum of 30.1 °C (86.2 °F) and a minimum of 22.0 °C (71.6 °F). The average annual rainfall is 3,524 mm (138.7 in).

Climate data for Cox's Bazar (1991–2020 normals, extremes 1908–present)
Month	Jan	Feb	Mar	Apr	May	Jun	Jul	Aug	Sep	Oct	Nov	Dec	Year
Record high °C (°F)	32.0 (89.6)	35.5 (95.9)	37.4 (99.3)	39.5 (103.1)	37.5 (99.5)	36.2 (97.2)	34.8 (94.6)	35.6 (96.1)	37.0 (98.6)	36.3 (97.3)	34.8 (94.6)	33.7 (92.7)	39.5 (103.1)
Mean daily maximum °C (°F)	27.1 (80.8)	29.5 (85.1)	31.9 (89.4)	33.1 (91.6)	33.1 (91.6)	31.6 (88.9)	30.8 (87.4)	31.1 (88.0)	31.7 (89.1)	32.1 (89.8)	30.8 (87.4)	28.2 (82.8)	30.9 (87.6)
Daily mean °C (°F)	20.3 (68.5)	22.9 (73.2)	26.2 (79.2)	28.4 (83.1)	28.9 (84.0)	28.0 (82.4)	27.4 (81.3)	27.6 (81.7)	27.8 (82.0)	27.6 (81.7)	25.1 (77.2)	21.6 (70.9)	26.0 (78.8)
Mean daily minimum °C (°F)	15.5 (59.9)	17.8 (64.0)	21.5 (70.7)	24.5 (76.1)	25.5 (77.9)	25.6 (78.1)	25.3 (77.5)	25.4 (77.7)	25.2 (77.4)	24.6 (76.3)	21.2 (70.2)	17.1 (62.8)	22.4 (72.3)
Record low °C (°F)	10.3 (50.5)	9.6 (49.3)	15.5 (59.9)	18.0 (64.4)	20.2 (68.4)	20.0 (68.0)	21.2 (70.2)	23.0 (73.4)	22.6 (72.7)	20.5 (68.9)	15.5 (59.9)	11.0 (51.8)	9.6 (49.3)
Average precipitation mm (inches)	6 (0.2)	15 (0.6)	38 (1.5)	85 (3.3)	346 (13.6)	823 (32.4)	987 (38.9)	707 (27.8)	420 (16.5)	255 (10.0)	54 (2.1)	12 (0.5)	3,748 (147.6)
Average precipitation days (≥ 1 mm)	1	1	2	4	13	22	25	25	20	10	3	1	127
Average relative humidity (%)	72	71	75	78	80	87	89	88	86	82	77	74	80
Mean monthly sunshine hours	259.0	254.2	264.0	262.8	241.0	169.0	149.1	163.5	187.2	240.9	254.0	256.0	2,700.7
Source 1: NOAA
Source 2: Bangladesh Meteorological Department (humidity 1981-2010)

== Demographics ==
Religions in Cox's Bazar city (2022)
Religion	Percent
Islam	90.13%
Hinduism	7.48%
Buddhism	2.13%
Other or not stated	0.26%

According to the 2022 Bangladesh census, Cox's Bazar city had 45,944 households and a population of 196,385. Cox's Bazar had a literacy rate of 81.57%: 83.49% for males and 79.36% for females, and a sex ratio of 114.06 males per 100 females. 10.30% of the population was under 5 years of age.

According to the 2011 Bangladesh census, Cox's Bazar had 31,431 households and a population of 167,477. 38,042 (22.71%) were under 10 years of age. Cox's Bazar had a literacy rate (age 7 and over) of 55.72%, compared to the national average of 51.8%, and a sex ratio of 776 females per 1000 males. Ethnic population is 1,686 (1.01%), of which Rakhine were 1,447.

== Economy ==
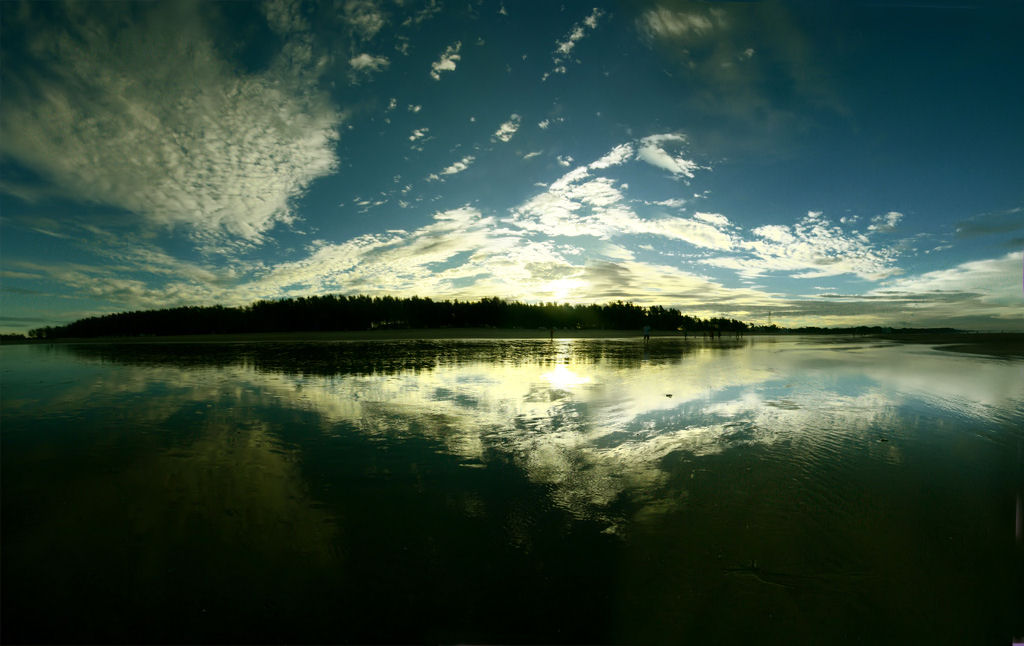
Panorama of Cox's Bazar in the early morning: clouds on a blue sky, still water and forest in the distance.

=== Tourism ===
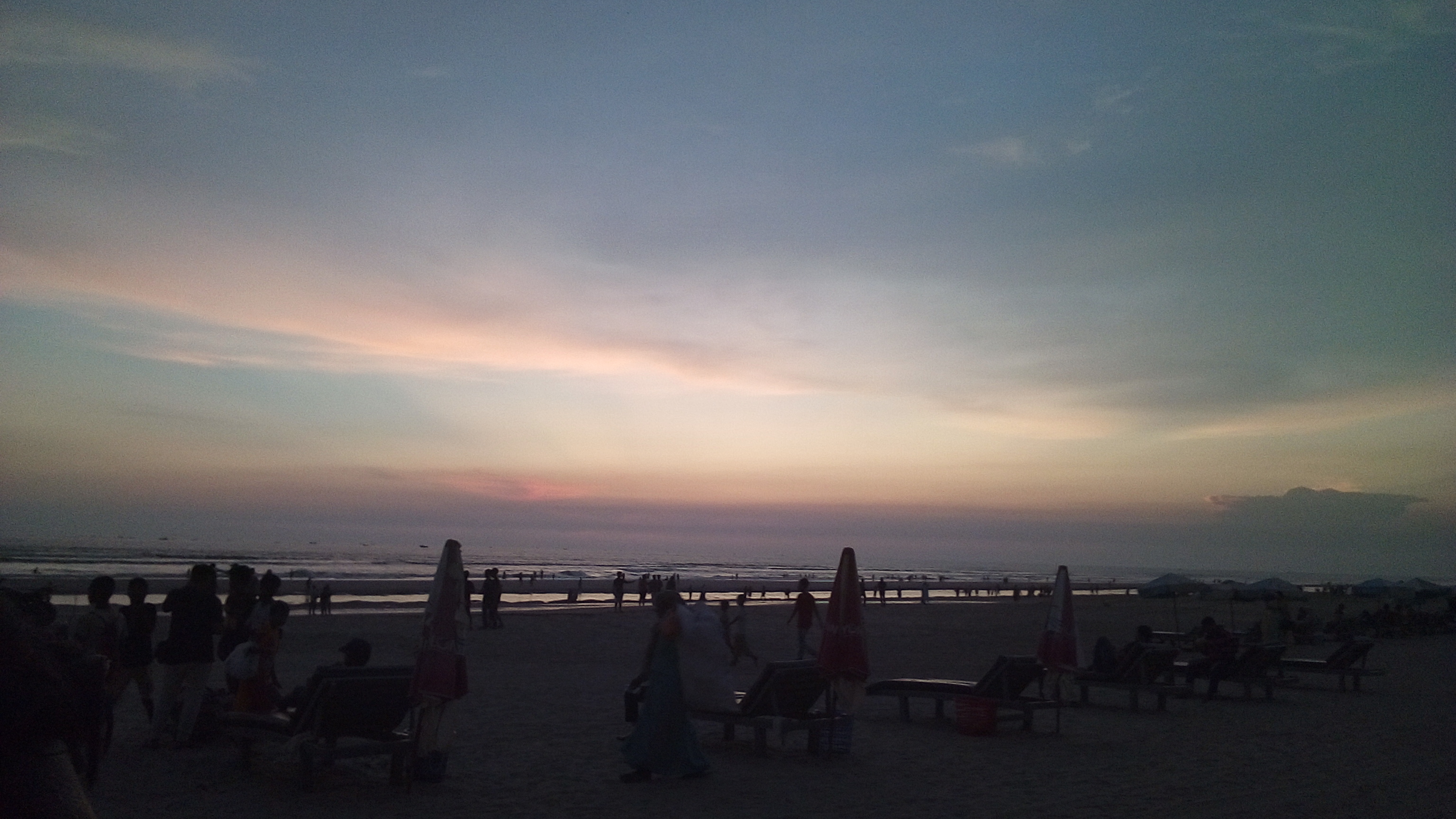
Cox's Bazar (Kolatoli Sea Beach) after sunset

The major economic activity in Cox's Bazar is tourism. A number of hotels, guest houses, and motels have been built in the city and coastal region, and many people are involved in the service industry.

- Cox's Bazar Beach: The beach in Cox's Bazar is the main attraction of the town with an unbroken length of 150 km (93 mi) also termed the "longest natural unbroken sea beach" in the world.
- Himchari National Park: Himchari is located just south of the Cox's Bazar town. It consists of lush tropical rain forest, grasslands and trees, and features a number of waterfalls, the biggest of which cascades down toward the sandy, sun-drenched beach. The National Park was established in 1980 by the government of Bangladesh as a conservation area for research, education, and recreation. Once it was the stomping grounds of herds of Asian elephant. It is still home to a limited number of these mammals.
- Aggmeda Khyang: a large Buddhist monastery, and a place revered by around 400,000 Buddhist people of Cox's Bazar; and the Chittagong Hill Tracts. The main sanctuary is posted on a series of round timber columns. It has a prayer chamber and an assembly hall along with a repository of large and small bronze Buddha images and a number of old manuscripts.
- Ramu: about 10 km (6 mi) from Cox's Bazar, is a village with a sizeable Buddhist population. The village sells handicrafts and homemade cigars. There are monasteries, khyangs and pagodas containing images of Buddha in bronze, gold and other metals with precious stones. One of the temples, on the bank of the Baghkhali River, houses relics and Burmese handicrafts, and also a large bronze statue of Buddha measuring thirteen feet high which rests on a six feet high pedestal. Weavers ply their trade in open workshops and craftsmen make handmade cigars in their pagoda like houses.
- Dulhazra Safari Park: Dulhazra Safari Park is the first safari park in Bangladesh. It was developed on an undulating landscape covering approximately 2,224 acres (9.00 km^{2}) in Chakaria Upazila, Cox's Bazar District. The forest is characterised by tropical evergreen vegetation, rich in Garjan, Boilam, Telsur, and Chapalish, along with various herbs, shrubs, and creepers. The safari park is a designated protected area where animals are kept in a spacious environment that mimics their natural habitat. Visitors can easily observe the animals during their visit, whether by bus, jeep, or on foot. The park was established based on a South Asian model and serves as an extension of an animal sanctuary located along the Chittagong-Cox's Bazar road, about 50 km (30 mi) from Cox's Bazar town. The sanctuary itself protects a significant number of wild elephants native to the area. Within the safari park, domesticated elephants are available for rides. Other animal attractions include lions, Bengal tigers, crocodiles, bears, chitals, and a variety of birds and monkeys.

The only aquarium in Bangladesh is in Cox's Bazar. Attractions also include parasailing, water biking, beach biking, horse riding, Cox Carnival circus show, Daria Nagar Ecopark, numerous architectural attractions, Shishu Parks and numerous photogenic sites. The largest safari park in the country, Dulhazara Safari Park, is nearby. There is a forest reserve, Naf Tourism Park, which also has a cable car planned.

In 2013, the Bangladesh government formed the Tourist Police unit to better protect local and foreign tourists, as well as to look after the nature and wildlife in the tourist spots of Cox's Bazar.

=== Fishing ===
A large number of people are involved in fishing and collecting seafood and sea products for their livelihood. Cox's Bazar is one of the few major spots for aquaculture in Bangladesh. Along with Khulna, it is considered a major source of revenue from foreign exchanges., besides a mix of small-scale agriculture, marine and inland fishing and salt production are other industrial sources that play important roles in the national economy.

== Transportation and Development ==
=== Transportation ===
Submarine Cable Landing Station

==== Road ====
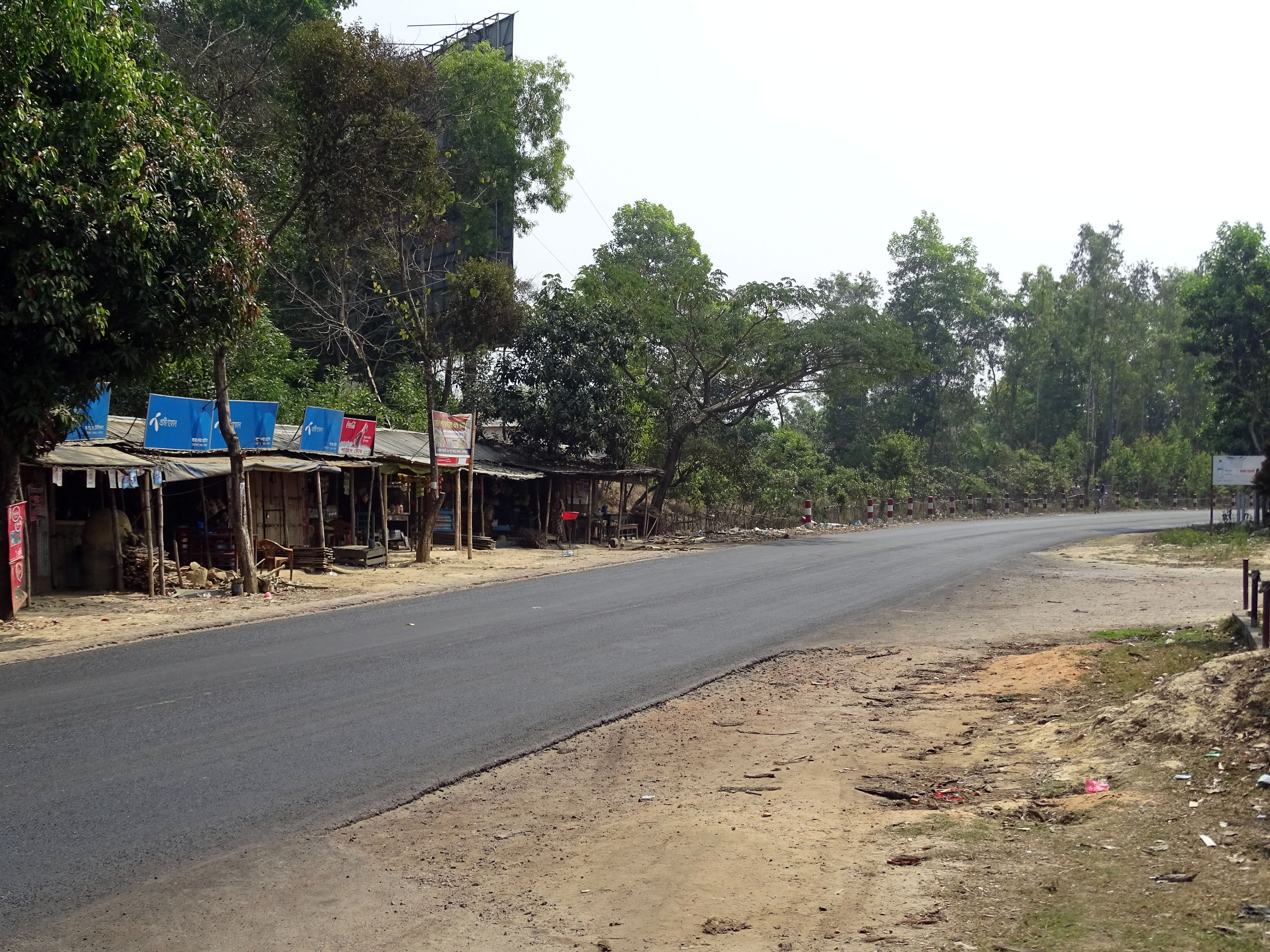
National Highway at Cox's Bazar (N1)

The N110 is the national highway that connects the city with the capital and largest city Dhaka as well as with many other parts of the country via N1. Z1132 works as the alternative gateway from the Eidgaon part of the N1.

Travelling by bus to Cox's Bazar from Dhaka generally takes about 9–12 hours depending on the traffic.

In January 2024, two open-top buses for tourists were launched, travelling from Laboni Point to Sabrang in Teknaf via Marine Drive.

==== Airport ====
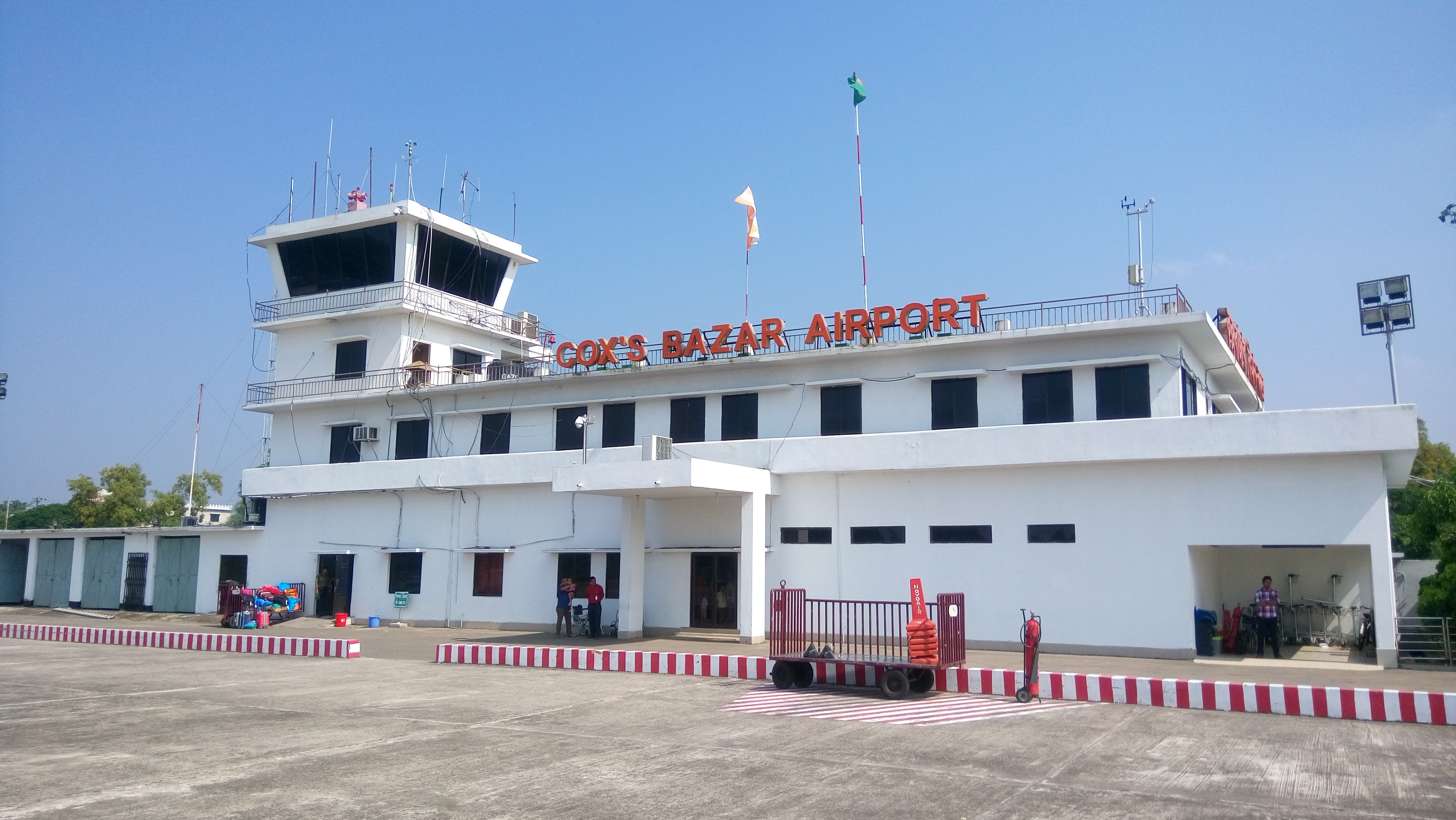
Cox's Bazar Airport Terminal

The city of Cox's Bazar is served by Cox's Bazar International Airport, located northwest of the city. It is one of four Bangladesh's international airports. The main airlines serving the airport are Biman Bangladesh Airlines, US-Bangla Airlines and Novoair. In November 2020, Biman Bangladesh Airlines started flights between Sylhet and Cox's Bazar, which was the first direct flight between two cities without any connecting flight from Dhaka. Cox's Bazar Airport is in the process of being upgraded by 15 July 2025 to an international airport in order to attract more tourists. This will make it the fourth international airport in Bangladesh.

==== Rail ====
Cox's Bazar railway station

The Cox's Bazar railway station is the main railway station of the district, providing trains on the Chittagong–Cox's Bazar line operated by the state-run Bangladesh Railway. This station also provides trains that run from Dhaka, such as the Cox's Bazaar Express. On 11 November 2023, Prime Minister Sheikh Hasina inaugurated the Cox's Bazar railway station. The station was opened to the public on 1 December 2023.

==== Sea ====
Nuniarchara has a jetty port for transport by sea.

=== Development ===
==== Education ====
1962: Cox's Bazar Government College is the earliest secondary and bachelor's degree offering college founded in Cox's Bazar.
1985: Cox's Bazar Law College is the first profession-based college founded in this district.
1991: Cox's Bazar Govt. Women's College is the first Secondary and bachelor's degree offering college in this district solely for women.
2006: Cox's Bazar Commerce College is the First College only for Business Studies, Humanities and Business Management.
2008: Cox's Bazar Medical College is the first medical college in this district.
2013: Cox's Bazar International University is founded as the first private university in the district.

Other colleges in this area include Cox's Bazar Polytechnic Institute, Cox's Bazar Technical School and College, Nursing & Midwifery College, Cox's Bazar, Cox's Bazar City College, Cox's Bazar DC College, Uttaran Model College Cox's Bazar, Cox's Bazar Harvard International College, BKSP RAMU Cox's Bazar, Ramu Cantonment Public School & College, Ramu Government College, Ukhiya Degree College, Women's College Ukhiya, Teknaf Government College, Moin Uddin Memorial College Nelah Teknaf, and many more.

High schools include Cox's Bazar Govt. High School, Cox's Bazar Govt. Girl's High School, Cox's Bazar Model High School, Bheola Manik Char High School, Ramu Cantonment English School, Ramu Khizari Govt. High School, Biam Laboratory School and College, Kishalaya Model High School, Chakaria korak biddyapith, Chakaria Govt. High School, Palong Model High School, Shilkhali High School, Pekua, Ukhiya Govt. High School, Nheela High School, Poura Preparatory High School, and Sheikh Hasina Joarianala Girls High School.

==== Others ====
Cox's Bazar Lighthouse
- Location: Cox's Bazar; Bangladesh
- Coordinates: 21°25′53″N 91°58′42″E

Tower
- Foundation: concrete base
- Construction: metal skeletal tower
- Height: 7 metres (23 ft)
- Shape: square prism skeletal tower with balcony and lantern
- Markings: white tower, orange lantern
- Operator: Bangladesh Department of Shipping

Light
- Focal height: 54 metres (177 ft)
- Range: 21 nautical miles (39 km; 24 mi)
- Characteristic: Fl W 15s.

In April 2007, as Bangladesh was connected to the submarine cable network as a member of the SEA-ME-WE-4 Consortium, Cox's Bazar was selected as the landing station of the submarine cable

== Gallery ==
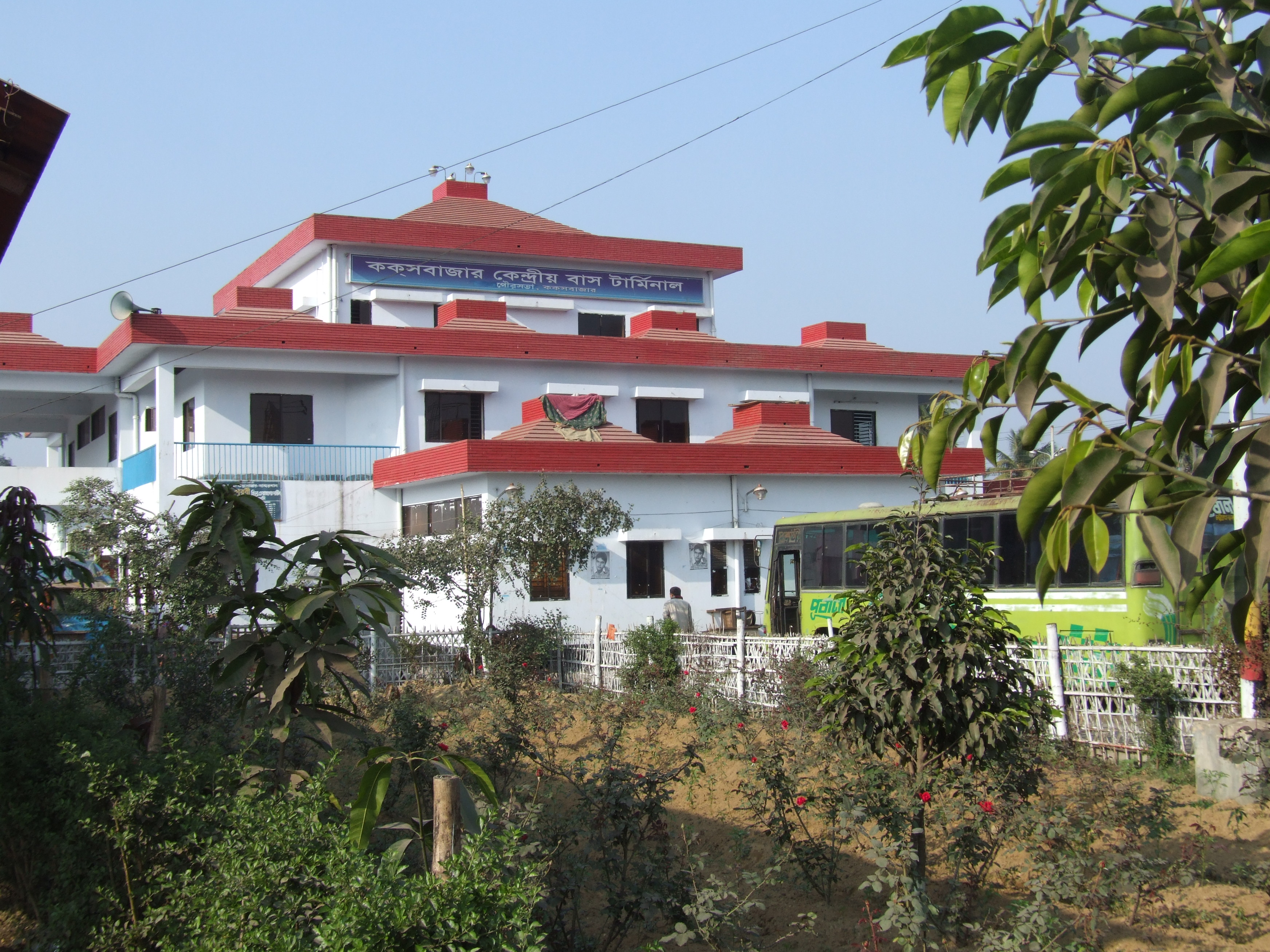
Cox's Bazar bus terminal

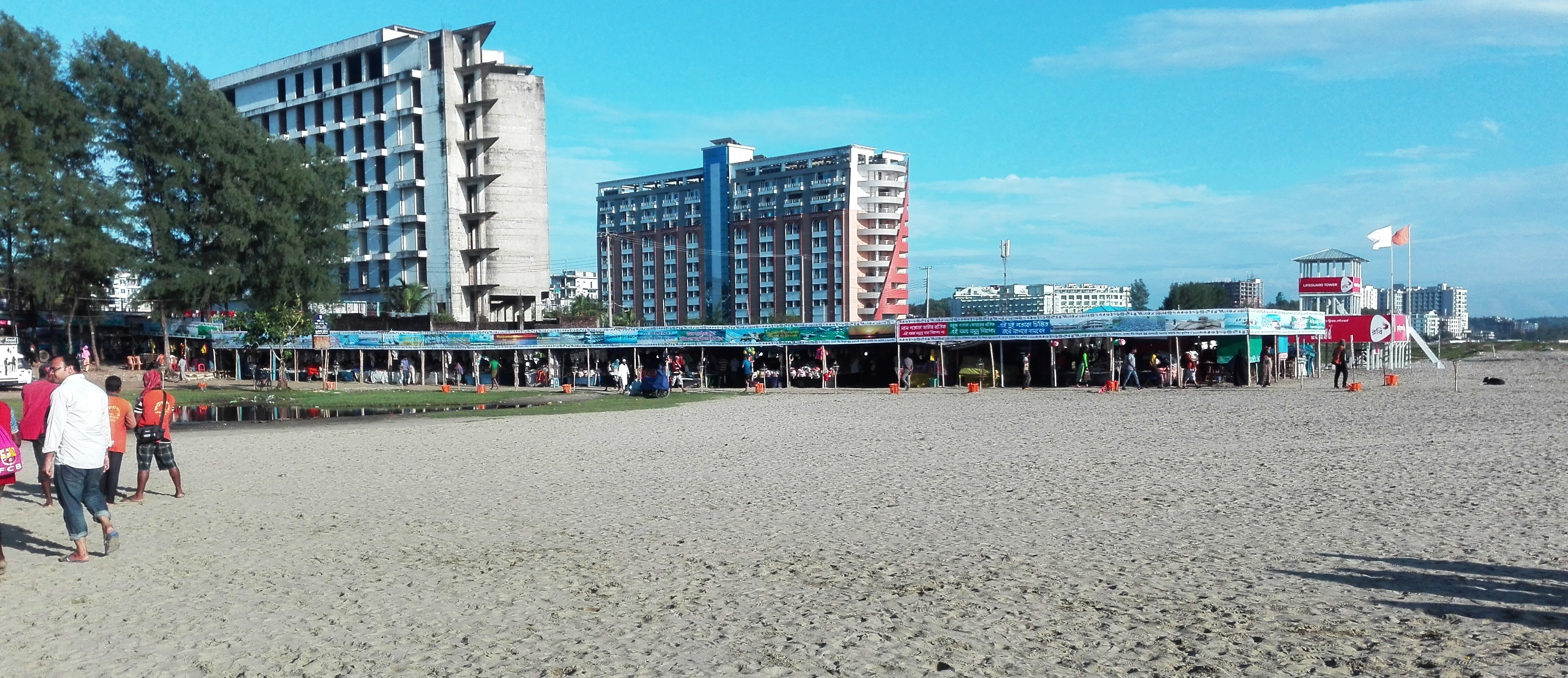
Town view at Sugondha point

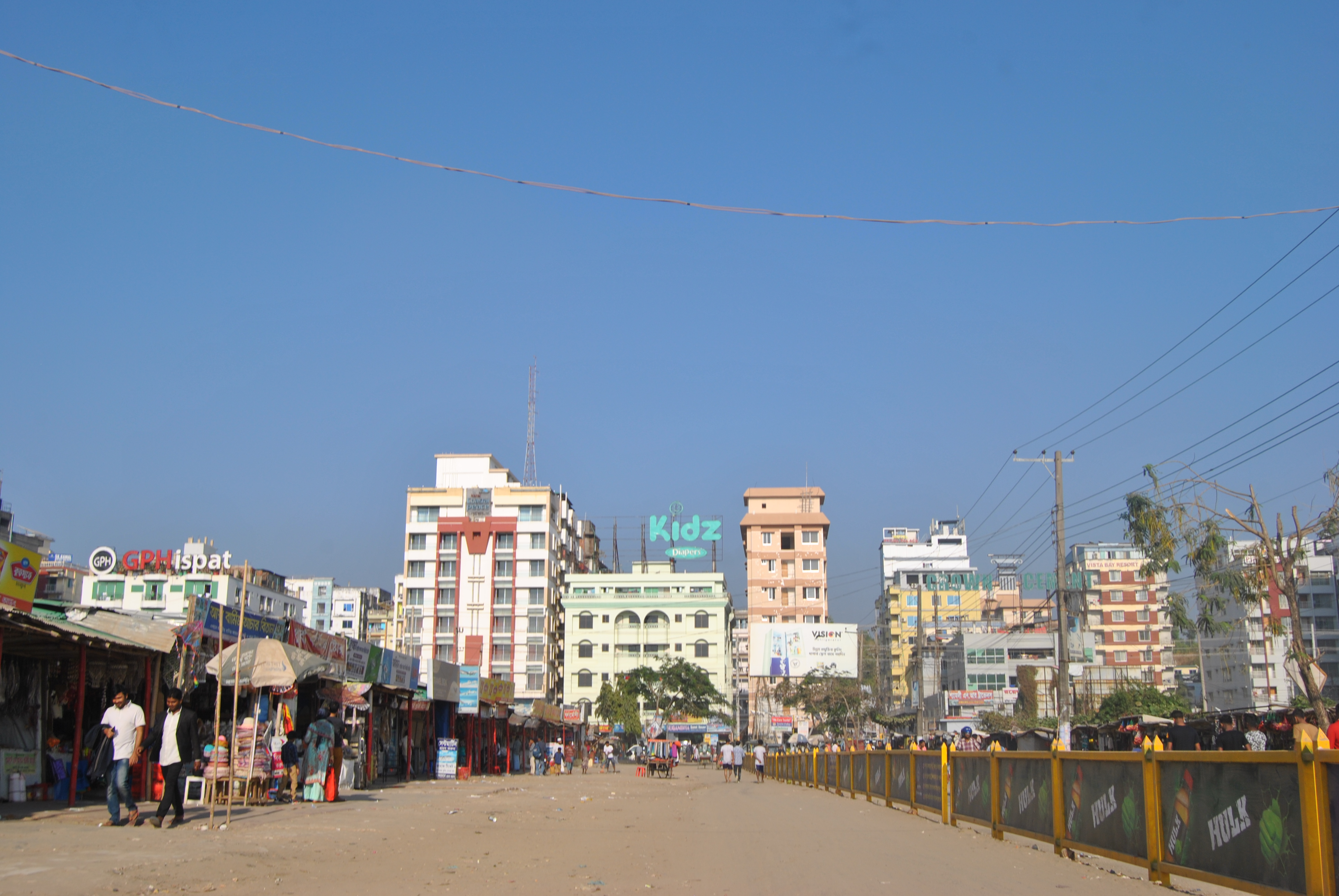
Beach area

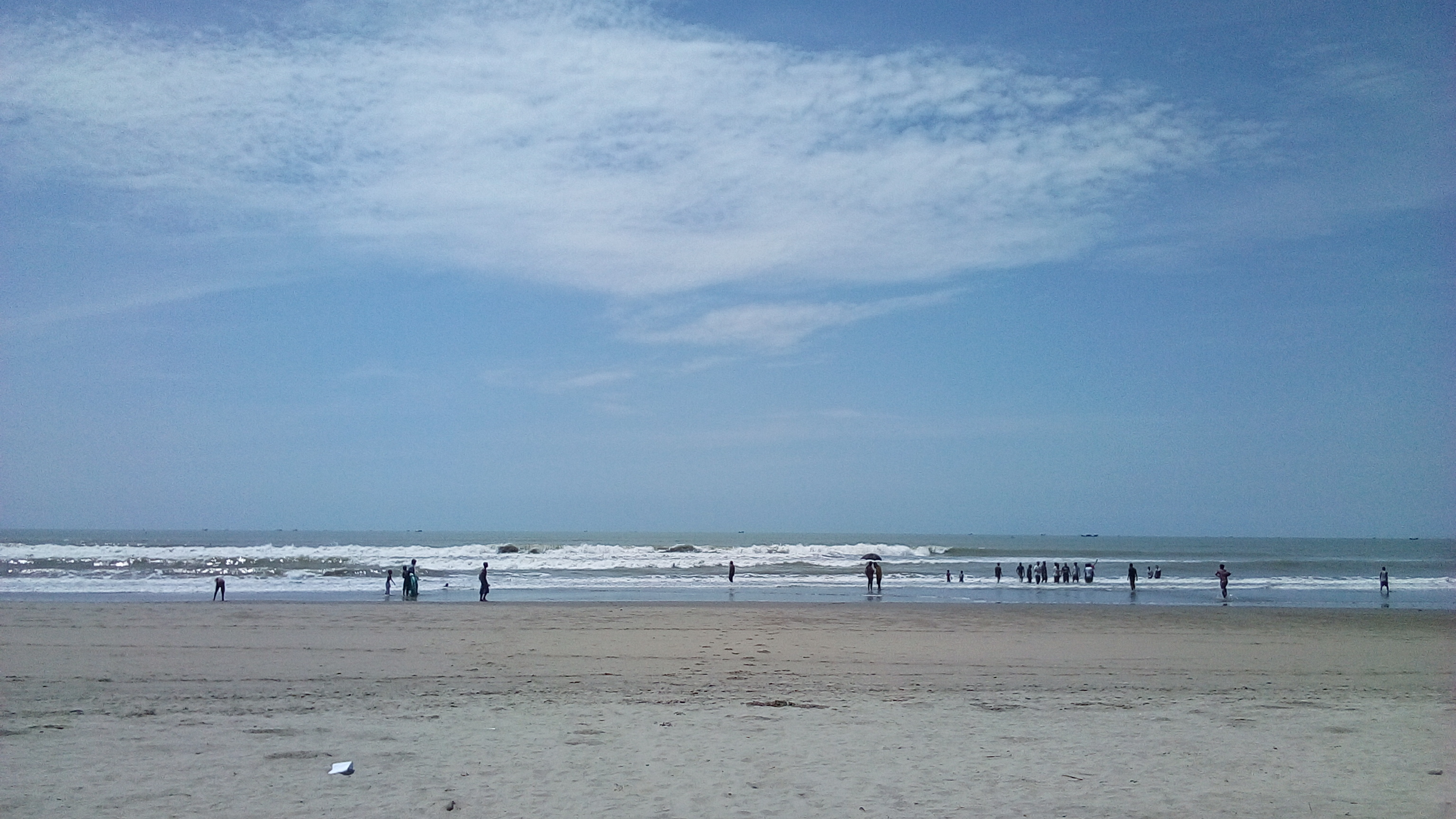
Cox's Bazar in daylight

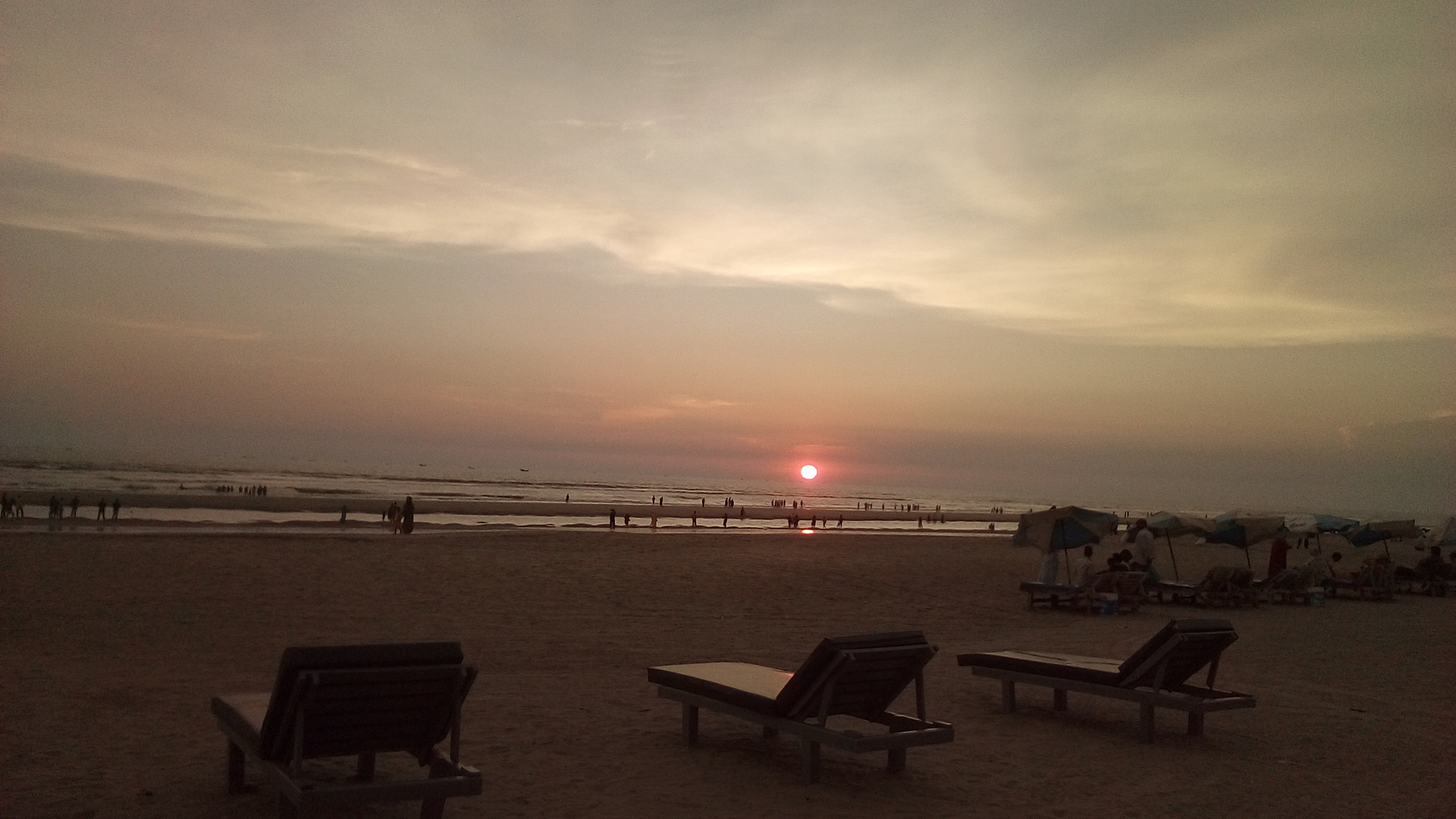
Cox's Bazar Sea Beach

== See also ==
- Cox's Bazar Sadar Upazila
- List of lighthouses in Bangladesh
- Mermaid Beach Resort
