= Bayt al-mal =

Royal treasury in old Islamic states

Bayt al-mal (بيت المال) is an Arabic term that is translated as "House of money" or "House of wealth". Historically, it was a financial institution responsible for the administration of taxes in Islamic states; particularly in the early Islamic Caliphate, it functioned as something of a mix between a Central Bank and a Treasury. It was managed by the caliphs and sultans, in dealing with the personal finances of muslim citizens and government expenditures. Furthermore, it administered the investment of zakat revenues into public affairs and private muslim endeavors, as well as distributing jizya to the islamic populace.

== History ==
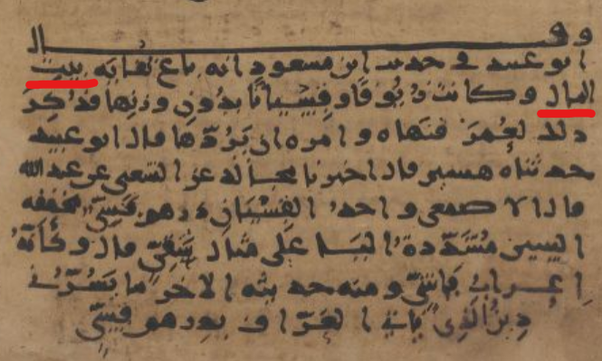
An early physical copy that mentions Bayt Al-Maal, highlighted in red. From the hadith manuscript MS. Leiden Or. 298, dated 866 CE.

Bayt al-mal was the department that dealt with the revenues and all other economical matters of the state. In the time of Muhammad, there was no permanent Bait-ul-Mal or public treasury. Whatever revenues or other amounts were received were distributed immediately. The last receipt during the life of the Prophet was a tribute from Bahrain amounting to 800000 dirham which was distributed in just one sitting. There were no salaries to be paid, and there was no state expenditure. Hence the need for the treasury at public level was not felt. In the time of Abu Bakr as well there was no treasury. Abu Bakr earmarked a house where all money was kept on receipt. As all money was distributed immediately the treasury generally remained locked up. At the time of the death of Abu Bakr, there was only one dirham in the public treasury.

According to Rahman, the word 'bayt mal al-muslimin' (or 'bayt mal-Allah') referred originally to the building in early Muslim history where war spoils and other public properties of the caliphate were stored and re-distributed to the community, but over time the term evolved to refer to the societal institution owning such public properties of the Muslims, and hence encompasses the authority in control of the state's public revenue and expenditures.

=== Establishment of Bait-ul-Maal ===
In the time of Umar, things changed. With the extension in conquests money came in larger quantities, Umar also allowed salaries to men fighting in the army. Abu Huraira, who was the Governor of Bahrain, sent a revenue of five hundred thousand dirhams. Umar summoned a meeting of his Consultative Assembly and sought the opinion of the Companions about the disposal of the money. Uthman ibn Affan advised that the amount should be kept for future needs. Walid bin Hisham suggested that like the Byzantines, separate departments of Treasury and Accounts should be set up.

After consulting the Companions, Umar decided to establish the Central Treasury at Madinah. Abdullah bin Arqam was appointed as the Treasury Officer. He was assisted by Abdur Rahman bin Awf and Muiqib. A separate Accounts Department was also set up and it was required to maintain record of all that was spent. Later, provincial treasuries were set up in the provinces. After meeting the local expenditure, the provincial treasuries were required to remit the surplus amount to the central treasury at Madinah. According to Yaqubi, the salaries and stipends charged to the central treasury amounted to over 30 million dirhams.

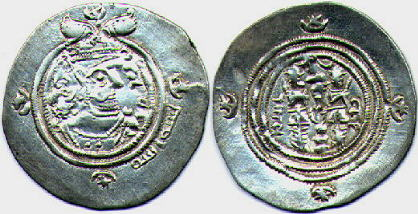
The coins were of Persian origin, and had an image of the last Persian emperor, Muslim added the sentence Bismillah to it.

A separate building was constructed for the royal treasury by the name bait ul maal, which in large cities was guarded by as many as 400 guards. In most of the historical accounts, it states that among the Rashidun caliphs, Uthman ibn Affan was first to strike the coins, some accounts however states that Umar was first to do so. When Persia was conquered, three types of coins were current in the conquered territories, namely Baghli which weighed 8 daniq; Tabari which weighed 4 daniq; and Maghribi which weighed 3 daniq. Umar (or according to some accounts Uthman) made an innovation and struck an Islamic dirham which weighed 6 daniq.

=== Charity ===
The concepts of welfare and pension were introduced in early Islamic law as forms of Zakat (charity), one of the Five Pillars of Islam, under the Rashidun Caliphate in the 7th century. This practice continued well into the Abbasid era of the Caliphate. The taxes (including Zakat and Jizya) collected in the treasury of an Islamic government were used to provide income for the needy, including the poor, elderly, orphans, widows, and the disabled. According to the Islamic jurist Al-Ghazali (Algazel, 1058–1111), the government was also expected to stockpile food supplies in every region in case a disaster or famine occurred. Thus, according to Shadi Hamid, the Caliphate can be considered the world's first major "welfare state".

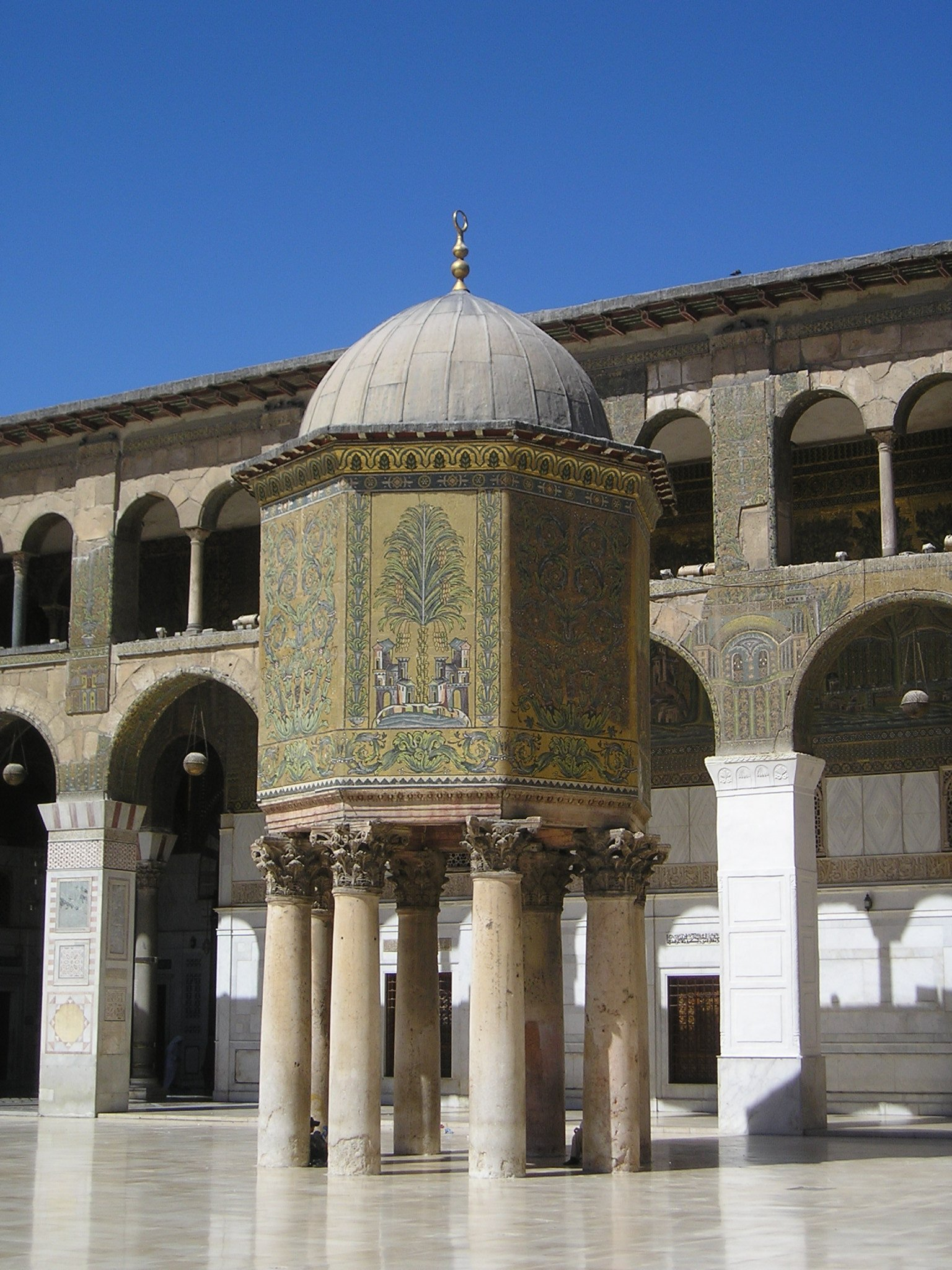
Dome of the treasury at The Umayyad Mosque in Damascus

During the Rashidun Caliphate, various welfare programs were introduced by Caliph Umar. Umar himself lived "a simple life and detached himself from any of the worldly luxuries," like how he often wore "worn-out shoes and was usually clad in patched-up garments," or how he would sleep "on the bare floor of the mosque." Limitations on wealth were also set for governors and officials, who would often be "dismissed if they showed any outward signs of pride or wealth which might distinguish them from the people." This was an early attempt at erasing "class distinctions which might inevitably lead to conflict." Umar also made sure that the public treasury was not wasted on "unnecessary luxuries" as he believed that "the money would be better spent if it went towards the welfare of the people rather than towards lifeless bricks."

Umar's innovative welfare reforms during the Rashidun Caliphate included the introduction of social security. In the Rashidun Caliphate, whenever citizens were injured or lost their ability to work, it became the state's responsibility to make sure that their minimum needs were met, with the unemployed and their families receiving an allowance from the public treasury. Retirement pensions were provided to elderly people, who had retired and could "count on receiving a stipend from the public treasury." Babies who were abandoned were also taken care of, with one hundred dirhams spent annually on each orphan’s development. Umar also introduced the concept of public trusteeship and public ownership when he implemented the Waqf, or charitable trust, system, which transferred "wealth from the individual or the few to a social collective ownership," in order to provide "services to the community at large." For example, Umar brought land from the Banu Harithah and converted it into a charitable trust, which meant that "profit and produce from the land went towards benefiting the poor, slaves, and travelers."

During the great famine of 18 AH (638 CE), Umar introduced further reforms, such as the introduction of food rationing using coupons, which were given to those in need and could be exchanged for wheat and flour. Another innovative concept that was introduced was that of a poverty threshold, with efforts made to ensure a minimum standard of living, making sure that no citizen across the empire would suffer from hunger. In order to determine the poverty line, Umar ordered an experiment to test how many seers of flour would be required to feed a person for a month. He found that 25 seers of flour could feed 30 people, and so he concluded that 50 seers of flour would be sufficient to feed a person for a month. As a result, he ordered that the poor each receive a food ration of fifty seers of flour per month. In addition, the poor and disabled were guaranteed cash stipends. However, in order to avoid some citizens taking advantage of government services, "begging and laziness were not tolerated" and "those who received government benefits were expected to be contributing members in the community."

Further reforms later took place under the Umayyad Caliphate. Registered soldiers who were disabled in service received an invalidity pension, while similar provisions were made for disabled people and poor in general. Caliph Al-Walid I assigned payments and services to the needy, which included money for the poor, guides for the blind, and servants for the crippled, and pensions for all disabled people so that they would never need to beg. The caliphs Al-Walid II and Umar ibn Abdul-Aziz supplied money and clothes to the blind and crippled, as well as servants for the latter. This continued with the Abbasid caliph Al-Mahdi. Tahir ibn Husayn, governor of the Khurasan province of the Abbasid Caliphate, states in a letter to his son that pensions from the treasury should be provided to the blind, to look after the poor and destitute in general, to make sure not to overlook victims of oppression who are unable to complain and are ignorant of how to claim their rights, and that pensions should be assigned to victims of calamities and the widows and orphans they leave behind. The "ideal city" described by the Islamic philosophers, Al-Farabi and Avicenna, also assigns funds to disabled people.

When communities were stricken by famine, rulers would often support them though measures such as the remission of taxes, importation of food, and charitable payments, ensuring that everyone had enough to eat. However, private charity through the Waqf trust institution often played a greater role in the alleviation of famines than government measures did. From the 9th century, funds from the treasury were also used towards the Waqf (charitable trusts) for the purpose of building and supporting public institutions, often Madrassah educational institutions and Bimaristan hospitals.

== See also ==
- Islamic economics in the world
- Early social changes under Islam
  - Reforms of Umar's era
