= Shah Keyamuddin Faruqi Al-Madani =

Islamic scholar (1712/1713–1790)

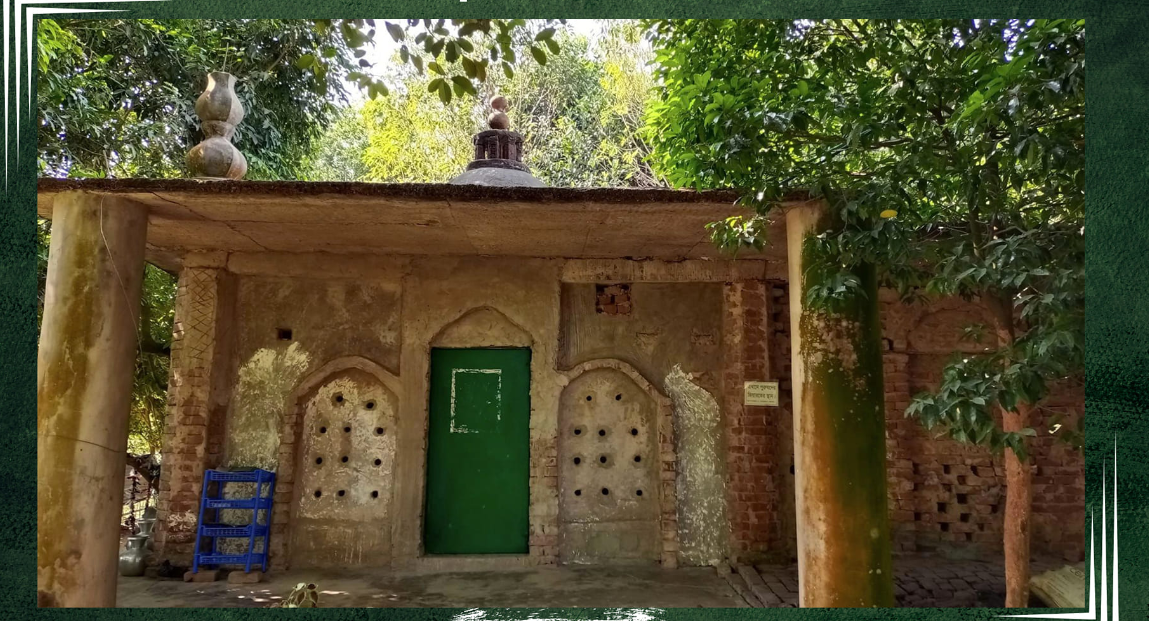
- Shrine of Shah Keyamuddin Faruqi Al-Madani

Personal life
- Born: 1124 AH (1712/1713 AD) Medina, Ottoman Empire (present-day Saudi Arabia)
- Died: 17 February 1790 (13 Falgun 1152 Moghi / 1156 AH) Sonai Pahar, Mustannagar, Mirsharai Upazila, Chittagong, Bengal Presidency
- Resting place: Jamgachhtal, South Sonai Pahad, Mustannagar, Mirsarai, Chittagong, Bangladesh
- Spouse: Unnamed
- Children: 9 (6 daughters including Rokaiya, 3 sons)
- Parent: Hazrat Alimuddin Khan (Father)
- Notable work: Rasulnoma
- Known for: Spreading Islam and Sufism in Bengal Presidency, author of "Rasulnoma", spiritual guide Pir of poet Ali Raza (Kanu Shah)
- Occupation: Islamic Scholar, Sufi Saint, Preacher

Religious life
- Religion: Islam
- Denomination: Sunni Islam
- Order: Chishti Order, Naqshbandi Order, Madariyya
- Lineage: Umar

Muslim leader
- Teacher: Shah Amanat
- Students: Ali Raza (Kanu Shah), Shah Sufi Kala Mustan, Shah Sufi Keyamuddin Kala, Shah Sufi Kalu Fakir, Hazrat Chinki Shah

Shah Keyamuddin Faruqi Al-Madani was an 18th-century Islamic scholar and Sufi figure. He was as a deputy (khalifa) of Sufi saint Shah Amanat. He came from Medina, and traveled to Bihar before settling in Mirsharai Upazila, Chittagong. His areas of study included Tafsir, Hadith and Hanafi Jurisprudence (Fiqh). He was also the spiritual teacher of Ali Raza. Keymauddin authored the booklet "Rasulnoma" which describes the physical attributes of Muhammad. A preserved copy of his booklet Rasulnoma, detailing the physical attributes of Muhammad, is kept at the Nuriya Bishu Darbar Sharif located in Chittagong.

== Early life and education ==
Shah Keyamuddin Faruqi Al-Madani was born around 1124 AH (c.1712 CE). He was the youngest son of Alimuddin Khan, a descendant of Umar, the second Caliph of Islam. He was born approximately 6 to 7 kilometers northeast of Medina. He received his primary education from his father. In Mecca, he earned a certificate (Sanad) in Hanafi jurisprudence from local scholars and pursued higher studies by attending lectures on Hadith and Tafsir at Al-Masjid-an-NAbawi in Medina. Later he returned to Medina and married off. He had six daughters and three sons. After his marriage, Keyamuddin began teaching Hadith, Tafsir and Hanafi jurisprudence (Fiqh). During this period, he traveled through Iraq, Iran, Jordan and Palestine to deliver religious lessons and propagate Islamic teachings.

== Background to the propagation and spread of Islam and Tasawwuf ==
He left his five daughters and three sons in Medina and migrated to India for Tabligh (religious preaching) and Sufi practice. Later, he reached Bihar and took the oath of spiritual allegiance (Bay'ah) in the Chishti Order and Naqshbandi Order under Shah Amanat. As per his Master Shah Amanat's instructions, Keyamuddin established a Khanqah on the banks of the Sone River in Jharkhand and engaged in religious preaching.

Although he is native speaker of Arabic, Urdu and Persian, his initial preaching faced language barriers. For this, he advised by his spiritual master to acquired proficiency in the Bengali language and local culture, as well as Hindu texts. He succeeded in a very short time to outreach the people through his humility, local engagement and Karamat (spiritual miracles) described by his followers. By this time, the Sonepur Khanqah developed into an active regional spiritual center. In 1771 (1178 BS), rebellions against British Colonial rule were launched by local tribes in Jharkhand. These led to the outbreak of regional turmoil and communal violence including the local Muslim minority. According to local historic sources, the rebel wanted Keyamuddin to leave the area in exchange for communal stability. Local Muslims refused to do so. As a result, the rebels decided to kill Keyamuddin.

In the same year, Keyamuddin had a vision of his spiritual master Shah Amanat and Muhammad according to tradition. In the vision he was instructed to migrate to East Bengal to convey spiritual lineage. That same night right after seeing this vision, Keyamuddin traveled via the Sone River to the estuary of the Feni River. His wife and daughter Rokaiya later joined him there. He eventually settled in Hajigaon (present-day Hajishwrai village in Durgapur Union (Mirsharai), located south of the Feni River.

Shah Keyamuddin migrated to East Bengal that very night to deliver the spiritual trust (Amanat) that bestowed upon him by the The Prophet Muhammad and his Pir, Shah Amanat, to its designated location. His wife later joined him there along his daughter Rokaiya. He eventually settled in Hajishwrai village (present-day Durgapur Union (Mirsharai)), which was then known as Hajigaon, located south of Feni.

In the research work "Mawaqiyun Nujum", scholar Maulana Mir Muhammad Moinuddin Noori Siddique AL-Quraishi noted that Keyamuddin's settlement was located the south of the Feni River. His disciple Ali Raza provided a exact geographical description in his poetic work "Gyan-Sagar" regarding the residence of Keyamuddin.The verse states:

"Fenir dokkhine ek shohor opam,,
Hajigaon korchilo shei desher nam.
Shei Shubho grame chilo tahar bosoti,
Shei pir chorone mor shohosro pronoti."

In historical context, Maulana Mir Muhammad Moinuddin Noori Siddiqui AL-Quraishi identified the area named "Hajighaon"-described by Ali Raza-as present-day Baraiyarhat, Mustannagar, or the Sonai Pahar region within Mirsharai Upazila, Chittagong. This place also historically referred to as Hajisarai or Habigaon. This identification also offered a perspective regarding this discussions surrounding Keyamuddin's historical settlement.

Later Kalu Shah, Kala Shah and Chinki Shah took the oath of Bay'ah (spiritual allegiance) under Keyamuddin in that location . His prominent deputies (khalifas) included Kalu Shah, Kala Mustan Shah, Keyamuddin Kala, Chinki Shah, Lala Shah and Ali Raza (known as Kanu Shah). During a land survey conducted by local rulers (nawabs), he was offered land properties; however, he declined to accept them in his own name. Consequently, the land was registered in the name of his companion, Kala Mastan Shah, which came to be known as "Kalar Taluk". Present-day Mustannagar in Mirsarai Upazila was named after Kala Mustan.

In early 1772 AD (1st Kartik 1179 NS / 1134 <Moghi), he initiated Shah Sufi Ali Raza Kanu Shah into Bay'ah (spiritual allegiance) at the age of 13. Keyamuddin took a job as a teacher at a local landlord residence west of Lalanagar Bazar and at the same time he was instructing Ali Raza in formal religious studies. Sometime in 1784 (1145 or 1146 Moghi), Keyamuddin granted Ali Raza khilafat (spiritual succession) and Ijazah (authorization) and ordered to pursue an ascetic lifestyle. Later Keyamuddin returned to Mirsharai Upazila. Afterwards, Keyamuddin handed over the administration of the Khanqah to Kala Musten and entrusted his spiritual succession to Ali Raza and Keyamuiddin devoted himself entirely to prayer and spiritual devotions.

== Succession and the Caliphs ==
Keyamuddin Faruqi Al-Madani appointed several deputies (khalifas) to promote his spiritual philosophy and propagate the Sufi order. His prominent deputies included:

- Keyamuddin Kala
- Kalu Fakir
- Ali Raza (Kanu Shah)
- Chinki Shah
- Kala Mastan Shah

Following Keyamuddin's death, Ali Raza succeeded him as his spiritual successor and head (gaddinashin) of the order.

== Gallery ==
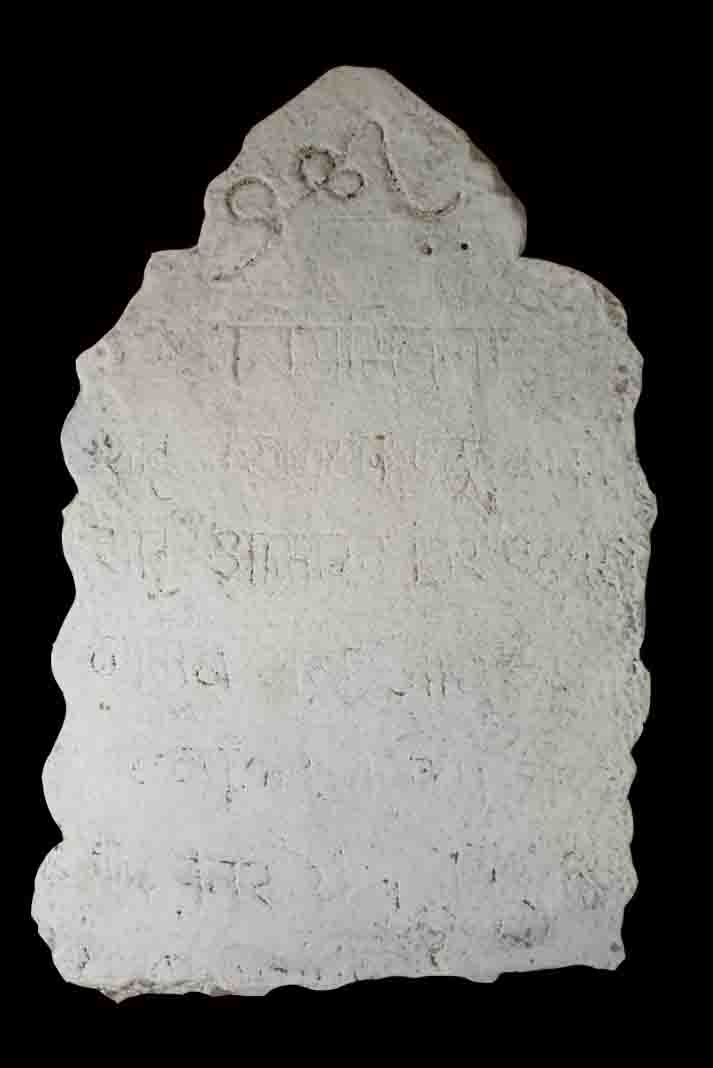
The inscription preserved at the shrine of Hazrat Shah Keyamuddin Faruqi Al-Madani

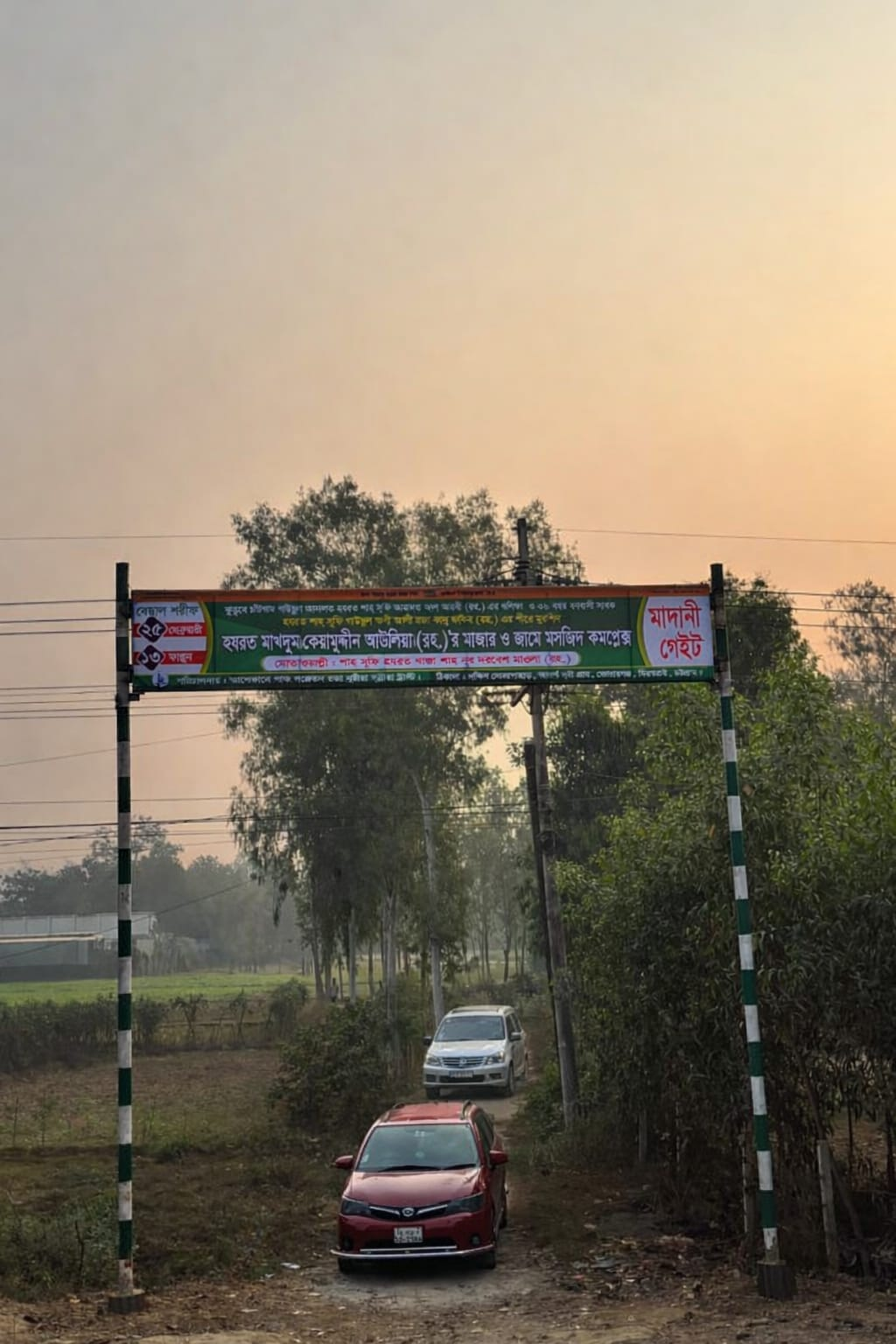
The Madani Gate of the shrine of Keyamuddin Auliya, located at Mastan Nagar in Mirsharai on the eastern side of the Dhaka-Chattogram Highway

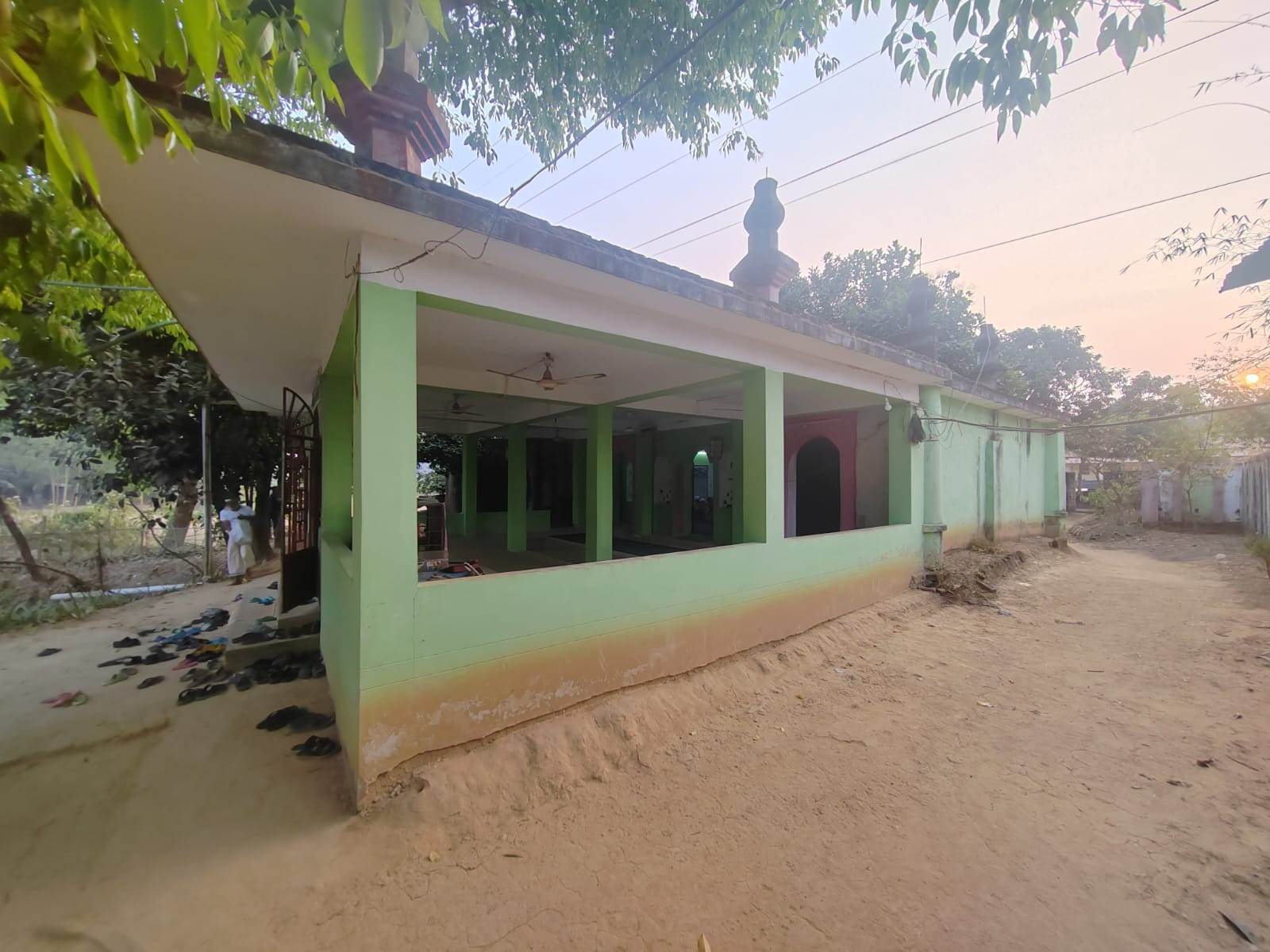
The entrance to the mosque at the shrine of Hazrat Makhdum Allama Shah Keyamuddin Faruqi Al-Madani

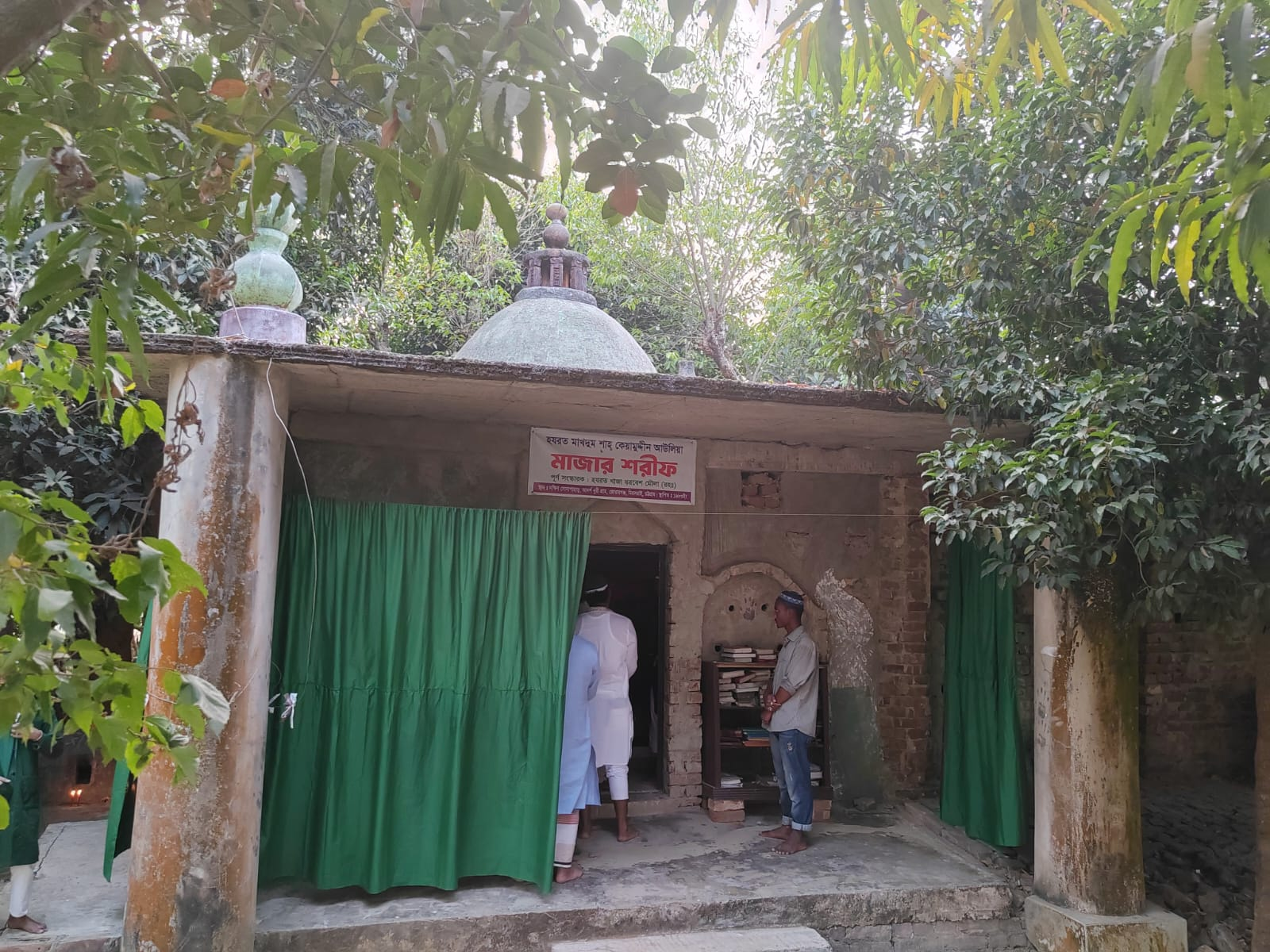
The entrance to the shrine of Hazrat Makhdum Allama Shah Keyamuddin Faruqi Al-Madani

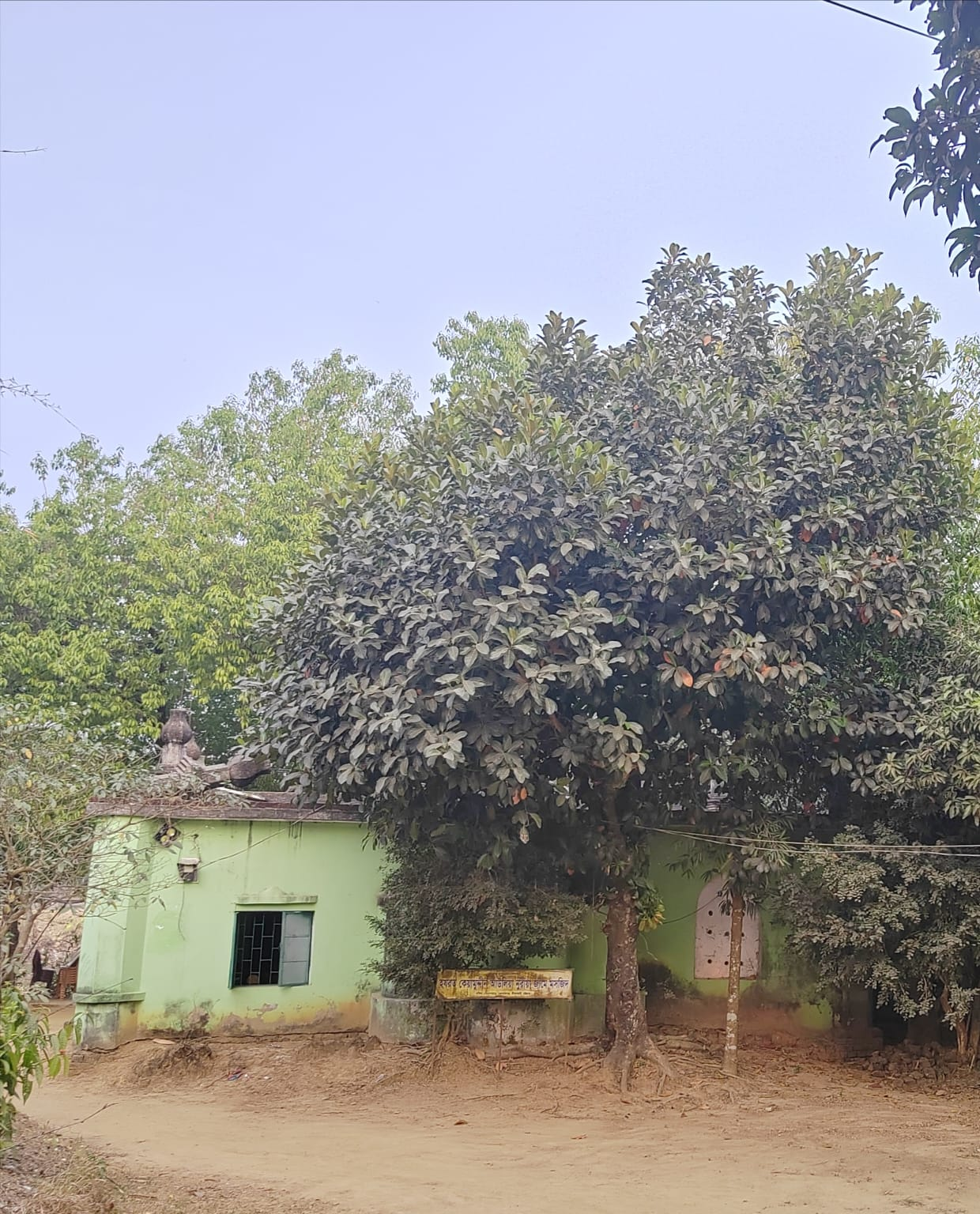
Makhdum Shah Kayamuddin Awliya Nuriya Jame Mosque

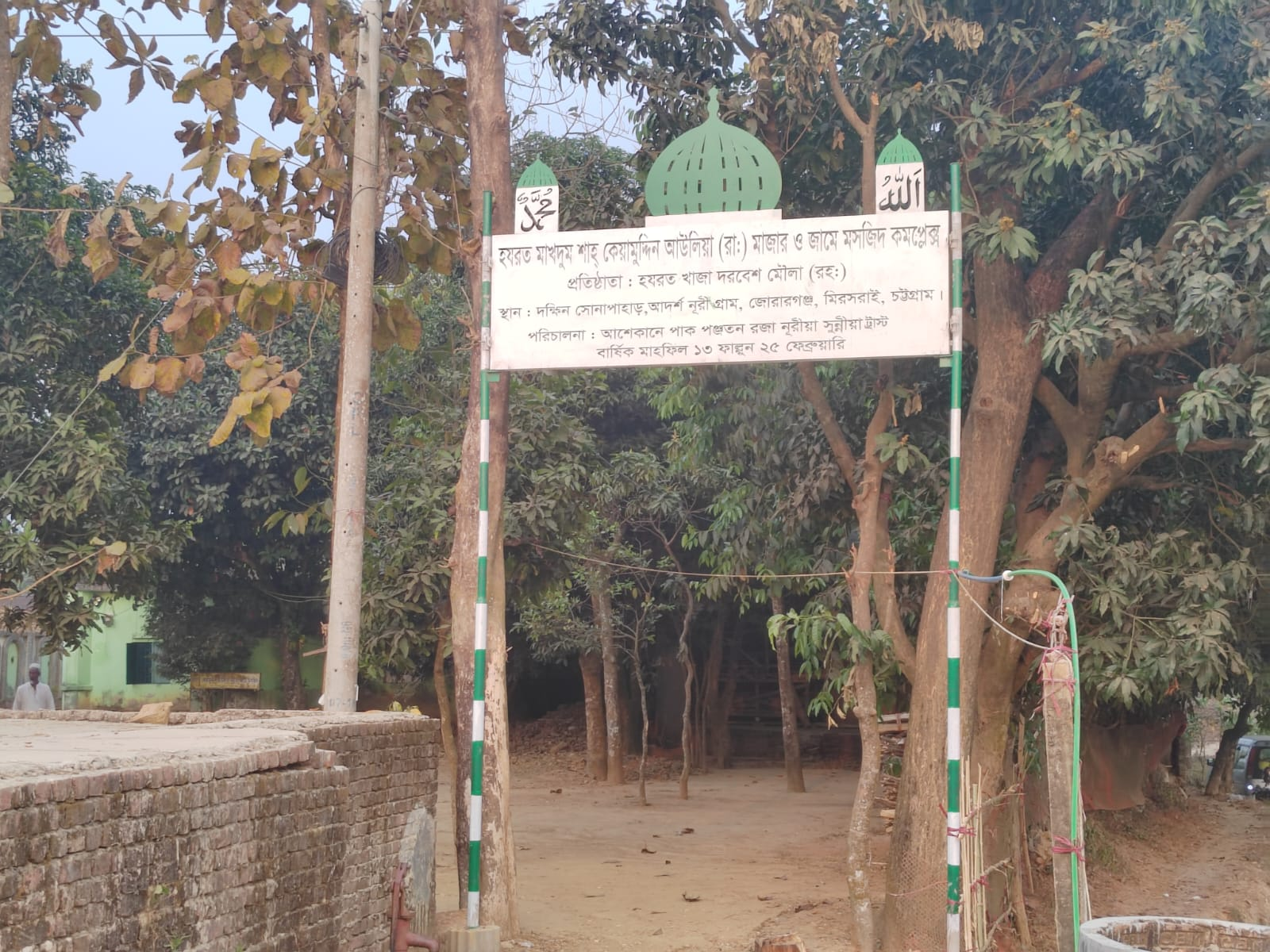
The entrance gate of the shrine and mosque complex of Hazrat Makhdum Allama Shah Keyamuddin Faruqi Al-Madani

== Kala Mustan in the service of his Master Keyamuddin ==
Kala Mustan Shah built a small cell (hujra) on a hill east of Mustannagar in Mirsharai Upazila. Keyamuddin spent his remaining years engaged in worship at this location, which later to be known as Makhdum Shah Sufi Keyamuddin Aulia Complex.

== Death ==
Keyamuddin died on 13 Falgun 1152 Maghi (c. 1790 CE). His annual *Fateha Sharif* is observed on 13 Falgun (25 February) at Jamgachhtal in South Sonai Pahar, Mustannagar, Mirsarai. At this site, Nurul Rashid Akhter Shah Noor Siddiqui (popularly known as Darvesh Nauka), a descendant of Ali Raza, later renovated a local mosque, madrasa and the shrine complex.
