= Islam: The Straight Path =

Book by John L. Esposito

- Islam: The Straight Path third edition cover
- Author: John Esposito
- Language: English
- Genre: Islamic studies
- Publisher: Oxford University Press
- Publication date: 2005

Islam: The Straight Path is an Islamic studies book that aims to give an introduction to Islam. The book, authored by John Esposito, was first published in 1988 by the Oxford University Press.

== Contents ==
The book consists of 6 chapters:

1. Muhammad and the Quran: Messenger and Message
2. The Muslim Community in History
3. Religious Life: Belief and Practice
4. Modern Interpretations of Islam
5. Contemporary Islam: Religion and Politics
6. Islam and Change: Issues of Authority and Interpretation

The first three chapters give a presentation of standard subjects covered in the history of Islam. The first chapter discusses the Islamic prophet Muhammad and the Muslim holy scripture, the Quran. The chapters also cover social realities of the early Muslim community, as well as Islam's cultural and political expansion during the Caliphate and Sultanate periods. Muslim fundamental tenets of belief and practices are also discussed as is the development of Islamic theology, law and Sufism.

Esposito wrote this book after he observed that most books on Islam gave less attention to the modern period than to the pre-modern Islam. Thus, Islam: The Straight Path devotes half its content (the last three chapters) to the development of Islam in modern and reformist times.

In addition to the main text of the book, a full auxiliary information is also provided by notes, a select bibliography, a glossary of largely Arabic terminology and a comprehensive index.

The book also has many brief case studies, that are aimed at exemplifying the themes and issues embodied in contemporary Muslim experience. William Swatos, from Black Hawk College, writes that these concise analyses are one of the book's most important contributions.

=== Muhammad and the Quran: Messenger and Message ===
The first chapter is focused on the study of Muhammad and the Qur'an. The section on the prophet in the chapter is entitled 'Muhammad and the Muslim Community' and commences with an introduction to Arabia and the Arabs, and concludes with a few pages on Western assessments and criticisms of the Islamic Prophet. The section on the Qur'an covers all the major themes of the Muslim holy scriptures and examines Muslim beliefs regarding its nature.

=== The Muslim Community in History ===
The next chapter is mostly concerned with the history of the Muslim world, beginning with Muhammad in Medina and ending with the "Sultanate Period" of the medieval Muslim states. In course of this examination, Esposito deals with the Crusades and also with the development of law and mysticisms.

=== Religious life: Belief and Practice ===
Chapter three is an exposition of Islamic beliefs and practices, and concentrates more on the theological and legal manifestations of the morals discussed in the chapter of the Qur'an.

Esposito's explanation of Sufism in this section is the weakest part of the book, according to R. W. J. Martin. He argues that Esposito does not explore the deeper dimensions of the mystical movement, instead only covering how it manifests itself on the popular level.

=== Modern Islamic Reform Movements ===
The fourth chapter focuses on Islamic revivalist and reform movements, spanning the late 19th and the early 20th centuries. Esposito considers these movements as the "dominant themes" in the Middle East and the Indian subcontinent through which Muslims responded to their internal decline and European imperialism. His study takes into account the position of Muslim "modernists" like Jamal al-Din al-Afghani, Muhammad Abduh, Sayyid Ahmad Khan, and Muhammad Iqbal, all of whom emphasized the adaptability of Islam to the demands and challenges of modernity. Esposito also looks at the "neo-revivalists", such as Sayyid Qutb, and Maududi, who, born of disillusionment with the West, envisioned a social order based on a self-sufficient Islamic alternative.

=== Contemporary Islam: Religion and Politics ===
The fifth chapter concentrates on Islamic movements after 1950, a period distinguished by a significant emphasis on religious identity. Esposito provides descriptions of revival and reform movements in five countries: Egypt, Libya, Iran, Lebanon, and Saudi Arabia.

=== Islam and Change:The Struggle for Islam in the Twenty-First Century ===
Chapter six (which was expanded from the last 28 pages of chapter five in the first edition) is devoted to issues of authority and interpretation of Islam in the modern context, and includes topics such as legal reform and women's rights. The main contents of this chapter are: The Bifurcation of Society, The Ulama and Reform, Tradition: Anchor or Albatross?, A Spectrum of Reformers and Approaches, Cyberspace and High-Tech Islam, Critical Areas of Islamic Reform, The Challenge of Religious Pluralism, Global Muslim Multifaith and Intercivilizational Initiatives and The Challenge of Pluralism for Western Secular Democracies

== Usage ==
Gisela Webb considers the book to one of the most widely used introductory texts on Islam.

The book can be utilized in a variety of situations and disciplines: introductory courses on Islam, survey courses in religions, courses on Middle Eastern history, politics, and anthropology. The book is also made to be accessible for a non-specialist audience. To this end, Esposito has excluded diacritic marks in the transliteration of Arabic terms.

The book was used in many church study groups during the Gulf War.

== Reviews ==
Richard C. Martin, from the Department of Religious Studies at Arizona State University, describes the book as "good background text" and concludes that:

"If our students have to have the whole of Islamic civilization in two hundred pages, then Islam: The Straight Path is commendable for its readability, its extended coverage of the modern period, and its irenic tone."

R. W. J. Austin argues the book gives a reasonably full and intelligent introduction to the Islamic community. He, however, does argue that because the book stretches itself wide, there are inevitable omissions and imbalances in coverage.
