= Yvonne Haddad =

Syrian-born American Islamic scholar

Yvonne Yazbeck Haddad (Arabic: إيفون يزبك حداد; born in Syria) is Professor Emerita of the History of Islam and Christian–Muslim Relations at the Prince Alwaleed Center for Muslim–Christian Understanding at Georgetown University. Her interests and focus include contemporary Islam; intellectual, social and political history in the Arab world; Islam in the West; Quranic Exegesis; and gender and Islam. Haddad's current research focuses on Muslims in the West and on Islamic Revolutionary Movements. She has published extensively in the field of Islamic studies.

Haddad has been described as "at the top of her field in the study of Muslims in America" and "the foremost interpreter of the Islamic experience in the United States." She is the leading figure in a school of thought that sees the key issue for Muslims in the US as being the conflict between traditional Islamic values and integration into mainstream US society.

Haddad received her Ph.D. in the Economic, Political Development, and Islamic Heritage in 1979 from Hartford Seminary in Hartford, Connecticut, and her master's degree in Comparative History 1971 from the University of Wisconsin in Madison. Additionally, she attended Boston University, where she received an M.R.E. in Religious Education and Leadership Development in 1966, and the Beirut College for Women in Lebanon. She was also Professor of History at the University of Massachusetts Amherst.

Yvonne Haddad describes herself as a Presbyterian. She emigrated to the United States in 1963.

== Published works ==
- Yvonne Haddad. A Vanishing Minority: Christians in the Middle East (An Annotated Bibliography).: forthcoming.
- Yvonne Haddad. "Not Quite American? The Shaping of Arab and Muslim Identity in the United States," An Edmonson Historical Lecture. Baylor University Press, 2004.
- Yvonne Haddad, John Esposito. The Islamic Revival since 1989: A Critical Survey and Bibliography 1989–1994. Westport, CT: Greenwood Press, 1997.
- Yvonne Haddad, Jane Smith. Mission to America: Five Islamic Sectarian Movements in North America. Gainesville, FL: University of Florida Press, 1993.
- Yvonne Haddad, John Voll, John Esposito, Kathleen Moore, and David Sawan. The Contemporary Islamic Revival: A Critical Survey and Bibliography. Westport, CT: Greenwood Press, 1991.
- Yvonne Haddad, Adair Lummis. Islamic Values in the United States: A Comparative Study. New York: Oxford University Press, 1987.
- Yvonne Haddad. Contemporary Islam and the Challenge of History. Albany, NY: State University of New York Press, 1982.
- Yvonne Haddad, Jane Smith. The Islamic Understanding of Death and Resurrection. Albany, NY: State University of New York Press, 1981.

== See also ==
- John Esposito
