= Tabligh =

Islamic process of dawah

Tabligh (Arabic: التبليغ, romanized: Tablīgh), or conveying or propagation, is a major process of an Islamic mission (dawah) on which Islam has built its existence and identity in human life. Per the Oxford Dictionary of Islam, the modern use of the term is interchangeable with dawah.

According to scholars, in Islam, tabligh is Quranic preaching as conveying the truth to people’s minds and bringing them out of the darkness of ignorance. Islam claims monotheism as a bright truth called tawhid. Tabligh means conveying that truth to people’s minds and intellects. It can also be said that tabligh is teaching people the rulings of Islam and divine knowledge, giving people good tidings of paradise and the blessings of Allah, encouraging them to work to obtain the pleasure of Allah, warning them against disobeying the commands of Allah and calling them to believe in the fundamentals of Islam and to act on the branches.

== Etymology ==
The linguistic meaning of at-tabligh is propagation, conveyance, deliver or distribution, and its noun is adulthood or youth. (Note: e.g.: The boy has reached the age of adulthood or maturity.) Bulug, ablagh and tabligh mean to reach, transport, convey and deliver to a desired goal or desired limit, whether this limit or goal is a place, time or a morally determined matter. This meaning implies a sense of exaggeration in the expression, which takes the word beyond the limits of a realistic meaning.

== Definition ==
It can be deduced from the linguistic meaning and Quranic usage that Tabligh in Islam is presenting and conveying the divine Islamic teachings and guidance to people. Allah said: “O Messenger, proclaim that which has been revealed to you from your Lord. And if you do not, then you have not conveyed His message. And God will protect you from the people.” Many Quranic verses and narrations are found that speak about the status of Tabligh and calling and their importance in the lives of nations and peoples throughout history, due to their connection to the various aspects of human society, its levels, and its otherworldly and worldly requirements, and the fact that they represent the direct intermediary between heaven and earth, and the means that Allah chose to guide, teach, and purify His creation. The detailed hadith that was mentioned about the call, communication, guidance, direction, enjoining good and the like in many places in the Book and Sunnah is nothing but the best evidence of the divine keenness to convey the heavenly laws, especially the Islamic law, and to teach its rulings to the people, which is what we call “the process of communication and calling to Allah.” Therefore, informing people about Islamic rulings and divine knowledge, giving believers good tidings of Paradise and divine bliss, warning those who disobey of punishment, and warning them against the consequences of deviating after worldly desires and pleasures and forgetting the Hereafter is the purpose of Islamic preaching. Preaching is the goal of the existence of every prophet. If it were not for the mission of preaching, sending prophets would have been in vain and meaningless. Sending prophets is a manifestation of the attribute of mercy and compassion. They are like the sun in guidance and benefit to humanity. These two attributes were most evident in Muhammad in the words of Allah in Surat Al-Anbiya: “And We have not sent you, [O Muhammad], except as a mercy to the worlds.” If he had not come and renewed the call of the previous prophets, Allah’s mercy would not have been revealed to us, and we would have remained lost and confused in the desert of ignorance, disbelief, and the desolate misguidance.

== Quran ==
The word is mentioned in many places of the Quran, including Verse 67 of Sura al-Ma'idah.

O Messenger! Deliver what has been revealed to you from your Lord, for if you fail to do that, you have not fulfilled the task of His messengership. Allah will certainly protect you from the evil of men. Surely Allah will not guide the unbelievers (to succeed against you).

— Quran 5:67

The word balagh and its derivatives in the Quran originally have that meaning. For example, the Quran says:

And do not shave your heads until the sacrificial animal reaches its destination

— Quran 2:196

That is, until the sacrificial animal reaches its designated place, and the goal or objective here is spatial. For example, the Almighty said: “Until, when he reaches his full strength and reaches forty years, he says, ‘My Lord, inspire me to be grateful for Your favor.’” Until he reaches the time when he is mentally and physically complete, which is the time when he has completed forty years of his life. The goal, as is clear, is temporal. And similar to the saying of Allah: He said, "If I ask you about anything after this, do not accompany me. You have already reached an excuse from me." meaning that I have reached the point where my excuse is not accepted. This is a spiritual matter. Hence, the meaning of tabligh or conveying that is intended to be explained is to deliver one thing to another. The meaning of tabligh or conveying is often used in spiritual matters and is less often used in tangible matters, such as when we say: I conveyed or delivered a message to Zaid, or someone a warning. Allah said: "I convey to you the messages of my Lord and advise you.' meaning that I am charged with conveying to you the messages of Allah, which are His teachings and guidance.

The Quran has used different terms such as the following, but all have the same meaning:

1. Dawah (Arabic: الدعوة), or call, such as Allah'ssaying in Surah Nuh: “He said, ‘My Lord, indeed I have called my people night and day.’” [Nuh: 5].
2. Irshad (Arabic: الإرشاد) or guidance, such as Allah's in Surah Al-Jinn: “He guides to the right path, so we have believed in him, and we will never associate with our Lord anyone.” [Al-Jinn: 2].
3. Tabligh (Arabic: التبليغ), or conveying the message, such as Allah's saying in Surah Al-Ahzab: “Those who convey the messages of Allah and fear Him and do not fear anyone except Allah. And sufficient is Allah as Accountant.” [Al-Ahzab: 39].
4. Tabshir (Arabic: التبشير), or giving good tidings, such as Allah's saying in Surah Al-Furqan: “And We have not sent you, [O Muhammad], except as a bringer of good tidings and a warner.” [Al-Furqan: 56].

== Foundations of all prophets' tabligh ==
Three foundations were the base of all prophets' tabligh:

1. The comprehensive view, as they address the human being from all aspects, as they address the human being's mind, logic, heart and feelings so that these human windows are all in the lights of divine revelation, as the mind, logic and emotions go hand in hand in the call of Muhammad, and one aspect of it is not exploited at the expense of the other, and the Holy Qur’an defines the features of the path of the prophets in the Allah's saying in:Surat Yusuf Say, "This is my way; I invite to Allah with insight, I and those who follow me. And exalted is Allah; and I am not of those who associate others with Allah." 108 [Yusuf: 108].
2. One of the foundations of preaching among the prophets is: not waiting for reward from people, but from Allah, who sent them as preachers and guides. Preaching is the job and mission of the prophets, and their motto is: “My reward is only from Allah.”
3. Preaching among the prophets leaves the results to God. The job of the prophet is to preach, and as for guiding people and their response, it is for Allah. Fethullah Gülen refers to the state of some prophets who no one believed with them, even though they exerted all their efforts in preaching. However, their enthusiasm did not wane or their resolve weaken until the last moment.

== View on tabligh ==
One of the roles of the school is to teach the student knowledge, but it must whet his appetite to ask for more of it, as tabligh is a requirement imposed by the increasing need to convey that knowledge to the minds of students because teachers should never forget that knowledge develops with the development of communication needs within the group that seeks knowledge. It is natural that the development of those needs to be directly linked to the development of the group at the level of thought and society. This is evident in the development of technology, and the growing division of work also brings new means that parallel the emerging jobs and new technologies. Tabligh is an important issue and today is at the top of everything, because the world now relies on the support of communication and the media.

== Ruling on tabligh ==
Scholars find that the fard or obligation, as is apparent in all the verses that speak about tabligh, is specific to the messengers and does not extend to others, which is contrary to what came in the obligation of calling to Islamé That does not mean that conveying is limited to the messengers because there are two stages of tabligh or Islamic conveying. The first stage is the stage of conveying it from Allah to the people, which can be expressed as the stage of receiving, and it is limited to the messengers who receive Allah's teachings from Him and then convey them to the people around them. Then comes the second stage of conveying, which is the stage of spreading, and it is one of the duties of the followers of the messengers who believe in their teachings and in the Islamic nation for the scholars who are charged with it since they are his heirs in his teachings and religion.

One of the most important duties is to spread Islamic teachings and disseminate them among the people, and this is the meaning of conveying, and its ruling is the obligation on the scholars who can do so. Hence, the ruling on tabligh or conveying, like the ruling on calling to Islam, is a communal duty. However, the ruling on conveying the message is obligatory for every scholar but not for every individual in the nation.

== Tabligh in Salat ==
It is one of the followers raising his voice if the imam in congregational prayer has a weak voice so that they can follow the movements of the prayer (salat). The imam must raise his voice so that the congregation he is praying with can hear. If the congregation increases, and he cannot hear them, tabligh is recommended. Tabligh in prayer when there is no need is disliked, but when there is a need, it is recommended. The one who follows the imam should limit himself to the voice that ensures that those behind him can hear him but not increase it.

In the fatwas of Sheikh Imam Muhammad Abduh, scholars stated that tabligh when there is no need is disliked. In fact, some of them reported the agreement of the four imams that tabligh in this case is a reprehensible innovation, and it is disliked. However, when there is a need for it, it is recommended, and they stated that it is disliked for the one reporting to increase the announcement according to the need.

Sheikh Abdul-Aziz Ibn Baz was asked a similar question and he answered by saying: "If the congregation can hear the voice of the imam and it is not hidden from them, then there is no need to announce it. However, if it may be hidden from some of them, such as in the back rows, then it is recommended to announce it. Prophet Muhammad prayed one day when he was sick and his voice was weak, so Abu Bakr used to announce it on his behalf, so there is nothing wrong with that. If there is a need to announce it due to the size of the mosque and the large number of people in the congregation, or because the imam’s voice is weak due to illness or something else, then some of the congregation should announce it. However, if the voice is clear to everyone and is not hidden from anyone in the outskirts, and it is known that everyone can hear it, then there is no need to announce it and it is not prescribed."

== See also ==
- Verse of tabligh

== Sources ==
- Esposito, John L., ed. (2003). "Tabligh". The Oxford Dictionary of Islam. Oxford University Press. ISBN 9780195125580.
- Esposito, John L., ed. (2009a). "Tabligh". The Oxford Encyclopedia of Islamic World. Oxford University Press. ISBN 9780195305135.
- Esposito, John L., ed. (2009b). "Daʿwah". The Oxford Encyclopedia of Islamic World. Oxford University Press. ISBN 9780195305135.
