= Reforms of Umar's era =

Umar was the second Rashidun caliph and reigned during 634 to 644 CE. This article details the reforms of Umar's era. Umar undertook many administrative reforms and closely oversaw public policy, establishing an advanced administration for newly conquered lands, including several new ministries and bureaucracies, as well as ordering a census of all the Muslim territories. During his reign, the garrison cities of Basrah and al-Kūfah were founded or expanded. In 638, he extended and renovated the Grand Mosque in Mecca and the Mosque of the Prophet in Medina. He also began the process of codifying Islamic law.

== Reforms ==
=== Political ===
Umar was first to establish a special department for the investigation of complaints against the officers of the State. This department acted as Administrative court, where the legal proceedings were personally led by Umar. The Department was under the charge of Muhammad ibn Maslamah, one of Umar's most trusted men. In important cases Muhammad ibn Maslamah was deputed by Umar to proceed to the spot, investigate the charge and take action. Sometimes an Inquiry Commission was constituted to investigate the charge. On occasions the officers against whom complaints were received were summoned to Medina, and charged in Umar's administrative court. Umar was known for this intelligence service through which he made his officials accountable This service was also said to have inspired fear in his subjects. On discovery of any scandal on the part of any official, an investigation through a special department of accountability headed by Muhammad ibn Maslamah would be carried out and if the official would prove guilty he was immediately deposed from his office and his punishment was vary from publicly humiliating punishments to flogging. Before appointment, all financial assets and details of the political officer used to be recorded and were checked each year.

=== Military ===
Caliph Umar organized the army as a state department. This reform was introduced in 637 CE, with the Quraysh and the Ansars and the system was gradually extended to the whole of Arabia and to Muslims of conquered lands. A register of all adults who could be called to war was prepared, and a scale of salaries was fixed. All men registered were liable to military service. They were divided into two categories, namely:

1. Those who formed the regular standing army; and
2. Those that lived in their homes, but were liable to be called to the colors whenever needed.

The pay was paid in the beginning of the month of Muharram. The allowances were paid during the harvesting season. The armies of the Caliphs were mostly paid in cash salaries. In contrast to many post-Roman polities in Europe, grants of land, or of rights to collect taxes directly from the payers, were of only minor importance. A major consequence of this was that the army directly depended on the state for its subsistence which, in turn, meant that the military had to control the state apparatus.

Promotions in the army were made on the strength of the length of service or exceptional merit. Officership was an appointment and not a rank. Officers were appointed to command for the battle or the campaign; and once the operation was concluded, they could well find themselves in the ranks again. Leave of absence was given to army men at regular intervals. The troops stationed at far off places were given leave after four months. Each army corps was accompanied by an officer of the treasury, an Accountant, a Qadi, and a number of interpreters besides a number of Physicians and Surgeons. Expeditions were undertaken according to seasons. Expeditions in cold countries were undertaken during the summer, and in hot countries in winter. Umar established military cantonments on strategic positions throughout the empire to deal with any emergency efficiently and quickly. The garrison towns of Kufa, Basra and Fustat were founded by Umar. They were also provincial capitals of their respective provinces.

=== Social ===
The concepts of welfare and pension were introduced early Islamic law as forms of Zakat (charity tax), one of the Five Pillars of Islam, under Umar in the 7th century. The taxes (including Zakat and Jizya) collected in the treasury of an Islamic government were used to provide income for the needy, including the poor, elderly, orphans, widows, and the disabled. According to the Islamic jurist Al-Ghazali (Algazel, 1058–1111), the government was also expected to stockpile food supplies in every region in case a disaster or famine occurred. The Caliphate can thus be considered the world's first major welfare state.

=== Religious ===
Muhammad initially prayed tarawih, special Muslim prayers during the month of Ramadan, but later discontinued this practice out of fear that Muslims would start to believe the prayers to be mandatory, rather than a sunnah. During his caliphate, Umar reinstated the practice of praying tarawih in congregation as there was no longer any fear of people taking it as something mandatory.

== See also ==
- Nikah mut‘ah
- Salat al-Janazah
- Divorce in Islam
- Early social changes under Islam
