= John Esposito =

American professor (1940–2026)

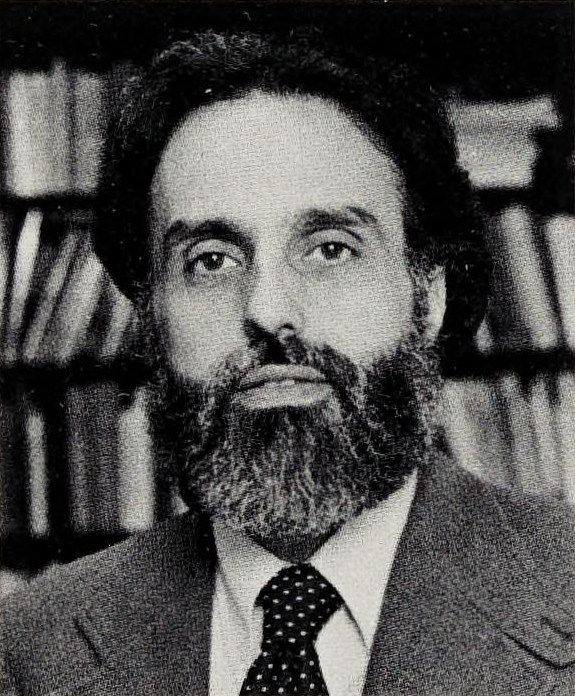
- Esposito, c. 1983
- Born: John Louis Esposito; May 19, 1940; New York City, U.S.
- Died: July 15, 2026 (aged 86); Philadelphia, Pennsylvania, U.S.
- Occupations: Academic, editor, writer
- Spouse: Jean Esposito (m. 1965)

Academic background
- Education: St Antony's College, Oxford (BA); St John's University (MA); Temple University (PhD)
- Influences: Ismail al-Faruqi

Academic work
- Discipline: Middle Eastern, religious, Islamic studies
- Institutions: Georgetown University
- Notable works: The Oxford Dictionary of Islam, Islam: The Straight Path

Signature
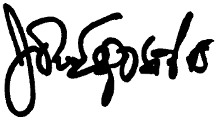

John Louis Esposito (May 19, 1940 – July 15, 2026) was an American academic who was a professor of Middle Eastern and religious studies, as well as a scholar of Islamic studies. He served as professor of religion, international affairs, and Islamic studies at Georgetown University in Washington, D.C. Esposito was also the founding director of the Prince Alwaleed Center for Muslim–Christian Understanding at Georgetown.

== Early life and education ==
Esposito was born in Brooklyn, New York, in 1940. He was a Catholic and came from an Italian-American family.

Esposito gained a BA in philosophy at St Antony's College, Oxford, in 1963. He gained an MA in theology at St John's University in 1966. He gained his doctorate at Temple University in 1974 with Islamic Studies as his major and comparative religions as his minor. He completed his doctoral studies under the supervision of the influential Islamic scholar Isma'il Raji al-Faruqi.

== Academic career ==
For nearly 20 years after completing his Ph.D., Esposito taught religious studies (including Hinduism, Buddhism, and Islam) at the College of the Holy Cross, a 4-years Jesuit college in Massachusetts. At the College of the Holy Cross, he held the Loyola Professor of Middle East Studies position, was the chair of the Department of Religious Studies, and director of the College of the Holy Cross's Center for International Studies. At Georgetown University, Esposito held the position of university professor and taught as both professor of religion and international affairs and professor of Islamic studies.

Esposito published Islam and Politics in 1984, and Islam: The Straight Path in 1988. Both books sold well, going through many editions. In addition to more than 35 books, he was editor-in-chief of a number of Oxford reference works, including The Oxford Encyclopedia of the Modern Islamic World, The Oxford History of Islam, The Oxford Dictionary of Islam, The Oxford Encyclopedia of the Islamic World (six volumes), and Oxford Islamic Studies Online.

In 1988, he was elected president of the Middle East Studies Association of North America (MESA). He also served as president of the American Academy of Religion and president of the American Council for the Study of Islamic Societies. He served as vice chair of the board of directors of the Center for the Study of Islam & Democracy from 1999 to 2004 he was a member of the World Economic Forum's Council of 100 Leaders, the High Level Group of the U.N. Alliance of Civilizations and the E. C. European Network of Experts on De-Radicalisation. He was an advisor to the award-winning documentary Muhammad: Legacy of a Prophet (2002), produced by Unity Productions Foundation and broadcast by PBS. A recipient of the American Academy of Religion's 2005 Martin E. Marty Award for the Public Understanding of Religion and of Pakistan's Quaid-e-Azam Award for Outstanding Contributions in Islamic Studies, in 2003 he received Georgetown University's School of Foreign Service Outstanding Teacher Award.

He founded the Center for Muslim–Christian Understanding at Georgetown University in 1993 and was its founding director. The center received a $20 million endowment from Saudi Arabian Prince Alwaleed Bin Talal "to advance education in the fields of Islamic civilization and Muslim-Christian understanding and strengthen its presence as a world leader in facilitating cross-cultural and inter-religious dialogue".

== Approach to the study of Islam ==
Although Esposito had been teaching world religions since the early 1970s, his career took off after the Iranian revolution of 1979, which greatly increased the demand for clear and up-to-date understanding of Muslims in the modern world. Rather than approaching Islamic revivalism and political Islam (in Iran and elsewhere) as a security threat or a form of religious pathology, Esposito argued that these movements should be understood as responses to colonialism, authoritarian governance, and rapid social change. In works such as The Islamic Threat: Myth or Reality? and Unholy War: Terror in the Name of Islam, he argued against framing Islam as a monolithic civilizational adversary to the West, contending that such narratives gained prominence in Western policy and media discourse following the end of the Cold War and, later, the September 11 attacks. He was also credited with helping establish Islam as a permanent subject area within the American Academy of Religion during the 1980s.

Esposito's commitment to on-the-ground, interpersonal understanding of Muslim communities, begun during his time in Lebanon in the early 1970s, later informed his survey-based research into Muslim public opinion aimed at both academic and general audiences. This approach culminated in Who Speaks for Islam? What a Billion Muslims Really Think (2007), co-authored with Dalia Mogahed and based on a multi-year Gallup World Poll survey of tens of thousands of respondents across more than 35 Muslim-majority countries, which Esposito and Mogahed presented as empirical evidence intended to counter media and policy narratives about Muslim attitudes toward the West, democracy, and extremism.

== Death ==
Esposito died on July 15, 2026, at the age of 86, due to complications from a heart surgery, in Philadelphia. He is survived by his wife, Jean Esposito (Jeannette Paisker), whom he married in 1965.

After his death, the Council on American–Islamic Relations and Malaysian Prime Minister Anwar Ibrahim sent condolences; Ibrahim described Esposito as "an influential scholar who built the intellectual foundations for a deeper understanding of Islam in the West", and said that he and Esposito had been friends for more than 50 years. Former Turkish President Abdullah Gül stated that Esposito's introduction of Islam to the West was "beautiful and graceful".

== Bibliography ==
Selected works as author, co-author, or editor, include titles listed below.

=== Editor ===
- The Oxford Dictionary of Islam, as editor (1994), ISBN 0-19-512559-2
- The Oxford Encyclopedia of the Modern Islamic World, as editor (1995, 4-volume set), ISBN 0-19-506613-8
- The Islamic World: Past and Present, as editor (2004, 3-volume set), ISBN 0-19-516520-9
- The Oxford History of Islam, as editor (2004), ISBN 0-19-510799-3
- The Oxford Encyclopedia of the Islamic World, as editor (2009, 5-volume set), ISBN 978-0-19-530513-5

=== Books ===
- Islam and Development: Religion and Sociopolitical Change, as editor and contributor, Syracuse University Press (1980), ISBN 978-0815622307
- Women in Muslim Family Law (1st edition, sole-authored: 1982, ISBN 0-8156-2256-2; 2nd edition, with Natana J. Delong-Bas: 2001, ISBN 978-0-8156-2908-5), Syracuse University Press
- Islam in Transition: Muslim Perspectives, as editor and translator with John J. Donohue (1st edition: 1982, ISBN 978-0-19-503022-8; 2nd edition: 2006, ISBN 978-0-19-517431-1), Oxford University Press
- Islam and Public Life in Asia, as editor and contributor, Asia Society (1985)
- Islam in Asia: Religion, Politics, and Society, as editor (1987), Oxford University Press, ISBN 978-0-19-504081-4 (cloth), ISBN 978-0-19-504082-1 (paper)
- Islam: The Straight Path (1st edition: 1988; 5th edition, updated: 2016), Oxford University Press, ISBN 978-0-19-938147-0
- The Iranian Revolution: Its Global Impact, as editor, University Press of Florida (1990), ISBN 978-0-8130-1017-5
- The Contemporary Islamic Revival: A Critical Survey and Bibliography, co-authored with Yvonne Yazbeck Haddad, John O. Voll, Kathleen Moore, and David Sawan, Greenwood Press (1991), ISBN 0-313-24719-6
- Political Islam: Revolution, Radicalism, or Reform?, as editor and contributor, Lynne Rienner Publishers (1997), ISBN 978-1-55587-168-0 (paper), ISBN 978-1-55587-262-5 (cloth)
- The Islamic Revival since 1988: A Critical Survey and Bibliography, co-authored with Yvonne Yazbeck Haddad, Elizabeth Hiel, and Hibba Abugideiri, Greenwood Press (1997), ISBN 978-0-313-30480-4
- The Islamic Threat: Myth or Reality? (3rd edition: 1999), ISBN 0-19-513076-6
- Islam and Secularism in the Middle East, co-edited with Azzam Tamimi (2000), C. Hurst & Co. (London), ISBN 978-1-85065-541-1; New York University Press, ISBN 978-0-8147-8261-3
- Religion and Global Order, co-edited with Michael Watson, University of Wales Press (2000), ISBN 978-0-7083-1525-5
- Makers of Contemporary Islam, co-authored John Voll (2001), ISBN 0-19-514128-8
- Muslims and the West: Encounter and Dialogue, co-edited with Zafar Ishaq Ansari, Islamic Research Institute and the Center for Muslim-Christian Understanding, Georgetown University (2001), ISBN 978-969-408-217-2
- Daughters of Abraham: Feminist Thought in Judaism, Christianity, and Islam, co-edited with Yvonne Yazbeck Haddad (2001), ISBN 0-8130-2103-0
- Religion and Immigration: Christian, Jewish, and Muslim Experiences in the United States, co-edited with Yvonne Yazbeck Haddad and Jane I. Smith, AltaMira Press/Rowman & Littlefield (2003), ISBN 978-0-7591-0352-8
- Geography of Religion: Where God Lives, Where Pilgrims Walk, co-authored with S. Hitchcock (2004), ISBN 978-1435141957
- Islam and Secularism in the Middle East, co-edited with A. Tamimi ISBN 978-0814782613
- What Everyone Needs to Know About Islam (1st edition: 2002. 2nd edition: 2011), ISBN 978-0-19-979413-3
- Unholy War: Terror in the Name of Islam (2002), ISBN 0-19-515435-5
- World Religions Today, co-authored with Darrell J. Fasching and Todd T. Lewis (1st edition: 2002; multiple subsequent editions)
- Asian Islam in the 21st Century, as co-editor (2007) ISBN 978-0195333022
- Who Speaks for Islam? What a Billion Muslims Really Think, co-authored with Dalia Mogahed (2008), ISBN 978-1-59562-017-0
- The Future of Islam (2010), Oxford University Press, ISBN 978-0-19-516521-0
- Islam and Democracy after the Arab Spring, co-authored with John O. Voll and Tamara Sonn (2016), ISBN 978-0-19-514798-8
- Shariah: What Everyone Needs to Know, co-authored with Natana J. DeLong-Bas (2018), ISBN 978-0-19-932506-1

=== Collections ===
This section may include written or editorial contributions to collections of works by various scholars.

- Voices of Resurgent Islam, as editor (1983), ISBN 0-19-503340-X
- Islam and Democracy, as co-editor with John Voll (1996), ISBN 0-19-510816-7
- Islam and Politics, as editor (1st edition: 1984, 4th edition: 1998), ISBN 0-8156-2774-2
- Islam, Gender and Social Change, as co-editor with Yvonne Yazbeck Haddad (1997), ISBN 0-19-511357-8
- Muslims on the Americanization Path?, as co-editor with Yvonne Yazbeck Haddad (2000), ISBN 0-19-513526-1
- Iran at the Crossroads, as co-editor with R. K. Ramazani (2000), ISBN 0-312-23816-9
- Modernizing Islam: Religion in the Public Sphere in the Middle East and Europe, as co-editor with Francois Burgat (2003), ISBN 0-8135-3198-5
- Turkish Islam and the Secular State: The Gulen Movement, as co-editor with M. Hakan Yavuz (2003), ISBN 0-8156-3040-9
- Islam in Asia: Religion, Politics, & Society, as editor (2006), ISBN 0-19-504082-1
- Islamophobia: The Challenge of Pluralism in the 21st Century as co-editor with Ibrahim Kalin (2011), ISBN 978-0-19-975364-2
