= Gisela Webb =

American scholar of comparative religion

Gisela Goodrich Webb (July 1949-20 June 2026) was an American scholar of comparative religion and professor emerita of religious studies at Seton Hall University in South Orange, New Jersey. Her works mainly focus on the intellectual and mystical traditions of Islam, Muslim women's rights and Islam in America.

== Biography ==
Born in San Juan, Puerto Rico in a bicultural family, Gisela Webb completed her academic studies at the Temple University in Philadelphia, Pennsylvania obtaining her B. A. and M. A. in 1980 and 1986 respectively. She earned her PhD in religious studies from the same university in 1989 under the supervision of Islamic philosopher Seyyed Hossein Nasr. Webb was at Seton Hall University since 1989. She also taught at Gadja Mada University in Indonesia and was awarded Fulbright Award for Teaching and Research and Fulbright Senior Specialist Award in 2009. Webb has also served as a member of the Board of Directors of the American Council for the Study of Islamic Societies and was a member of the American Academy of Religion.

== Selected works ==
- The Human/angelic Relation in the Philosophies of Suhrawardi and Ibn Arabi (Temple University, 1989)
- Windows of Faith: Muslim Women Scholar-Activists of North America (Women and Gender in Religion) (Syracuse University Press, 2000)
