= The Oxford Dictionary of Islam =

Reference work on Islam

- Editor: John Esposito
- Published: 2004 (Oxford University Press)

The Oxford Dictionary of Islam is a dictionary of Islam, published by the Oxford University Press, with John Esposito as editor-in-chief.

== Overview ==
The dictionary contains over 2,000 entries on a wide range of Islamic related topics.
