= Sitakunda =

Town in Bangladesh

Sitakunda সীতাকুণ্ড
- Town and municipality
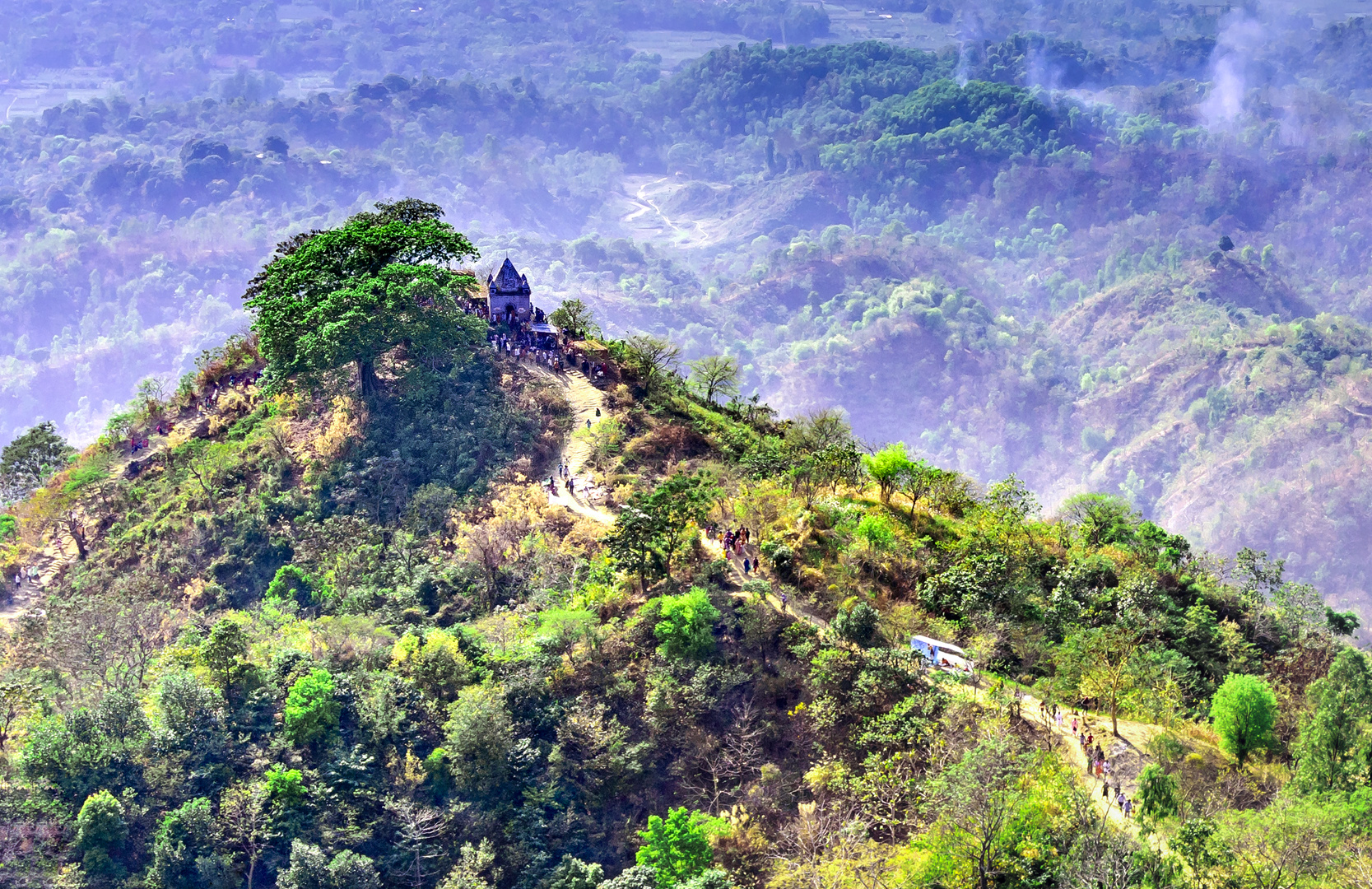
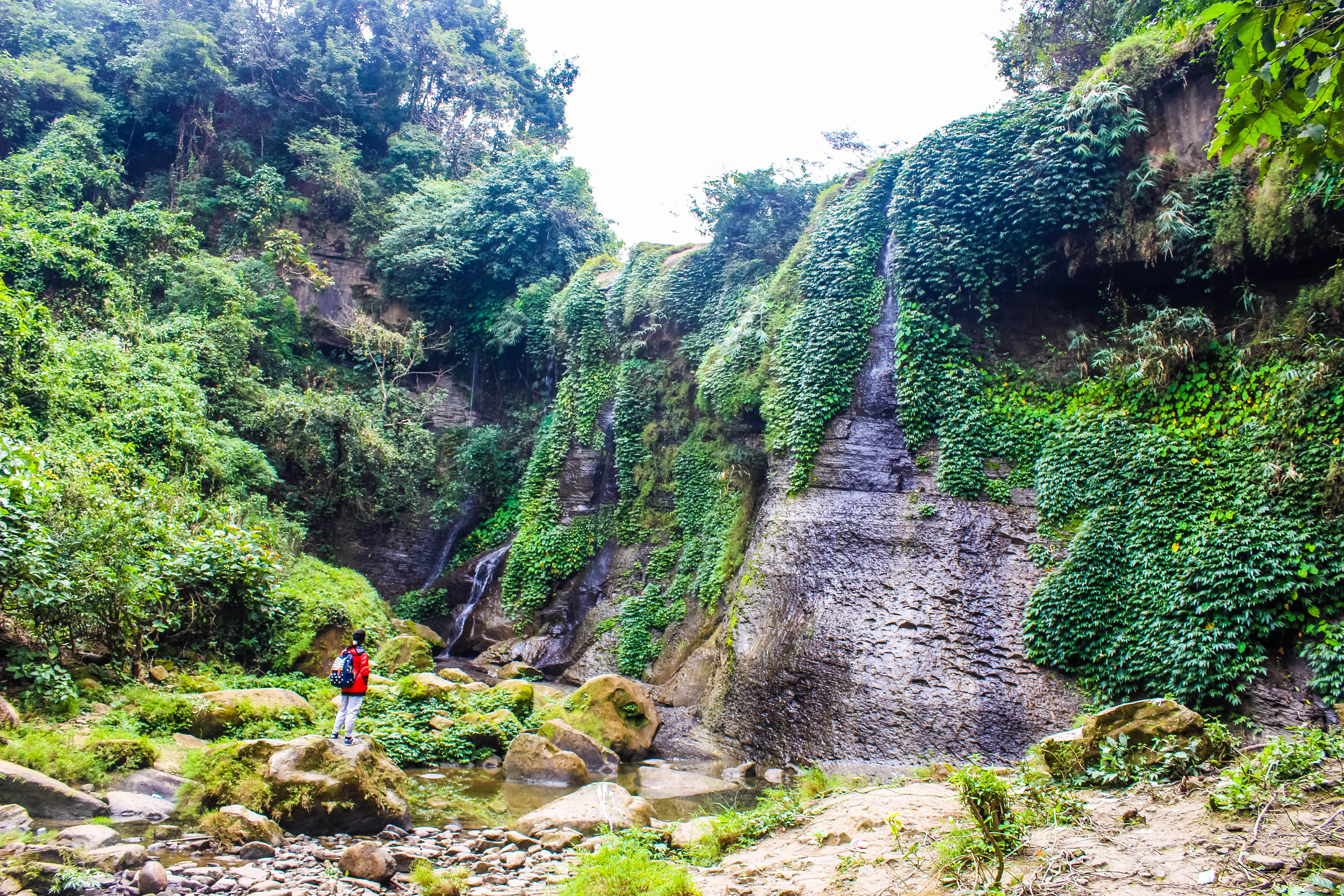
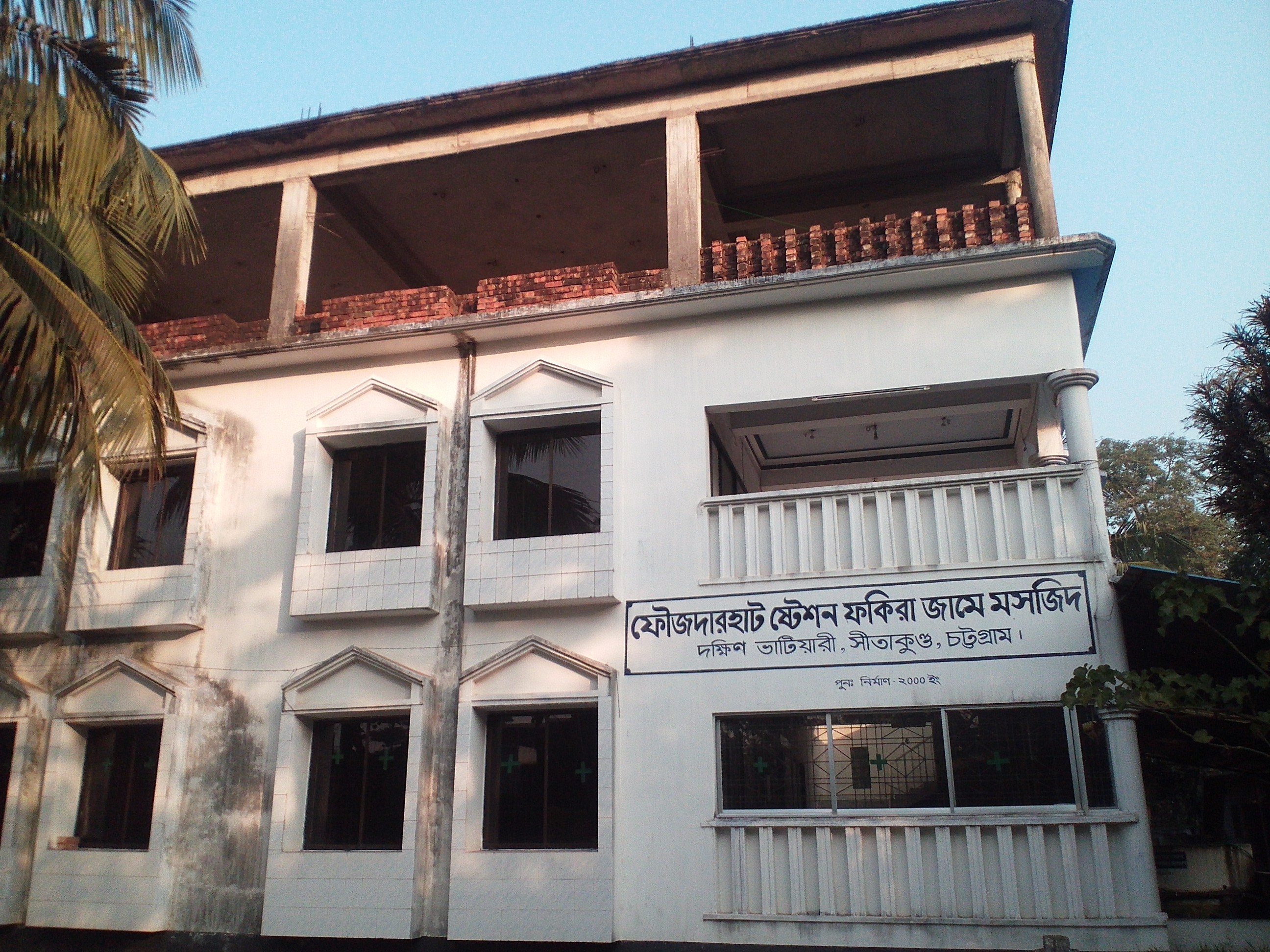
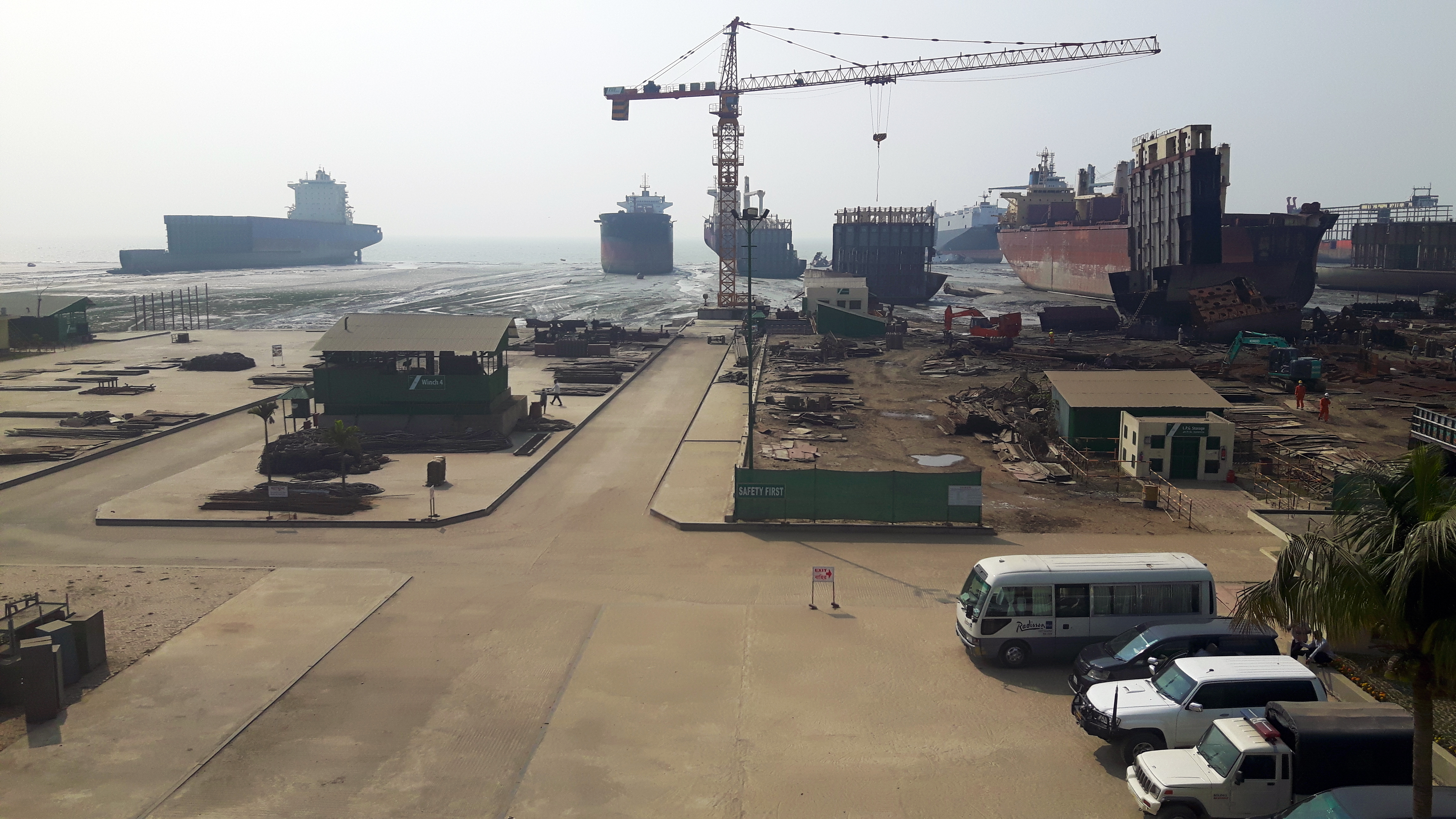
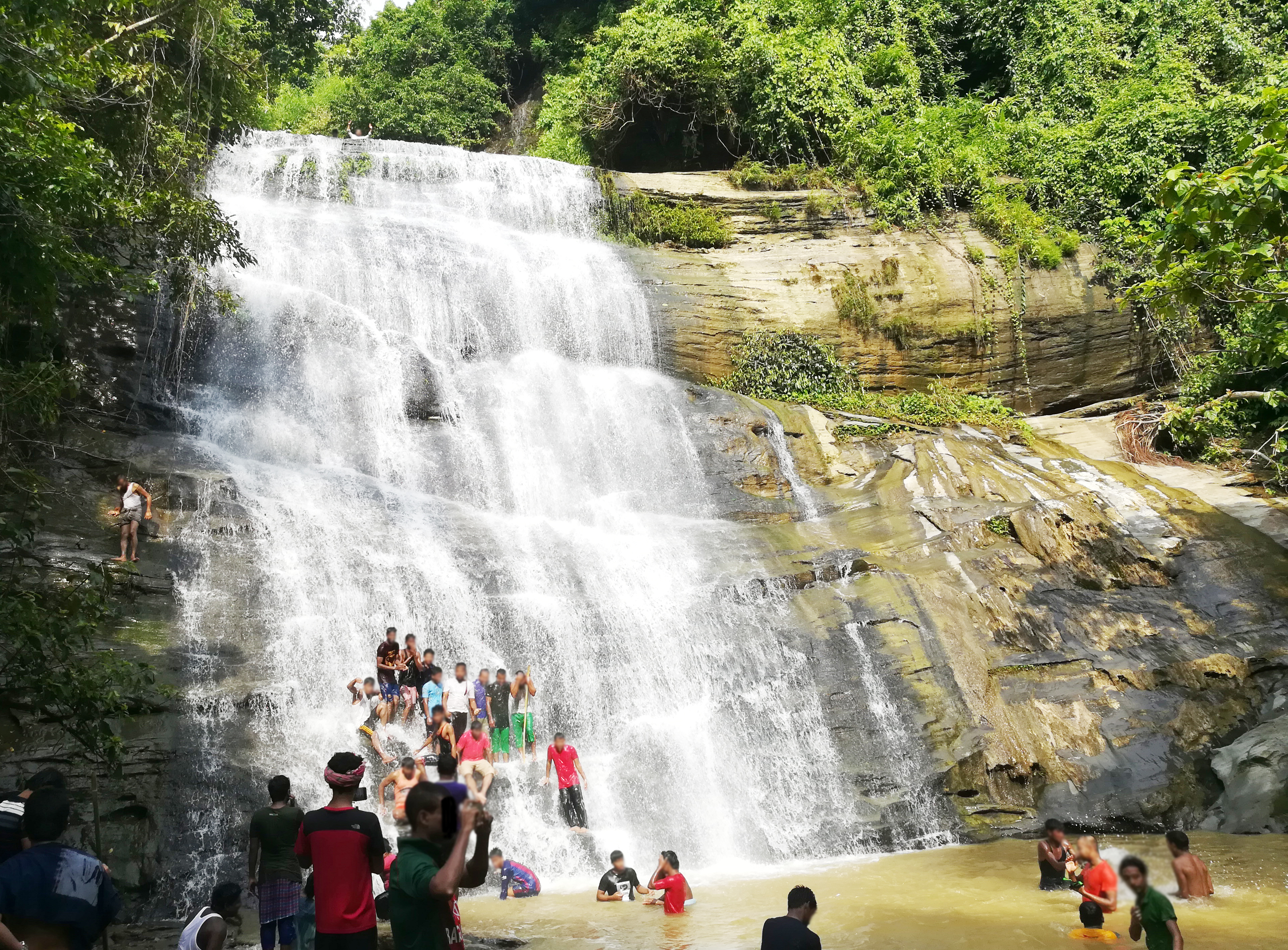
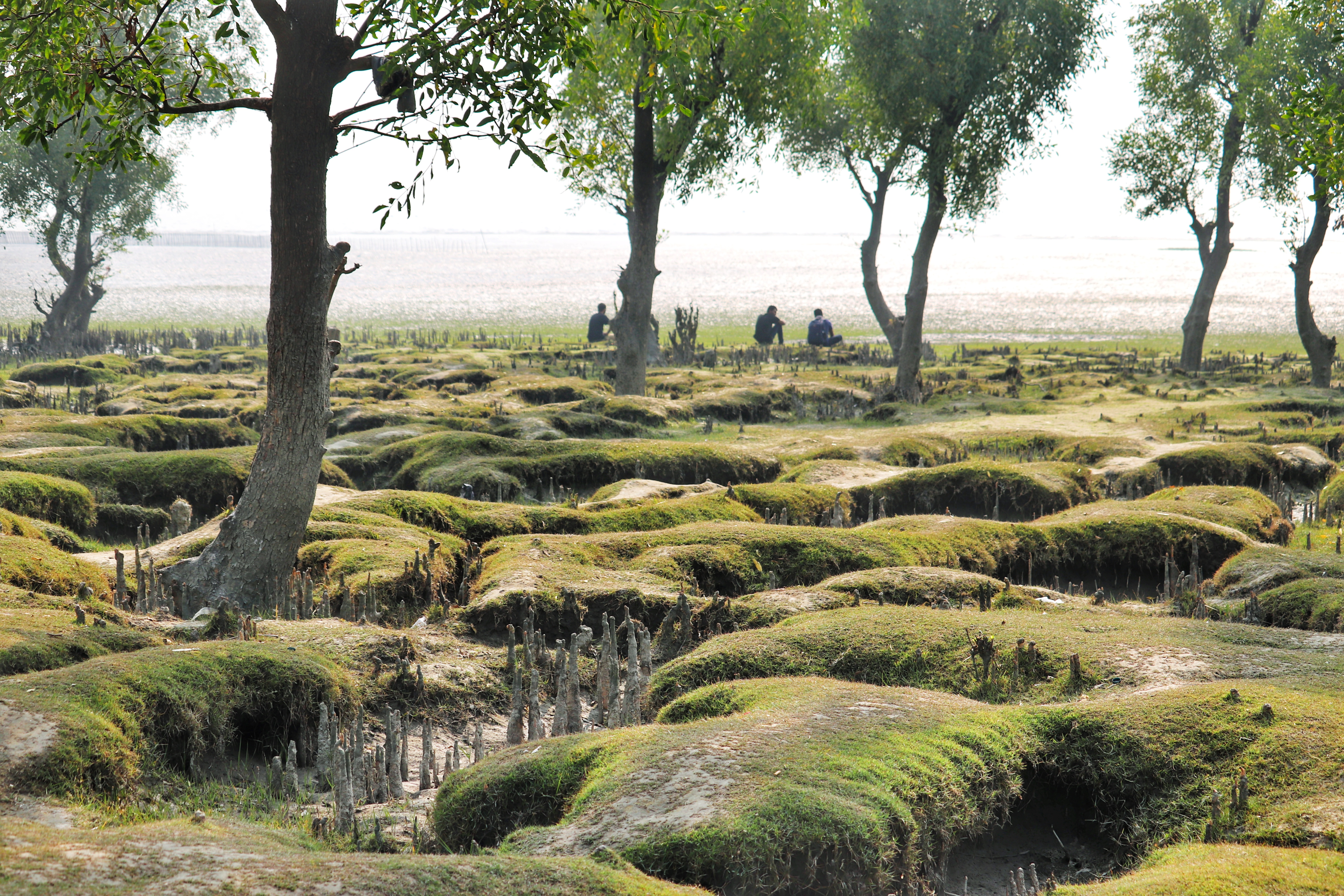
- clockwise: Chandranath Hill, Faqira Jame Mosque, Khoiyachora Waterfall, Guliakhali Beach, Ship Breaking Yard, Botanical Garden and Eco-Park

- Location in Bangladesh
- Coordinates: 22.62°N 91.66°E
- Country: Bangladesh
- Region: Chittagong Division
- District: Chittagong District

Area
  - Total: 28.63 km^{2} (11.05 sq mi)

Population
  - Total: 36,650
  - Density: 1,280/km^{2} (3,316/sq mi)
- Time zone: UTC+6 (BST)

Sitakunda Municipality mahallah geocode map

Sitakunda or Sitakunda Town (Bengali: সীতাকুণ্ড শহর) is an administrative centre and the sole municipality (Paurashava) of Sitakunda Upazila in Chattogram District, located in Chattogram Division, Bangladesh. Sitakunda is famous for the Chandranath Temple and a hot water spring 5 km north of the town.

== Administration ==
The Sitakunda town has 9 wards divided into 22 mahallas, and a population of 36,650 distributed to 6,914 units of households (average household size 5.3), including 18,662 men and 17,988 women (the male:female ratio is 104:100). The most notable mahallas of the town are Yakubnagar, Nunachara, Mohadebpur, Sobanbagh, Bhuiyan Para, Chowdhury Para (also known as Premtala), Moulvi Para, Amirabad, Edilpur and Shibpur.

Badiul Alam was the mayor of the town, he was first elected in 2015 and again in 2020 in the Sitakunda municipality election, he is a Awami League politician.

== History ==
To reduce the population pressure on Chittagong, Sitakunda has been developed as a satellite town of the city, as well as a zone selected for industrial development along with Bhatiari. The municipality is growing fast as an urban center, especially in and around Sitakunda and Mahadebpur mouzas where the Office of the Upazila Nirbahi Officer and other major Government offices, boys' high school and college are, but public services and facilities like electricity, drinking water, drainage and garbage disposal are under-provided.

== Geography ==
The town, situated on an unbroken flat land of alluvial deposits that lies below the level of high tide, is free from tidal effects and flash floods of the area due to an embankment.

=== Climate ===
Climate data for Sitakunda (1991–2020, extremes 1977-present)
Month	Jan	Feb	Mar	Apr	May	Jun	Jul	Aug	Sep	Oct	Nov	Dec	Year
Record high °C (°F)	32.2 (90.0)	35.7 (96.3)	39.1 (102.4)	40.2 (104.4)	39.0 (102.2)	36.8 (98.2)	36.4 (97.5)	37.2 (99.0)	38.6 (101.5)	36.7 (98.1)	36.0 (96.8)	33.0 (91.4)	40.2 (104.4)
Mean daily maximum °C (°F)	26.9 (80.4)	29.5 (85.1)	32.0 (89.6)	32.8 (91.0)	32.8 (91.0)	31.8 (89.2)	31.1 (88.0)	31.6 (88.9)	32.2 (90.0)	32.4 (90.3)	30.7 (87.3)	27.9 (82.2)	31.0 (87.8)
Daily mean °C (°F)	18.0 (64.4)	21.2 (70.2)	25.2 (77.4)	27.7 (81.9)	28.3 (82.9)	28.2 (82.8)	27.7 (81.9)	27.9 (82.2)	28.0 (82.4)	27.1 (80.8)	23.5 (74.3)	19.4 (66.9)	25.2 (77.4)
Mean daily minimum °C (°F)	11.7 (53.1)	14.6 (58.3)	19.7 (67.5)	23.4 (74.1)	24.8 (76.6)	25.6 (78.1)	25.5 (77.9)	25.4 (77.7)	25.2 (77.4)	23.6 (74.5)	18.6 (65.5)	13.6 (56.5)	21.0 (69.8)
Record low °C (°F)	5.5 (41.9)	6.5 (43.7)	10.5 (50.9)	16.7 (62.1)	19.3 (66.7)	21.0 (69.8)	23.0 (73.4)	21.0 (69.8)	21.4 (70.5)	17.8 (64.0)	11.7 (53.1)	5.7 (42.3)	5.5 (41.9)
Average precipitation mm (inches)	7 (0.3)	27 (1.1)	58 (2.3)	144 (5.7)	349 (13.7)	613 (24.1)	761 (30.0)	593 (23.3)	424 (16.7)	230 (9.1)	40 (1.6)	6 (0.2)	3,252 (128.0)
Average precipitation days (≥ 1 mm)	1	2	3	7	14	20	23	23	19	11	2	1	126
Average relative humidity (%)	75	72	74	78	81	85	87	86	85	83	80	78	80
Mean monthly sunshine hours	202.1	206.8	233.1	222.5	199.8	152.0	141.8	152.8	163.9	204.5	218.7	211.5	2,309.5
Source 1: NOAA
Source 2: Bangladesh Meteorological Department (humidity 1981-2010)
