= Sitakund Government Model High School =

- সীতাকুন্ড সরকারী আদর্শ উচ্চ বিদ্যালয়

Location
- Sitakunda, Chittagong; 4310; Bangladesh; 22.6187°N 91.6602°E

Information
- Type: Government
- Established: 1913
- Founder: Maulana Obaidul Hoque
- School board: Chittagong
- Session: January–December
- Grades: 6 to 10
- Education system: National Curriculum and Textbook Board
- Language: Bangla

Sitakund Government Model High School (Bengali: সীতাকুন্ড সরকারী আদর্শ উচ্চ বিদ্যালয়) is a secondary school in Sitakunda Upazila, Chittagong District, Bangladesh.
