= National Heritage Foundation of Bangladesh =

National Heritage Foundation of Bangladesh is a civil society group in Bangladesh. Led by Rizwan Bin Farouq, convener of the foundation, it was formed in 2007.

The aim of the group is to promote and preserve Bangladeshi culture and heritage. The foundation identified a number of sites across the country that require special attention for preservation and protection. It also wanted to add ten more Bangladeshi sites to the World Heritage Sites declared by UNESCO, of which Bangladesh has three – the Sundarbans, Somapura Mahavihara at Paharpur and the Sixty Pillar Mosque at Bagerhat. The sites identified by the foundation include Kantaji Temple, Mahasthangarh, Ahsan Manjil, Sitakunda and Madhabkunda waterfall, among others.
