= Guliakhali Beach =

Beach in Bangladesh

Guliakhali Sea beach
- Beach
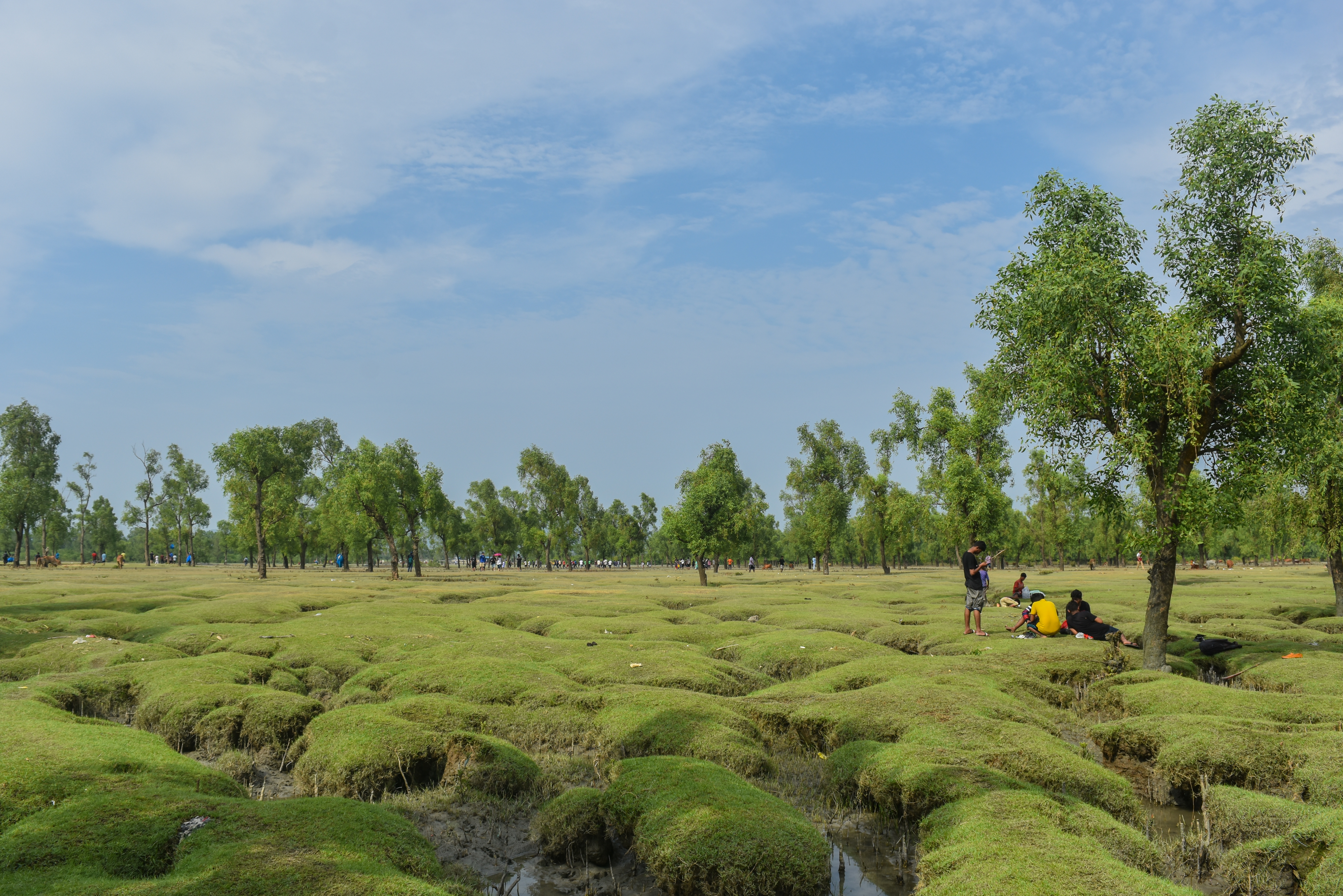
- Guliakhali Sea Beach

- Coordinates: 22°36′40.09″N 91°37′32.05″E
- Location: Muradpur, Sitakunda Upazila, Chittagong District
- Offshore water bodies: Bay of Bengal

Guliakhali sea beach (also known as Muradpur beach) is located at Muradpur, Sitakunda in Chittagong Division, Bangladesh. It is 5 kilometres away from Sitakunda town.

== Gallery ==
Guhliakhali sea beach

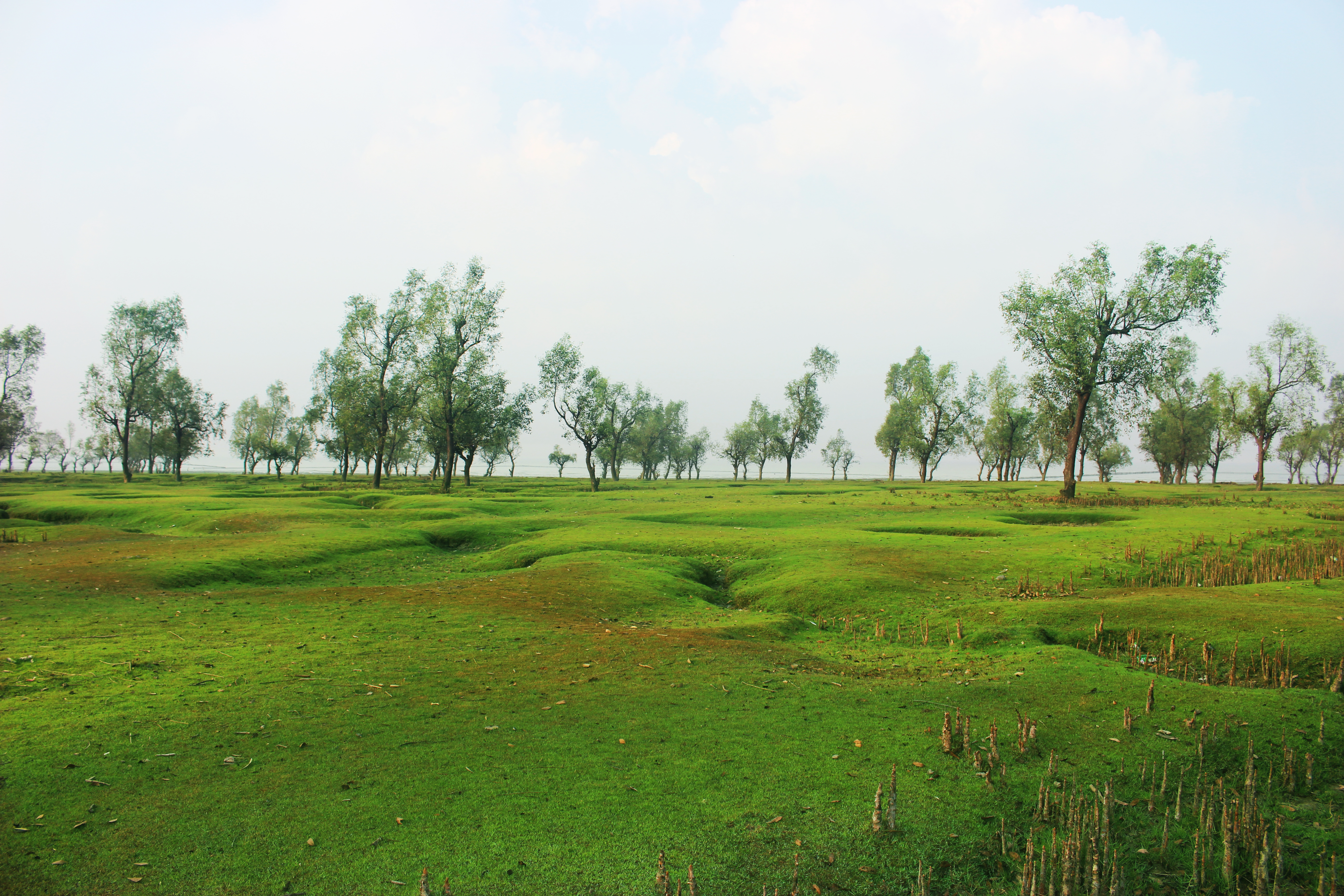

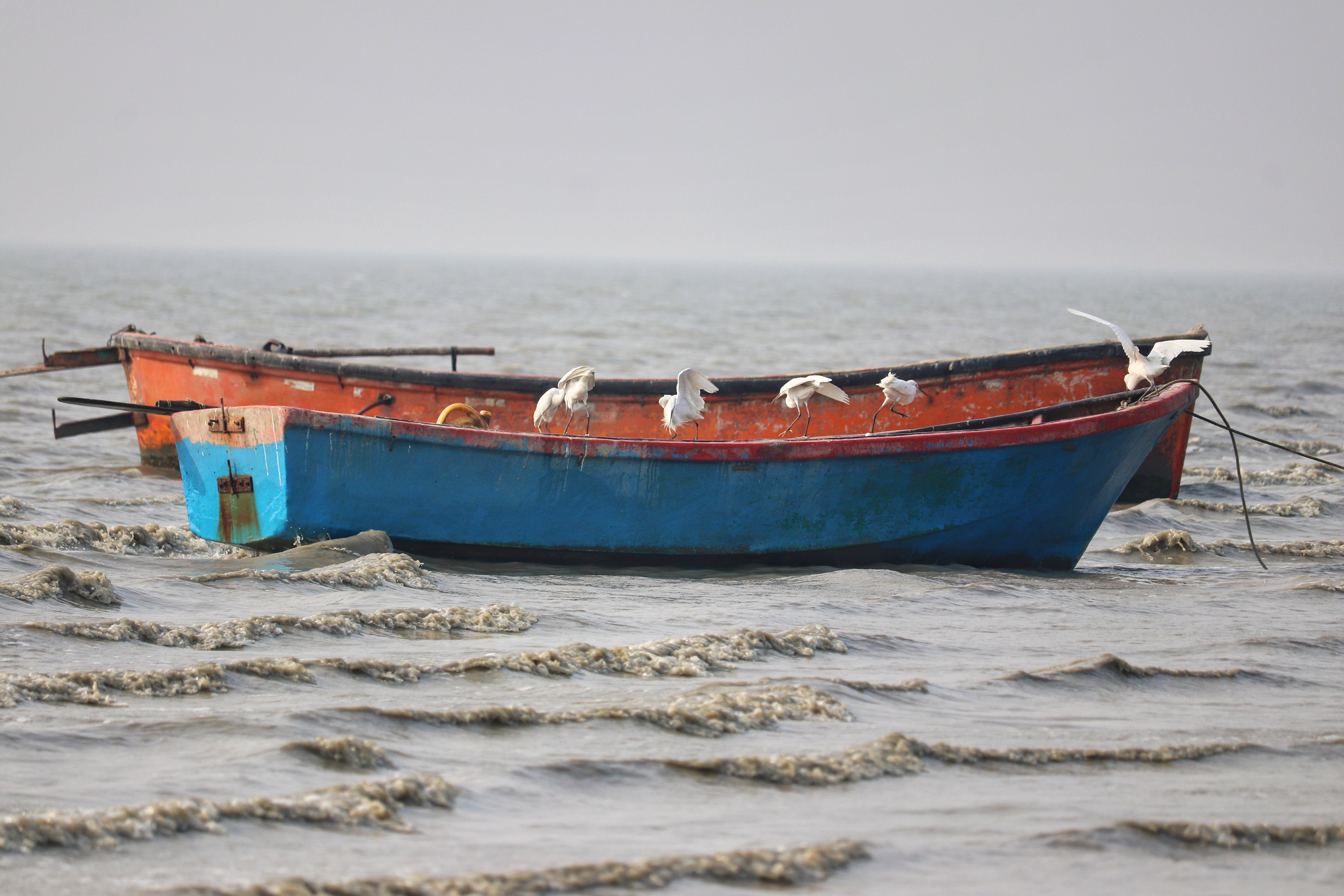

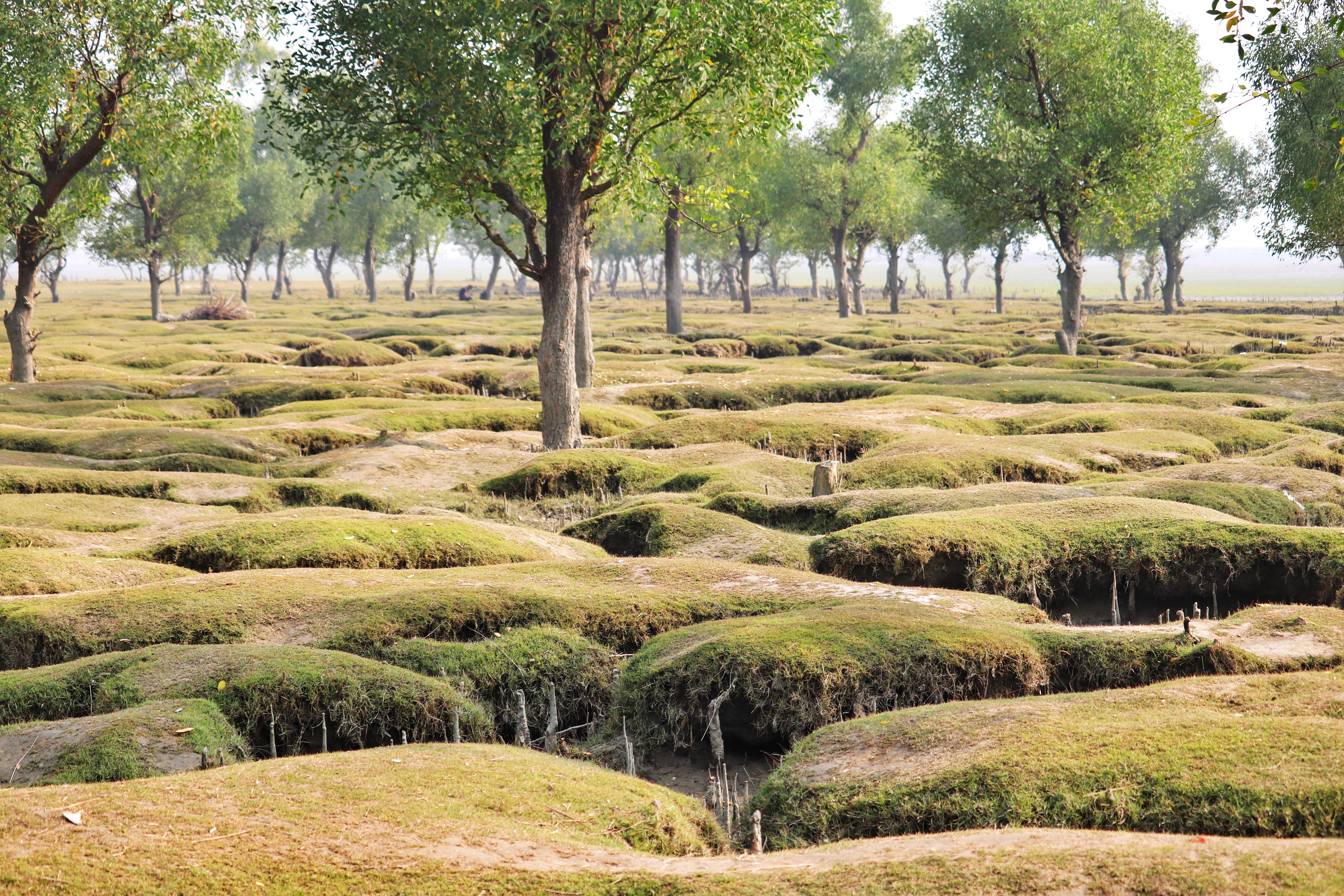

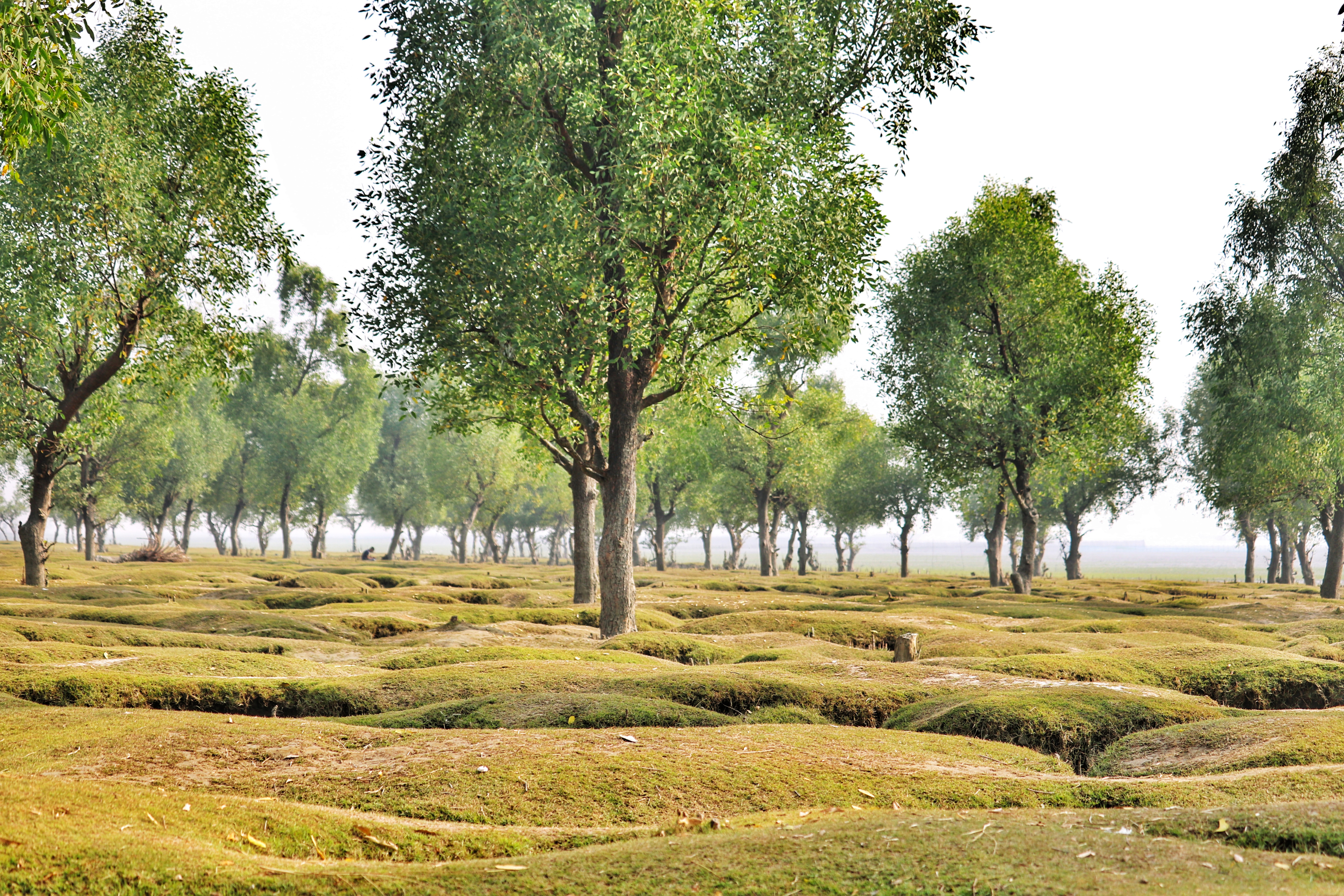

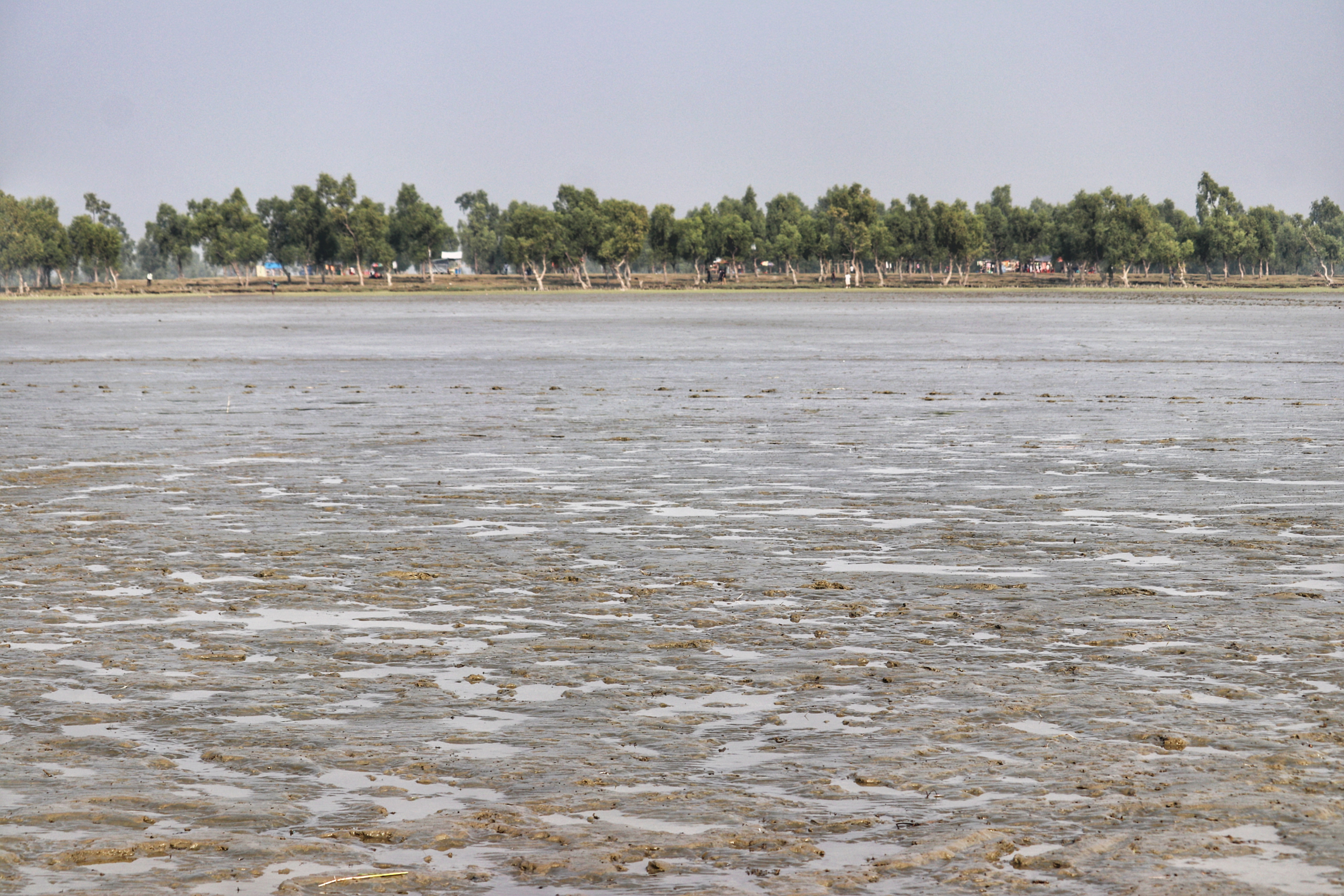

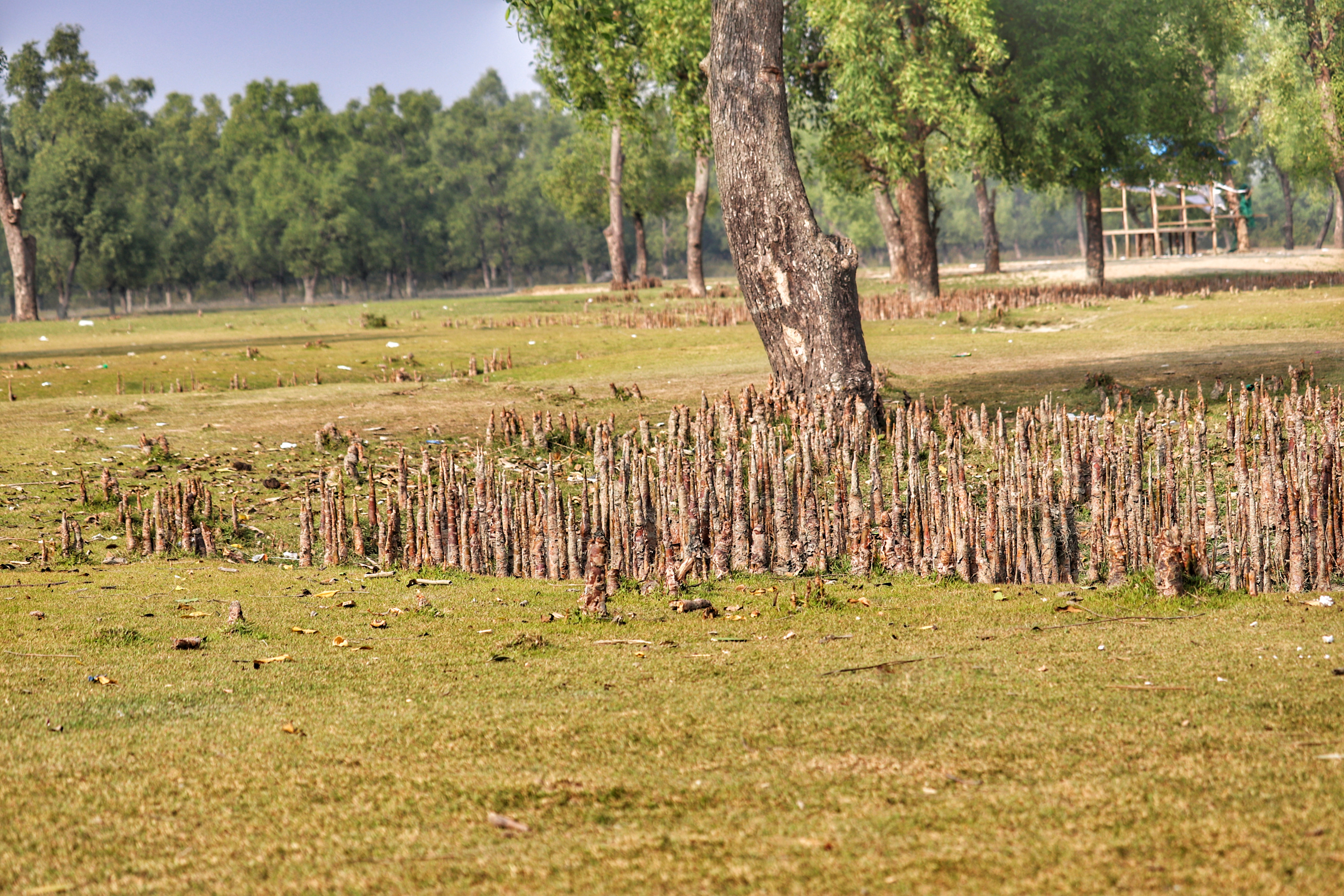

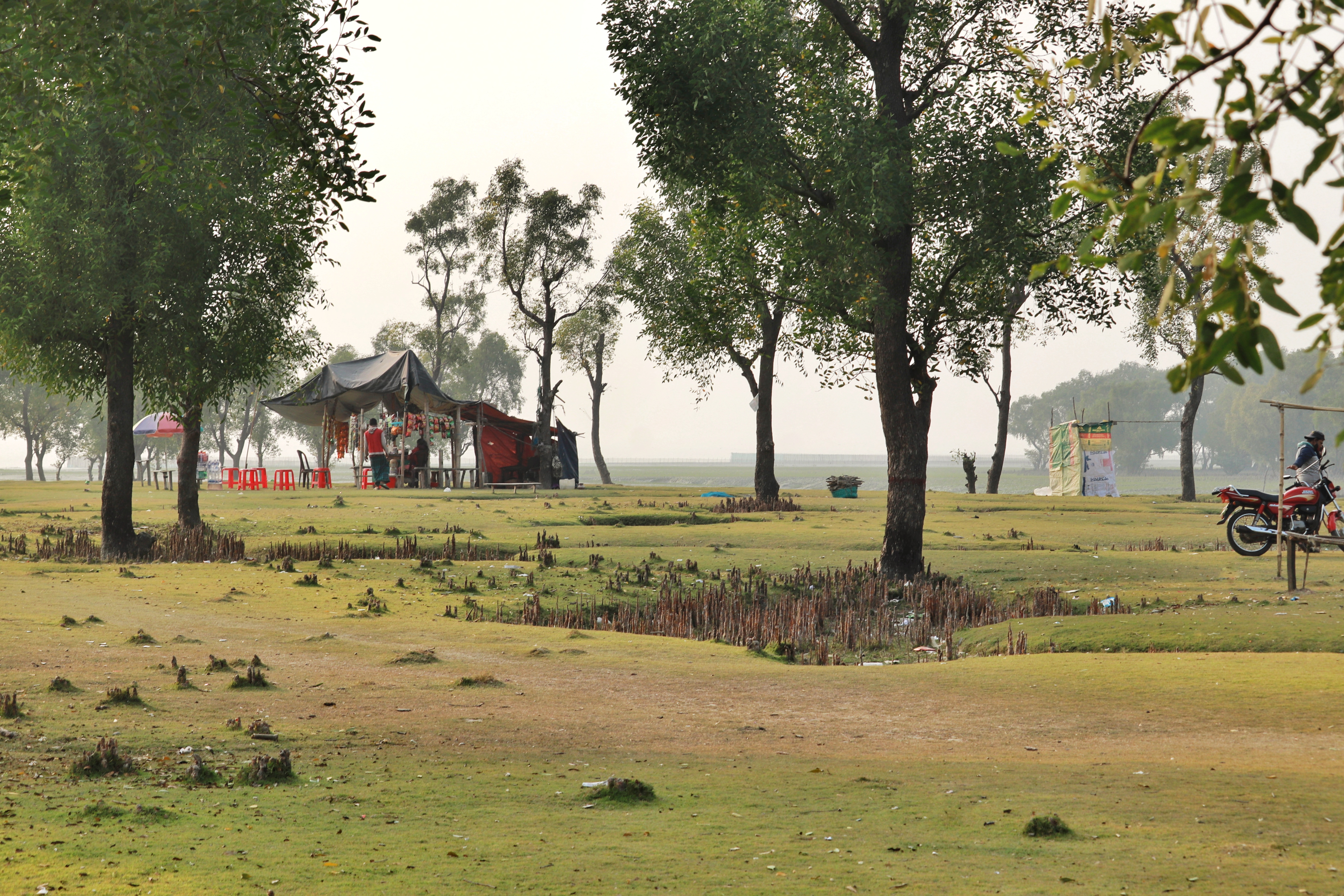

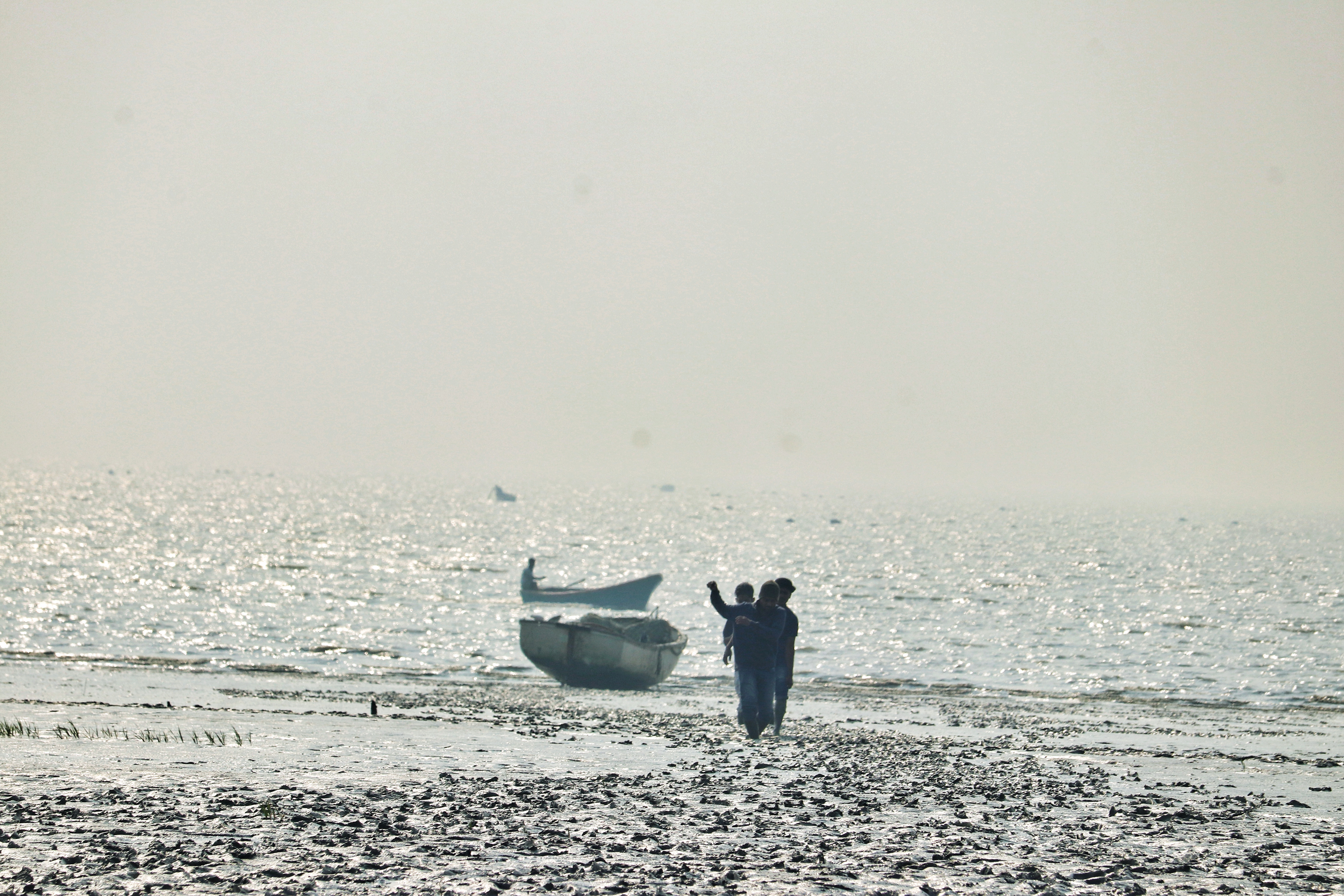

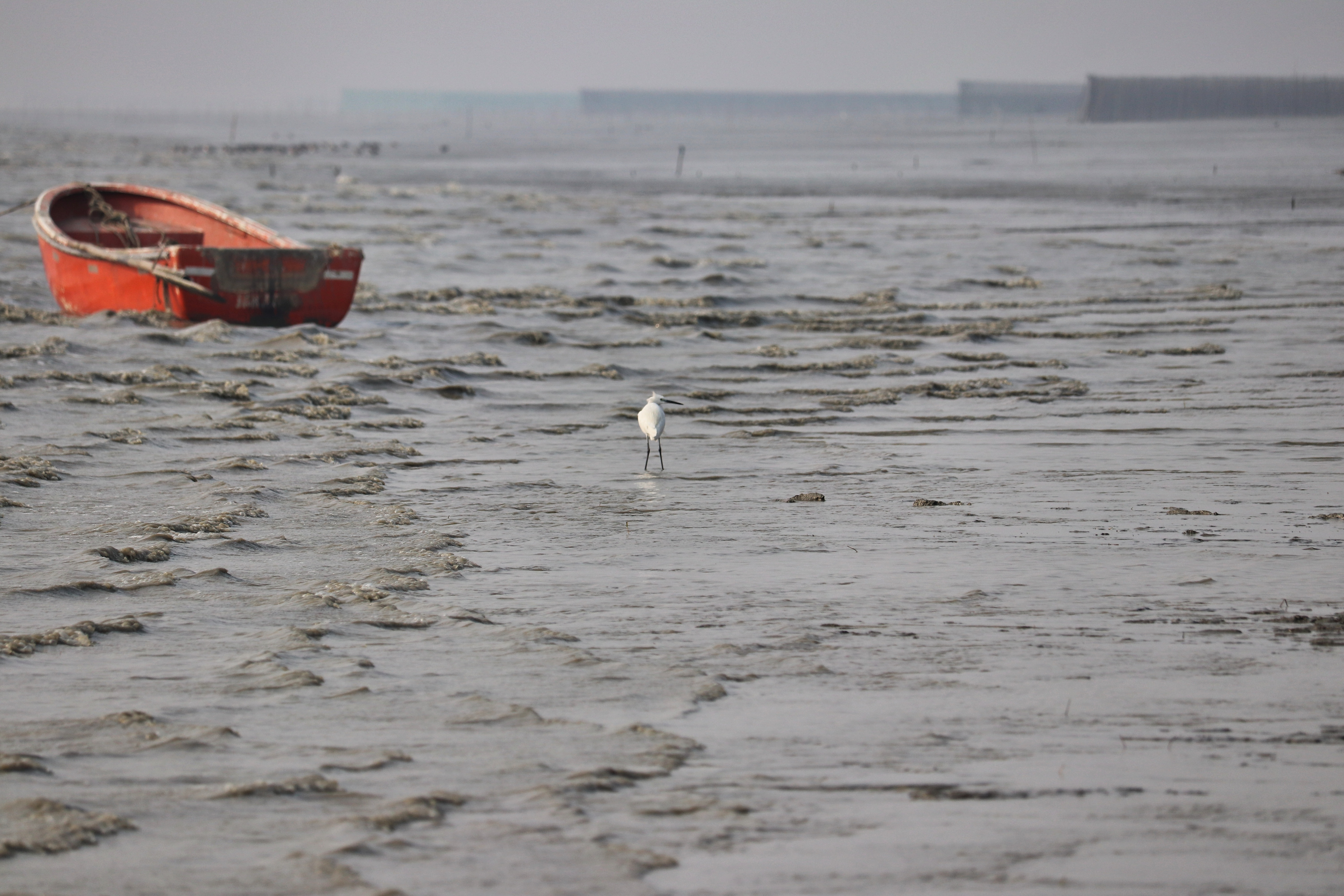

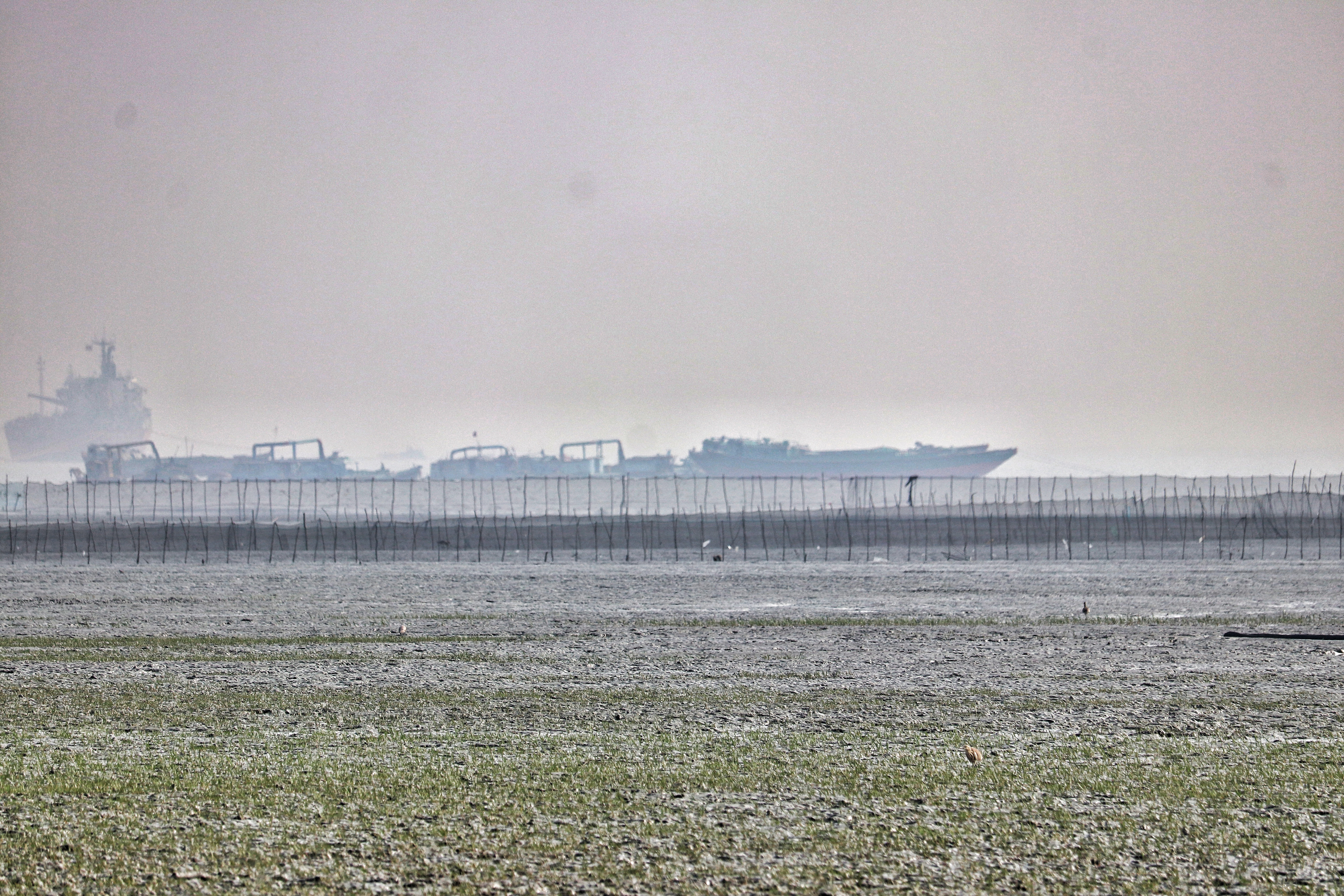

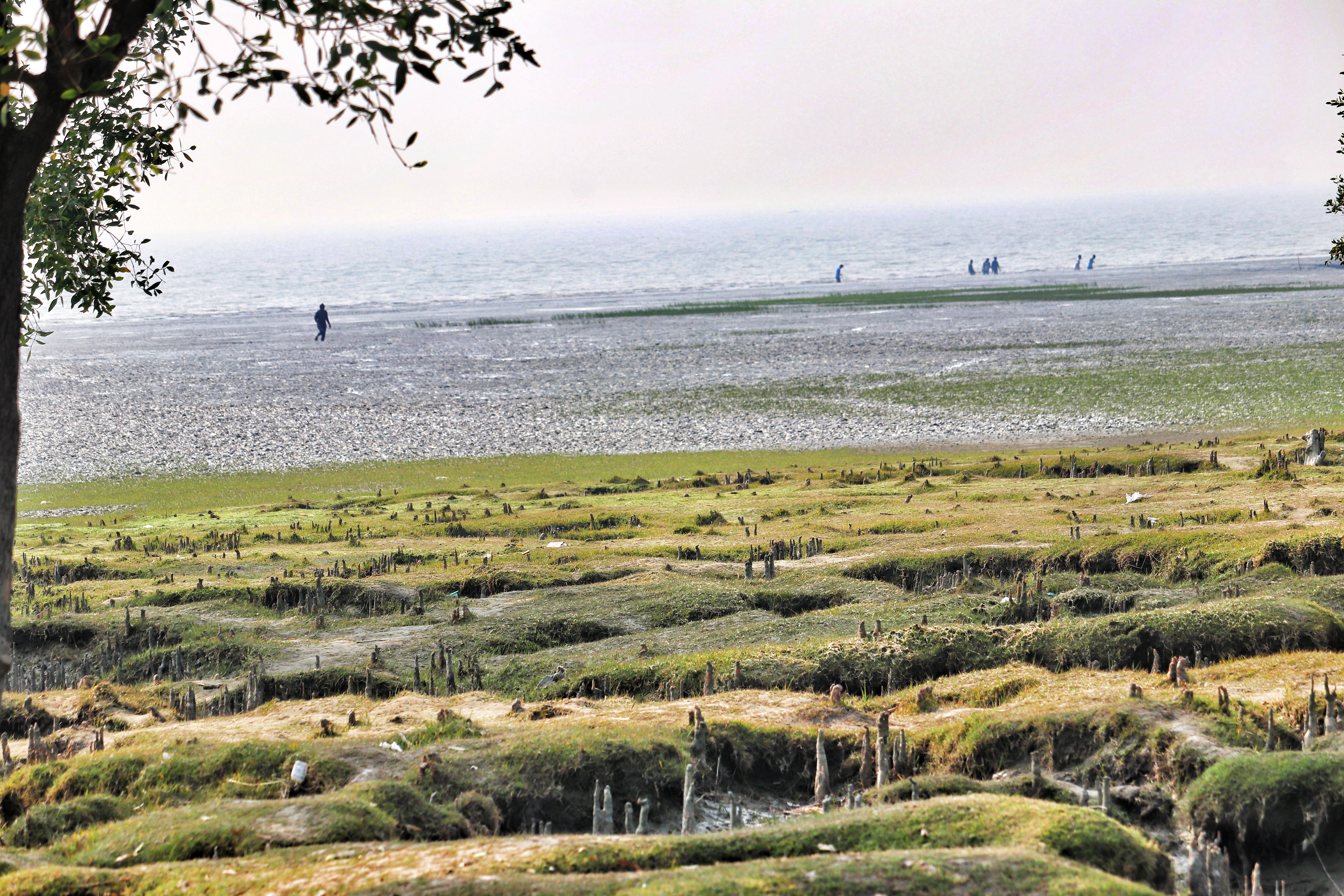

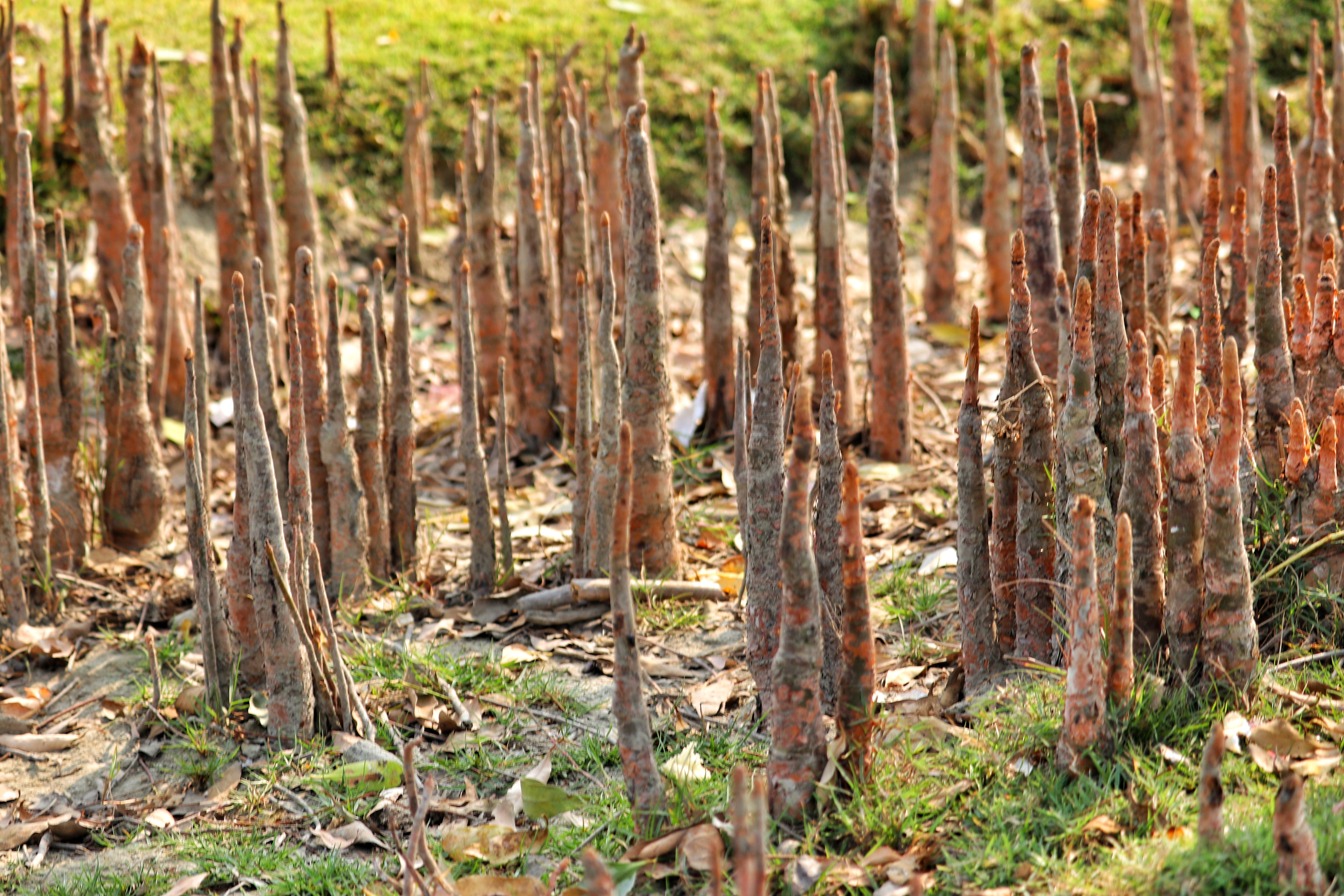

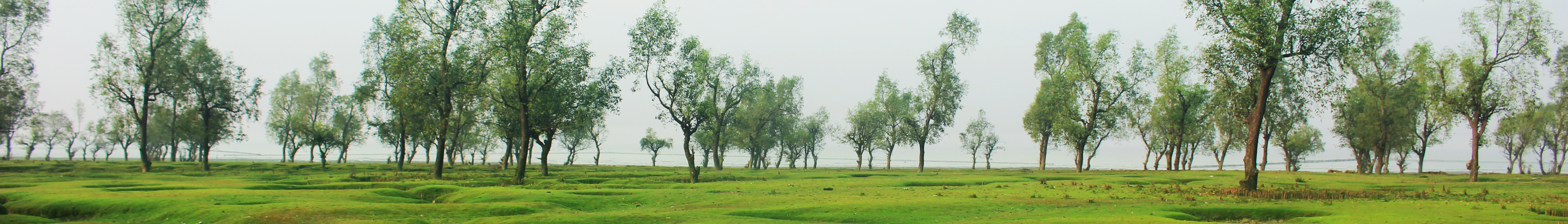

== See also ==
- Chandranath Temple
