= Prajnalok Mahasthavir =

Bangladeshi writer

- Born: Dharmaraj Barua; 31 December 1879; Vaidyapara in Boalkhali, Chittagong
- Died: 12 May 1971 (aged 91)
- Occupation(s): Scholar, writer and orator of Pali and a preacher, educationist and writer of Buddhism
- Notable work: Wrote and edited more than thirty books, including Mahavagga (1937)

Prajnalok Mahasthavir (31 December 1879–12 May 1971) was a scholar, writer and orator of Pali and a preacher, educationist and writer of Buddhism.

== Life ==
Born on 31 December 1879 as Dharmaraj Barua in the village of Vaidyapara in Boalkhali, Chittagong, he came in contact with Acharya Punnachar Mahasthavir at the age of 21. He received from the acharya shramanya and upasampada at Shakyamuni Vihara and in 1909 he studied Dharma and Vinaya at Naikhaine. Returning to Bengal, he formed an association called Zinshasan Samagam with his young vikkhu student friends to propagate Buddhism.

In Akyab, he established the Bangiya Bauddha Samity and a vihara with support from Bengali Buddhists, and was made principal of Dharmadut Vihara. In 1928, Prajnalok and Sudhanshu Bimal Barua, along with a number of Buddhists of Bengali origin, established the Buddhist Mission Press in Rangoon. The Press, which was destroyed in bombing during World War II, initiated the study of the Tripitaka in Bengali and, in 1930, started to publish the periodical Sanghashakti. When the Press was destroyed, Prajnalok walked back home through northern Burma and Assam. He died in Chittagong on 12 May 1971.

== Work ==
He wrote and edited more than thirty books, including Mahavagga (1937), a translation of Vinayapitaka published by the Tripitaka Publication Fund in Chittagong. While in Sitakunda, he translated Vikkhu Patimokhka's writings with commentaries and wrote textbooks Pali Patham Sikkhaand Vikkhu Kartavya O Grhi Kartavya. He also translated, compiled and edited Milinda Prashna (2 volumes), Theragatha, Lokaniti, Telaktaha Gatha, Pali Tripitaka (pamphlet), Prabas Suhrd, Grhiniti, Namrup, Buddher Yoganiti, Bidarshan Bhavana, Aryasatya, Dhammapada, Sutta Vibhanga and Buddher Dharma Parichaya.
