= Chandranath Hill =

Mountain in Bangladesh

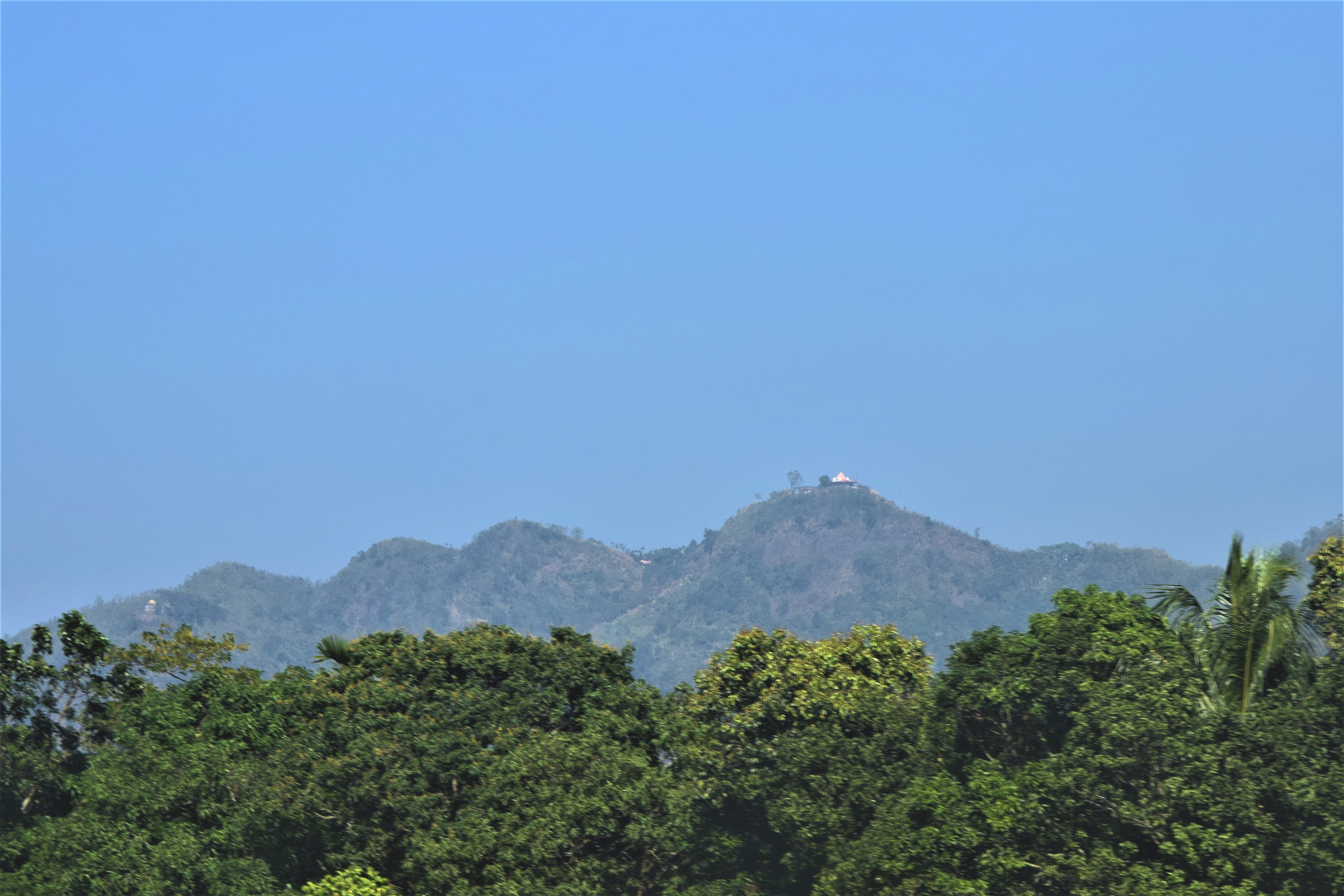
- Chandranath Hill

Highest point
- Elevation: 352 m (1,155 ft)
- Listing: List of mountains of Bangladesh
- Coordinates: 22°38′01″N 91°41′03″E

Geography
- Location within Bangladesh
- Location: Sitakunda Upazila, Chittagong

Geology
- Mountain type: Mountain

Chandranath Hill is the highest peak of the Chittagong Western Hill Range. The hill range is the eastern part of the Himalayas separated from the Himalayas. This hill goes south and south-east of the Himalayas and crosses the Feni River through Assam and Tripura states of India and joins Chittagong District, Bangladesh. From the Feni river to the Chittagong city, it is about 70 kilometers long. Sitakunda Botanical Garden and Eco-Park is built on the foothills of this hill.

== Height and Peak ==
Chandranath Peak, situated in the Western range of Chittagong, is about 1152 feet (around) high and is the highest point in Chittagong District. Ambernama height is 900 feet and Saijjydala height is 801 feet. Chittagong North-Western Range The elevation decreases near the Karnaphuli River in Chittagong City. Batali Hill on the outskirts of Chittagong city is 280 feet high and Nangarkhana a little north of the city is 298 feet high.

== Waterfalls and fountain ==
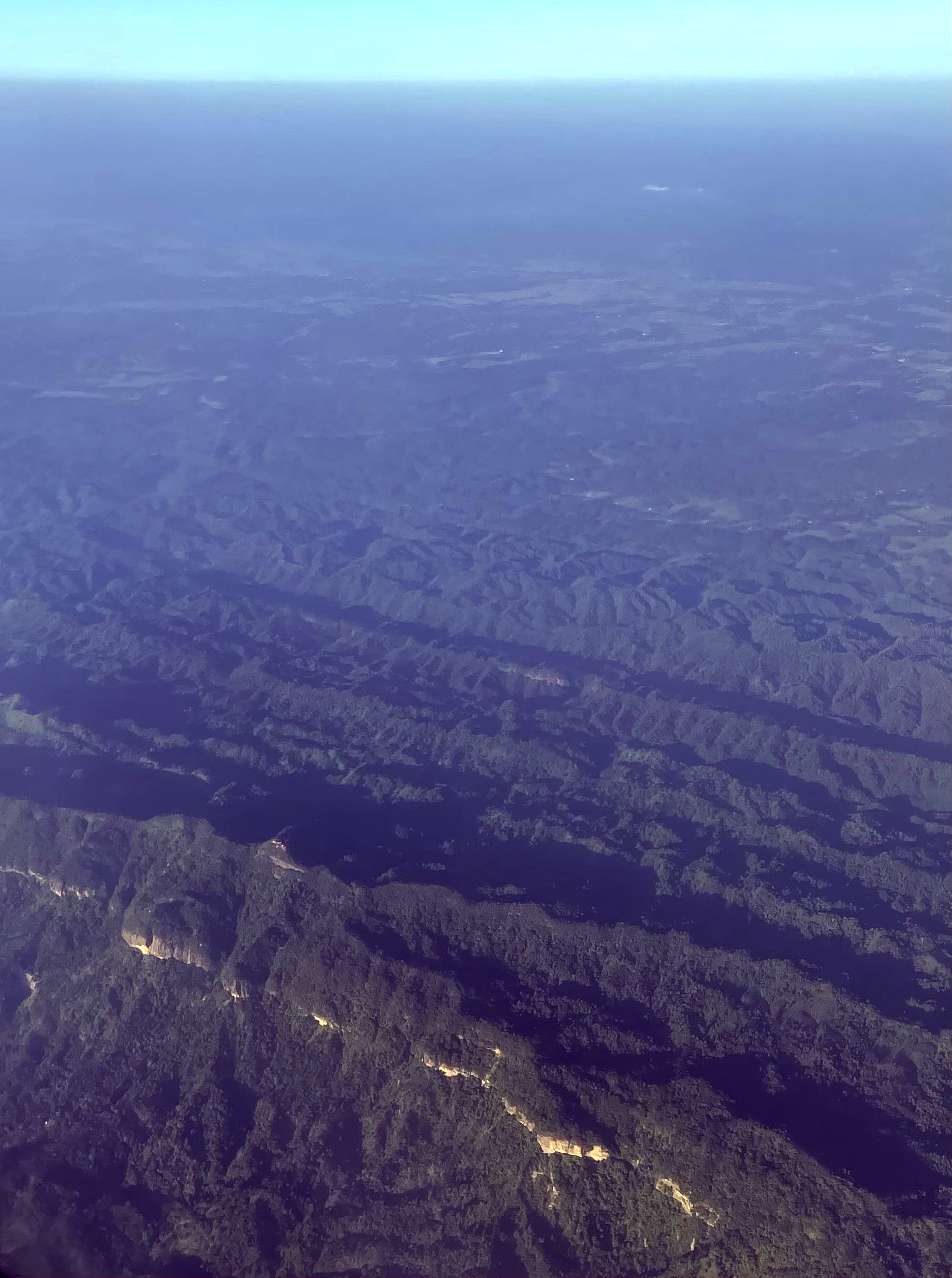
Aerial view of Chandranath Hill and Temple (on the peak) on the foreground, with Chittagong hill tracts in the background

There are two waterfalls named Shahasradhara and Suptadhara. there are many more fountains and waterfalls, From this hill on the east, some of the fountains and canals have been gathered in the halda river. Among them, Ghazaria, Bermasia, Fatikchari, Harulalchari and Boalia are the main. On the west, Mahamaya, Mitha Chhara and many other canal and waterfalls have fallen into the Bay of Bengal. Now a rubber dam is built on Mahamaya canal. It is the second-largest man-made lake in Bangladesh after Kaptai Lake.

== Trekking ==
Upon reaching the base, the Chandranath trail divides into two routes. The left path, a natural dirt trail through forested areas and traditional Tipra villages, is generally preferred for the ascent due to its gentler gradient. The right path consists mainly of steep concrete and stone stairs and is commonly used for the descent, providing safer footing than the often slippery dirt trail.

== Gallery ==
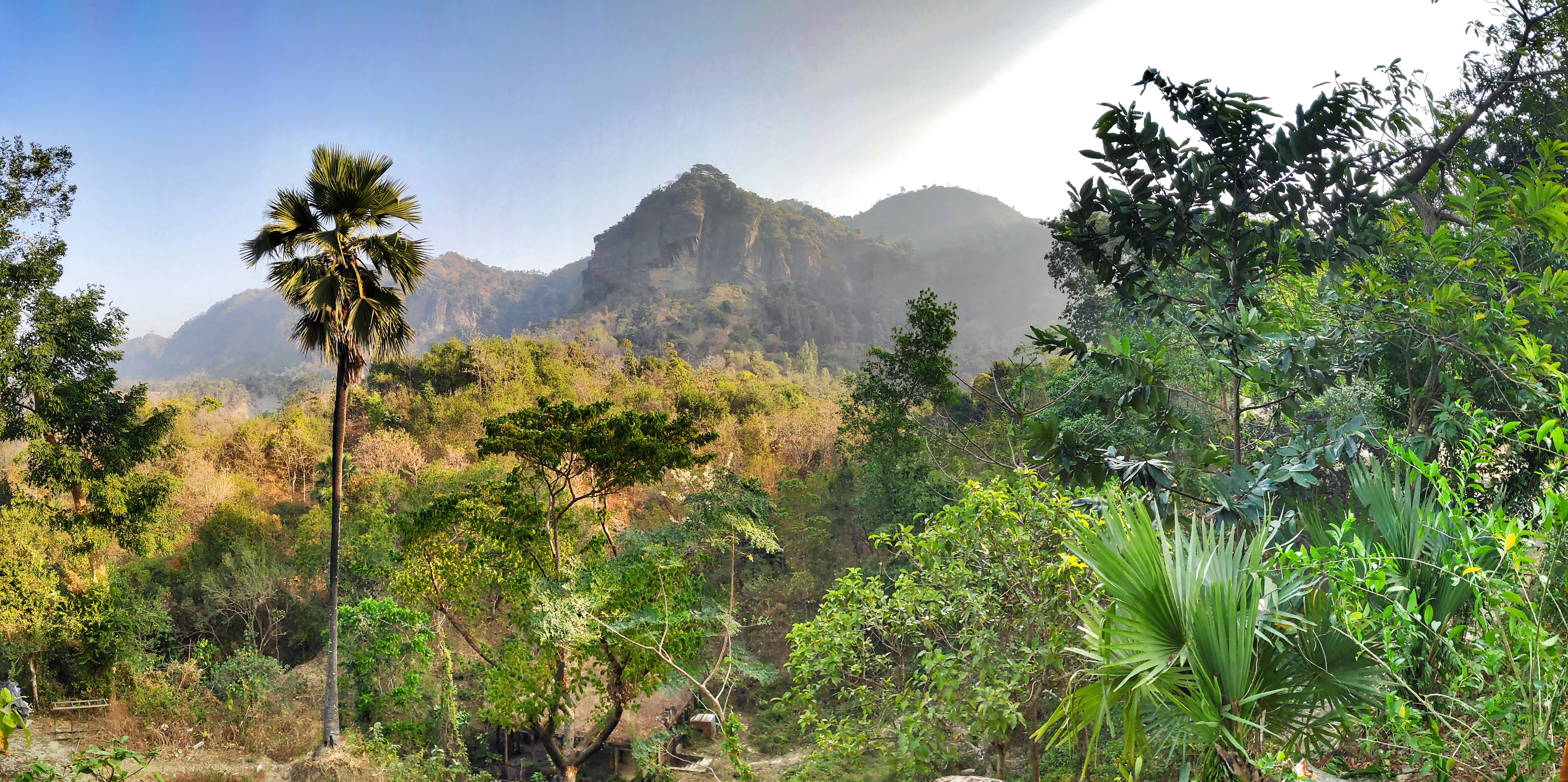

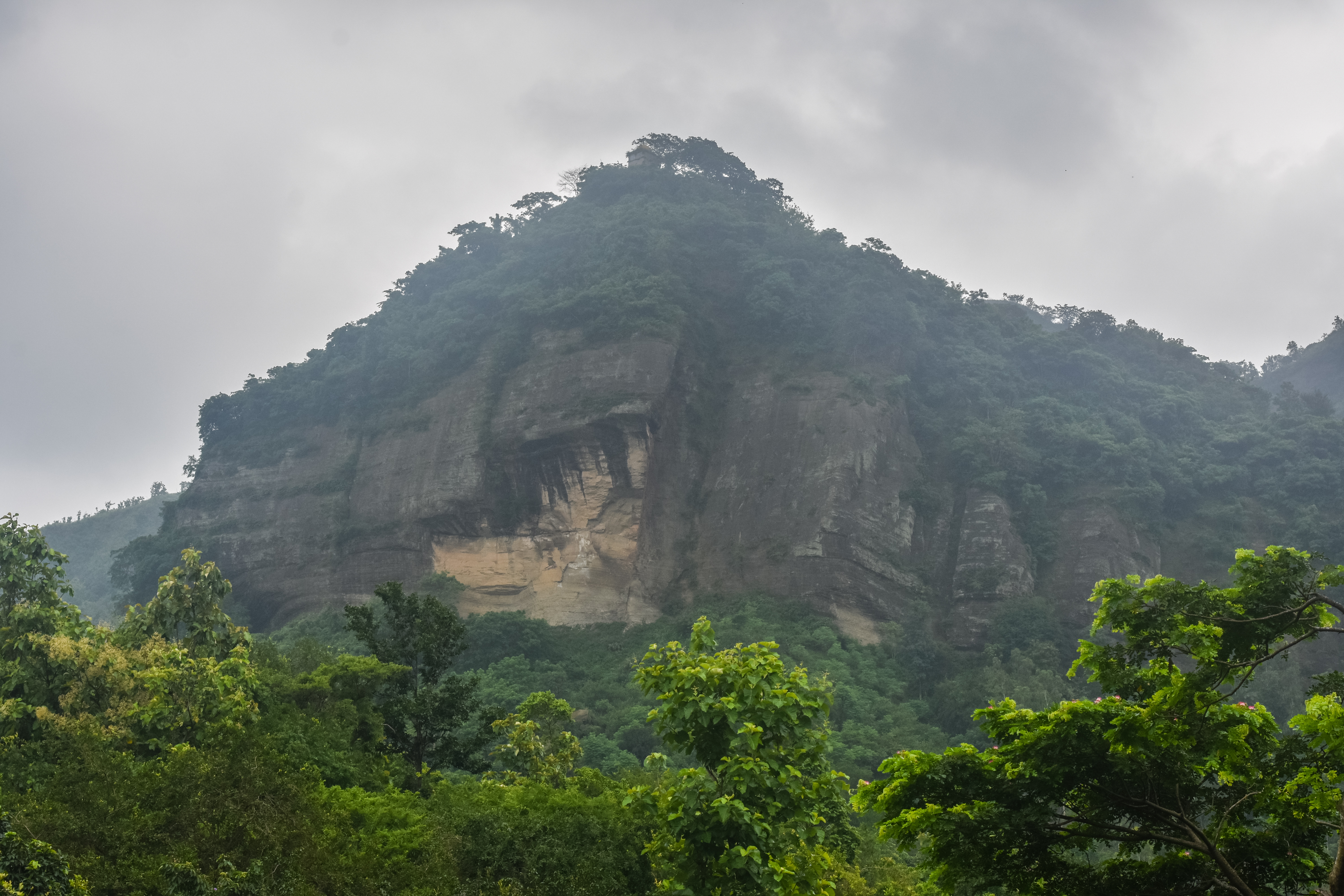

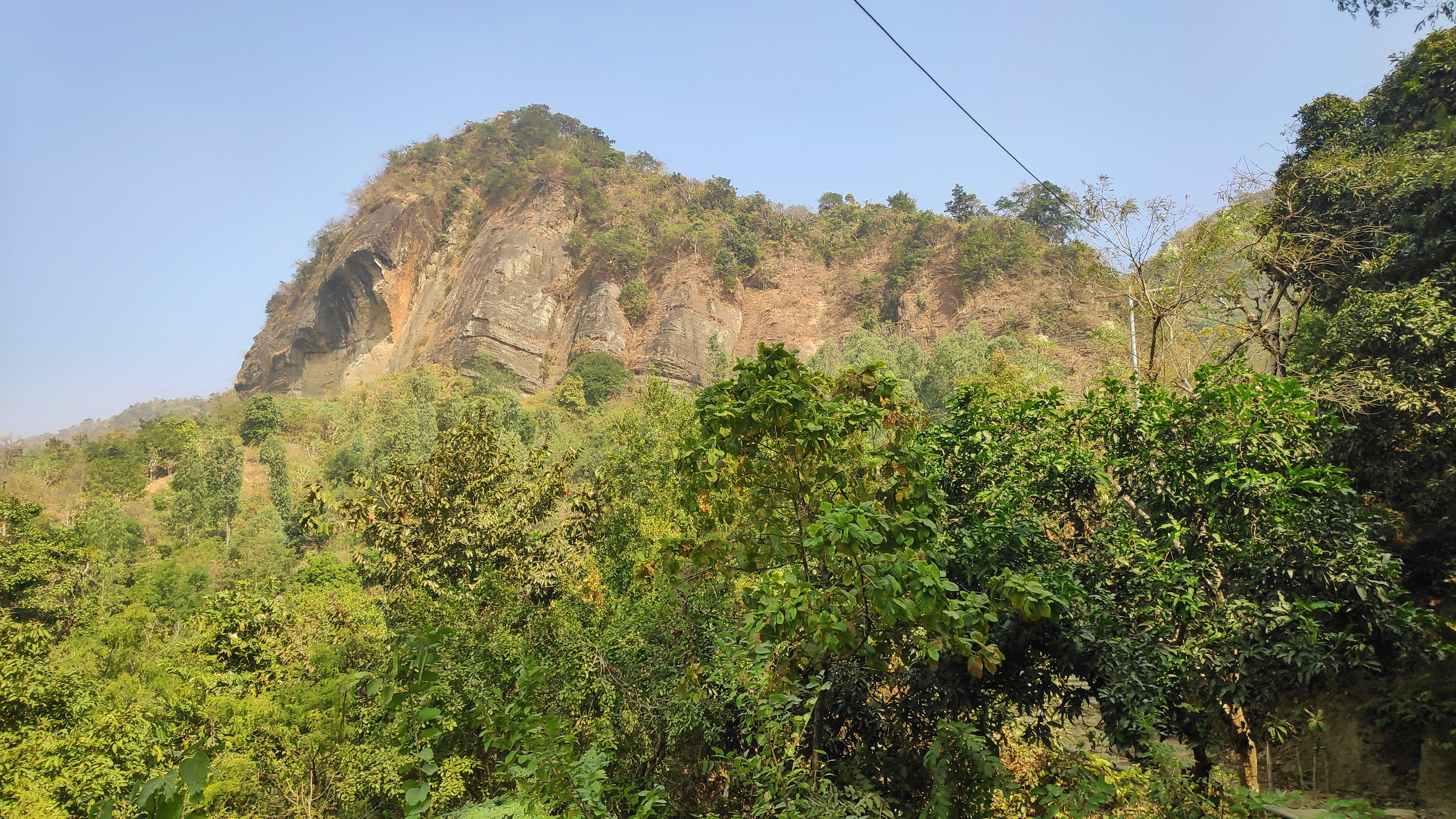

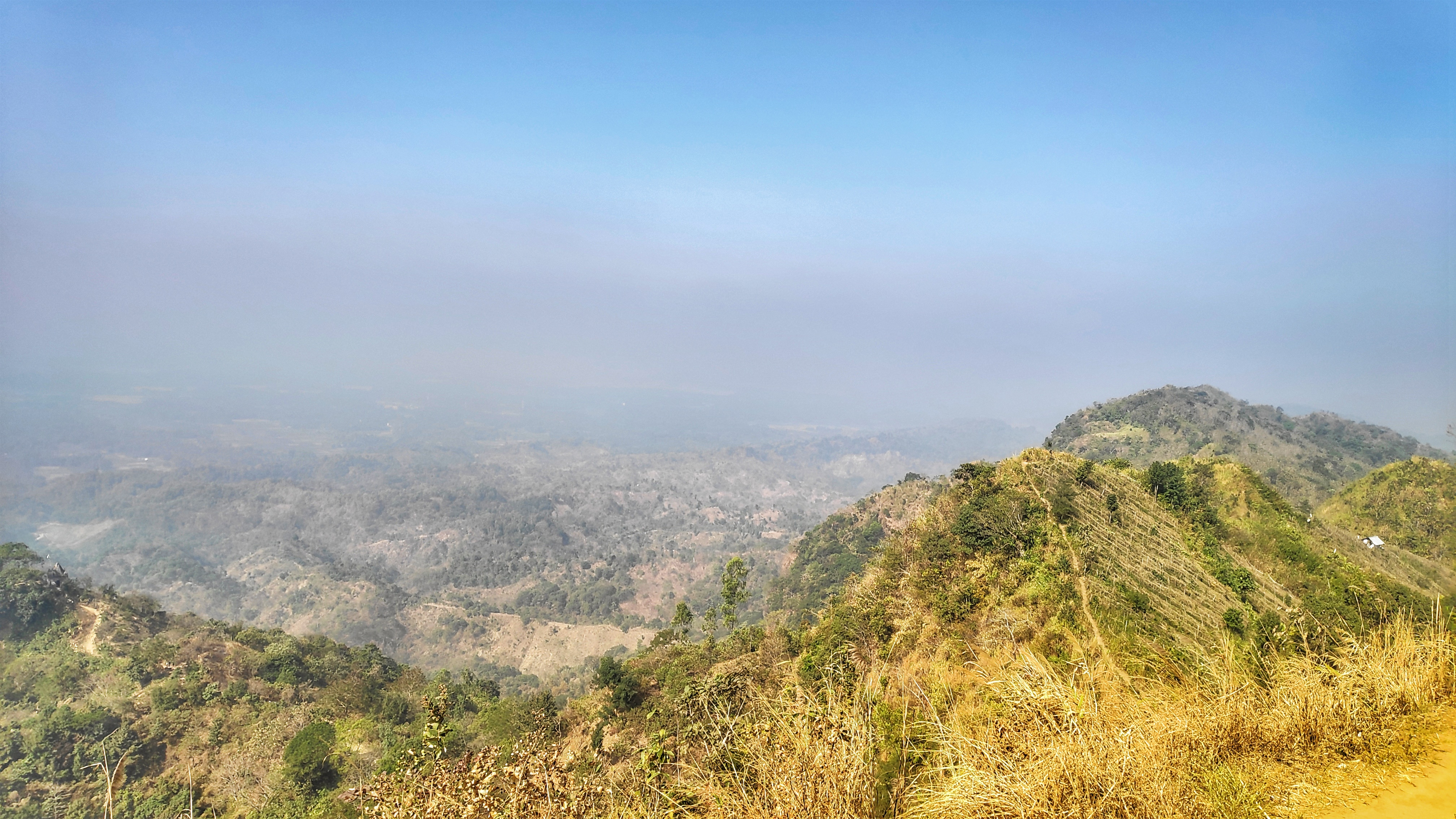

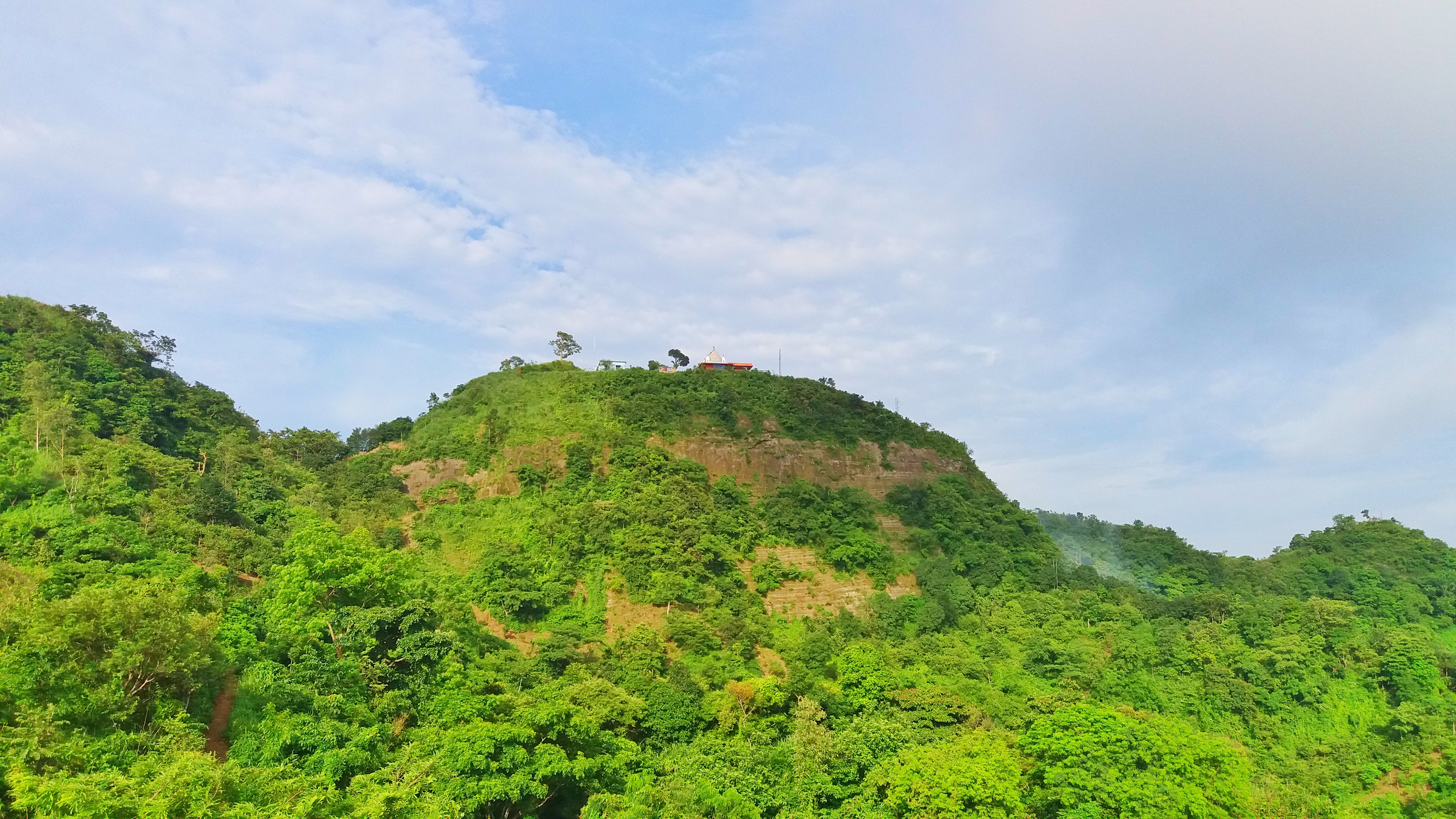

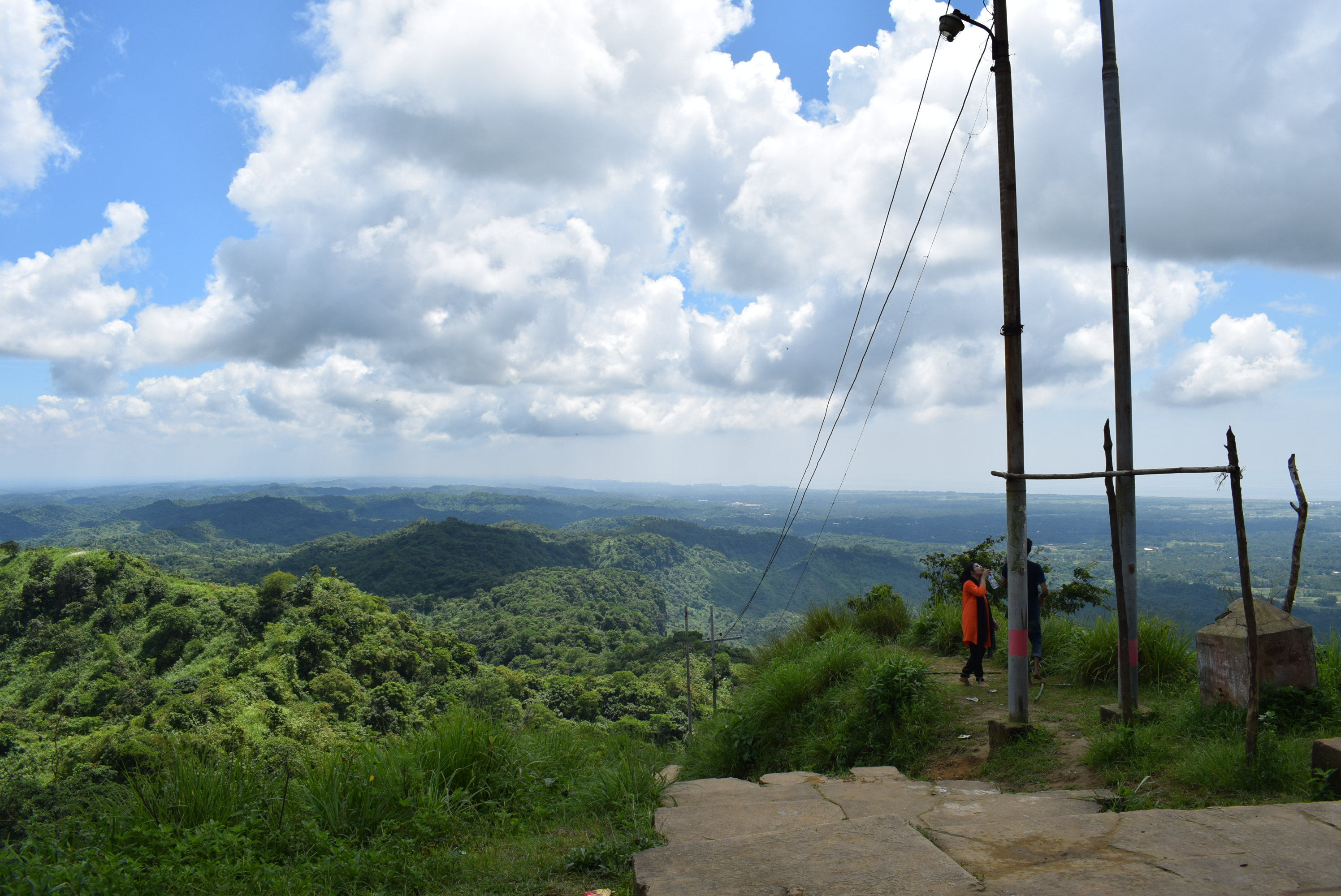

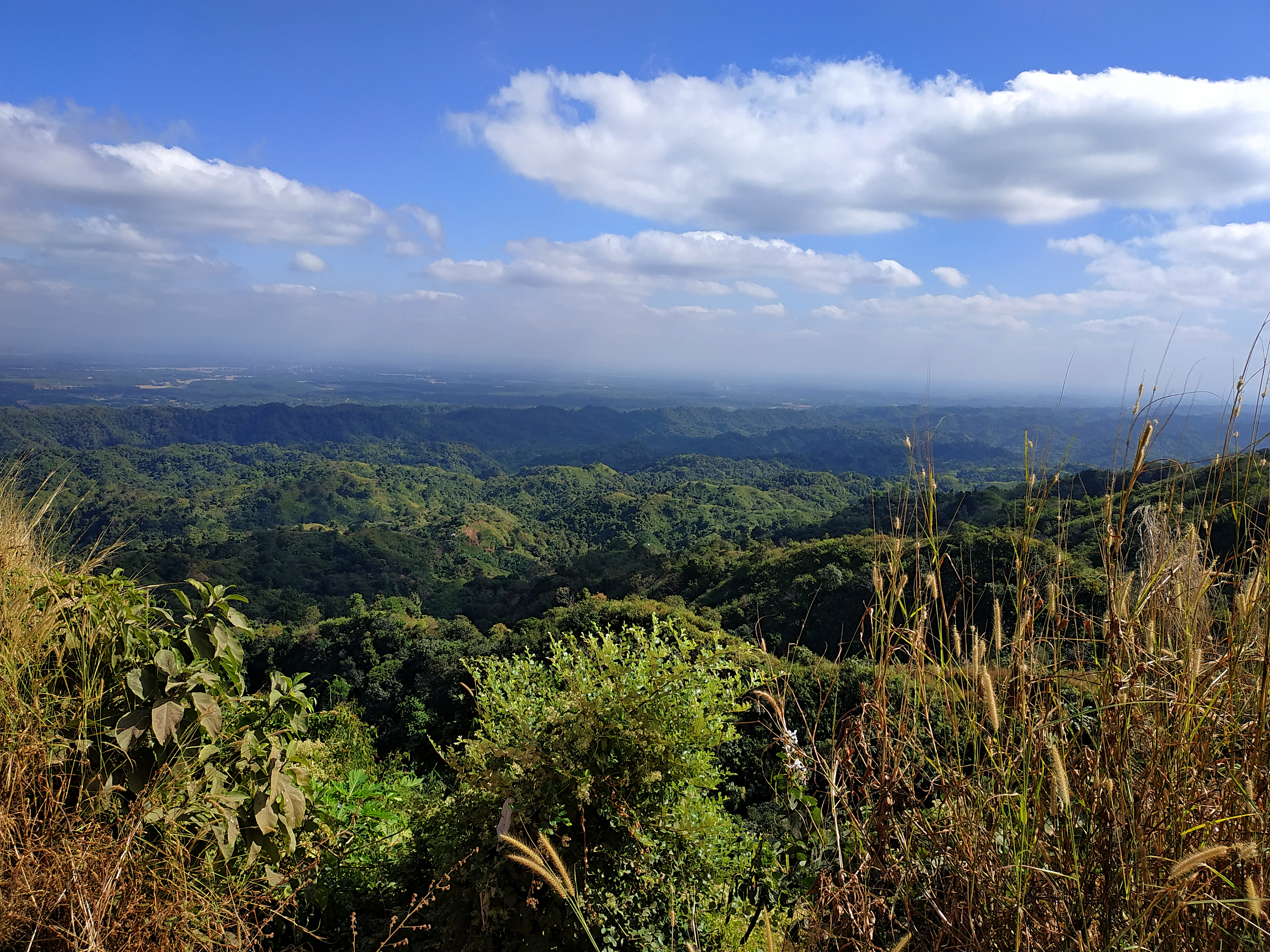

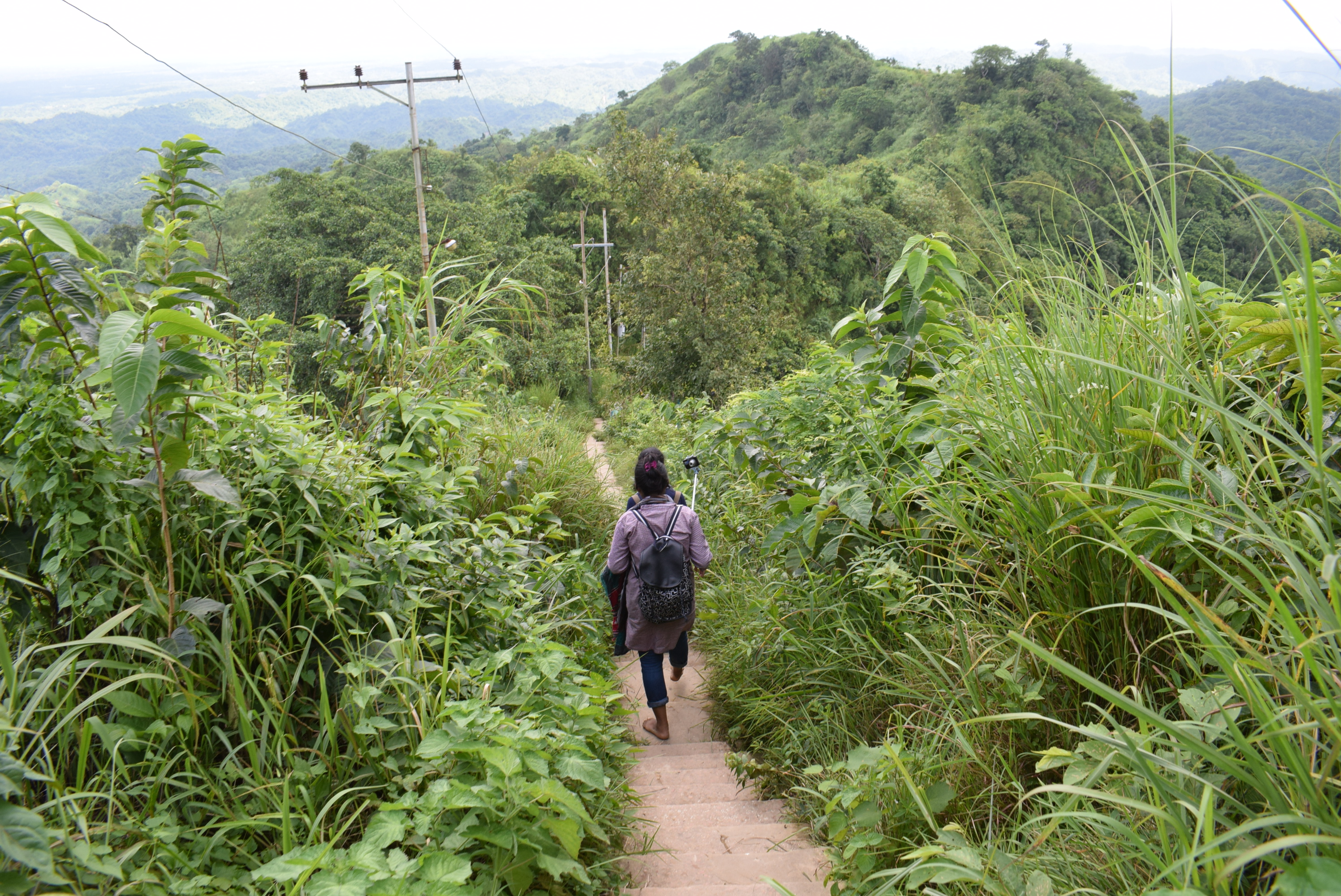

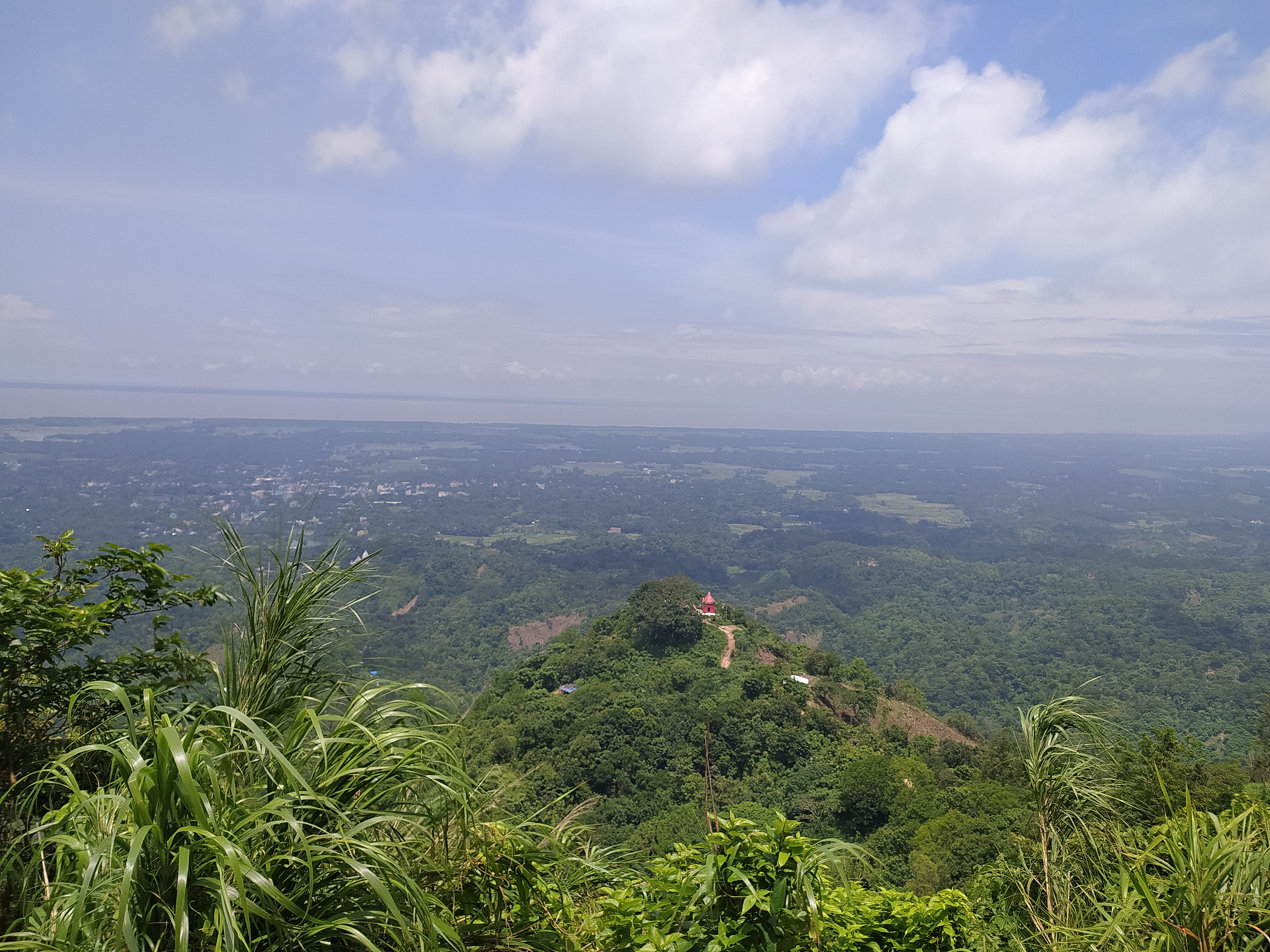
