= Chandranath Temple =

Hindu temple in Bangladesh

- চন্দ্রনাথ মন্দির
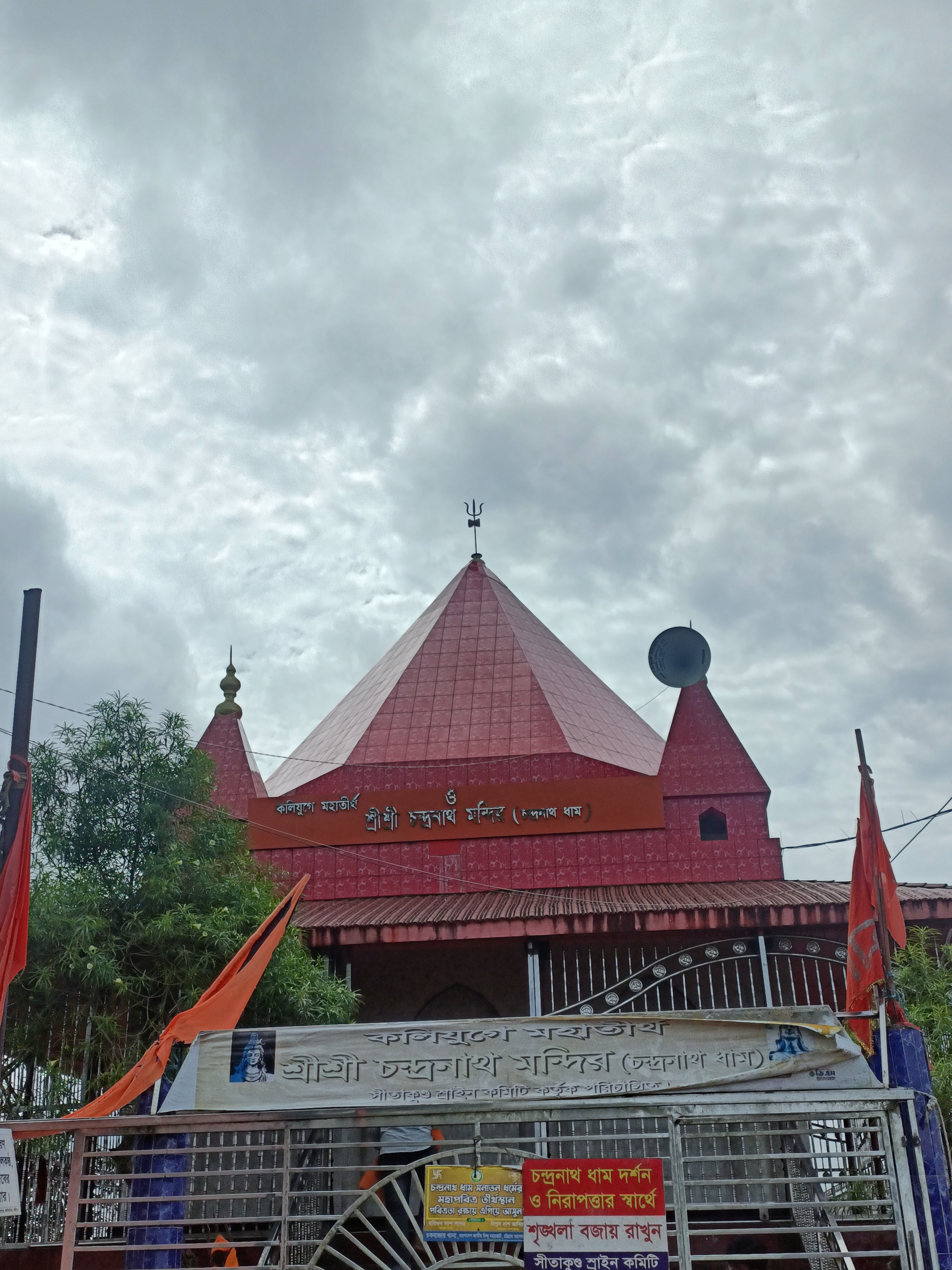
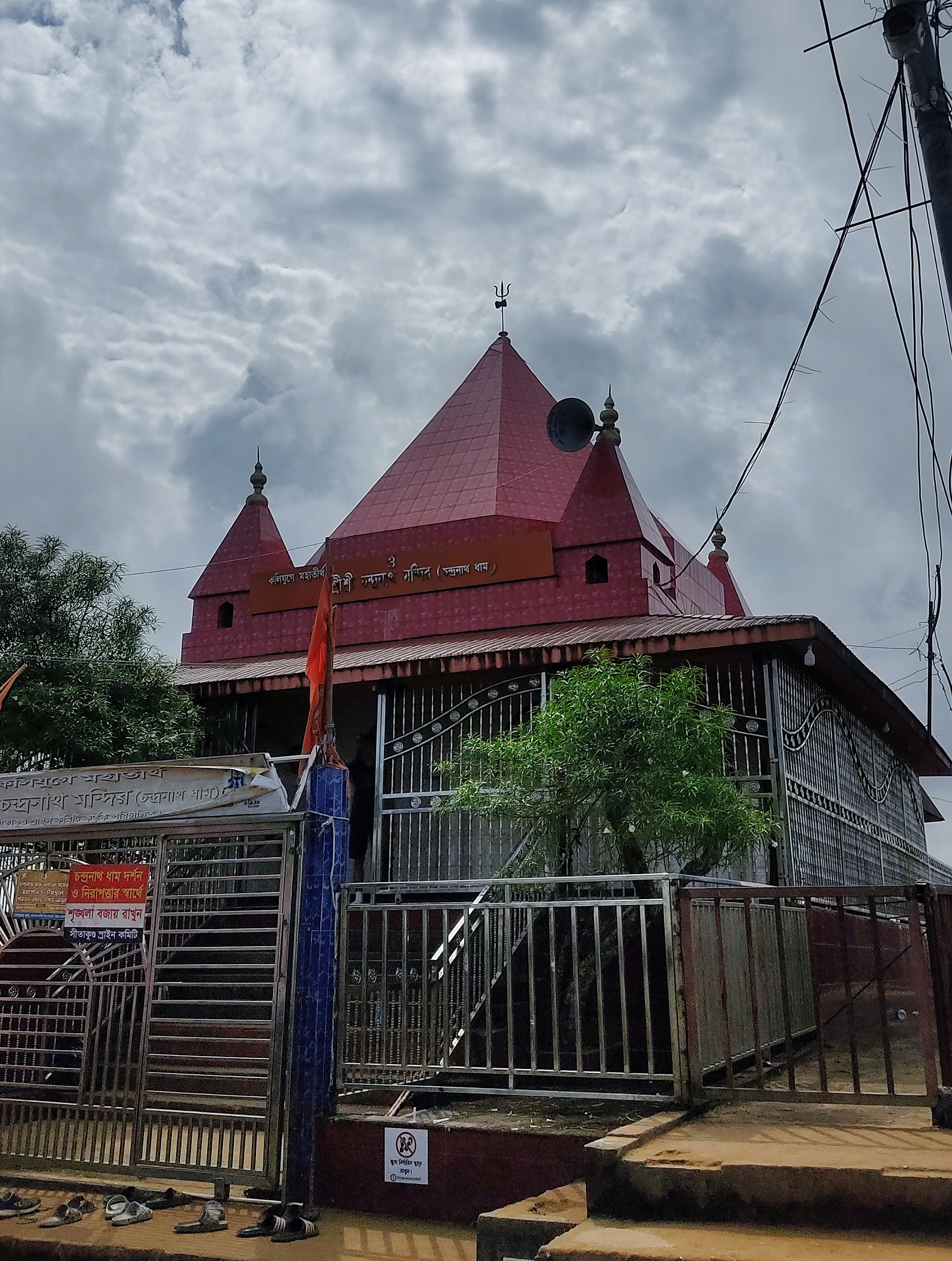
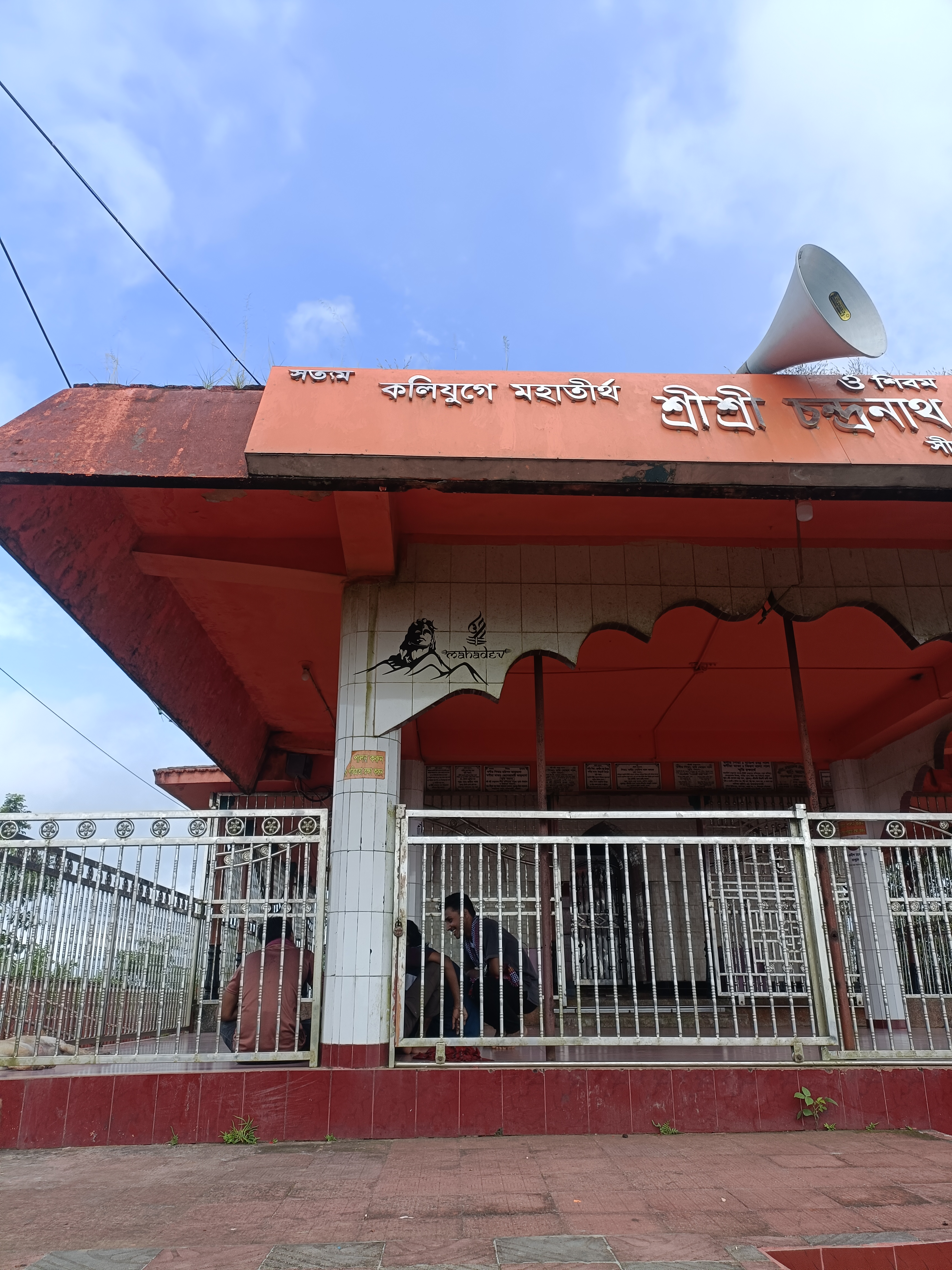
- Chandranath Temple in October 2025

- Location within Bangladesh

Religion
- Affiliation: Hinduism
- District: Chittagong

Location
- Location: Chandranath Hill, Sitakunda
- Country: Bangladesh
- Interactive map of Chandranath Temple
- Coordinates: 22°38′01.0″N 91°41′03.5″E

Architecture
- Elevation: 310 m (1,017 ft)

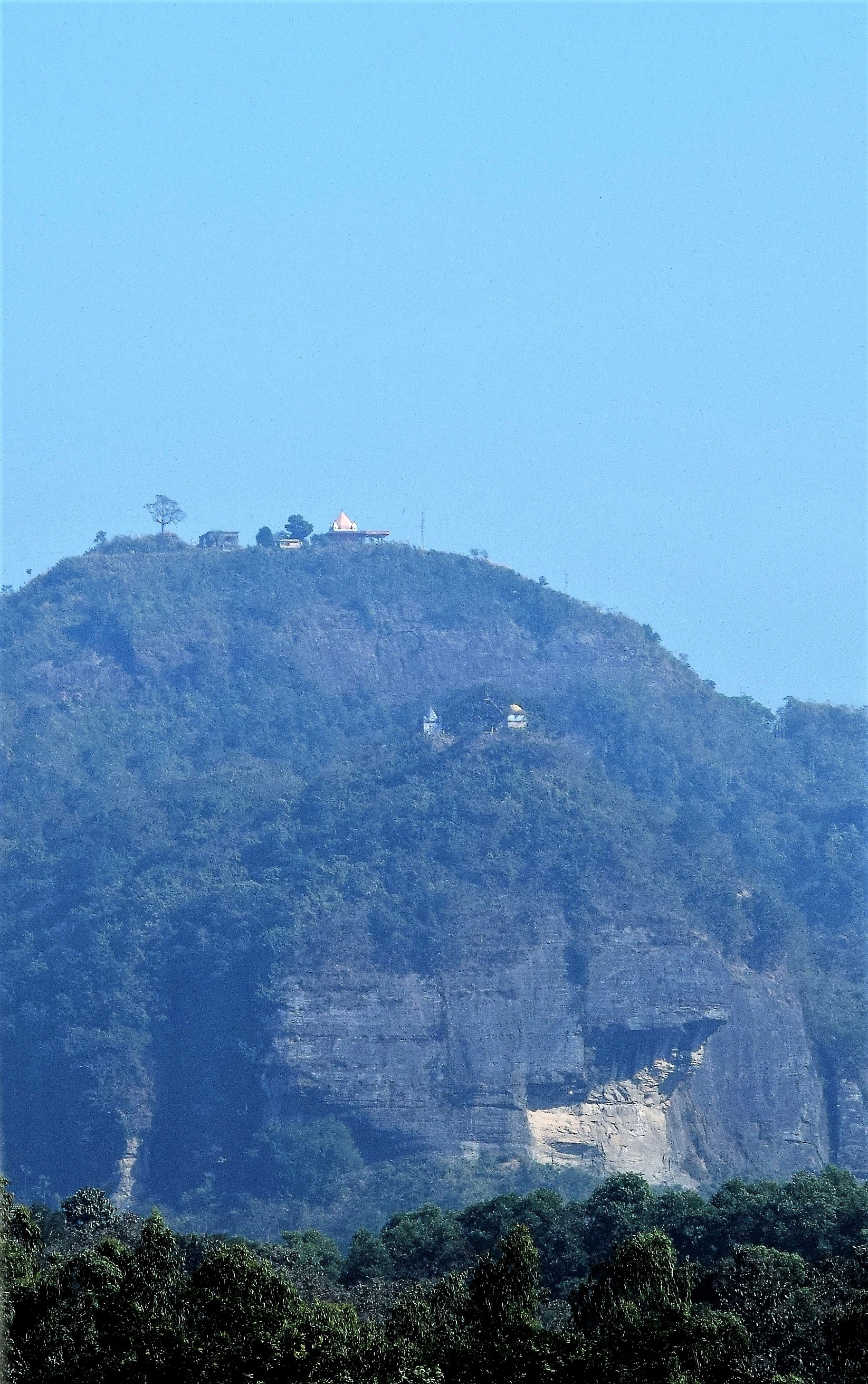
Chandranath Temple, which sits atop the hill of the same name, as seen from Dhaka-Chittagong railroad. Birupaksha Temple can also be seen near the centre of the photo.

Chandranath Temple (Bengali: চন্দ্রনাথ মন্দির or Chandronath mondir), located on top of the Chandranath Hill, is a famous Shakta pitha located near Chittagong in Bangladesh where, as per Hindu sacred texts, the right arm of Deiti Sati fell. Chandranath Temple is a pilgrimage site for Hindus. It is located 1,020 feet (310 m) above sea level (according to Google Maps).

== Historical references ==
The temple is believed to date back to the 11th century, and it holds historical and religious significance for Hindus. The Rajmala states that about 800 years ago, Raja Biswambhar Sur, a descendant of the famous Adisur of Gaur, tried to reach Chandranath by sea. The Nigamkalpataru refers to the poet Jayadev living for a time in Chandranath. By the time of Dhanya Manikya, ruler of Tripura, Chandranath received numerous endowments. Dhanya Manikya attempted to remove the idol of Shiva from the temple to his kingdom but failed.

== Legend ==
Sati was the first wife of Shiva as the first incarnation of Parvati. She was the daughter of King Daksha and Queen (the daughter of Brahma). She committed self-immolation at the sacrificial fire of a yagna performed by her father Daksha as she felt seriously distraught by her father's insult of her husband and her by not inviting them for the yagna. Shiva was so grieved after hearing of the death of his wife that he danced around the world in a Tandav Nritya (“devastating penance” or dance of destruction) carrying Sati's dead body over his shoulders.

Perturbed by this situation and to bring Shiv to a state of normalcy, Vishnu decided to use his Sudarshan Chakra (the rotating discus carried on his fingertips). He dismembered Sati's body with the chakra into 51 pieces. Wherever her body fell on the earth, the place was consecrated as a divine shrine to Shakthi Peeth with Sati (Parvati) and Shiva deities. These locations have become famous pilgrimage places as Pithas or Shakthi Pithas are found scattered all over the subcontinent, including Pakistan, Bangladesh, Sri Lanka, and Nepal, apart from India.

Sati is also known as Devi or Shakthi, and with the blessings of Vishnu, she was reborn as the daughter of Himavat or Himalayas and hence named as Parvati (daughter of mountains). She was born on the 14th day of the bright half of the month of Mrigashīrsha, which marks the Shivarathri (Shiva's night) festival.

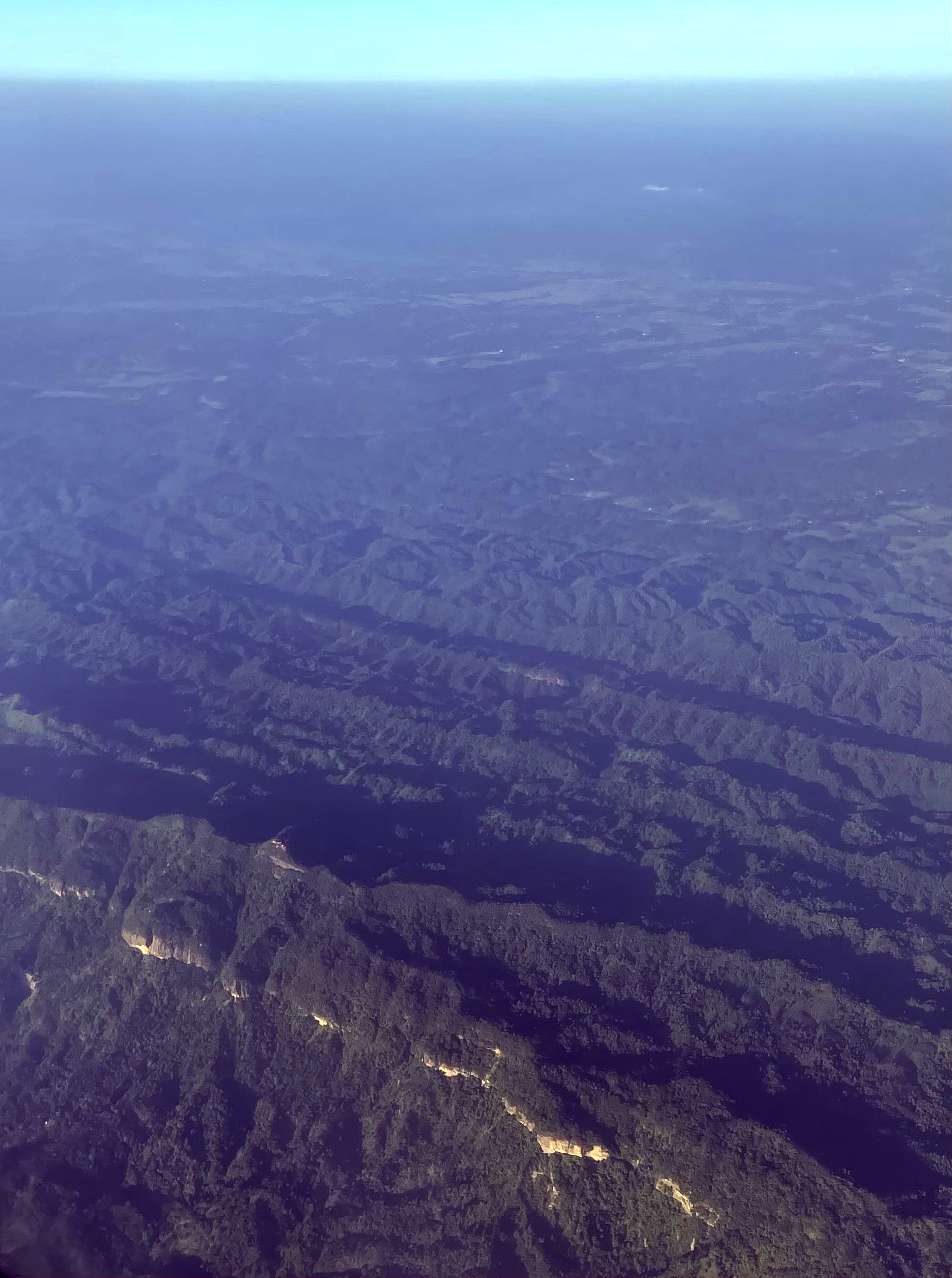
Aerial view of Chandranath Hill and Temple (on the peak) in the foreground, with Chittagong Hill Tracts in the background.

== The Chandranath Temple as a Shakta pitha ==
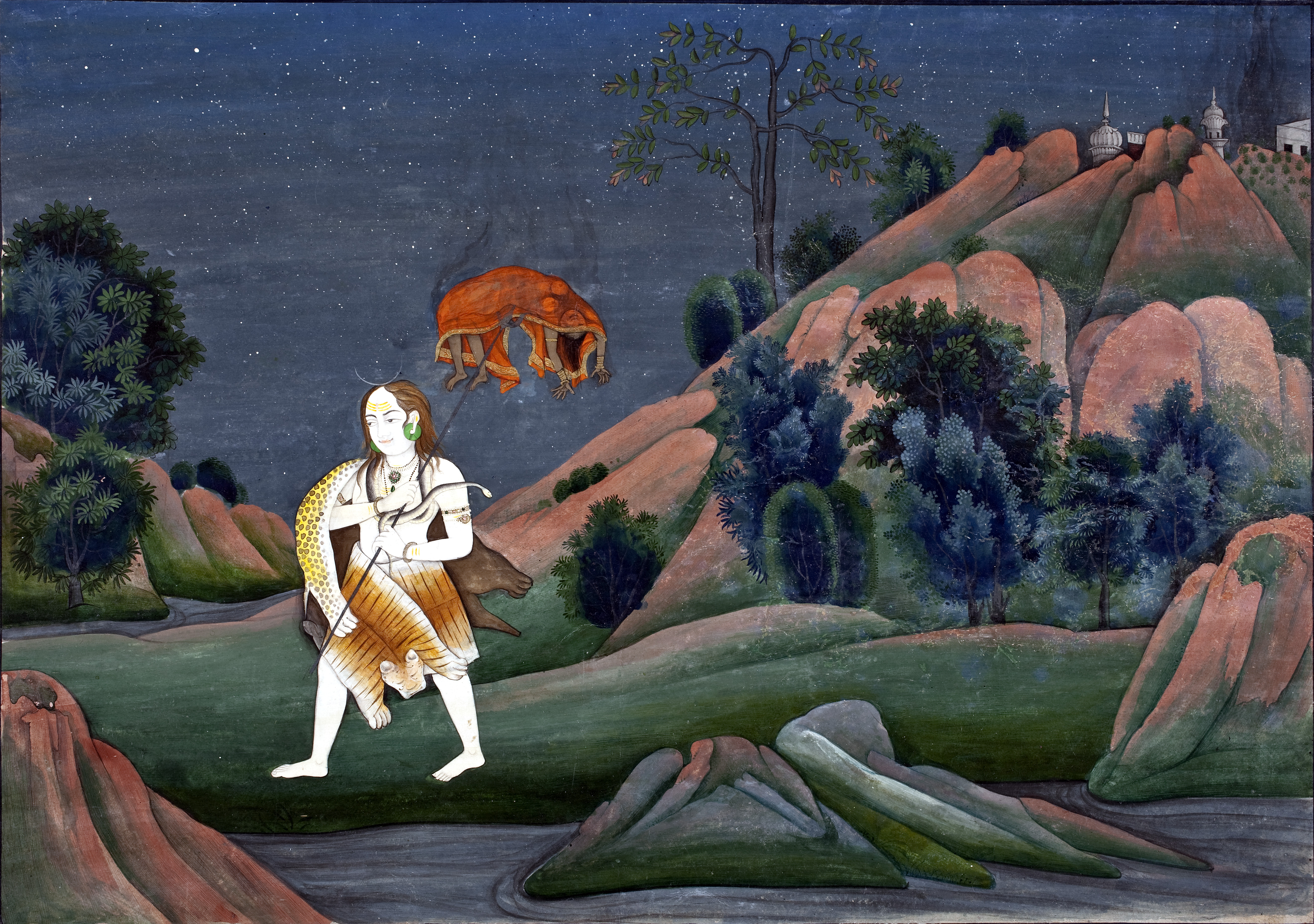
Shiva carrying the corpse of Sati Devi

The Chandranath Temple is considered a Shakta pitha, the revered shrines of Shaktism. The mythology of Daksha yaga and Sati's self-immolation is the source mythology behind the origin of Shakta pithas. Shakta pithas are divine shrines of Shakti, due to the falling of body parts of the corpse of Sati Devi, when Lord Shiva carried it and wandered throughout Aryavartha in sorrow. 51 Shakta pithas are linked to the 51 alphabets in Sanskrit. Each temple has shrines for Shakti and Kalabhairava. The Right Arm of Sati Devi's corpse is believed to have fallen here. The Shakti is known by the name Bhavani.

== Gallery ==
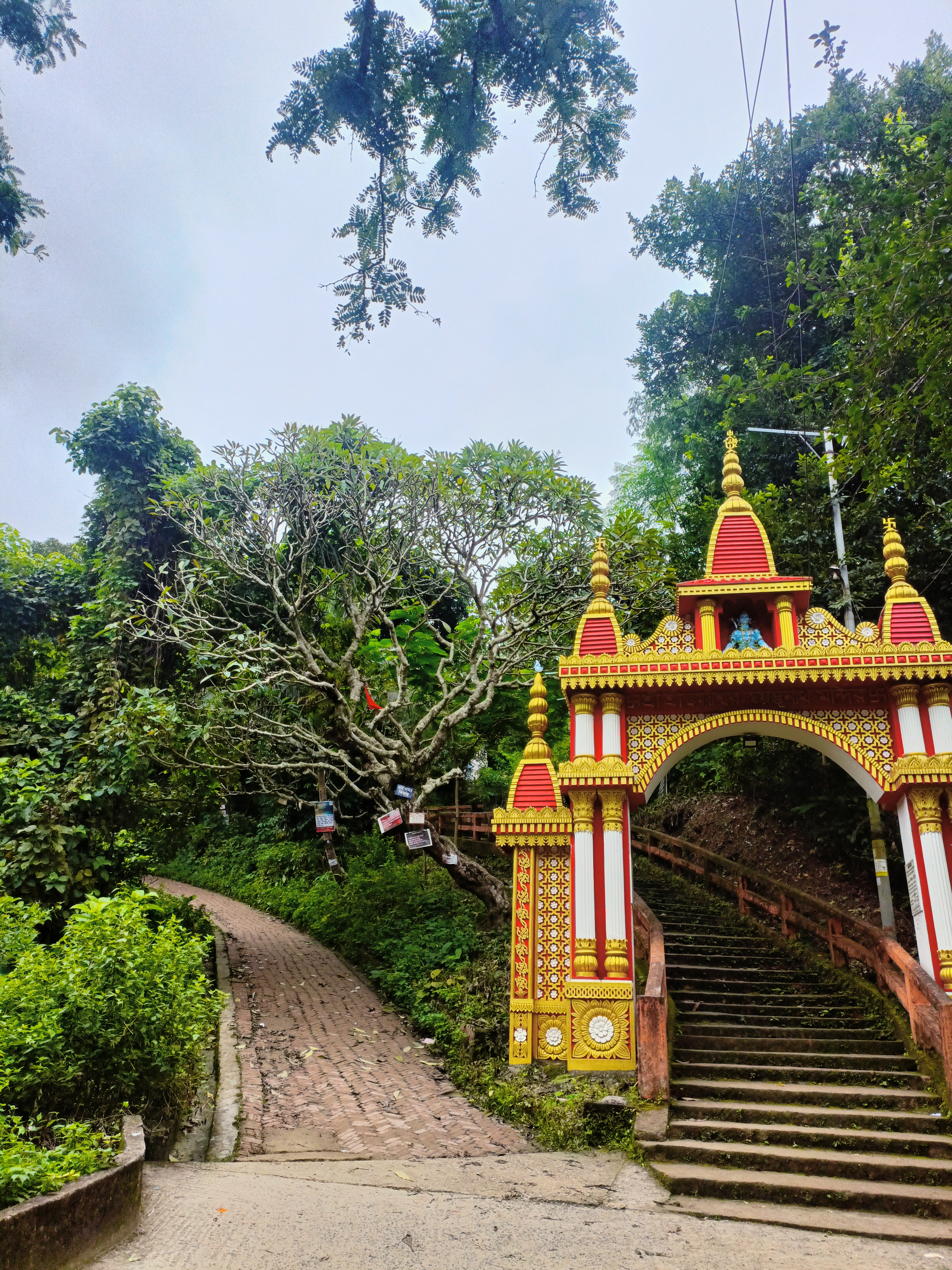
The main entrances at the bottom of the Chandranath Hill. The path on left is for tourists and hikers.

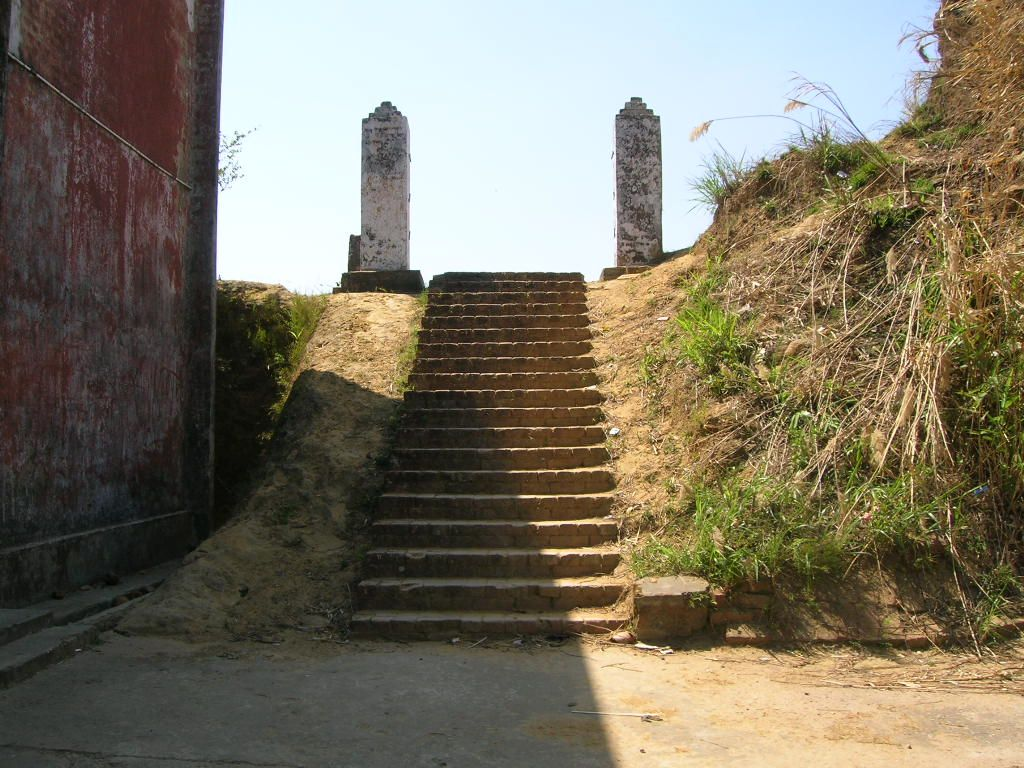
The temple gate of Chandranath Temple in 2008

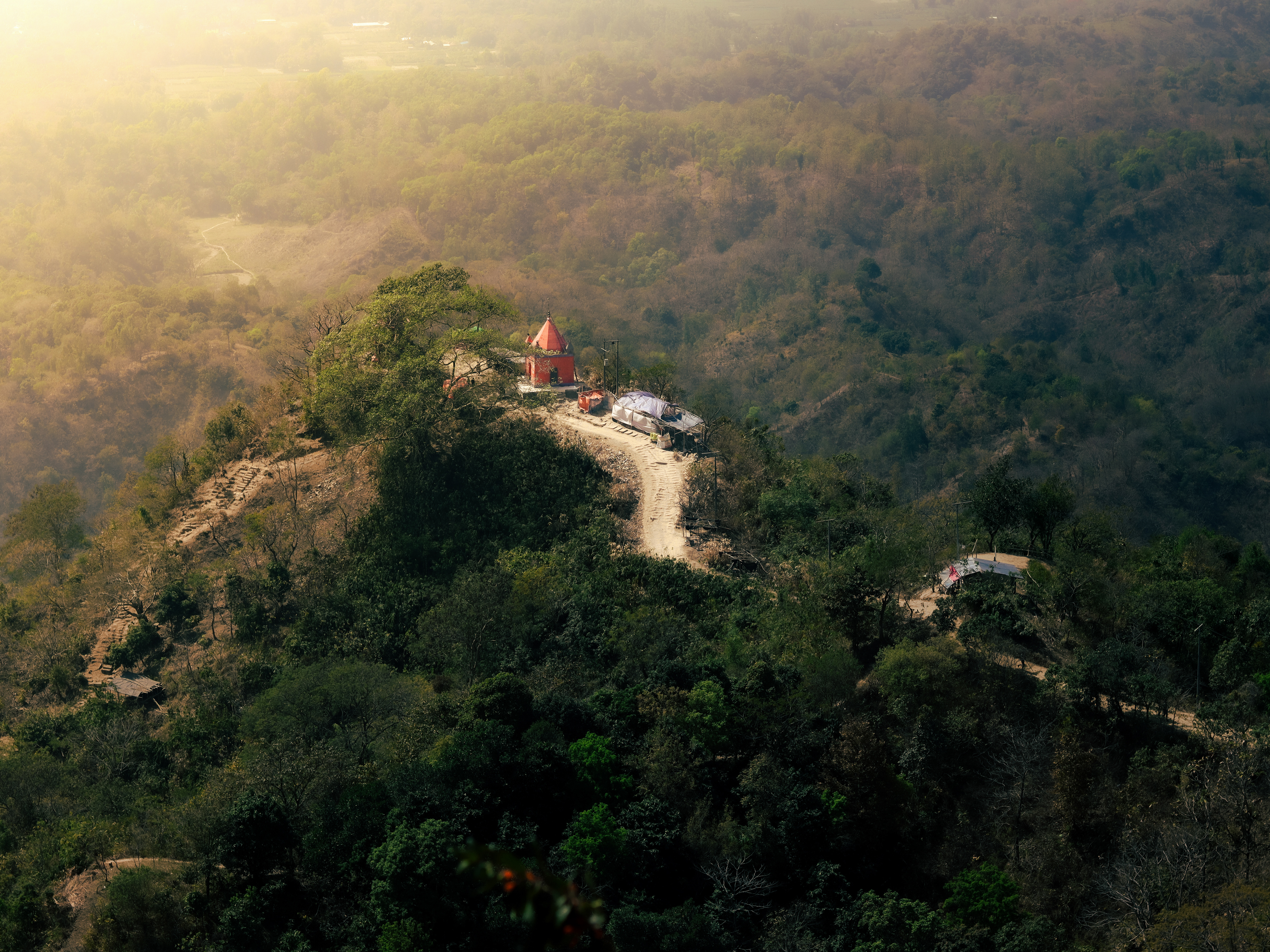
Birupaksha Temple, as seen from the summit of Chittagong's Chandranath Hill

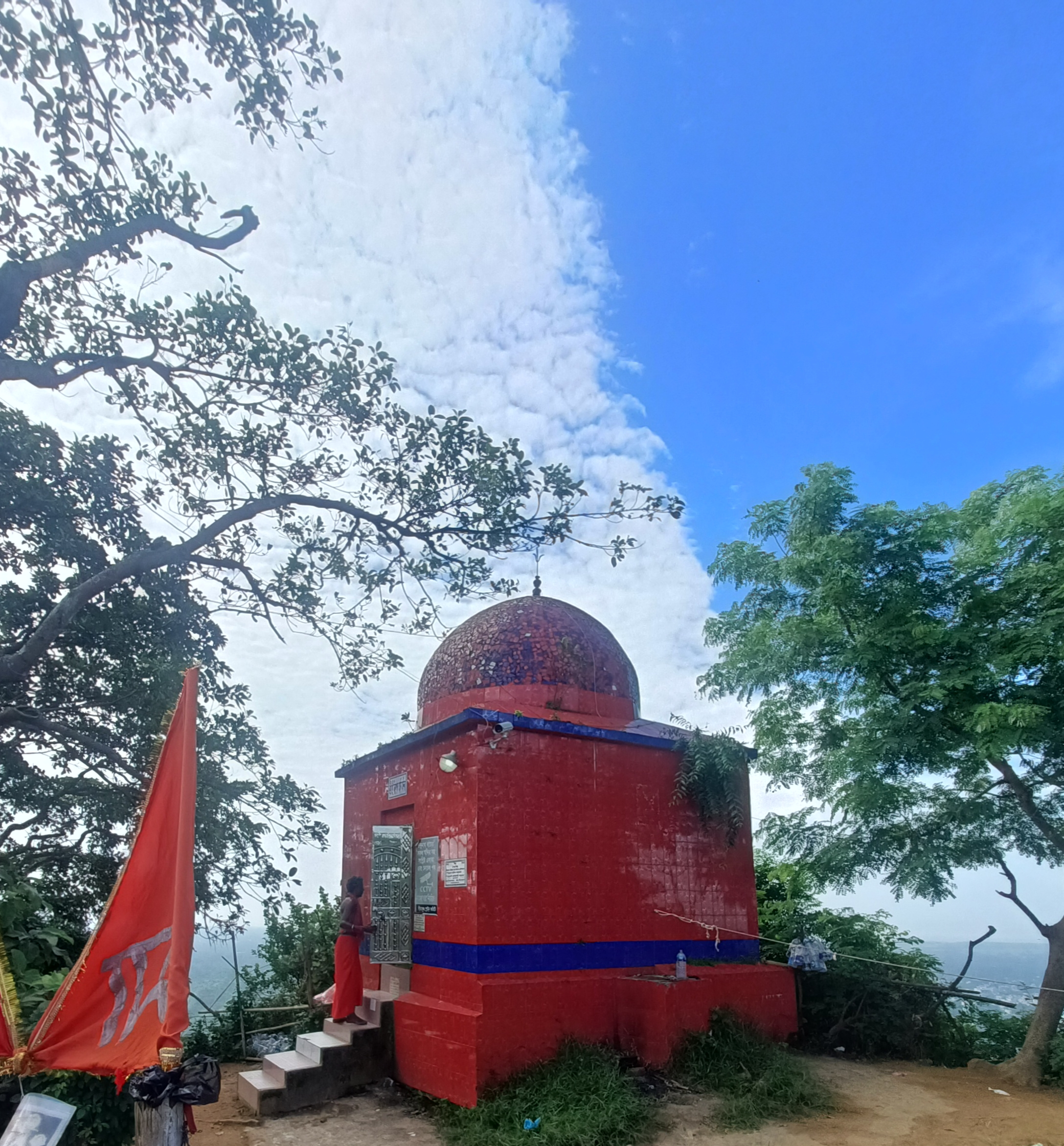
Birupaksha Temple situated below the Chandranath Template
