= Botanical Garden and Eco-Park, Sitakunda =

Park in Bangladesh

Sitakunda Botanical Garden and Eco Park
- Sitakunda Eco Park
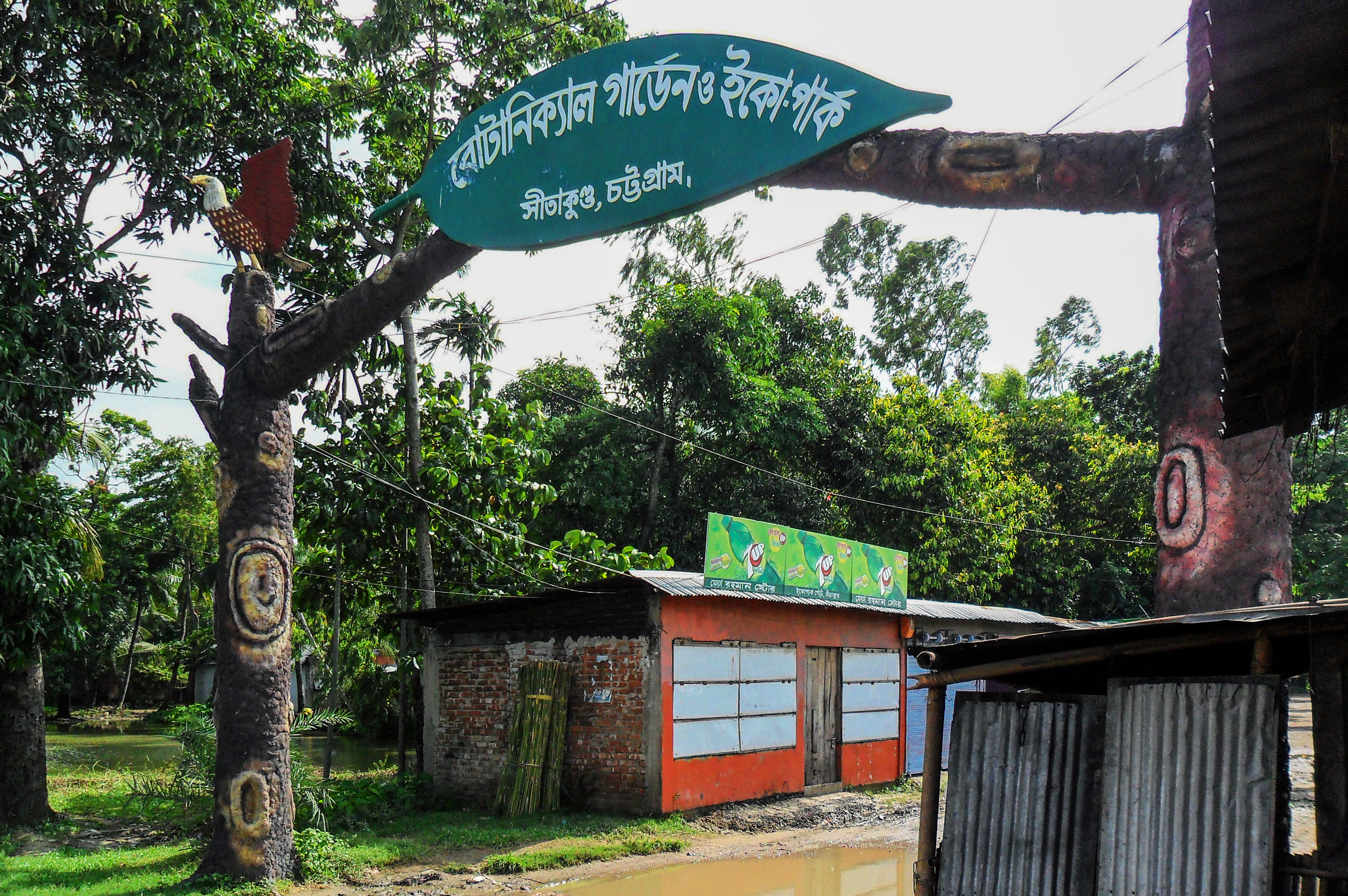
- Entrance

- Location within Bangladesh
- Interactive map of Sitakunda Botanical Garden and Eco Park
- Type: Urban park
- Location: Muradpur, Sitakunda, Chittagong, Bangladesh
- Coordinates: 22.6016°N 91.6715°E
- Area: 996 acres (403 ha)
- Established: 2001
- Open: 10:00-20:00
- Status: open all year
- Public transit: Muradpur Bus Stop

Sitakunda Botanical Garden and Eco Park is a park located in Sitakunda Upazila of Chittagong District in south-eastern Bangladesh.

== History ==
This is the first eco-park in Bangladesh. It was established in 2001 on 808 hectares. The main purposes of creating such eco parks is conservation of biodiversity.

== Area and location ==
The Sitakunda Botanical Garden and Eco Park is located along the Dhaka–Chittagong Highway in Sitakunda Upazila, Sitakunda, Chittagong. The area of the eco Park is about 996 acres (403 ha) which is established at forest side of Chandranath Hills of Sitakunda.

== Key attractions ==
The Sohosdhara Jhorna, a waterfall, is a popular attraction there for locals and people who travel there.

Thematic areas	Details
Lake Front	Spine of the Eco Park, pine-tree lined pathway.
Tropical Tree Garden	As the name suggests, this zone caters specifically to tropical trees.
Wild	There are deer, bears, monkeys and birds such as doyel, parrots, swallows, herons and sparrows. Monkeys move always among the bamboo and some large trees.
Wild Flower Meadow and Formal Garden	A flower lover's zone, these two areas will have varieties of both garden and wild flowers to enjoy.
Fruits Garden	A thematic zone dedicated to fruits
Food Court	There are about twenty food courts for refreshment in front of the park entrance.

== Facilities ==
Presently there are parking lots for Eco Park. Toilet facilities are available for free in three locations. There is a plant nursery selling Bangladeshi and foreign plants.

== Gallery ==
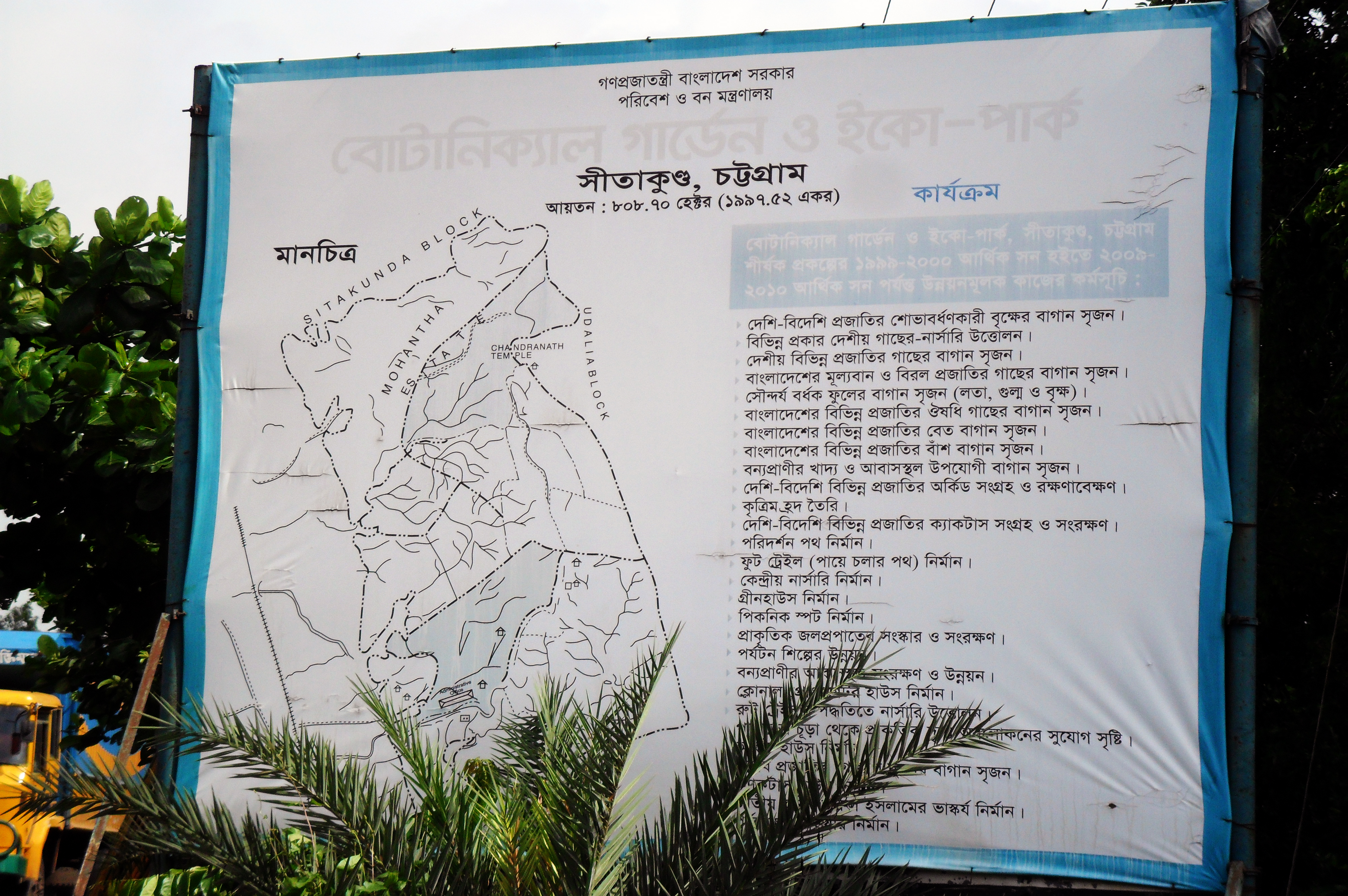
Entrance

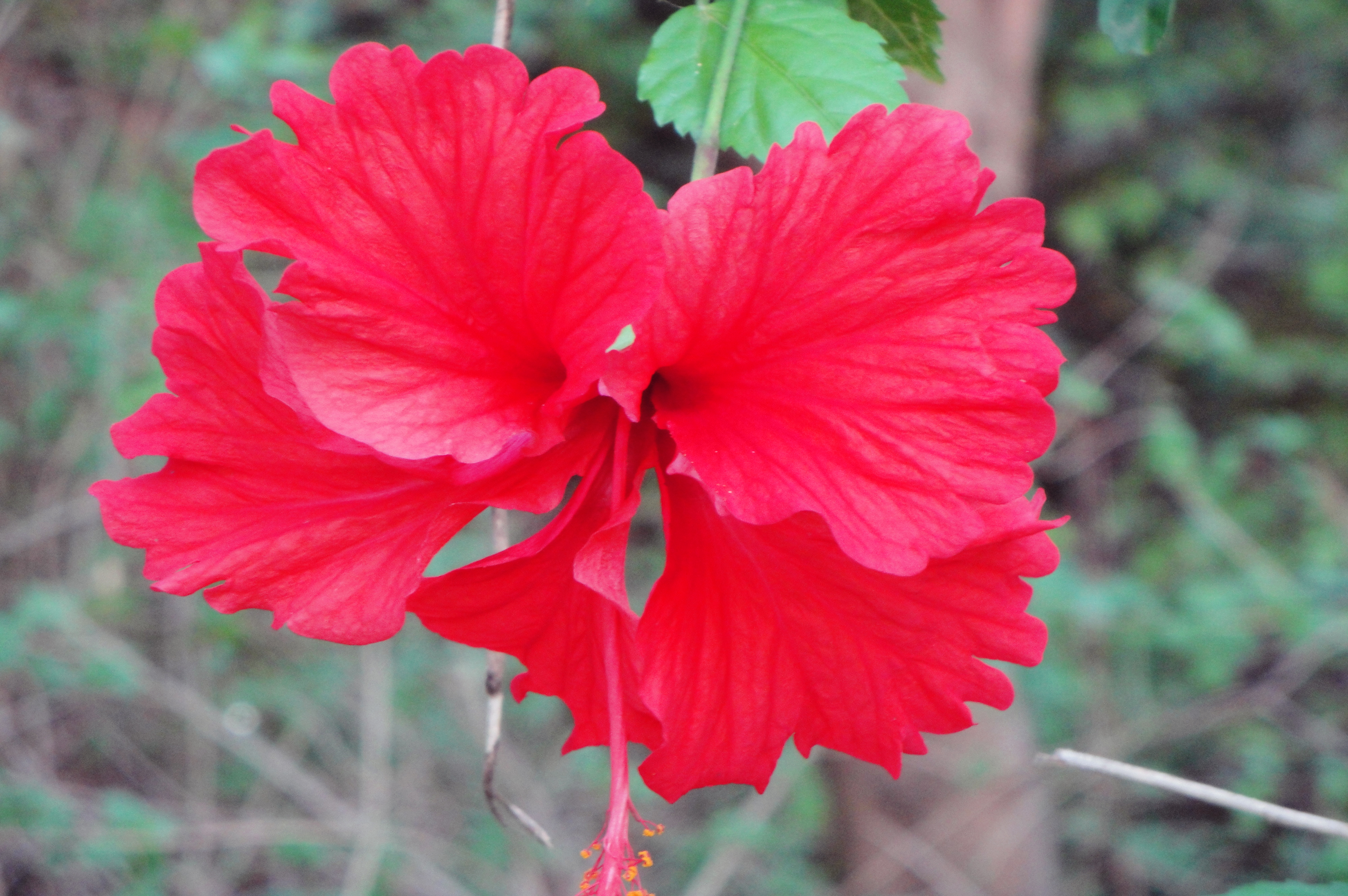
Hibiscus rosa-sinensis is one of the commons flower

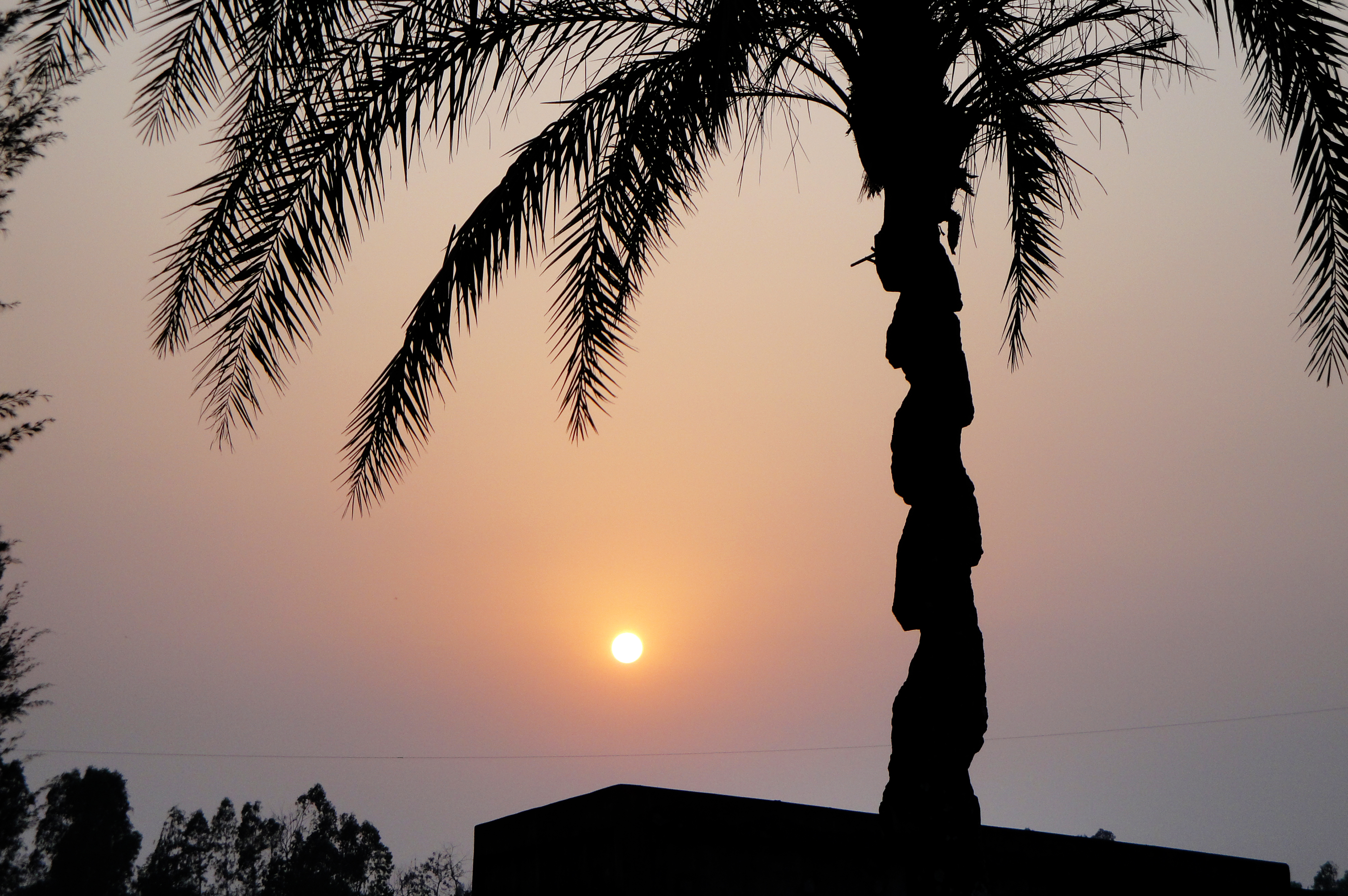
Sunset

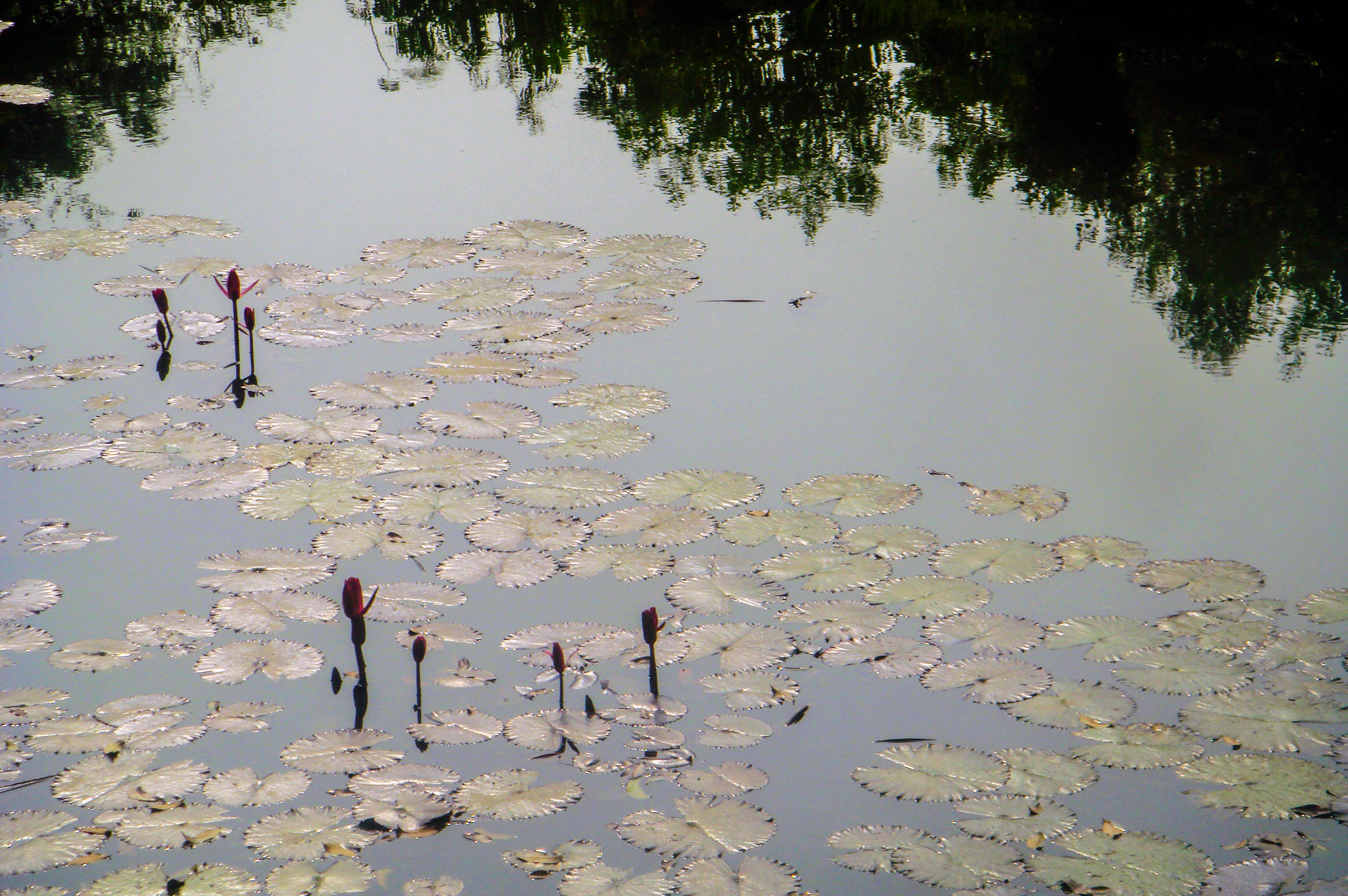
Water lily Pond

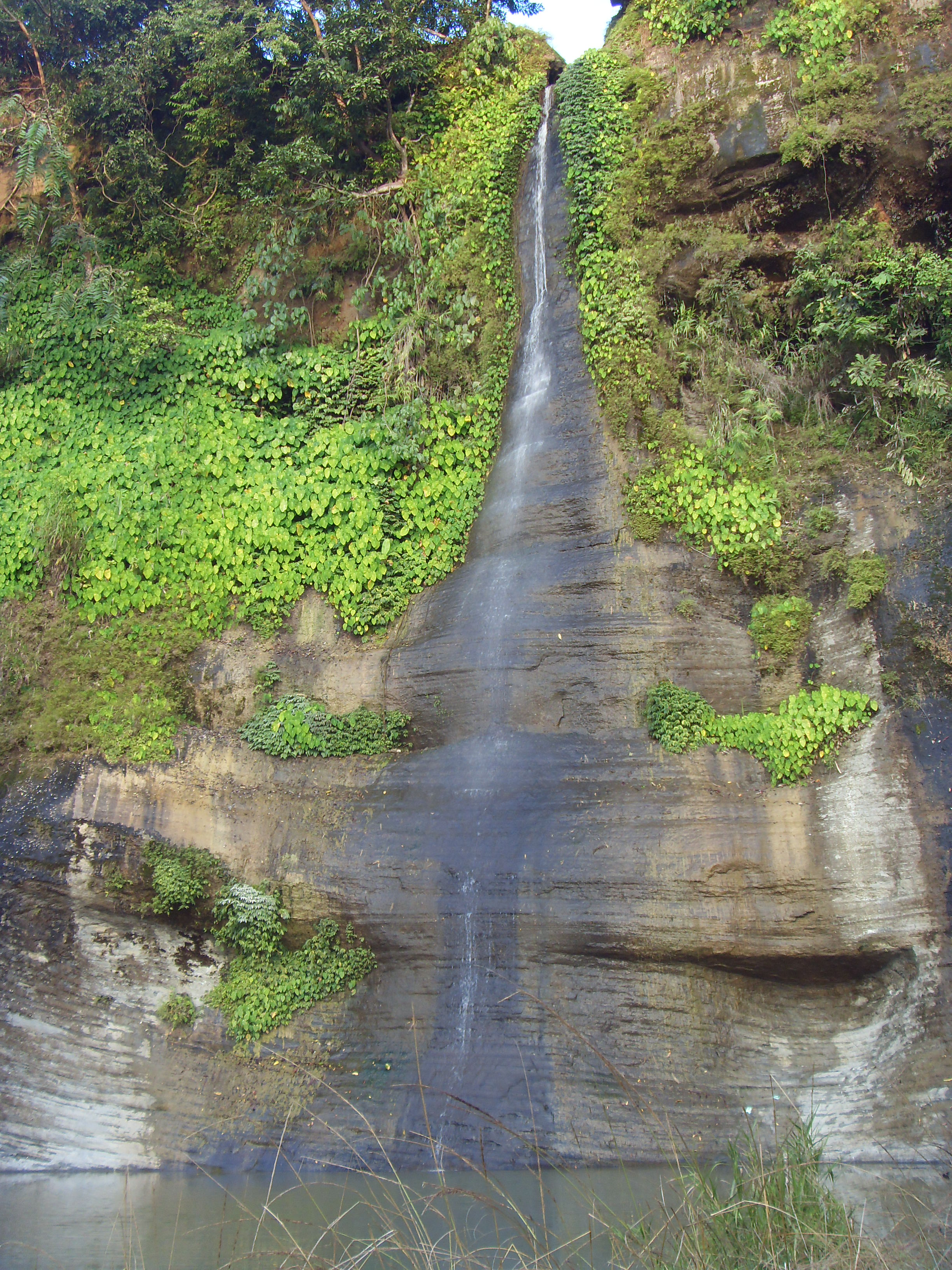
Shahasradhara Waterfall

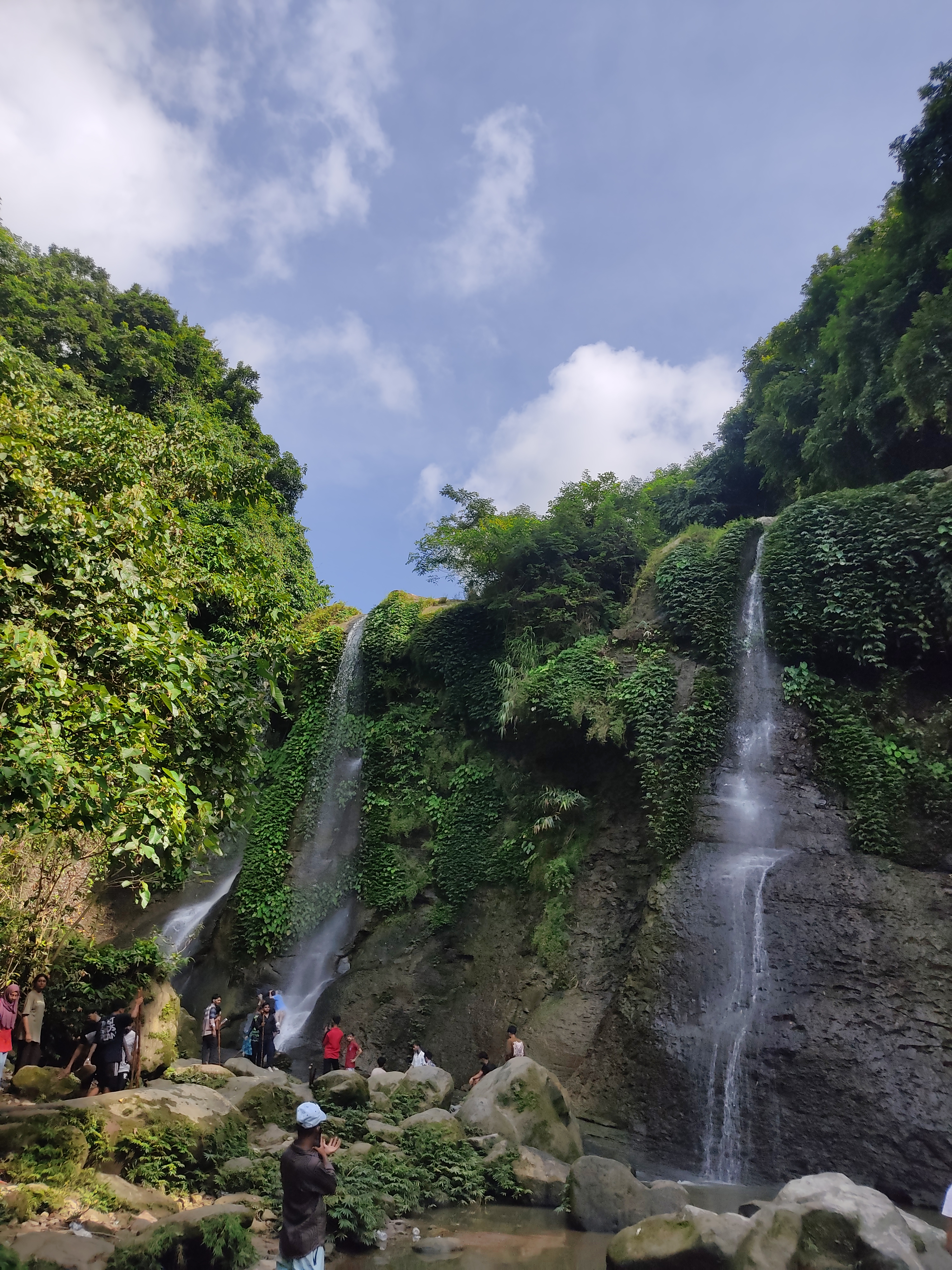
Suptadhara Waterfall
