= Shahasradhara Waterfall =

Waterfall in Bangladesh

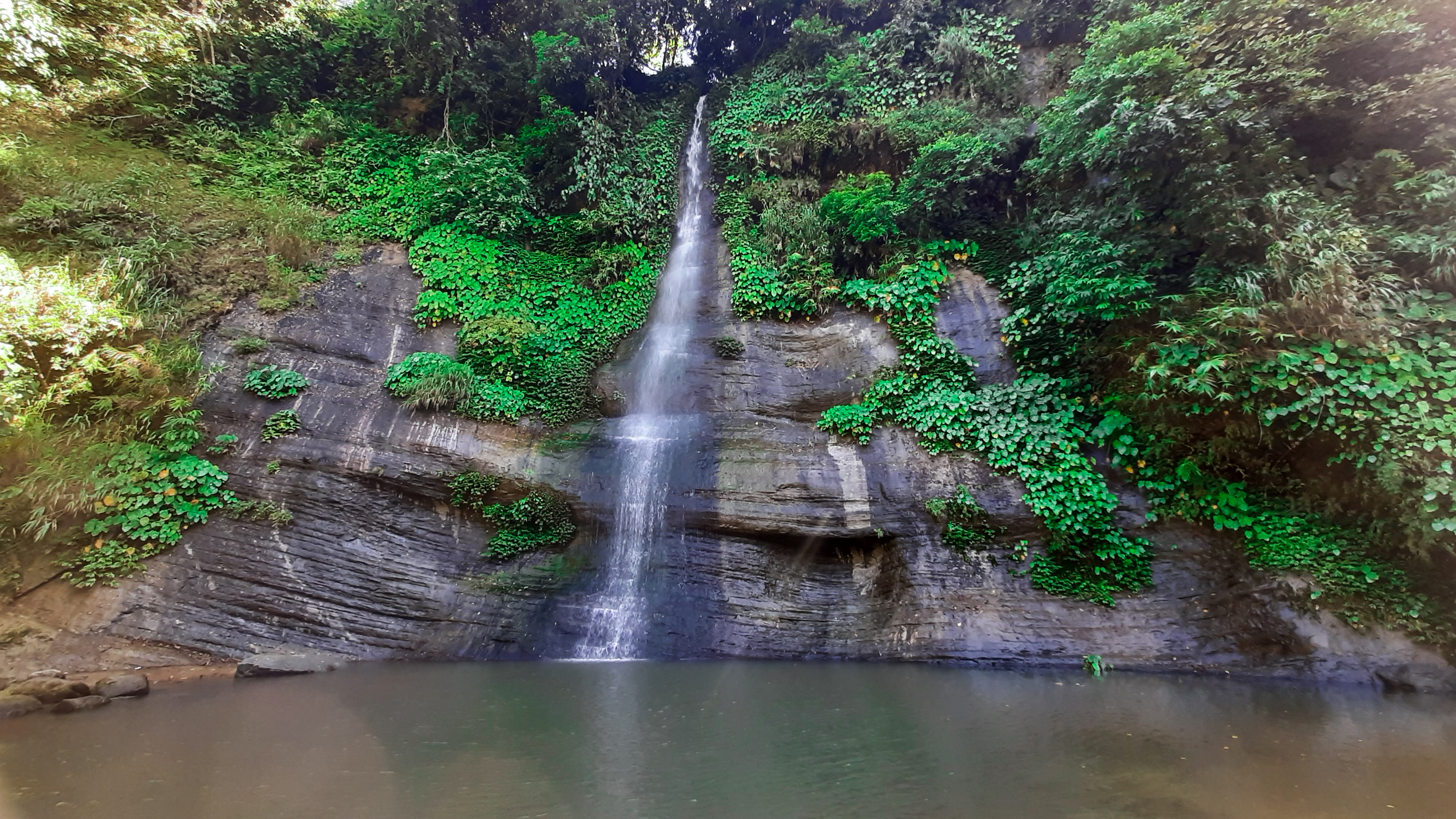
- Shahasradhara Waterfall
- Location: Sitakunda, Chittagong, Bangladesh

Shahasradhara Waterfall Located in Sitakunda Upazila of Chittagong District of Bangladesh. The waterfall has two varrient Shahasradhara-1 and Shahasradhara-2.

== Descriptions ==
Shahasradhara-1 Waterfall is located in the evergreen forest of Chandranath Reserve Forest block of Sitakunda Upazila of Chittagong. The eco-park is 35 km from Chittagong city. Located on the east side of Dhaka-Chittagong highway and railway in the north. During the year other than the monsoon, this fountain is less water. The fountain is found five kilometers away from the main gate of ecopark, with a brick path. There is also another spring called Suptadhara Waterfall near the fountain.

Shahasradhara-2 is located in Komoldah, Mirsarai. It is also known as Komoldah Waterfall.

== See also ==
- Khoiyachora Waterfall
