= Suptadhara Waterfall =

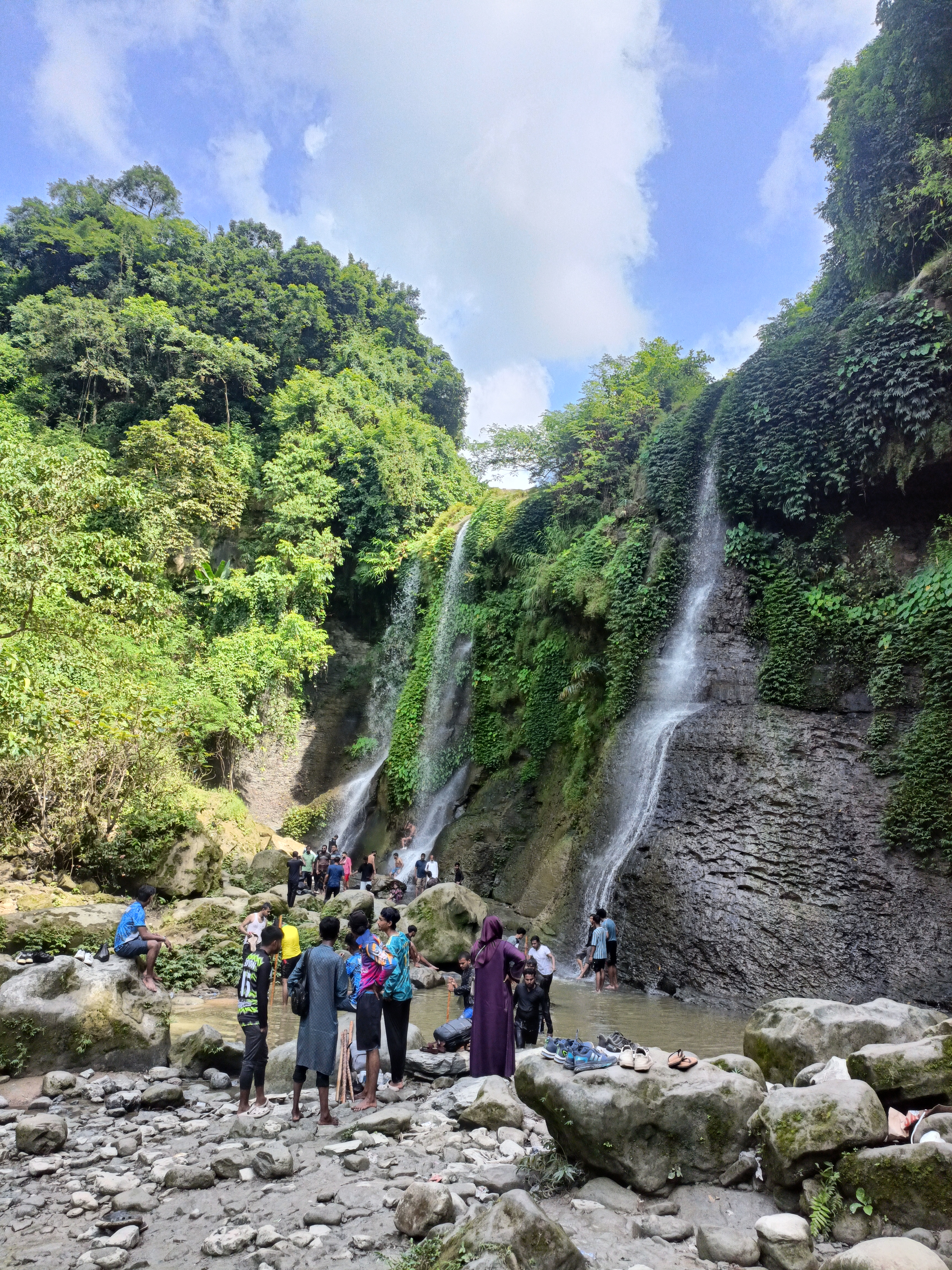
- Suptodhara Waterfall
- Location: Sitakunda, Chittagong, Bangladesh

Suptadhara Waterfall is located in Sitakunda Upazila of Chittagong District, Bangladesh. It is known locally as the "Sleeping Waterfall".

== Etymology ==
Suptadhara gets its name from its distinct seasonal nature—it remains largely dormant and quiet during the dry winter months, only to transform into a roaring, majestic force of nature during the monsoon.

== Description ==
The waterfall is situated in the evergreen forest area of the Chandranath Reserve Forest Block within the Sitakunda Eco Park. The eco-park is located 35 km north of Chittagong city, on the eastern side of the Dhaka–Chittagong highway and railway. Very close to this waterfall lies another one called Shahasradhara Waterfall.

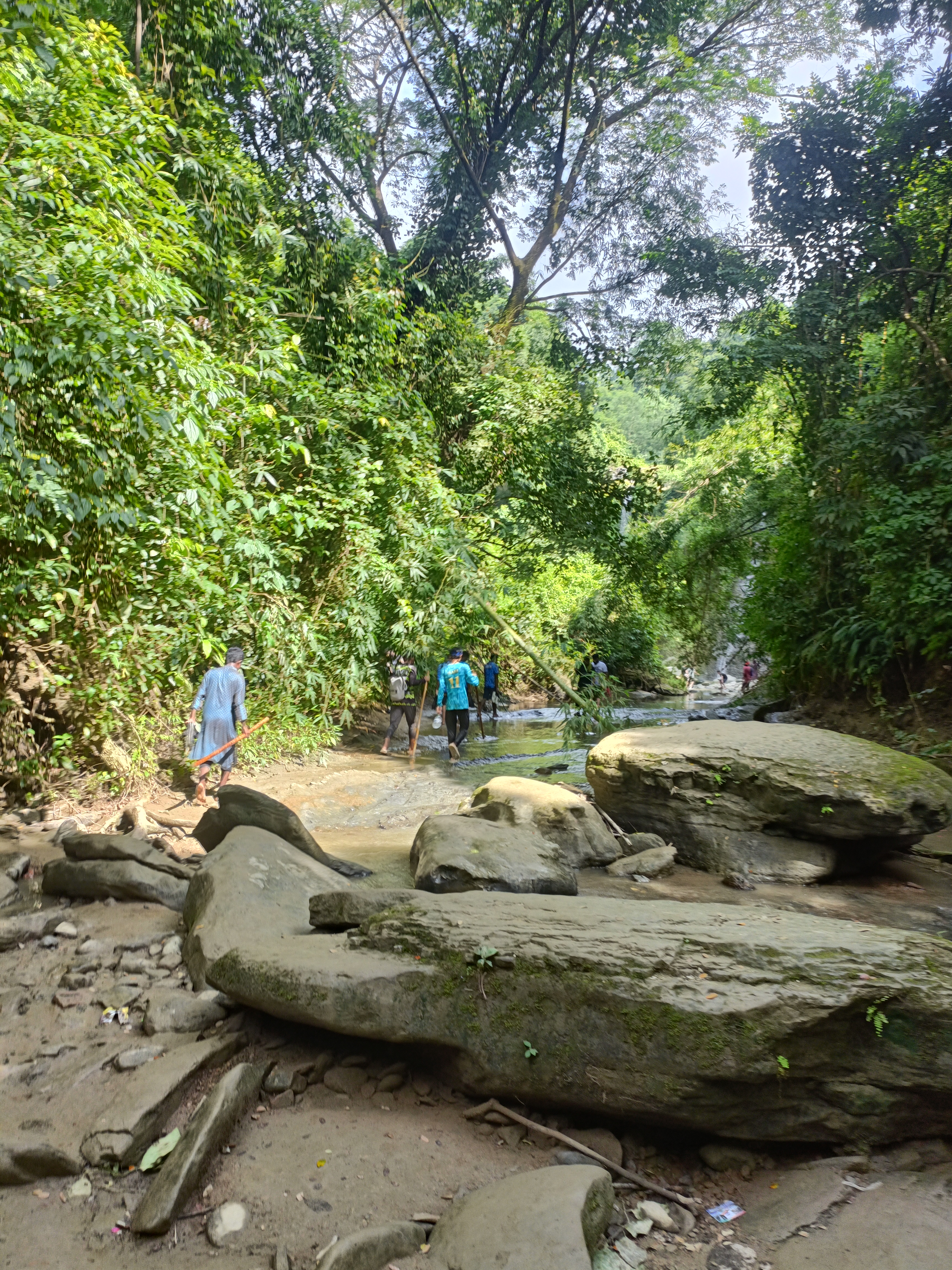
Entrance to the waterfall

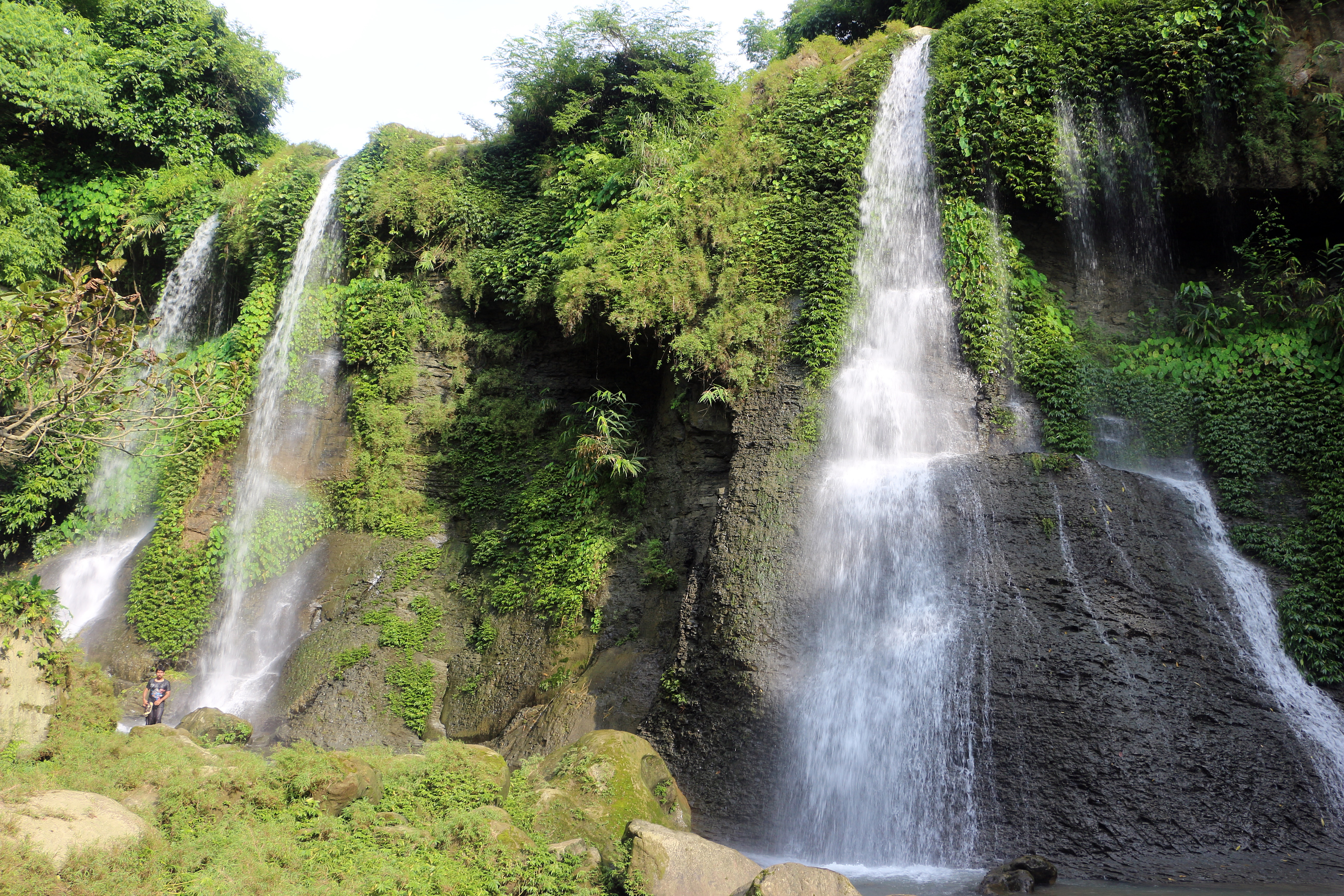
The Suptadhara Waterfall in August 2016

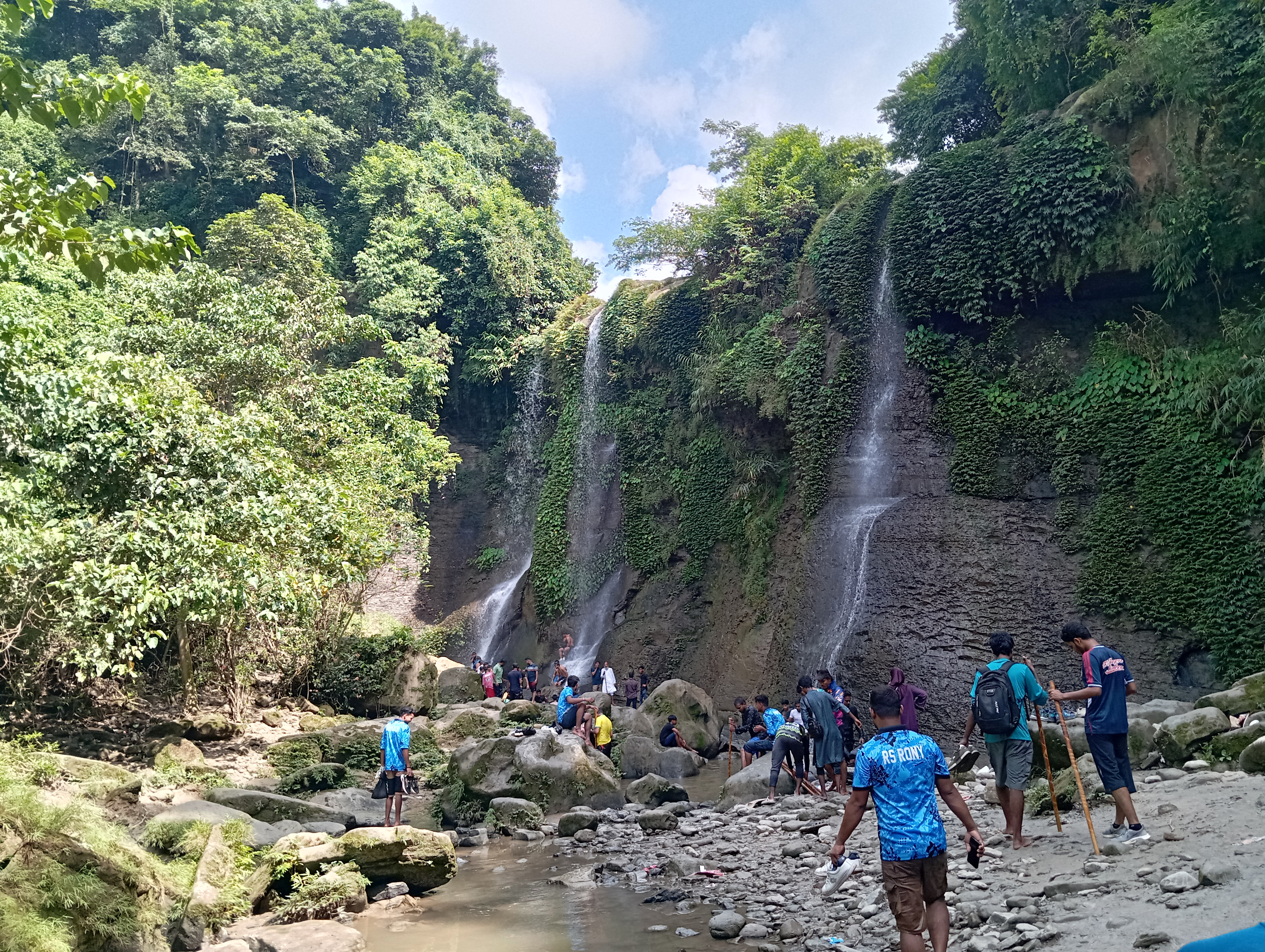
The waterfall during rush hours

== See also ==
- List of waterfalls in Bangladesh
