= Conflict in Rakhine State (2016–present) =

Armed conflict in western Myanmar

- Part of the Myanmar conflict and the Rohingya conflict
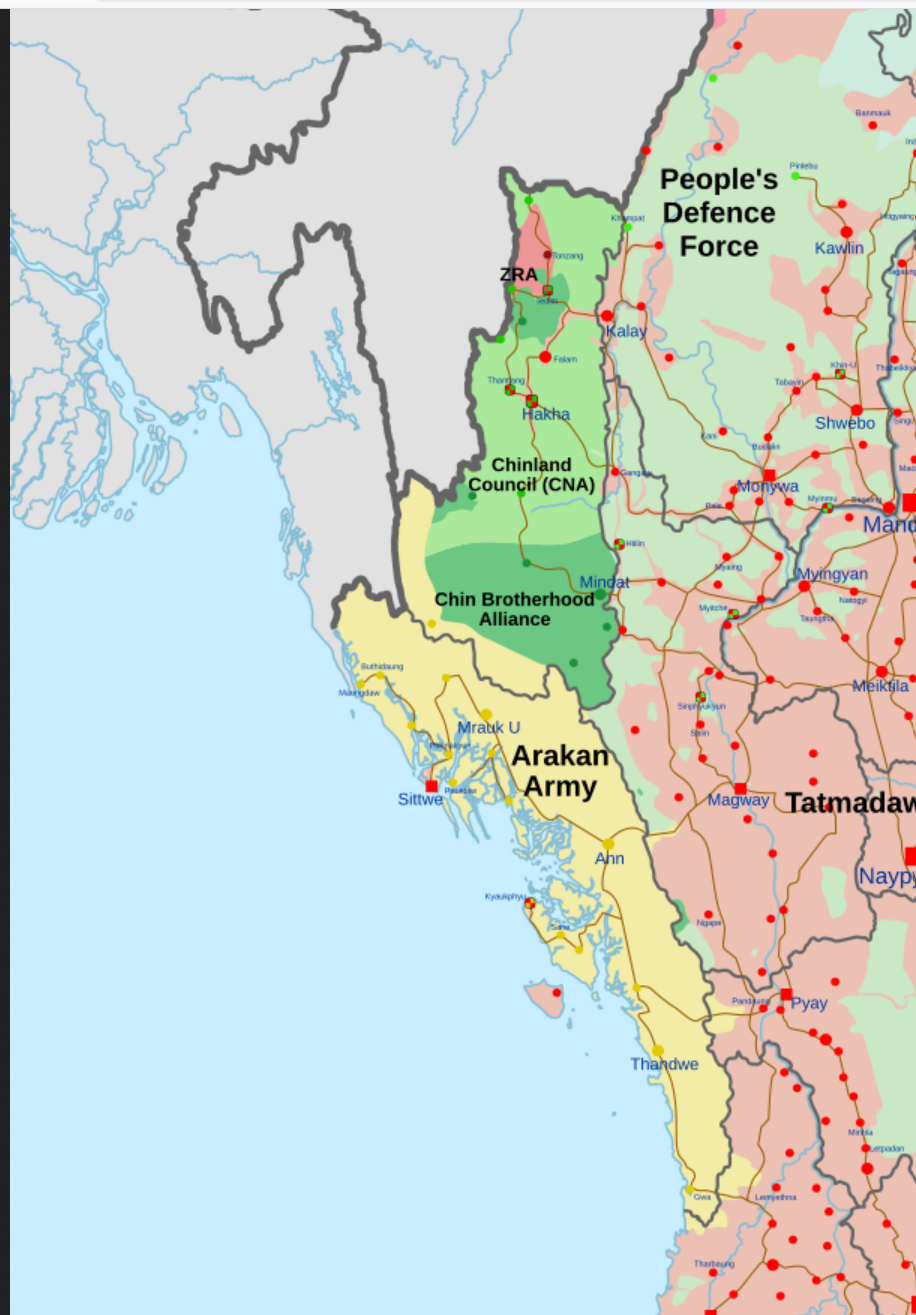
- Map of territorial gains made by the Arakan Army since 2023
Date	9 October 2016 – present (10 years, 1 month, 1 week and 5 days)
Location	Rakhine State; Spillovers: Chin State, Magway Region Ayeyarwady Region, Bago Region and Bangladesh-Myanmar border
Status	Ongoing: Operation 1027; Rakhine offensive

Belligerents
Myanmar; Allied groups: Arakan Liberation Army	Arakan Army; People's Defence Force (from 2021); Support: Three Brotherhood Alliance	Arakan Rohingya Army; Arakan Rohingya Salvation Army; Rohingya Islami Mahaz; Rohingya Solidarity Organisation

Commanders and leaders
Min Aung Hlaing; Soe Tint Naing; Htin Latt Oo; Thurein Tun (POW); Kyaw Myo Aung †; Han Ling Aung †; Aung Myat Moe; Former: Maung Maung Soe (until 2017); Sein Lwin (until 2017); Sein Win (until 2021); Khaing Soe Mya X	Twan Mrat Naing; Nyo Twan Awng	Ataullah abu Ammar Jununi (POW); Abdullah Kane; Nabi Hossain; Mohammed Ayyub Khan; Ko Ko Linn

Units involved
Myanmar Army; 33rd Light Infantry Division; 99th Light Infantry Division; Myanmar Air Force; Myanmar Navy; Myanmar Police Force; Border Guard Police	Arakan Army Auxiliaries	Unknown

Strength
15,000–20,000 soldiers ~1,000 policemen	45,000 soldiers	ARSA: 5,000 (in 2025); RSO: 3,000–5,000 (in 2024); Islami Mahaz: 1,000 (in 2025); ARA: ~30 (in 2024)

Violent clashes have been ongoing in the northern part of Myanmar's Rakhine State since October 2016. Insurgent attacks by the Arakan Rohingya Salvation Army (ARSA) have led to sectarian violence perpetrated by Myanmar's military and the local Buddhist population against predominantly Muslim Rohingya civilians. The conflict has sparked international outcry and was described as an ethnic cleansing by the United Nations High Commissioner for Human Rights. In August 2017, the situation worsened and hundreds of thousands of refugees fled Myanmar into Bangladesh, with an estimated 500,000 refugees having arrived by 27 September 2017. In January 2019, Arakan Army insurgents raided border police posts in Buthidaung Township, joining the conflict and beginning their military campaign in northern Rakhine State against the Burmese military.

The current conflict began on 9 October 2016 when ARSA insurgents attacked Burmese border posts along the Bangladesh–Myanmar border. In response, Burmese authorities launched "clearance operations" between October 2016 and June 2017, which killed more than 1,000 Rohingya civilians, according to UN officials. Following attacks on military outposts by ARSA on 25 August 2017, sectarian violence erupted once again in northern Rakhine State. The Burmese military later claimed that 400 insurgents had died in the clashes that followed. However, the UN estimates that at least 1,000 people were killed between 25 August and 8 September. By September, the violence had resulted in 389,000 Rohingyas fleeing their homes.

A report published on 27 June 2018 by Amnesty International detailed crimes against humanity perpetrated by Burmese military units both before and after 25 August 2017 ARSA attacks.

By February 2025, the ongoing Rakhine offensive launched by Arakan Army gained control of over 90% of Rakhine State, including 14 of its 17 townships.

== Background ==
After Myanmar gained independence in 1948, Rakhine and Rohingya nationalists both struggled to secure autonomy, as successive central governments continued to suppress their demands. In 2011 Myanmar's political reforms, allowed for greater ethnic expression, but these changes did not translate into real political power for the people. In the 2015 elections, the Arakan National Party (ANP) won a majority of seats in Rakhine State, yet the central government bypassed them and appointed a chief minister from the ruling party. This move reinforced the belief among many Rakhine that electoral politics could not secure their rights, pushing some toward armed struggle.

Amid these frustrations, the Arakan Army (AA), an armed group advocating for greater autonomy, gained popularity among the region. Founded in 2009, the AA positioned itself as the defender of Rakhine interests, leading to frequent clashes with the Burmese military, especially from 2015 onward. The military responded with brutal crackdowns, including human rights violations, which fueled further resentment and resistance among the Rakhine population.

In response to persistent oppression, Rohingya insurgent groups have formed over the years. Notably, the Arakan Rohingya Salvation Army (ARSA) emerged, claiming to defend Rohingya rights. ARSA's attacks on Myanmar security forces in 2016 and 2017 prompted brutal military crackdowns, resulting in mass atrocities against Rohingya civilians and the displacement of hundreds of thousands to neighboring Bangladesh. Other notable Rohingya insurgent groups include Arakan Rohingya Army, Rohingya Solidarity Organisation, and Rohingya Islami Mahaz.

In modern times, the persecution of Rohingyas in Myanmar dates back to the 1970s. Since then, Rohingya people have regularly been made the target of persecution by the government and nationalist Buddhists. The tension between various religious groups in the country had often been exploited by the past military governments of Myanmar. According to Amnesty International, the Rohingya have suffered from human rights violations under past military dictatorships since 1978, and many have fled to neighbouring Bangladesh as a result. In 2005, the United Nations High Commissioner for Refugees had assisted with the repatriation of Rohingyas from Bangladesh, but allegations of human rights abuses in the refugee camps threatened this effort. In 2015, 140,000 Rohingyas remained in IDP camps after communal riots in 2012.

== Rohingya insurgency ==
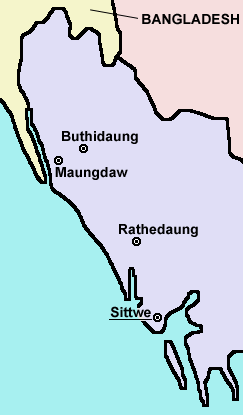
Northern Rakhine State settlements

=== 2016–2017 clashes ===
==== 2016 ====
On 9 October, hundreds of unidentified insurgents attacked three Burmese border posts along Myanmar's border with Bangladesh. According to government officials in the majority Rohingya border town of Maungdaw, the attackers brandished knives, machetes and homemade slingshots that fired metal bolts. Nine border officers were killed in the attack, and 48 guns, 6,624 bullets, 47 bayonets and 164 bullet cartridges were looted by the insurgents. Four Burmese soldiers were also killed two days later. Government officials in Rakhine State initially blamed the Rohingya Solidarity Organisation (RSO), an Islamist insurgent group which was mainly active in the 1980s and 1990s, for the attacks, but a group calling itself Harakah al-Yaqin ("Faith Movement") later claimed responsibility.

Following the attacks in October, the Myanmar Army began "clearance operations"—widely seen as a military crackdown on the Rohingya—in the villages of northern Rakhine State. In the initial operation, dozens of people were killed and many were arrested. The military enforced a curfew and blocked food aid from the World Food Programme to 80,000 people in Rakhine State. As the crackdown continued, the casualties increased. Arbitrary arrest, extrajudicial killings, gang rapes and looting were reportedly carried out by the military. Hundreds of Rohingya people had been killed by December 2016, and many had fled Myanmar as refugees to take shelter in the nearby areas of Bangladesh.

The chief of police in Rakhine State, Colonel Sein Lwin, announced on 2 November that his force had begun recruiting non-Rohingya locals for a new branch of "regional police", which would be trained in Sittwe, the capital of Rakhine State, and then sent back to their villages. The stated purpose of these forces was to defend villages against Rohingya insurgents; however, human rights organisations criticised the move, saying the new branch would likely to be used to further the persecution of Rohingya civilians.

New clashes began on 13 November, resulting in the deaths of one policeman, one soldier and six insurgents. Burmese police later arrested 36 suspected insurgents in connection to the attacks. Fighting continued and on the third day of the fighting, the death toll rose to 134 (102 insurgents and 32 security forces). The government later announced that 234 people suspected of being linked to the attackers had been arrested. Some of those arrested were later sentenced to death for their suspected involvement in the attack.

==== 2017 ====
Clashes between insurgents and the military continued in 2017. Burmese state media reported on 22 June that three insurgents had been killed by security forces during a two-day raid on an insurgent camp supposedly belonging to Harakah al-Yaqin, now calling themselves the Arakan Rohingya Salvation Army (ARSA). Authorities confiscated gunpowder, ski masks and wooden rifles suspected to have been used for training.

In February, the United Nations accused Myanmar's military of mass killings and gang rapes, as well as burning down villages over the course of their "clearance operations". It stated that the military's operations had "likely caused hundreds of deaths." Two senior UN officials working in its two separate agencies in Bangladesh stated that more than 1,000 may have died per testimonies gathered from Rohingyas. Meanwhile, Myanmar's presidential spokesman, Zaw Htay said that per latest reports from military commanders, fewer than 100 people had been killed. The government of Myanmar denied that there was a systematic campaign of rape, though acknowledges it may have been committed by "individual members of the security forces".

A police document obtained by Reuters in March listed 423 Rohingyas detained by the police since 9 October 2016, 13 of whom were children, the youngest being ten years old. Two police captains in Maungdaw verified the document and justified the arrests, with one of them saying, "We the police have to arrest those who collaborated with the attackers, children or not, but the court will decide if they are guilty; we are not the ones who decide." Myanmar police also claimed that the children had confessed to their alleged crimes during interrogations, and that they were not beaten or pressured during questioning. The average age of those detained is 34, the youngest is 10, and the oldest is 75.

In April the Myanmar Army deployed an additional 1,000 soldiers to Rakhine State, increasing the number of active troops in the region to 2,000.

Rakhine State police chief Sein Lwin announced on 27 June that security forces were on "high alert" after "masked assailants" killed several local administrators close to the Burmese government in the days prior. A week later on 4 July, a mob of at least a hundred Rakhine Buddhists in Sittwe attacked seven Rohingya men from Dapaing camp for internally displaced persons with bricks, killing one and severely injuring another. The Rohingya men were being escorted by police to Sittwe's docks to purchase boats, but were attacked despite armed guards being present nearby. According to a spokesman for the Burmese Ministry of Home Affairs, an unarmed junior policeman was with the Rohingya men at the time of the attack, but was unable to stop the attackers. One man was arrested in relation to the attacks on 26 July.

Bodies of slain locals have been discovered over the course of the conflict; the government has stated that they were victims of Rohingya insurgents. The bodies of three Rohingya locals who had worked closely with the local administration were found in shallow graves in Maungdaw on 21 January. The government suspected that they were murdered by Rohingya insurgents in a reprisal attack. Three decapitated bodies were found in Rathedaung Township on 31 July. According to a government official, they were murdered by Rohingya insurgents. The bodies of six ethnic Mro farmers, reportedly killed by Rohingya insurgents, were found in Maungdaw Township on 3 August.

In mid-August 2017, Bangladesh security forces had stepped up its border patrols, following reports of 1,100 Rohingya migrating into Bangladesh in the past two weeks amid fresh tensions in Rakhine state. After the October 2016 clashes in Myanmar, the refugee flow had slowed until hundreds more soldiers were deployed recently.

==== 25 August 2017 attacks ====
The government announced on 25 August that 71 people (one soldier, one immigration officer, 10 policemen and 59 insurgents) had been killed overnight during coordinated attacks by up to 150 insurgents on 24 police posts and the 552nd Light Infantry Battalion army base in Rakhine State. The Myanmar Army stated that the attack began at around 1:00 am, when insurgents armed with bombs, light weapons and machetes blew up a bridge. The army further stated that a majority of the attacks occurred around 3:00 am to 4:00 am.

ARSA claimed they were taking "defensive actions" in 25 different locations and accused government soldiers of raping and killing civilians. The group also claimed that Rathedaung had been under a blockade for more than two weeks, starving the Rohingya, and that the government forces were preparing to do the same in Maungdaw.

Myanmar's civilian leader, Aung San Suu Kyi, sharply criticised the insurgent Rohingya attacks as an attempt to undermine others' efforts to "build peace and harmony in Rakhine state." The United Nations condemned the attacks, while calling on all sides to refrain from violence.

==== Military crackdown operations and violence ====
Following attacks by ARSA on 25 August, Myanmar's armed forces led a crackdown against Rohingyas in Rakhine State. The military referred to the action as "clearance operations", but critics argued that the targets were Rohingya civilians and that it was an attempt to drive the Rohingya out of Myanmar.

On 26 August, Myanmar troops allegedly opened fire on Rohingya civilians as they attempted to escape into Bangladesh.

The violence resulted in the deaths of hundreds of people in Myanmar's Rakhine state. At least 1,000 have been killed by 7 September, according to Yanghee Lee, the United Nations Special Rapporteur on Human Rights for Myanmar. She added that the figure is "very likely an underestimate". On the same day, Myanmar's armed forces claimed that 400 insurgents had been killed. However, Rohingya accounts indicate that most of the dead were non-combatant civilians, including women and children.

Rohingya refugees quickly began fleeing Myanmar by the thousands, then, within two weeks, by the hundreds of thousands. By 12 September, authorities in Bangladesh and aid agencies were reporting 370,000 refugees had fled Myanmar, mostly Rohingya Muslims (about a third of the estimated Rohingya population in Myanmar), but also hundreds of Hindus and Buddhists.

Rohingya refugees arrived in Bangladesh, many of whom had injuries such as bullet wounds, and reported fleeing indiscriminate shootings, rapes, torture and other violent acts against Rohingya civilians by mobs of Buddhist Rakhine civilians and Myanmar government forces, including upon whole villages, many of which were burnt down (reportedly some with villagers, even children, confined in the burning structures by their attackers).

When Human Rights Watch published satellite photos showing villages on fire, the Burmese government acknowledged that Rohingya houses were burned, but again insisted (as they did in 2012) that the Rohingya insurgents were burning their own villages. However, a group of reporters on a government-guided tour claimed they caught Rakhine civilians torching empty Rohingya houses, and one reporter alleged he was told by a Rakhine civilian that the police had assisted them.

The U.N. High Commissioner for Human Rights said the violence appeared to be "a textbook example of 'ethnic cleansing.'"

In late August 2017, Bangladesh proposed joint military operations with Myanmar against ARSA. In September 2017, it accused Myanmar of repeatedly violating its airspace and issued a warning stating that any more "provocative acts" could have "unwarranted consequences". Myanmar spokesman, Zaw Htay, stated Myanmar would check any information Bangladesh provided.

On 2 September, the 33rd Light Infantry Division of the Myanmar Army and local paramilitaries executed ten villagers in Inn Din who were suspected of being ARSA members.

Starting on 6 September, reports emerged that the Myanmar Army had begun laying landmines near the border with Bangladesh. Bangladesh said it had photographic evidence of Myanmar laying mines, and lodged an official complaint. On 10 September, Amnesty International accused Myanmar's security forces of laying landmines in violation of the landmine ban under international law, an accusation Myanmar's government denied. The purpose of Myanmar laying mines is believed to be to prevent the Rohingya refugees from returning. At least three people, including two children, had been injured in landmines as of 10 September. Mro people crossing the border into Myanmar have also been injured by the mines.

==== Ceasefire and aftermath ====
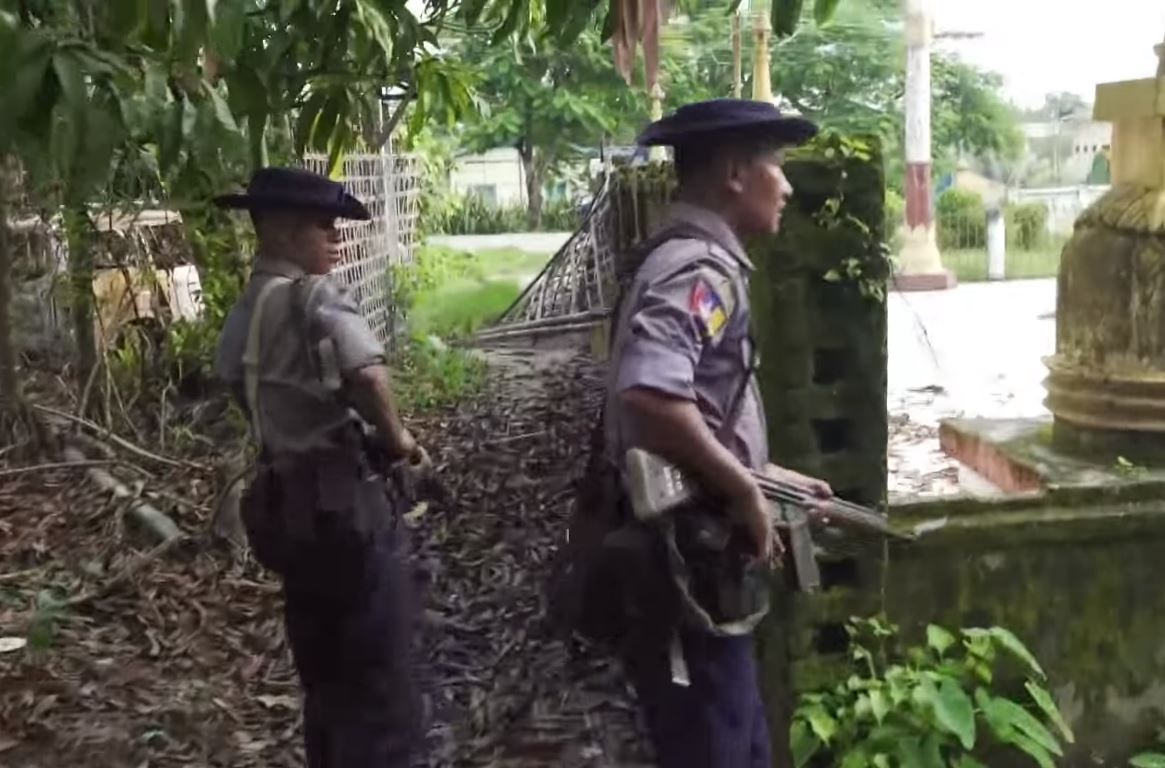
Members of the Myanmar Police Force patrolling in Maungdaw in September 2017.

A one-month unilateral ceasefire was declared by ARSA on 9 September, in an attempt to allow aid groups and humanitarian workers safe access into northern Rakhine State. In a statement, the group urged the government to lay down their arms and agree to their ceasefire, which would have been in effect from 10 September until 9 October (the one-year anniversary of the first attacks on Burmese security forces by ARSA). The government rejected the ceasefire, with Zaw Htay, the spokesperson for the State Counsellor's office, stating, "We have no policy to negotiate with terrorists."

The Myanmar government reported on 17 September that 176 of 471 Rohingya villages had been abandoned. By then it was reported that 430,000 Rohingyas had fled into neighbouring Bangladesh. The government of Bangladesh also announced plans to build shelters for 400,000 refugees and start immunisations, but began restricting the movement of some of the refugees.

United Nations Secretary General António Guterres urged Myanmar State Counsellor Aung San Suu Kyi to use her planned speech to her nation on 19 September to announce a stop to the military offensive, warning that if she did not, "I do not see how this can be reversed in the future". However, U.S. diplomats—while demanding that "this persecution must stop", attempted to be supportive of Suu Kyi's fragile, new civilian-leader position in a nation still largely ruled by the military. Suu Kyi's speech was later criticised by Amnesty International as "a mix of untruths and victim-blaming". Doubt was also cast on her statement of there being no clashes after 5 September, with satellite imagery examined by Amnesty International appearing to show more than a dozen burned villages and fires since then.

Myanmar's vice-president Henry Van Thio told the UN on 20 September that Burmese security forces had been instructed to avoid collateral damage and harm to innocent civilians. He also promised that human rights violations would be dealt with "in accordance with strict norms of justice." Thio added that minority groups other than the Rohingya had also fled the violence and that his government was concerned over Rohingyas fleeing despite there being no armed clashes since 5 September.

Rakhine Chief Minister Nyi Pu and Minister for Social Welfare, Relief and Resettlement Win Myat Aye visited the villages of Nyaung Pin Gyi and Ah Nauk Pyin to deliver aid after reports of Rohingya Muslims being trapped in the latter. An official also stated that those trapped in the villages were guaranteed safe passage by the two ministers, after local Rakhine Buddhists threatened them. Win Myat Aye stated that he had learned of the situation in the villages from international reports and that he and Nyi Pu had assured the Rohingya that they would take action against those intimidating them.

ARSA stated on 7 October that they would respond to any peace initiatives proposed by Myanmar's government, but added that their one-month unilateral ceasefire was about to end. Despite the ceasefire ending on 9 October, the government stated that there were no signs of any new attacks as it held inter-faith prayers in a stadium in Yangon to curb animosity.

Myanmar's military launched an internal probe into the actions of its soldiers during the August clashes. In November, the military released a report denying all accusations against its security forces. Major General Maung Maung Soe was meanwhile transferred from his post as head of Western Command in Rakhine State in the same month.

While welcoming Pope Francis on 28 November during the second day of his visit to Myanmar, Aung San Suu Kyi stated that there had been an "erosion of trust and understanding" between the communities of Rakhine State. The International Committee of the Red Cross stated on 13 December that an estimated 300,000 Rohingya Muslims remained in Rakhine State, 180,000 of whom were displaced in the north. Human Rights Watch stated on 18 December that it had identified 40 Rohingya villages which had been destroyed in October and November.

=== Low-level insurgency (2017–present) ===
==== Late 2017 ====
The state-run Global New Light of Myanmar stated on 17 November that three trucks were extensively damaged in landmine explosions in Minbya two days earlier. It stated they were targeting army convoys, and added that another landmine exploded near a village later in the day as seven military trucks passed by, injuring a pedestrian. It also separately stated that 19 people had been arrested over the August attacks and charged under the anti-terrorism law.

==== 2018 ====
The Tatmadaw estimated the size of ARSA to be around 200 fighters in January 2018.

ARSA claimed responsibility for an ambush carried out on a Burmese military convoy on 5 January in the village of Turaing, claiming they were fighting against "Burmese state-sponsored terrorism" against Rohingyas. Six security personnel and a civilian driver were reportedly wounded by gunfire and homemade land mines.

In mid-March, Burmese authorities began sponsoring the migration of Rakhine Buddhists from Rakhine State's poorer southern regions to areas in the north that were formerly dominated by Rohingya Muslims. The village of Inn Din, which was the site of a mass execution of Rohingyas, had 250 new Rakhine arrivals from the south by 16 March. According to Amnesty International, three facilities were being constructed for the security forces at the time, and Rohingyas were forcibly evicted from their village so that the land could be used for a military base. Four undamaged mosques were also reportedly dismantled. Yanghee Lee stated on 12 March that the government of Myanmar appeared to be deliberately starving the Rohingya to make them flee.

On 27 June, Amnesty International published a report on the situation in Rakhine State, detailing abuses faced by Rohingyas both before and after the August 2017 attacks. The report noted that the 33rd and 99th Light Infantry Divisions, known for committing abuses in the past, were sent to Rakhine State only weeks before the attacks happened, suggesting that the ensuing military crackdown was planned in advance. Thirteen military officials were also implicated in the report as being the primary sanctioners of the crackdown.

Myanmar's military announced in late December that it would resume "clearance operations" in northern Rakhine State after one policeman and three Rakhine Buddhist civilians were found murdered shortly after they were reported missing. Two Maramagyi fishermen were also kidnapped and stabbed by six unidentified assailants speaking "Bengali", but they managed to escape their abductors according to Myanmar's commander-in-chief Min Aung Hlaing.

==== 2019 ====
Myanmar Radio and Television stated on 20 January that 10 members of ARSA attacked a post of the Border Guard Police near Maungdaw Township's Wet Kyein village on 16 January, leaving six policemen wounded.

Two border guard policemen and an engineer of the Military Engineer Corps were wounded by gunfire near a border guard post near Wai Lar Taung village in Maungdaw Township according to a Tatmadaw spokesman on 24 January. The spokesman claimed the unidentified attackers fired at them from Bangladesh. The General Administration Department however blamed the attack on ARSA. It cited a police report stating that 40 ARSA insurgents had attacked the post in order to capture it, but were forced to flee by the officers who received help from another regiment.

A mine attack on a police vehicle traveling between villages of Muangdaw Township was conducted by ARSA on 22 April according to the Tatmadaw, injuring its driver. Two security personnel were killed in an ambush of a border outpost by unknown gunmen from across Bangladesh on 7 July. Brig. Gen. Zaw Min Tun told Radio Free Asia that the area from where the attack occurred was controlled by ARSA and the group was suspected. Two ARSA members were killed and three arrested on 21 November in Muangdaw, according to the Tatmadaw.

==== 2020 ====
A sub-lieutenant of the Tatmadaw and three civilian contractors were killed in March 2020, after their vehicle transporting materials for building a border fence hit an ARSA mine. Two people were killed and three injured after ARSA exploded motorbikes of 12 Daingnets and shot at them near Bawtala Village in Maungdaw Township on 30 March, according to the state media.

The Tatmadaw stated that it had seized ammunition and military equipment from an ARSA camp in the village of Kha Maung Seik on 8 April. Later, it stated that two policemen were killed in the village after being ambushed by the group on 15 April. Two members of the group were found dead with improvised landmines on 29 April according to it.

A Border Guard Police unit was attacked by ARSA insurgents near the Bangladesh–Myanmar border on 2 May according to Myawady Daily, injuring two officers. According to the military, the insurgents retreated after it arrived to assist the police force.

Two alleged ARSA insurgents were killed in a confrontation with Myanmar security forces at the Bangladesh–Myanmar border on 4 June near Mee Dike village, according to the Tatmadaw, which stated that around 30 insurgents opened fire on a routine border patrol by the border police and retreated after 30 minutes of fighting. Some policemen were also injured per the military.

Three residents of Khayay Myaing village were killed and six others wounded when their vehicle struck a mine in Maungdaw Township on 17 November. Maungdaw District administrator Soe Aung stated that the government believed that ARSA was behind the blast. In middle of 2020, an Islamist insurgent group Islami Mahaz claimed responsibility for several attacks against Myanmar. Islami Mahaz was also responsible for killing of people in refugee camp who were allegedly supporters of ARSA.

=== During the Myanmar civil war (2021–present) ===
The Rohingya Solidarity Organization (RSO) claimed to have killed 22 Myanmar Army soldiers on 30 March 2021 after attacking a military camp in Rakhine State. The RSO re-emerged amidst the clashes in Rakhine State, and started targeting people who supported ARSA. Rohingya Islami Mahaz allied with RSO following the rearmament of the group.

The conflict also allowed another armed Rohingya group named Arakan Rohingya Army (ARA), led by Abdullah Kane and reportedly consisting of former RSO members, to emerge. In May, a furniture seller and a former village administrator were kidnapped and robbed. A village administrator of Padin village also suffered the same treatment in August. An administrator of Pan Taw Pyin village in Maungdaw was killed on 2 September, while two others were wounded. The Rohingya Nationalist Organization, based in the Kutupalong refugee camp, accused Kane's group of being behind the attacks.

ARSA started re-emerging in Maungdaw District around November 2021, after allying with the National Unity Government formed in opposition to the military junta that took power after the 2021 Myanmar coup d'état. The group clashed with the military in Maungdaw during November. Maung Hla, the administrative officer of Khone Taing village, stated that their base was located in Wela hills, about 20 miles (32 km) north of Maungdaw.

On 7 December, 23 residents of Khone Taing village were shot at by ARSA near La Baw Chaung mountain, located around 2 miles (3.2 km) from the village, injuring one of them.

Several images and videos appeared on social media in early-January 2022, purportedly showing more than 50 members of the group along with its leaders taking part in a military drill in Maungdaw. The group clashed with the Arakan Army on 19 July 2023 in the Mayu mountains near Sein Hnyin Pyar and Gu Dar Pyin villages. The AA claimed that five ARSA members and one AA member were killed, with the AA seizing an ARSA outpost. ARSA was accused of killing a villager of Meekyaungkaungswe village in Buthidaung Township on 10 September.

The ARA remerged under Nabi Hossain in February 2024, with a purported video of Nabi showing off weapons and ammunition seized from the Border Guard Police on 5 February and asking Rohingyas to join the struggle against the Tatmadaw being released on social media. Witnesses later stated that the group had seized a BGP camp in Dhekibuniya, but were forced to flee to Bangladesh after they were attacked by Arakan Army and the RSO on the following day.

ARSA meanwhile began cooperating with the Tatmadaw in 2024. It was also accused of killing two civilians in Taung Pyo Let Wae town of Maungdaw Township on 7 March 2024. Local residents then urged the Arakan Army to start "clearance operations" against ARSA. On 12 April, clashes broke out between the Arakan Army and the junta-supported fighters of ARSA based in U Hla Hpay, Ywet Nyo Taung and Kun Taing villages of Buthidaung Township. ARSA and ARA were also accused of burning down homes and kidnapping civilians in Buthidaung Township.

The RSO and the ARA were reported in May 2024 to be forcibly recruiting Rohingyas from refugee camps in Bangladesh for both the Tatmadaw and Arakan Army. The RSO for its part claimed that it was only apprehending its own members and that of the ARA. Arakan Army spokesman Khaing Thuka meanwhile criticized the two groups as well as ARSA for their recruitment practices in camps in Bangladesh.

ARSA launched a large scale attack against camps and outposts of the Arakan Army in the town of Taungpyoletwea of Maungdaw Township on 10 and 11 August 2025. On 22 September, it claimed to have captured a main base of the Arakan Army in the Maungdaw Township, the AA however denied the claim, stating that ARSA did attack a border outpost but retreated into Bangladesh after a counterattack.

The Development Media Group stated that 40 Rakhine civilians had been killed and 17 injured in ARSA attacks from May 2025 to 23 October 2025. By late-November 2025, fighting between the Arakan Army and the Rohingya militant groups ARSA and RSO were reported to have intensified.

== Arakan Army insurgency ==
=== 2018 ===
Clashes in Buthidaung Township and Rathedaung Township between the Arakan Army, an ethnic Rakhine insurgent group, and the Tatmadaw, killed four soldiers and an unknown number of Arakan Army insurgents according to Myawady Daily. It also stated that army men with senior ranks were killed, but did not provide any details. The clash started on 3 December and continued till 5 December according to Myawady, after it was ambushed during area-clearance operations near the border with Bangladesh. Arakan Army said that the conflict occurred after Tatmadaw entered territory controlled by them. The clashes intensified by the next week, forcing 330 people to flee from Buthidaung. The Arakan Army had earlier clashed with Myanmar's Army in April 2015.

Rathedaung, Ponnagyun, Kyauktaw, Buthidaung and Paletwa townships meanwhile experienced clashes between Arakan Army and Tatmadaw throughout December. The Arakan Army accused Tatmadaw of using heavy weapons as well as helicopters in Paletwa, but Zaw Htay rejected usage of helicopters in fighting. Villagers meanwhile accused Tatmadaw of detaining civilians and stated over 2,000 people had fled due to the clashes.

=== 2019 ===
==== January Arakan Army attacks ====
The government-owned Global New Light of Myanmar reported on 1 January that 30 insurgents of the Arakan Army had attacked members of the Border Guard Police (BGP) that day in Bathidaung Township's Saytaung village, leaving one policeman gravely wounded. The Arakan Army denied responsibility, but admitted it had clashed with other members of Myanmar's security forces. On 4 January, around 300 members of the Arakan Army launched pre-dawn attacks on four border police outposts—Kyaung Taung, Nga Myin Taw, Ka Htee La and Kone Myint—in northern Buthidaung Township. Thirteen members of the Border Guard Police (BGP) were killed and nine others were injured, whilst 40 firearms and more than 10,000 rounds of ammunition were looted. The Arakan Army later stated that it had captured nine BGP personnel and five civilians, and that three of its fighters were also killed in the attacks. Following the attacks, the Office of the President of Myanmar held a high-level meeting on national security in the capital Naypyidaw on 7 January, and instructed the Defense Ministry to increase troop deployments in the areas that were attacked and to use aircraft if necessary.

==== Myanmar Army's response and subsequent clashes ====
Myanmar Army soldiers from the 22nd Light Infantry Division, elements of the 66th and 99th Light Infantry Divisions, and other battalions from the Western Command were reportedly involved in the subsequent military offensive against the Arakan Army. Clashes were reported in Maungdaw, Buthidaung, Kyauktaw, Rathedaung and Ponnagyun Townships, located in the northern and central parts of Rakhine State. The Myanmar Army claimed it killed 13 Arakan Army insurgents in military operations between 5 and 16 January.

Immediately after the initial attacks, the Rakhine State government issued a notice blocking non-governmental organisations and UN agencies, except for the International Committee of the Red Cross and the World Food Programme, from travelling to rural areas in these townships affected by the conflict. The fighting prompted 5,000 civilians to flee from their homes and to take shelter in monasteries and communal areas across the region, according to the UN Office for the Coordination of Humanitarian Affairs. Civilian casualties, arbitrary detention of ethnic Rakhine villagers, looting of homes, and military blockage of food aid and medical relief were also reported.

A mine explosion killed two police officers and injured two others in Ponnagyun Township on 27 February, after which the police convoy they were travelling with came under gunfire. The police blamed the attack on Arakan Army. From September 2018 to February 2019, about four people believed to be informants were killed, leading to suspicion that they were being targeted by Arakan Army and Tatmadaw.

Around 60 Arakan Army insurgents launched an evening attack on Yoe-ta-yoke Police Station on 9 March. According to a leaked combat report, nine policemen were killed, two were injured, and a dozen weapons, including 10 BA-63 battle rifles, were stolen by the attackers. On the same day, Arakan Army insurgents managed to conquer the front line commanding post of Rakhine State's Gwa Township-based No. 563 Light Infantry Battalion under the supervision of Light Infantry Division No. 5. According to a press release by the Arakan Army, 11 personnel, including four military engineers, were captured and 16 backhoe excavators, one Toyota car, a dump truck, and 60 mm and 80 mm mortars were confiscated.

About 400 villagers fled fighting in Mrauk U from 16 to 17 March. The Arakan Army, however, claimed that the military was staging false battles and firing upon living areas of civilians. The clashes in the town meanwhile had damaged archaeological buildings. Six civilians were injured on 18 March according to residents of the township during firing. The military claimed that its convoy was ambushed by the Arakan Army. Residents of the town, however, said that they indiscriminately targeted civilian areas and did not clash with any rebels.

Two police officers and a wife of one of the officers were killed in an attack by 200 members of Arakan Army on a police base in Mrauk U on 9 April. An Arakan Army spokesman, however, denied any civilians were harmed, claiming the base was being used to store heavy weapons only. Residents meanwhile reported that the military was using warplanes. During clashes between Arakan Army and Tatmadaw on 21 May killed two Rohingyas of Kyauktaw Township's Alae Gyun village when their home was hit by a shell. A battle in Minbya Township that started on 2 June left casualties on both sides. Four civilians were also killed and six injured when a shell fell on a monastery of Sapar Htar village the next day.

The government of Myanmar announced authorisation for the Tatmadaw to use helicopters against insurgents on 7 June. Battles between Arakan Army and the military near Minya township's Shwegyin village and Ghahtar Taung Dam in Mrauk-U township caused hundreds of villagers to flee in late June. Clashes between two sides occurred in Kyauktaw and Rathedaung townships on 8 August, leaving casualties on both sides.

The Arakan Army attacked a border police post in Nyaungchaung village of Buthidaung township on 26 July, with two policemen and four villagers being wounded in the resulting clashes. A mine attack on a police convoy by the Arakan Army killed three policemen on 20 August near Pat Kwet village per the Myanmar Police Force. On 23 August, airplanes were called into action against Arakan Army in Minbya Township. Meanwhile, the clashes since January had left over 100 civilians dead. On 28 August, the rebels attacked a base of Tatmadaw in Mrauk-U. A battle between the Tatmadaw and Arakan Army saw the latter temporarily capture their artillery base in Myebon Township on 24 September.

On 26 October, a group of 30 Arakan Army insurgents boarded a civilian ferry and kidnapped 58 off-duty soldiers and policemen. The next day, three boats carrying the hostages were attacked by government helicopters, sinking two and resulting in the deaths of several insurgents and hostages. Fifteen of the hostages were later rescued. On 3 November, the Arakan Army abducted ten people from a speedboat which included a Member of Parliament belonging to National League for Democracy (NLD) and five Indian workers. An Indian died the next day which the Arakan Army stated was due to fatigue while walking. Everyone were released later except the lawmaker, whom the Arakan Army said was their real target. The MP was released in January 2020.

A Rohingya Muslim civilian was killed during firing between Arakan Army and Tatmadaw in Phone Nyo Leik village of Buthidaung Township on 6 November 2019. Meanwhile 35 houses of Thayatpyin village were burnt in the shelling. Nearly 1,700 civilians fled from three townships fearing the army's clearance operations in the next week. The Arakan Army accused the military of causing the death of NLD's Buthidaung Township chairman Ye Thein after attacking it on 25 December. The Tatmadaw, however, denied that any such clashes took place in Buthidaung and the NLD blamed the Arakan Army for the death.

=== 2020 ===
On 13 February, at least 19 Rakhine children were wounded due to shelling that struck a school of Khamwe Chaung village in Buthidaung Township. Both the Tatmadaw and Arakan Army blamed each other for the shelling. Five civilians were injured due to shelling on Pike The and Let Saung Kauk villages of Kyauktaw Township on 11 May after a military truck was attacked. The Tatmadaw blamed the Arakan Army of attacking them, but stated that there was no clash in the township.

On 29 May, the Arakan Army ambushed a border police outpost and killed four policemen in Thazin Myaing village of Rathedaung Township according to the Tatmadaw. The Arakan Army confirmed the attack and stated it was in retaliation for the Tatmadaw attacking their medical facility in Chin State's Paletwa Township earlier. Six policemen and three civilians were also kidnapped, but the civilians were later released. The Irrawaddy reported in July 2020 that three Arakan Liberation Army members who were abducted by Arakan Army in May were later killed according to a party source.

A military column on the outskirts of Ponnagyun Township was attacked by the Arakan Army with a remotely detonated mine on 2 June according to the Tatmadaw, leading to the death of a civilian and an unknown number of soldiers. The group later attacked vessels of the Myanmar navy near Amyint Kyun village of Sittwe Township on 10 June according to residents and the Tatmadaw, leading to the navy returning fire. The resulting shelling killed a civilian and injured four people. The Tatmadaw stated that on 13 June that the Arakan Army had attacked the Done Pike border guard outpost in Rathedaung Township and injured some police officers. Later on 23 June, it stated that three border guards and a civilian were killed after an ambush by the Arakan Army a day earlier near Kotankauk village in Rathedaung Township.

Thousands of civilians fled after local governments informed 40 villages of clearance operations in late June, but the Burmese military later stated that operations would only be carried out in five villages. MP Khin Maung Latt said on 29 June that 10,000 people had left their villages since the issuance of the order. It was later revoked by the state government which said that residents had misunderstood the notification. By July 2020, the Arakan Army had started collecting taxes and policing areas, following up on its announcement in December 2019 about setting up a "Rakhine People's Authority".

The village chief of Ton Ma Wa in Paletwa Township was found dead on 17 July, after being abducted by the Arakan Army on 5 June. The Khumi Affairs Coordination Council accused the group of killing him. Tatmadaw officials reported about the insurgents ambushing soldiers, policemen and government officials between 3 and 4 August, resulting in casualties on the government side as well as the death of a government official. The Arakan Liberation Party accused the group of abducting five of its members near Myaung Gyi village of Ponnagyun Township on 10 August. They were released on 18 August.

On 4 September, Tatmadaw spokesman Zaw Min Tun accused the Arakan Army of exploding landmines near a police convoy escorted by the military in Kyauktaw Township. He also denied reports claiming the Tatmadaw had burned down the villages of Phayar Paung and Taung Pauk, and further stated that two soldiers had been found dead. The Arakan Army, however, rejected mounting any attack, claimed the two deceased were civilians, and accused the Tatmadaw of fabricating narratives as an excuse for their arson on the two villages. The accounts of arson by the military were also reported by locals, who also stated that two civilians had been killed.

Chin State's Municipal Minister Soe Htet and eleven government officials accompanying him were caught in an attack by the Arakan Army on 9 September, forcing them to return to Paletwa. The Tatmadaw's True News Information stated that the group had attacked a military base and not him.

About 3,000 were displaced on 23 September during military operations near Gutaung village of Rathedaung Township. Clashes intensified in Rathedaung on 3 October, with the military bringing in jet planes and the Myanmar Navy as it engaged in clashes with the Arakan Army for control of a strategic hill near Aungtharzi village. The military claimed to have taken the hill on 4 October, but the Arakan Army stated on the following day that it had retaken it. Fighting also took place near Kyauktan village of Rathedaung Township, with the military calling in fighter jets to bomb the group.

The Arakan Army abducted three NLD candidates from Taunggok Township on 14 October, with a witness alleging that they also beat up 11 people. It demanded the release of student protesters and other civilians who had been arrested, in exchange for the release of the candidates. The group later struck a temporary outpost of the Tatmadaw at Mount Mayu near Inn Din village and an outpost of the Border Guard Police near Ahtet Nan Yar village of Rathedaung Township on 26 October. The military's spokesman Major General Zaw Min Tun stated that they had suffered casualties, without specifying the death toll.

The Arakan Army announced a unilateral ceasefire in late November so that voting for the 2020 general election, which had earlier been cancelled in nine townships in northern Rakhine State, could be held by the end of the year. The Tatmadaw also entered into dialogue, with clashes ceasing after the election.

=== 2021 ===
On 1 January 2021, following negotiations with the Tatmadaw, the Arakan Army released the NLD candidates it had abducted in October 2020, along with three soldiers. The Arakan Army also called for the release of Rakhine politicians, civilians and its own members. Despite both the Tatmadaw and Arakan Army backing elections in northern Rakhine, the NLD government later expressed reluctance in holding it stating there were no security guarantees by either side.

The State Administration Council military junta installed following the February 2021 coup d'état removed the Arakan Army from Myanmar's list of terrorist groups on 11 March, citing the organisation's decision in late 2020 to halt its attacks and in order to encourage peace. The Northern Alliance consisting of the Arakan Army, Ta'ang National Liberation Army and Myanmar National Democratic Alliance Army, however, warned on 30 March it would join the protestors in opposing the coup if the military did not stop attacking them, putting the ceasefire at risk.

The Arakan Army's leader Twan Mrat Naing stated in April 2021 that he did not want the anti-coup protests to spread to Rakhine State, believing it may jeopardise negotiations between his forces and the Tatmadaw. However, he also expressed sympathy for the civilians killed by the Tatmadaw, and promised to "help every ethnic group achieve their political goals". As part of peace efforts, 10 ethnic Rakhine prisoners, including three relatives of Naing, were cleared of all charges relating to seizure of explosives in Mandalay and released on 9 June.

Six military officers captured in clashes were released by the Arakan Army on 16 June, in Kyauk Kyak village of Mrauk-U Township. A day later, 17 policemen and soldiers abducted from the Shwe Nadi ferry on the Mayu River in October 2019 were released by the group near the Taintaungpyin village in Buthidaung township.

On 27 June, the Arakan Army disarmed more than 20 policemen stationed at a temporary outpost in the Mahamuni Buddha Temple in Kyauktaw Township, after surrounding it. The stationing of the police forces at the temple had been a source of contention. The group's spokesman later stated that the situation had been resolved peacefully.

The Arakan Army and its political wing United League of Arakan (ULA) started asserting administrative control over the region since the coup, issuing stay-at-home orders on 20 July in response to the COVID-19 pandemic, in addition to announcing the setting up of a dispute resolution mechanism and asking civilians to report crimes to the ULA on 1 August. In response, the Tatmadaw started strengthening its troops numbers in the state, increasing inspections of homes at night, and maintaining a list of visitors from outside Rakhine. Pe Than, a former MP of the Pyithu Hluttaw from Myebon Township, told Radio Free Asia in September 2021 that the Arakan Army controlled 80% of the region while the junta's administrative system had collapsed.

Clashes between the Arakan Army and the Tatmadaw broke out on 9 November, the first time since the ceasefire came in effect, to the north of Maungdaw. The group accused the Tatmadaw of provoking the fighting by entering an area controlled by it. The military, however, denied it had clashed with them, stating that it had only fought ARSA.

=== 2022 ===
Aung Thaung Shwe, a former MP of the Pyithu Hluttaw, told Radio Free Asia in January 2022 that people of Rakhine State were increasingly relying on the Arakan Army's judicial system and crime had significantly dropped since the group took over the state's judiciary. Pe Than estimated that the group controlled two-thirds of Rakhine and added that the military was finding it difficult to move freely in the state.

Soldiers from the 352nd Light Infantry Battalion attacked an outpost of Arakan Army in Letpan mountains near Mee Taik village, located in Maungdaw, on 4 February. This resulted in the death of an Arakan Army member. The two sides clashed again on 6 February for three hours, and the Arakan Army ambushed a vehicle of the Tatmadaw on the following day. At least seven soldiers and two civilians were known to have been killed in the clashes. It later attacked two columns of the Tatmadaw in Wai Lar mountains in northern Maungdaw, with The Irrawaddy stating that dozens of soldiers were killed and several captured. The clashes however ceased after negotiations between the two sides.

The Arakan Army threatened to resume hostilities in April 2022, in response to the Tatmadaw's interference in ULA courts and opposition to the Arakan Army officials meeting with Rohingyas. A brief clash took between the two sides in Wet Gaung village of Myebon Township on 12 April according to locals. Meanwhile, the military forces started arresting people for being linked to the Arakan Army, something it had avoided since the beginning of the ceasefire. These arrests and inspections of Rakhine villages peaked in mid-April. On 6 May, the Arakan Army's chief Tun Myat Naing warned Maj. Gen. Htin Latt Oo, commander of the Western Command of the Tatmadaw.

A clash took place between the military and the Arakan Army near Than Htaung village of Paletwa Township on 15 May. The group stated on the same day that renewed clashes could break out at any time, and urged civilians to avoid areas where the Myanmar Army was stationed. The National Unity Government held talks with the Arakan Army for the first time on 16 May and referred to it as the "ULA/AA-led Rakhine People's Government".

Clashes occurred between the military and the Arakan Army near Mount Suu Poke, located near Abaung Thar village of Paletwa Township, on 26 May and involved artillery. The group abducted thirteen security personnel in Rakhine State in June 2022 in response to the military arresting its staff. On 18 July, clashes broke out between the two sides in Maungdaw Township after the group attacked the Tatmadaw and the Border Guard in retaliation for the military killing six of its members while bombing its outpost in Karen State on 4 July. The group captured fourteen security personnel, while also claiming to have killed around twenty more.

On 18 July, battles erupted between the two sides in three areas of Rathedaung and Muangdaw townships. On 24 July they clashed near Abaung Thar village, while another clash took place in Maungdaw Township on 26 July. A battle between them began on 2 August near Namada village in Paletwa Township. The junta lost at least 14 soldiers and an unspecified number of Border Police members in the clashes. On the same day, the Arakan Army abducted ALP leader Lt. Col. Khaing Paw Lin.

On 13 August, the Arakan Army and the Tatmadaw clashed in Paletwa, Rathedaung and Maungdaw townships. The group claimed that 37 soldiers were killed in the clashes. On 15 August, it attacked two hilltop outposts of Light Infantry Battalion 289 in Paletwa. A clash took place near the Bangladesh–Myanmar border in Muangdaw Township on the following day. A days-long battle erupted between the two sides near Ah Baung Thar, Hna Maung Dar and Ree Ma Wa villages of Paletwa Township on 21 August, forcing around 1,000 civilians to flee from the three villages.

The Tatmadaw bombed suspected Arakan Army camps in northern Maungdaw Township on 25 August, while an attack by the group at a military camp located on the Kha Moung Seik Byuhar hill led to a battle breaking out between the two sides. The Tatmadaw and the police were also forced to abandon a police station in Thang Htaung on the same day. On 27 August, the group attacked an outpost in Kha Maung Seik, with the Tatmadaw conducting airstrikes to counter them. On the following day, it ambushed a military column in Lekka village of Mrauk-U Township.

More than 5,000 civilians from ten villages in Rathedaung Township were forced to flee on 30 August after a battle broke out between the two sides near Ma Nyin Taung village. The Arakan Army claimed that they clashed with the Tatmadaw near Myeik Wa village in Paletwa Township on the following day, with ten soldiers being killed. The group also captured a police outpost near the border with Bangladesh in Maungdaw Township on the same day, and claimed to have killed 19 policemen. Overall it captured 30 military outposts in Rakhine State and six in Paletwa Township in August.

Amidst the resumed fighting, Bangladesh expressed concerns over repeated violations of its airspace and artillery from Myanmar landing in its territory. On 10 September, the Arakan Army captured an outpost of Infantry Battalion 352 located 3 kilometres (1.9 mi) from Jade Chaung village in Maungdaw Township. 13 soldiers were killed in the fighting according to Western News, while four were captured. The group also attacked a hilltop base of the Tatmadaw near Temawa village in Paletwa Township on 15 September, leading to heavy clashes. A Rohingya refugee was killed and six others were injured on the following day when shells fired from Myanmar landed inside the territory of Bangladesh.

The Arakan Army captured the Lake Ya outpost near the border with Bangladesh in Maungdaw Township on 10 October, killing 30 soldiers and capturing three. Four soldiers were killed in Rathedaung Township on 26 October, while in Buthidaung Township 11 were killed and more than 15 were injured on 28 October according to the Arakan Army. Clashes occurred in Kyauktaw, Mrauk-U and Paletwa townships on 29 October, while the group claimed to have killed five soldiers of Light Infantry Battalion 374 on the following day. The group later stated that three soldiers were killed and ten were wounded near Thayargone village in Maungdaw Township on 31 October when Light Infantry Battalion 201 troops entered its territory.

The Arakan Army claimed to have killed at least three soldiers in an ambush near Ywa Pakar village in Taungup Township on 1 November. Three Border Guard members were also killed and six others were injured. Several soldiers were killed in a mine attack on a military convoy near Kywe Tet Pyin village in Maungdaw Township on 2 November. Fighting also broke out near Myeik Wa Village in Paletwa Township on the same day. Based on local news reports and statements by the Arakan Army, The Diplomat identified that more than 100 battles had occurred in the state between July and November 2022.

On 26 November, the Arakan Army and the junta agreed to a temporary ceasefire beginning on the following day. It was brokered by Yōhei Sasakawa of the Nippon Foundation who acted as an intermediary. AA spokseman Khine Thu Kha stated that they agreed to it for humanitarian reasons and not because of international pressure. The group did not withdraw from fortifications held at the time of the ceasefire. A junta official told The Irrawaddy that it was the first step towards a permanent ceasefire. As of mid-December, tensions remained high with forces from both sides remaining in deployment within northern Rakhine State.

=== 2023 ===
Three commanders of the Arakan Liberation Army were assassinated in Sittwe on 4 January 2023, including the commander-in-chief Khaing Soe Mya and the commander of Battalion 101 Khaing Kyaw Soe. The group blamed the Arakan Army, which denied any involvement. On 1 July, three more ALP members were assassinated in Sittwe, including ALP vice chairman Khaing Ni Yaung, Battalion 1 commander Khaing Kyaw Min, and a private. The ALP accused the AA of being behind it, with the group rejecting the charge.

The Arakan Army launched attacks against the outposts of the Border Guard Police in Rathedaung Township as part of Operation 1027 on 13 November 2023, before expanding their attacks on junta forces to other towns. According to AA reports, the junta forces had abandoned almost 40 outposts by the next day, leading to 34 junta troops and six AA fighters being killed. It captured Pauktaw Township on 16 November, however the Tamatdaw retook it the same day By 23 November, the group had captured ten bases. On 14 December, it stated that it had captured 142 military positions during the offensive. The group captured the Taw Ma Taung military camp in Mrauk-U Township on 25 December and the Mrauk-U District police station on the following day.

=== 2024 ===
On 8 January 2024, the Arakan Army captured the Taung Shey Taung base in Kyauktaw Township after the surrender of about 200 soldiers. Meanwhile, they escalated their offensive into Paletwa Township as part of Operation 1027, and claimed to have captured all junta bases in west of Paletwa with 255 junta soldiers fleeing to India. The AA also attacked the Danyawaddy Naval Base in Kyaukphyu Township, which is the main naval base of the junta in southern Rakhine, and captured a junta outpost in Mrauk-U Township.

On 10 January, the Arakan Army attacked the Light Infantry Battalion 539 and Artillery Battalion 377 stationed near Kan Sauk village in Kyauktaw Township. It captured the Artillery Battalion 377 base on the Sittwe-Yangon highway on 14 January, and later the Light Infantry Battalion 539 on 16 January after nearly 300 soldiers of the battalion surrendered. On 14 January, the group seized the Paletwa Township and declared it a "Military Council-free area." The Government of India meanwhile announced a plan to fence the Indo-Myanmar border in response to over 600 Tatmadaw soldiers fleeing to India since the Arakan Army had resumed its offensive.

On 24 January, the Arakan Army recaptured Pauktaw, concluding a three-month battle. Meanwhile, at least 229 Border Guard Police personnel had fled to Bangladesh amidst the resumed fighting. On 5 February, a Bangladeshi woman and a Rohingya man died from a mortar shell that fell on the Ghumdum border in Bandarban, reportedly fired by Burmese forces.

The Arakan Army declared that it had defeated Light Infantry Battalions 379 and 541 on 6 February, gaining effective control of Minbya Township. By the following day it captured the Kyauktaw Township, while having seized more than 170 junta bases. On 8 February, the Arakan Army declared that it had taken complete control over the Mrauk-U Township after capturing the base of Police Battalion 31. In response to the group's successes, the junta blew up bridges in Kyauktaw Township and Sittwe.

On 15 February, the Arakan Army captured the Myebon Township. On 16 February, Tatmadaw forces retreated from Ma-ei town of Taungup Township, allowing the Arakan Army to take control. The soldiers also blew up two bridges while retreating. On 22 February, the group captured the Myoma police station in Ponnagyun Township. It also claimed to have killed around 80 soldiers in Ramree Township during clashes from 24 to 26 February. On 5 March it captured the Ponnagyun Township. 177 soldiers fled to the Bandarban district of Bangladesh on 12 March. Meanwhile, the group captured the Ramree Township on the same day after a three-month battle. It captured Rathedaung town on 17 March, as well as the headquarters of Light Infantry Battalions 536, 537 and 538, bringing the number of military bases captured by the group to 180, while around 200 surviving soldiers fled the area. On 20 March, the group claimed that Rohingya conscripts were among the dead Tatmadaw forces after it seized the three bases. Residents of the state, Rohingya activists and the Arakan Army later also stated that the junta was forcing Rohingyas to protest against the group. The Arakan Army on 25 March captured the base of Light Infantry Battalion 552 in Buthidaung Township and Ta Man Thar outpost in Maungdaw Township where about 100 security personnel of the junta surrendered. The group also captured the Taung Bazar military camp in Buthidaung Township during the same day after clashing with the 234th Infantry Battalion, killing eight soldiers.

Clashes between the Arakan Army and the junta broke out near the Western Military Command's headquarters of Ann Township and in the Ngape Township of Magway Region on 24 March, after the junta attacked a base of the group. The Arakan Army clashed with Light Infantry Battalion 346 and other junta forces in Lone village of Ann Township on 26 March, claiming to have killed fifteen soldiers and wounding another fifteen while receiving two injuries to its own forces. In addition, it also attacked junta troops in Tone Gyi and Chaung Phyar villages of Ngape Township on 26 and 28 March respectively, claiming to kill ten soldiers and wounding eighteen others. The group also stated that it clashed with the Light Infantry Battalion 563 in Myebon Township. Narinjara News cited residents as stating that soldiers and all family members of personnel of Light Infantry Battalion 372 and its supply unit in Ann Township retreating to the headquarters of Western Military Command on 27 March, while clashes were taking place in Pyaung Thay and Nga Let Kya villages of the township. On 2 April, the Arakan Army stated that it had cut off access to the road connecting Ann Township with the town of Padein in Magway Region.

Clashes broke out near the Tha Htay hydropower plant in Thandwe Township on 22 April. Tatmadaw troops blew up a bridge linking two villages in Buthidaung Township on 25 April, and a major bridge on the Mayu river in the same township on 6 May after losing five military battalion headquarters, including that of the Light Infantry Battalion 552, the Light Infantry Battalion 564 on 5 April, the Light Infantry Battalion 565 on 24 April, Military Operations Command 15 on 2 May and Light Infantry Battalion 551 on 3 May. The group also captured four military bases in Maungdaw Township, including that of Number 1 Border Guard Police Battalion and Number 10 Border Guard Police Battalion. The Arakan Army stated on 6 May that around 200 soldiers had surrendered after it captured the Number 15 Operation Command Headquarters in Buthidaung. It declared complete control over Buthidaung Township on 18 May, after seizing the bases of the Strategic Military Command, Light Infantry Battalions 234, 345 and 352, Artillery Battalion 378 and a logistics and engineering battalion. Clashes meanwhile continued outside Buthidaung town.

By early June 2024, only five outposts on the border with Bangladesh remained under the control of the junta, as the Arakan Army captured the Border Guard Station No. 6 in Inn Din village on 6 June. 28 more soldiers of the Tatmadaw fled to Bangladesh and were handed over to the Border Guard Bangladesh on 11 June after escaping from the Arakan Army. Meanwhile, the group claimed to have captured ten junta bases in Maungdaw Township from 1 June to 13 June, including three headquarters of the Border Guard Forces and an army base, killing over 200 personnel.

By 25 June, the Arakan Army had captured the town of Thandwe, with the junta's security forces retreating to the Thandwe Airport. A World Food Programme warehouse was meanwhile robbed and burnt in Maungdaw Township on 23 June. The Arakan Army blamed the attack on the Tatmadaw and local Rohingyas, while Nay San Lwin of the Free Rohingya Coalition advocacy group blamed both the Tatmadaw and the Arakan Army.

Around sixty junta personnel attempting to flee to Bangladesh from the Arakan Army were forced to return on 14 July by the Bangladeshi authorities. Tatmadaw personnel retreating from Thandwe Township to Gwa Township blew up a bridge near the town of Kyeintali on 24 July. On 29 July, the Arakan Army began attacking the headquarters of the 5th Border Guard Police Battalion, the last junta outpost in Maungdaw. The residents stated that the Arakan Rohingya Salvation Army, Rohingya Solidarity Organization, and forcibly recruited Rohingya conscripts were fighting alongside the junta personnel.

The Arakan Army began assaulting the town of Kyeintali and its countryside on 10 August, taking complete control on 14 August. The forces of the junta regrouped between Kyeintali and the town of Gwa. The group announced the capture of Myanmar Navy's Maung Shwe Lay Navy Base on 7 September, marking the completion of its offensive of bringing the Thandwe Township under its control, killing over 400 security personnel of the junta in the battle. 123 members of the Tatmadaw and Border Guard Police seeking refuge in Bangladesh were deported back to Myanmar on 29 September. Meanwhile, the Arakan Army began a siege of the Mae Taung strategic bases in Ann Township on 26 September, seizing all of them by 7 October. In addition, all the remaining troops in the area of Kyeintali retreated to Gwa.

By November, the Arakan Army had encircled the Western Command of the Tatmadaw as well as the town of Ann, after having captured the bases of Sway Chaung and Mae Taung outposts, Light Infantry Battalions 372 and 373, a field medical battalion, a logistics battalion, a security affairs battalion, as well as a military hospital in the Ann Township. It also seized the Mount Pan Mrauk artillery battalion base in the Taungup Township. On 6 November, the group seized the bases of Light Infantry Battalion 371 and an Ordnance Corps. Anti-junta groups Chin Defense Force (Asho) and People's Revolution Alliance (Magway) meanwhile started clashing with the Tatmadaw on the Ann-Padan Road along the border between Rakhine and Magwe Region, in order to prevent the junta troops from reinforcing their compatriots. On 28 November, the Arakan Army declared that they had completely captured the town of Taungup and ten military camps after clashing with the junta for 17 days.

On 8 December, the Arakan Army seized complete control of the Maungdaw Township and the Bangladesh–Myanmar border after capturing Border Guard Police Battalion No. 5, the last stronghold of the junta along the border after a long 6 months Battle of Maungdaw. The group also captured Brigadier General Thurein Tun, head of Military Operation Command 15, along with other soldiers, including around 80 Rohingyas. The group also captured the Taungup Township on 14 December after taking control of the headquarters of the Military Operations Command 5. The group captured the Western Military Command in Ann town on 20 December after two weeks of clashes, with many junta troops surrendering and being evacuated.

On 29 December, the Arakan Army declared that it had captured the town of Gwa after seizing all the military bases there, including those of Light Infantry Battalions 562 and 563. It however continued clashing with the junta which launched a counterattack after withdrawing from the town. The group stated that around 700 junta troops and several military commanders were killed defending the town, including Colonel Than Soe Win, commander of the 11th Light Infantry Division. Having seized complete control of Gwa Township, which marked its seizure of 14 out of 17 townships in the Rakhine State, the Arakan Army stated that it was ready to implement a ceasefire as long as the junta was willing to resolve the conflict through political means.

=== 2025 ===
On 1 January 2025, the Arakan Army attacked a junta checkpoint in the Taung Pone Gyi village near Pandaung Township of Bago Region and located on the border between Rakhine and Bago. The checkpoint served as a defense for nearby arms factories in the Bago Region. By late-January 2025, the group claimed to have captured multiple military bases from the junta along the borders of Rakhine State, Magway, Bago, and Ayeyarwady regions. Among the seized positions were the Moe Hti base located between Taungup and Padaung townships, as well as the Point 263 and Point 369 bases along the Rakhine-Ayeyarwady border.

The Arakan Army also clashed with the junta near the Shwe Thaung Yan town in Ayeyarwady Region in late-January 2025, with residents reporting that it had captured two villages. In addition, the group reported that junta soldiers deserted the Goksiyoe village on the Rakhine-Magwe border and the Arakan Army was advancing along the Ann-Padan road towards Magwe Region's Ngape Township with assistance from three local resistance groups. Chin Defence Force (Asho) stated that it captured 17 junta soldiers as they were retreating from Ann Township along the Ann-Padan road.

The NGO Fortify Rights on 23 February alleged that the Arakan Army was executing civilians and captured soldiers, while also urging the International Criminal Court to investigate after a video emerged showing fighters of the group and other men abusing and executing two captured junta soldiers. The Arakan Army admitted that the two soldiers were executed by its members on 7 February 2024 in Kyauktaw Township, and was caused by them desiring revenge on the junta soldiers for their war crimes.

The Arakan Army on 7 February 2025 began shelling the junta's positions in Sittwe in response to its artillery attacks, which it had been carrying out since December 2024 on areas held by the group. The group relaunched its assault on the Danyawaddy naval base in the Kyaukphyu Township on 20 February, attacking the surrounding military outposts and a police battalion base. On 24 February, it was reported to have encircled all bases of the junta, which was accused of blocking the evacuation of residents from the Kyakhphyu Township. On 27 February, heavy clashes broke out between the Arakan Army and the junta in the Thabaung Township of Ayeyarwady Region.

By mid-March, the Arakan Army had advanced towards Sittwe, and was attacking the Min Gan naval base of the junta north of the city as well as Thone Soung village. In response, the junta reinforced the base and areas around Byaing Phyu village. The Arakan Army and its allies also begun attacking the Nayungyo junta base in Pandaung Township which defended a group of ordnance factories in Bago Region, capturing most of the ouposts surrounding the base. In late-March, the Arakan Army intensified its attacks on the Ayeyarwady Region, sparking clashes in Lemyethna, Thabaung and Yegyi townships.

The Three Brotherhood Alliance declared a unilateral ceasefire for a month on 1 April following the 2025 Myanmar earthquake, in order to allow relief and rescue operations. The junta also announced a ceasefire against opposition groups on the following day. Some fighting however continued while the Arakan Army captured the Nyaungyo strategic base in Bago Region on the same day. The junta continued bombing townships despite the ceasefire, carrying out 409 attacks on townships held by the Arakan Army between 2 and 22 April, according to the ULA.

Both the Three Brotherhood Alliance and the Myanmar junta later extended the ceasefire for a month in May 2025. The United League of Arakan banned men aged between 18 and 45, and women between 18 and 25, from leaving Rakhine State in late-May 2025 as the Arakan Army was conscripting residents of the state. On 26 May, the Arakan Army killed Brigadier General Kyaw Myo Aung, a strategist of the 11th Infantry Division, alongside an army captain near Kyaukphyu. The group also captured several junta positions defending a police battalion headquarters in the Pyaing Si Kay village of Kyaukphyu Township.

Both the Myanmar junta and the Three Brotherhood Alliance later extended the ceasefire till the end of June. The Arakan Army in early June however began besieging the air defense base on the Nat Yay Kan Mountain, the last position still in the hands of the junta on the Ann-Padan road, and also continued its assault on the Kyaukphyu Township, targeting outposts defending Police Battalion 32. More than 40,000 civilians were displaced in Kyaukphyu Township due to the battle.

After the expiration of the ceasefire, the conflict escalated in Kyaukphyu Township in July 2025, with the Arakan Army taking control of the road connecting Kyaukphyu town to Danyawaddy naval base by mid-July. Clashes re-erupted in the Ngathaingchaung Subtownship of the Ayeyarwady Region in early-August 2025, after being paused since June, in addition to clashes breaking out near Set Set Yo Village and Lemyethna Township. The Myanmar junta later launched a nationwide counteroffensive ahead of the general election scheduled later in the year, with junta forces trying to retake lost areas in Ayeyarwady Region and trying to advance into Rakhine along the Ann-Padan road. The Arakan Army however managed to repel their attack.

The Arakan Army on 28 September captured the Gokkyi outpost, a critical supply base for the junta in the Magwe Region. In October 2025, the junta began fortifying Sittwe and areas along the road to Ponnagyun Township, causing the Arakan Army to pull back slightly in the township. On 10 November, the junta troops recaptured the Thaing Chaung Taung base in Kyaukphyu Township. Around 30 soldiers were killed on 15 November after an ambush by the Arakan Army in the Minpyin village.

=== 2026 ===
Following the completion of the process of the general election in the townships held by the junta in December 2025, the Arakan Army resumed its advance on Sittwe and Kyaukphyu in early January 2026. On 4 January, Colonel Han Lin Aung, chief of Military Operations Command No. 10, was killed alongside around ten soldiers during an ambush by the Arakan Army on a column of troops in Padaung Township.

The Arakan Army advanced to the outskirts of Sittwe by late-February 2026, clashing with the junta around Kyay Taw village as well as near its Regional Operations Command and the Shwe Min Gan naval base. By late-April 2026, the junta had increased the deployment of naval vessels in waters near southern Rakhine and patrols of UAVs over southern townships controlled by the Arakan Army. The retaking of the Kangyi village in Magwe Region from local resistance groups by the junta cut off an important trade route to Rakhine, further tightening the blockade of the state.

By early June, the Arakan Army had surrounded the Tatmadaw's naval bases in Sittwe and Kyuakphyu. Intense fighting was reported between the AA and the Tatmadaw's naval vessels positioned in the Bay of Bengal and along the Kaladan River southeast of Sittwe. Between May 29 and June 1, more than 40 junta soldiers were killed, including a captain. As a result, military troops retreated closer to the Taung Maw Oo naval base, which is supported by troops from 11th Light Infantry Division, and the Danyawaddy Naval Headquarters.

As the Arakan Army advanced further, the military regime escalated its airstrikes on civilian areas in July 2026. The town of Thandwe was impacted the most According to data compiled by The Irrawaddy, a total of 53 civilians were killed and 163 wounded over the months of July and August.

In September 2026, the junta launched Operation 4926 to recapture territory from the Arakan Army, launching attacks on the positions of the group around Ponnagyun-Sittwe border and the Kyaukphyu-Ramree border. The offensive however began faltering as regime troops began taking heavy losses and withdrawing. In October 2026, the regime forces attempted an unsuccessful push to retake Arakan Army's Nga Pyi island stronghold, while the group captured more military outposts in Sittwe.

== Humanitarian crisis ==
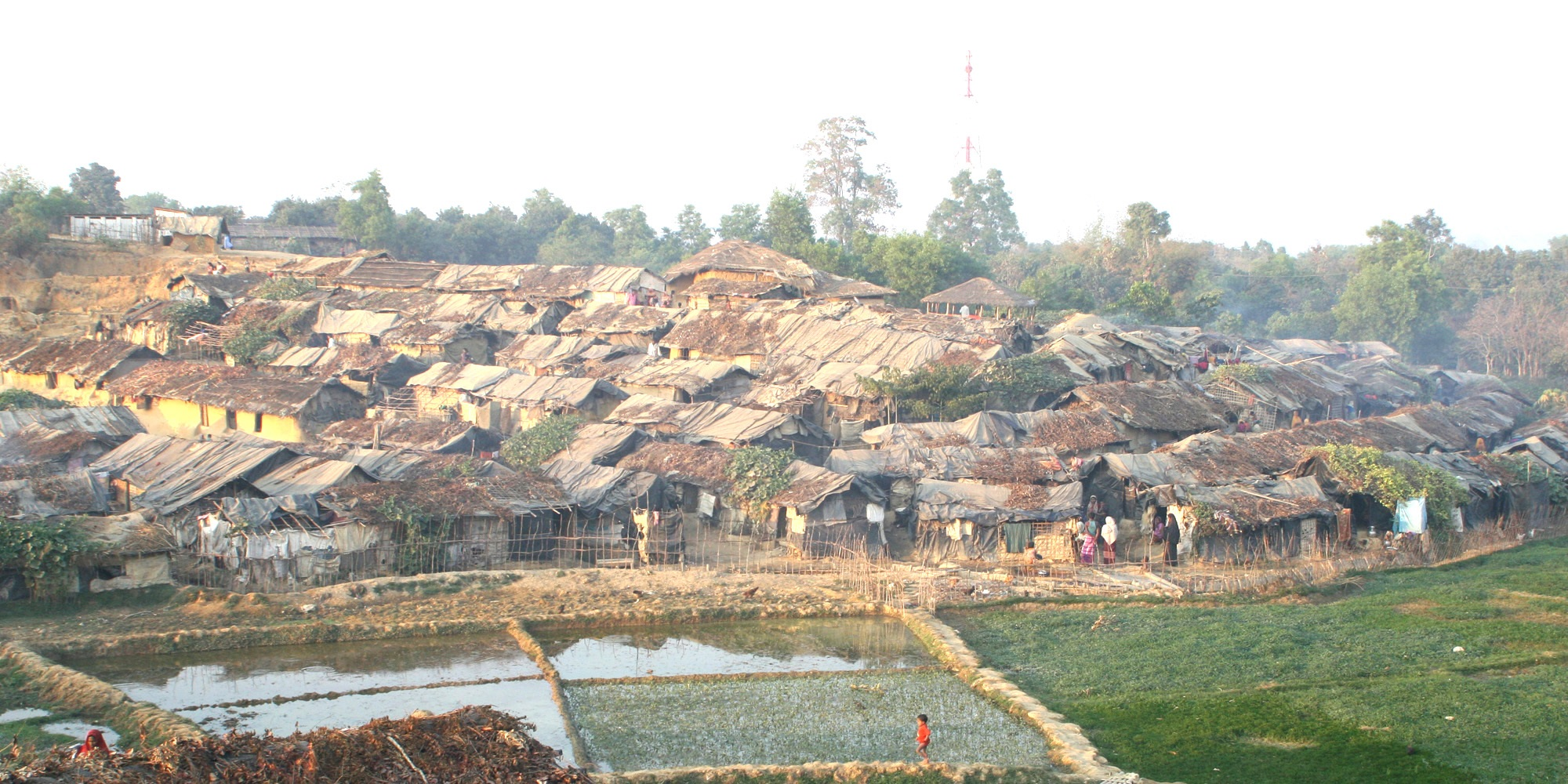
Kutupalong refugee camp in Bangladesh

4,000 non-Muslim villagers were evacuated by security forces in late-August amid ongoing clashes. According to estimates by Rohingya refugees living in Bangladesh, around 2,000 people crossed into Bangladesh. The number of displaced non-Muslims later rose to 30,000 in early-September. According to the United Nations, at least 270,000 Rohingya fled to Bangladesh in just two weeks following renewed violence that began on 25 August 2017. Prior to which, two refugee camps in Cox's Bazar in Bangladesh were already home to nearly 34,000 Rohingya refugees. Some 23,000 others remain internally displaced within Rakhine State. By late October 2017, around 200 had drowned while trying to cross into Bangladesh on boats since late-August.

In February 2017, the government of Bangladesh announced that it planned to relocate the new refugees and another 232,000 Rohingya refugees already in the country to Bhasan Char, a sedimentary island in the Bay of Bengal. The island first appeared around 2007, formed from washed down silt from the Meghna River. The nearest inhabited land, Hatiya Island is around 30 kilometres (19 mi) away. News agencies quoted a regional official describing the plan as "terrible". The move has received substantial opposition from a number of quarters. Human rights groups have described the plan as a forced relocation.

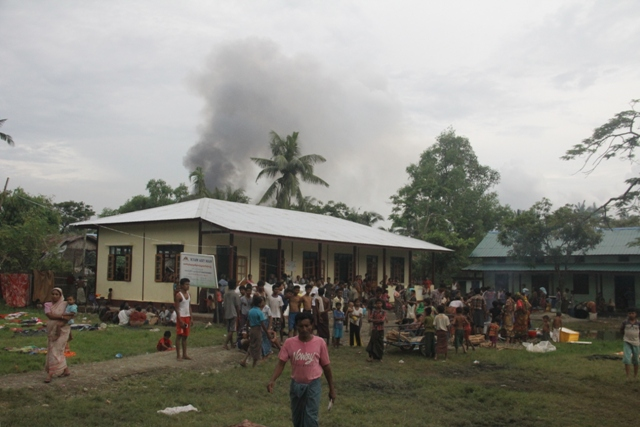
Displaced Hindu families at a makeshift camp in Maungdaw.

Hundreds of Hindus who complained of violence in their villages have also fled to Bangladesh. At least 3,000 of an estimated 8,000 Hindus living in Maungdaw, Buthidaung and Sittwe have fled since the start of military operations, some of whom were internally displaced, whilst others fled to Bangladesh. More than 500 Hindus returned to Maungdaw from Sittwe in December 2017.

From 25 August 2017, when the Tatmadaw (Myanmar Armed Forces) launched a military operation in response to attacks by Rohingya insurgents, to 22 September 2017, satellite images showed that Rohingya villages were still being burned and an estimated 429,000 refugees had fled into Bangladesh (creating a larger weekly outflow of refugees than the Rwandan genocide), out of a pre-violence Rohingya population of about 1 million in Rakhine state.

On 5 October 2017, the Bangladeshi Minister of Disaster Management and Relief Mofazzal Hossain Chowdhury Maya announced that the world's largest refugee camp would be built to house Rohingya refugees. Rohingyas settled across the border in 23 camps were to be transferred to one central camp in Cox's Bazar, with all the other camps being closed after the completion of the transfer. By the end of October 2017, the UN estimated that over 600,000 refugees had fled to Bangladesh since armed clashes resumed two months earlier. Bangladesh approved a plan on 28 November 2017 to temporarily shelter 100,000 Rohingya on the island.

Around 13,000 Rohingyas fled Myanmar from January to September 2018 according to the United Nations Human Rights Council (UNHCR). In 2018 Myanmar began closing IDP camps for Rohingyas and constructing permanent buildings of refuge in their place. The Rohingyas' movement, however, remained restricted. Aid workers and IDPs stated that even those with national verification cards had their movement restricted. Bangladesh's Minister for Disaster Management Md. Enamur Rahaman said on 26 February 2020 that the country had shelved plans to move the Rohingyas to Bhashan Char. Afzalul Haque, director of Bangladesh Navy's intelligence unit, told BenarNews in May that all Rohingyas arriving on boats from now on will be moved to the island. Bangladesh began transferring Rohingyas from Cox's Bazar to Bhashan Char on 4 December, with the first batch of 1,600 refugees being transported by boat. Aid organisations and refugees have accused the Bangladeshi government of forcing some of the refugees to go.

About 5,000 civilians in Rakhine State were forced to flee fighting between the Arakan Army and Tatmadaw from early December 2018 to mid-January 2019, per the United Nations. This number had swelled to more than 20,000 by the start of April 2019. About 10,000 were displaced from Minbya Township alone from late July to late August. According to statistics collected by a local NGO, the Rakhine Ethnic Congress, the number of IDPs displaced by fighting between the Tatmadaw and Arakan Army had reached 160,000 by January 2020. It was estimated that 40,000 people had been internally displaced in the last week of June amid reignited clashes. The OCHA estimated that 86,383 had been displaced as of 5 August.

The Rakhine Ethnic Congress stated that the number of internally displaced people due to the fighting between the Tatmadaw and Arakan Army reached 234,915 by early November 2020, when the ceasefire between both sides took effect. More than 78,000 people fled resumed fighting between both sides in Rakhine and Chin states since March 2022 according to the UN Office for the Coordination of Humanitarian Affairs (UNOCHA).

The UNHCR stated on 4 March 2024 that 350,900 people had been displaced amidst resumed clashes between the Arakan Army and the Tatmadaw since November 2023. In May 2024, it estimated that 45,000 Rohingyas had fled towards Bangladesh due to clashes in Buthidaung and Maungdaw Townships. An estimated 60,000 Rohingyas fled to Bangladesh in November and December 2024 amidst the intense clashes between the Myanmar junta and the Arakan Army according to Md. Touhid Hossain, Adviser for Foreign Affairs of Bangladesh.

=== Repatriation ===
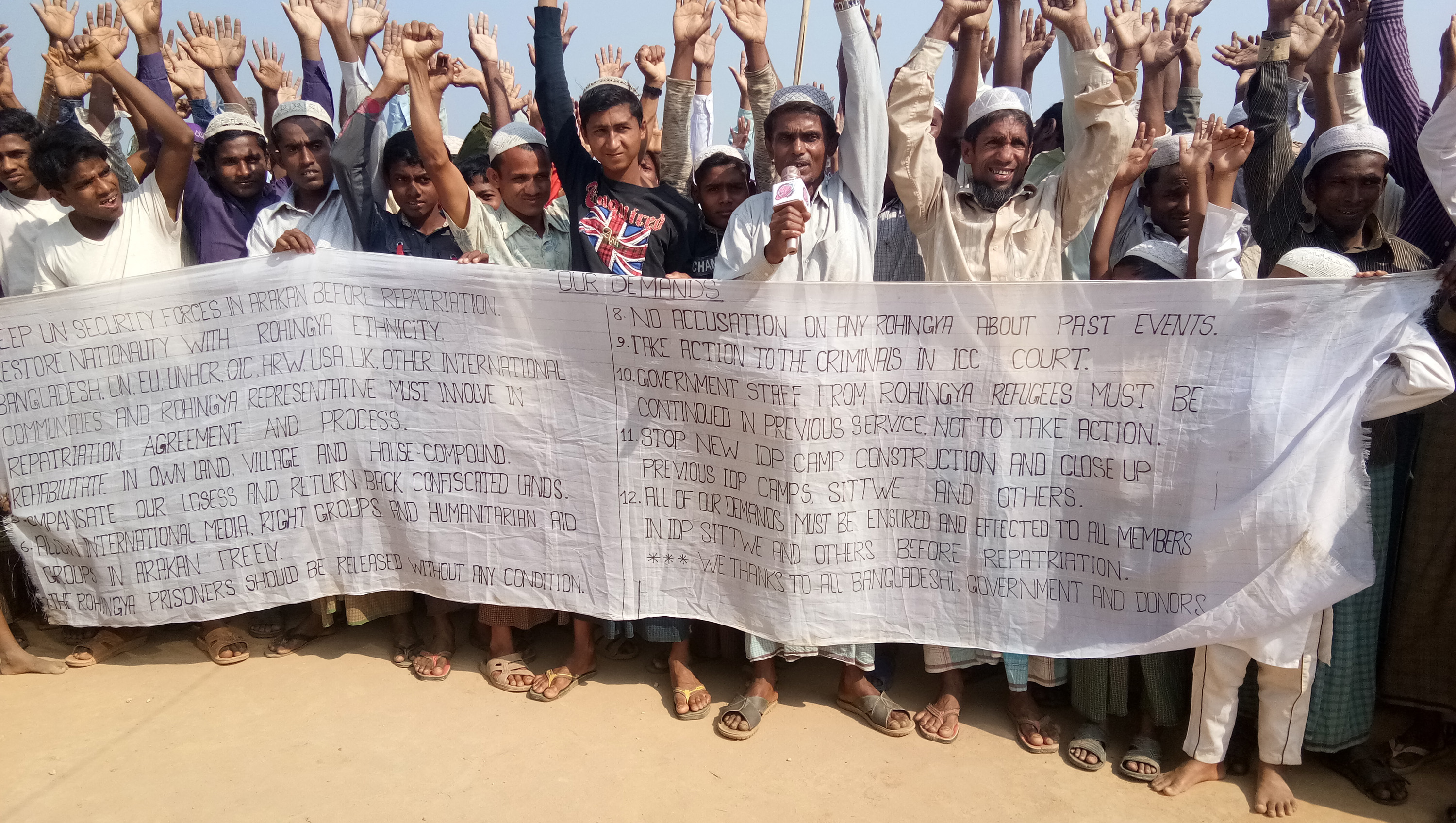
Rohingya refugees in Cox's Bazar, Bangladesh, protesting against what they view as a dangerous repatriation to Myanmar.

Bangladeshi Foreign Minister Abul Hassan Mahmud Ali met with Myanmar officials on 2 October 2017, later stating after their meeting that both countries had agreed on a "joint working group" for the repatriation of Rohingya refugees who had fled to Bangladesh.

The governments of Myanmar and Bangladesh signed a memorandum of understanding on 23 November 2017 regarding the repatriation of Rohingya refugees to Rakhine State. Bangladesh's Foreign Minister stated that a joint working group composed of UNHCR and members of both nations was to be established within three weeks to fix the final terms for the beginning of the process. He also stated that those returning would be kept in temporary camps near their abandoned homes. Under the deal, Myanmar would ensure that they are not kept in the camps for long and are issued identity cards. The foreign secretaries of both nations met on 19 December to finalise the agreement. Bangladesh's foreign ministry issued a statement saying that the group would "ensure commencement of repatriation within two months" by developing a timetable for verification of identities and logistics.

Bangladesh's foreign ministry announced on 15 January 2018 that their government and Myanmar's had bilaterally agreed on a repatriation deal for Rohingya refugees in Bangladesh, which would aim to complete the process of repatriation within two years. Win Myat Aye, Myanmar's Minister for Social Welfare, Relief and Resettlement, also announced that his country would begin repatriating Rohingya refugees beginning on 23 January 2018. Originally, the government of Myanmar agreed to repatriate only 374 Rohingya refugees out of a list of over 8,000 submitted by their Bangladeshi counterparts on 14 March 2018, citing incomplete paperwork as the reason for the slow process, but four days later they announced that a total of 1,100 "verified" Rohingyas from the list would be repatriated.

On 6 June 2018, the United Nations and the government of Myanmar signed a memorandum of understanding regarding the repatriation of Rohingya refugees, the details of which were kept secret until they were leaked online on 29 June 2018. The agreement was immediately criticised and rejected by Rohingya leaders, who say it does not address the concerns of their community. In a September 2018 interview with Reuters, Bangladeshi Prime Minister Sheikh Hasina accused Myanmar of fabricating excuses to avoid repatriating the Rohingya. She also said the Rohingya would not be allowed to stay permanently in Bangladesh. The two countries agreed to begin repatriation from mid-November. However, most Rohingyas believed it was not safe to return and refused to be repatriated, demanding accountability for abuses against them and guarantees of citizenship. Meanwhile, 624 Rohingyas had returned to Myanmar independently by February 2020.

Bangladesh's foreign secretary Shahidul Haque told the United Nations Security Council on 28 February 2019 that no Rohingya refugee had agreed to return to Myanmar due to the non-guarantee of a safe and conducive environment. He also said that Bangladesh could not take in any more refugees. After the coup in Myanmar in February 2021, Chairman of the State Administration Council Min Aung Hlaing said that the repatriation would continue. Later in May 2021, however, he stated that the country would not take Rohingyas back if their repatriation did not meet the legal requirements, and termed them as foreigners. The National Unity Government of Myanmar, which was formed in opposition to the State Administration Council, promised to repatriate and grant citizenship to the Rohingyas if it came to power.

== Human rights violations ==
A 20-page report by United Nations' investigators stated Tatmadaw was responsible for a genocidal campaign against the Rohingya which included mass-murder, sex slavery, kidnappings, deportations and gang rapes. It also blamed the civilian government for helping the military by destroying documents implicating the Tatmadaw, allowing hate speech and not protecting civilians from human rights abuses. The generals named by the report for orchestrating the genocide included Myanmar's commander-in-chief Min Aung Hlaing, deputy Commander-in-Chief Soe Win, Lt. Gen. Aung Kyaw Zaw, Major General Maung Maung Soe, and Brigadier-General Than Oo. It also accused ARSA of committing human right abuses. The UN stated in April 2019 that both the military and the Arakan Army were committing abuses upon civilians since the start of their conflict.

Myanmar appointed a panel to investigate the alleged abuses in July 2018. It consisted of two non-Burmese members – Rosario Manalo, Kenzo Oshima, as well as two Burmese members – Aung Tun Thet and the lawyer Mya Thein. It submitted a report to the government on 20 January 2020 and stated that though war crimes as well as abuses had taken place, there was no evidence that the military tried to commit a genocide of the Rohingyas. In addition, it stated that nearly 1,000 people were killed during the clashes and the Tatmadaw committed massacres in four villages.

The National Unity Government of Myanmar, formed in opposition to the State Administration Council military junta which seized power during the 2021 Myanmar coup d'état, recognized that the military had been involved in mass killings and sexual violence against the Rohingya on 24 August 2021, calling for justice to be delivered to victims.

The Arakan Army has also been accused by the Human Rights Watch of perpetrating severe human rights abuses on the Rohingya akin to that of the Tatmadaw, including restrictions on movement, robbery, arbitrary detention, mistreatment, forced labour and forced recruitment.

=== Killings of civilians ===
The Burmese government and Rohingya advocates have both accused the other side of killing civilians. Advocates for the Rohingyas have claimed that many civilians have died in military attacks on villages. The government has accused ARSA of killing civilians, including Hindus and Muslims, some of whom were suspected by ARSA of being government informants. ARSA in a statement has dismissed government allegations against it as baseless, seeking to present its cause as a defence of Rohingya rights.

Bangladesh's Foreign Minister Abul Hassan Mahmud Ali has stated that Myanmar's security forces have killed over 3,000 Rohingyas during the 2017 clashes. Myanmar officials meanwhile have stated that 163 people have been killed and 91 have gone missing in ARSA attacks since 2016. A Médecins Sans Frontières survey published in December 2017 reported that 6,700 Rohingyas had been killed by shooting and other violence between 25 August and 24 September. The report was based on interviews in late October and early November with refugees regarding questions on numbers and conditions of deaths of their family members.

Some members of the Hindu community have also fled to Bangladesh, with some blaming soldiers and others blaming Buddhist vigilantes for violence against them while others have accused Rohingya insurgents of attacking them on suspicion of being government spies. Some of the Hindus who migrated to Bangladesh stated that their villages are also experiencing killings, torture and arson attacks like those of Rohingyas. 86 Hindus were killed by unidentified men in Myanmar according to the refugees and Rana Dasgupta, head of the Bangladesh Hindu Buddhist Christian Unity Council.

According to the Rakhine Ethnic Congress, 342 civilians were killed and 740 injured during the fighting between the Arakan Army and the Tatmadaw from 2018 to 2020. In addition, 33 civilians were killed and 67 wounded due to landmines left behind as a result of the conflict. The United League of Arakan accused the Tatmadaw of killing 179 civilians and wounding 468 during clashes with its armed front, the Arakan Army, from 13 November 2023 to 21 March 2024.

==== Accusations against Arakan Army ====
The Arakan Army was accused of killing civilians and beheading Rohingyas after capturing the town of Buthidaung in May 2024. The group later rejected the accusations as baseless. At least 150 Rohingyas were killed on 5 August 2024 due to shelling and drone attacks while trying to flee towards Bangladesh due to clashes in the town of Maungdaw. The survivors, as well as Rohingya activists and the Myanmar government blamed the Arakan Army, which denied the accusations.

Nay San Lwin, co-founder of Free Rohingya Coalition, in January 2025 alleged that the Arakan Army had killed at least 2,500 Rohingyas and forced around 40,000 to flee Myanmar between March and August 2024. The NGO Fortify Rights also accused the group of killing civilians and captured junta soldiers later in the same month.

The Arakan Rohingya National Council on 3 August accused the Arakan Army of massacring over 600 people in Htan Shauk Kham village of Buthidaung Township. The group however denied the claim.

==== Accusations against Myanmar's security forces ====
The Border Guards Bangladesh station chief of the Ghumdum border post in Bangladesh accused Myanmar's military of firing on fleeing Rohingyas on 26 August 2017. An Agence France-Presse reporter counted more than a dozen mortar shells and several heavy machine gun rounds fired by Burmese security forces on fleeing Rohingyas.

Reports of mass killings of Rohingyas by the military and Buddhist vigilantes in Chut Pyin village near Rathedaung emerged in September 2017. Chris Lewa stated that they had received reports of 130 people being killed in the village. A video provided to ABC News by a human rights monitor purportedly showed the village burning and in another clip of freshly dug earth mound, allegedly graves of those killed.

In interviews with The Guardian in the same month, Rohingya villagers of Tula Toli accused Myanmar's armed forces of sweeping through the village and murdering scores of people. Human Rights Watch in December 2017 accused the military of killing several hundred villagers of Tula Toli and burning the bodies of victims in pits to destroy evidence. The report was partly based on interviews with 18 people. HRW also accessed images detailing complete destruction of Tula Toli and nearby Dual Toli while neighbouring non-Muslim villages were unharmed.

In interviews with Human Rights Watch in October 2017, 14 villagers of Muang Nu and surrounding villages in the Chin Tha Mar village area blamed Myanmar's army of beating, sexually assaulting and killing Rohingya villagers seeking safety in a residential compound on 27 August. Satellite imagery accessed by the group showed near total destruction of Muang Nu and Hpaung Taw Pyin village. Though the group was not able to verify the death toll, some interviewees stated there were 100 or more bodies.

Myanmar's army discovered a mass-grave containing 10 unidentified bodies in Inn Din village, located 50 kilometres (31 mi) north of Rakhine's capital Sittwe on 18 December. The army stated two days later that a senior officer had been appointed to investigate whether security forces were involved in their killing. Myanmar's commander-in-chief Min Aung Hlaing stated that a five-member team was involved in the investigation. The attacks on Rohingyas in the mixed village had been documented by Amnesty in August as well as burning of their homes.

The military issued details of the investigation team's findings on 10 January 2018, stating that some of the soldiers were involved in extrajudicial killings of 10 Rohingya, who were among the 200 involved in attacking Buddhist villagers and security forces in Inn Din. The statement added that the ten who were arrested, were killed instead of being handed over to the police. It added that action would be taken against ethnic Rakhine villagers and soldiers involved. AFP meanwhile reported that Rohingya refugees from the village claimed that those killed were civilians and not terrorists. ARSA on 13 January denied that the Rohingyas who were killed were associated with them, claiming they were innocent civilians. Seven soldiers involved in the killings were sentenced to 10-year prison terms with hard labour.

The Associated Press reported on 1 February 2018 that five mass graves of Rohingya civilians had been found around the village of Gu Dar Pyin, and based on the testimonies of survivors and time-stamped cellphone videos, the report claimed they were victims of the Gu Dar Pyin massacre. However, the government of Myanmar denied the report, stating only "terrorists" were killed in self-defense and "carefully buried" by soldiers.

On 22 March 2019, seven civilians were killed in shelling on Buthidaung township's Si Taung Gyi village blamed on the Tatmadaw by the villagers as well as the Arakan Army. Six Rohingya Muslims who were collecting bamboo, were killed and 13 injured upon being fired by a helicopter on 3 April in a village of Bathidaung township according to a local resident and Maungdaw Township's MP. The Tatmadaw, however, claimed that they were affiliates of the Arakan Army whom they were hunting down after being notified about their presence in the area, while nine insurgents were injured. Two Rakhine villagers from Pyi Taw Thar of Minbya Township were killed on 23 April 2020. A victim's brother claimed they were shot dead by the military without provocation, however, a Tatmadaw spokesman accused them of being Arakan Army insurgents who refused to stop for checking.

Six civilians were shot dead and eight injured in Kyauk Tan village of Rathedaung Township on 2 May at a school where 275 men had been detained over alleged links with Arakan Army. The military claimed that they had tried to attack them, however, this account was disputed by local politicians and witnesses who claimed that the firing was unprovoked. Firing between Myauk Taung and Marlar Taung villages of Kyauktaw Township on 19 May in revenge for a mine attack on a military convoy, left a civilian dead according to the villagers. Two others were injured in Marlar Taung village due to shelling. Residents of Minbya Township's Pan Myaung village also accused the army of killing three civilians and injuring four in shelling on 25 August despite there being no insurgents present there.

The official website of Tatmadaw on 31 August announced investigation into the conduct of soldiers at Gu Dar Pyin saying they disregarded instructions. It stated in November that court-martial proceedings had begun against soldiers who were involved in "accidents". In February 2020 it announced opening of investigations into the alleged massacres in Muang Nu and Chut Pyin villages. Three officers were announced on 30 June to have been convicted for their actions at Gu Dar Pyin, though their crimes were not revealed to the public.

In September 2020, video testimony of two former soldiers, who stated that they had deserted, taken by the Arakan Army was published online. The two claimed that they were involved in killing of more than 150 Rohingyas along with their battalions in Buthidaung and Muangdaw Townships in August 2017. The two later fled to Bangladesh in August 2020 and were transferred to The Hague.

Shelling by the army on 2 December killed three civilians and injured six according to residents and an MP of Mrauk U. Four Rohingya children were killed in Htaikhtoo Pauk village of Buthidaung Township, with five others being injured along with their teacher on 7 January 2020. Both the military and Arakan Army accused each other of planting the mine.

Three civilians were killed and 30 injured in villages of Mrauk U and Kyauktaw townships due to attacks on 13 March blamed on the army by their residents. The villagers stated that the attacks came in reprisal due to an ambush by the Arakan Army. On 1 April, five civilians were killed and seen injured in attacks blamed on the military by some residents.

18 villagers were abducted from the villages of Tin Ma Thit and Tin Ma Gyi in Kyauktaw Township by the Tatmadaw on 16 March, for aiding the Arakan Army, according to eyewitnesses. The body of one of the villagers was found the next day with bullet wounds. The police agreed to take up their case in December 2020, after their families demanded to know what had happened to the others for over nine months.

Eight civilians were killed by shelling on the Kyauk Seik village of Ponnagyun Township on 13 April, blamed on the military by both the villagers and the Arakan Army. Villagers of Kyauktaw Township accused the Tatmadaw of killing a civilian and injuring 13 others in shooting while targeting rebels on 16 April.

A driver working for the World Health Organization was killed in a mine attack while a government health worker was injured in an attack on their vehicle on 20 April; the military and Arakan Army blamed each other for the incidents. Four civilians were killed in Paletwa Township on 22 April due to shelling. The Tatmadaw blamed the Arakan Army, while the group blamed the military. Witnesses also reported that the Tatmadaw killed four people in Minbya Township. The military claimed that two of them were Arakan Army members who were shot while trying to flee.

A mine blast killed 2 Rohingya children and wounded another on 13 May, with both the Arakan Army and Tatmadaw accusing each other. Eyewitnesses reported deaths of two villagers and injury to three others in the army's attack on Chein Hkali village of Rathedaung township during the clashes the lasted from 12 to 13 July. Rakhine Ethnic Congress' secretary Zaw Zaw Tun said that over 180 people had been killed since the start of clashes with AA. According to Radio Free Asia in August 2020, 274 had been killed.

Tatmadaw was accused of killing two civilians of Kyauktaw township during 26–27 August. A man was shot dead in Shan Ywa village on 26 August and the next day in Apaukaw village, a woman was killed while two others injured in shelling, according to their relatives. Amnesty International said on 12 October that it had received reports of two men being killed after being detained in Hpa Yar Paung village in Kyauktaw Township on 3 September and images of MM2 landmines, regularly used by Tatmadaw, being planted in civilian areas. Four people were killed and 10 injured due to a shell landing in Nyaung Khet Kan village of Myebon Township on 8 September. Pyithu Hluttaw lawmaker Pe Than accused Tatmadaw of being behind the attack.

Residents of Pyin Shae village of Buthidaung Township accused the Tatmadaw of recruiting 15 villagers, including children, to guide them through an area mined by the Arakan Army on 5 October. Two Rohingya children were killed after the insurgents ambushed the group according to the villagers. The Tatmadaw denied any involvement and blamed the Arakan Army, which in turn claimed that there was no clash in the village and that the military must have killed them. In Minbya Township, three Rohingya men were later killed by the Tatmadaw. The military claimed that they were violating the nighttime curfew and had not stopped their boat when asked to, though the residents stated that the shooting occurred around 10 a.m.

A boat hired by the International Committee of the Red Cross was struck by the Myanmar Navy while travelling on the Mayu river between Pyin Win and Kan Pyin villages of Rathedaung Township on 28 October, killing one person and injuring two others per witnesses.

Two children were killed by the Tatmadaw on 2 August 2022 when it fired on the boat transporting them across the Kaladan River to Toe Ma Wa village in Paletwa Township. On 28 August, three civilians were killed due to shelling by the Tatmadaw hitting Kin Seik village in Mrauk-U Township. Four civilians were killed from shelling in Minbya and Kyauktaw townships on 17 October. Three children were killed in Hakha Township in Chin state and Rathedaung Township in Rakhine on 19 October due to shelling by the military. A family of three was killed when the Tatmadaw shelled Pisi village in Kyauktaw Township on 31 October.

Eight civilians were killed in Sin Ingyi village of Ponnagyun Township by the Tatmadaw on 10 November according to the residents, who also stated that the troops set some houses on fire. On 16 November, at least 17 civilians were killed due to the Tatmadaw shelling the Jeitchaung village in Maungdaw Township and the Chaungtu village in Kyauktaw Township.

Four civilians were killed in Mrauk U and Kyauktaw townships on 13 November 2023 and ten were wounded by the Tatmadaw according to other villagers, while ten were killed by it after it attacked Pauktaw Township on 16 November. Shelling by the Tatmadaw killed three civilians and wounded six in Mrauk-U Township on 24 December according to the Three Brotherhood Alliance. The township's residents accused the junta of killing six civilians sheltering in the Hpayar Paw IDP camp on 28 December.

The Arakan Army accused the Light Infantry Battalion 540 of killing four civilian in Mrauk-U Township on 9 January 2024 after clashes with the group. Residents of Apauk Wa village in Kyauktaw Township also accused the Light Infantry Battalion 539 of killing two residents. Six civilians were killed by shelling and airstrikes in Thayet Tapin and Weygyi Dunk villages of Kyauktaw Township according to the Arakan Army, while Lint Zin Ywar Thit village of the same township accused the junta of killing six civilians by shelling. Junta soldiers and policemen held captive by the Arakan Army stated that they had executed nine civilians in Mrauk-U and Minbya townships in January 2024. Shelling by the Tatmadaw on a market in Sittwe left twelve people dead and eighteen wounded on 29 February.

23 Rohingyas were killed and 30 were wounded on 15 March in an airstrike on Thar Dar village in Minbya Township according to residents. Five civilians were killed and thirteen wounded due to airstrikes on Lay Hnin Taung village in Mrauk-U Township on 22 March according to residents. Residents accused the junta of killing nine civilians in Lin Thi village of Thandwe Township, while also killing four civilians and wounding seven others in Kin Chaung village of Maungdaw Township on 14 May. More than ten civilians were killed in Yeazin village of Thandwe Township by the junta on the same day. The Arakan Army accused it of killing civilians and wounding around twenty in Wae Gyi Dauk village of Kyauktaw Township on the foowing day. Nine civilians were killed in Nat Taung Maw village of Thandwe Township on 18 May according to residents.

The Arakan Army accused the junta forces of massacring at least 76 civilians in Byine Phyu village of Sittwe Township on 30 May 2024. Zaw Min Tun stated that the Tatmadaw killed three people who tried to snatch a gun from an officer, but denied that there had been any mass killings. Locals and the National Unity Government meanwhile alleged that the Tatmadaw killed at least 50 civilians. The residents also alleged that those bearing tattoos of the Arakan Army had the skin cut and burnt by the troops, while also forcing some detained men in the village to drink their urine. The Tatmadaw also began attacking the Singaung village in Thandwe Township on 4 June over links to the Arakan Army, killing around ten civilians and injuring as much as 30 others. Six civilians were killed due to attacks by the Tatmadaw on villages of Taungup Township from 15 to 18 June.

Some employees of the General Administration Department were killed by the junta troops in mid-August 2024 while fleeing the Arakan's Army assault on the town of Kyeintali. An airstrike carried out by the Myanmar Air Force struck a church in Kyeintali on 15 August killed eleven civilians and wounded eleven others. On 8 September, airstrikes by the Tatmadaw on an Arakan Army medical center for captured junta troops and other inmates in the Shin village of Pauktaw Township, killing 17 people. Airtrikes by the Tatmadaw on Border Guard Police Battalion No. 2 base near Maungdaw on the following day killed over 50 people, including captured junta troops. At least seventeen people were killed in Tan Hlwe Ywar Ma town of Taungup Township due to airstrikes carried out by the Myanmar Air Force on 8 October. The United League of Arakan in mid-November 2024 accused the junta of having killed 735 Rakhine civilians and wounded 1,569 since the beginning of the year.

At least 40 civilians were killed and at least 20 others were wounded due to airstrikes on 8 January 2025 by the Myanmar Air Force on Kyauk Ni Maw village of Ramree Township. On 11 January, around a dozen people were killed in airstrikes on the town of Kyauktaw. 28 women and children were killed and 25 others injured in airstrikes on an Arakan Army detention centre in Mrauk-U Township holding family members of Tatmadaw soldiers on 18 January. An airstrike by the junta on the Tun Yawai Village in Rathedaung Township on 13 May killed 13 civilians and wounded 20 others.

An airstrike by the Tatmadaw on 25 August killed 12 people in Mrauk U. 22 people were killed due to airstrikes in Thayet Thapin village of Kyauktaw Township on 12 September. On 30 October, eight civilians were killed and 22 others wounded in Rakhine state due to attacke by the Tatmadaw, while four civilians were killed in Pan Nilar village of Ponnagyun Township. Three civilians were killed and at least five others were wounded in Taungngu village of Kyaukphyu Township due to bombing by the Tatmadaw.

At least 34 people were killed and many more were injured after the Tatmadaw's airstrikes on a hospital in Mrauk-U on 10 December. On 11 December, bombing by the Tatmadaw on two villages of the Kyaukphyu Township killed eight civilians and wounded ten others according to the Arakan Army. The group also stated that attacks by the junta had killed 1,152 civilians and wounded 2,153 since November 2023.

On 20 January 2026, 21 captured Tatmadaw soldiers and their relatives were killed in airstrikes carried out by the junta on a prison run by the Arakan Army in the Chaung Tu village located between Kyauktaw and Ponnagyun townships. Twenty civilians were killed due to airstrikes on the Yoe Ngu village in Ponnagyun Township on 24 February. Airstrikes on an Arakan Army detention centre in Daletchaung area of Ann Township on 8 March killed 116 prisoners of war and a number of detained civilians, in addition to injuring 32 people. Airstrikes on Kyauktaw by the junta on 17 June killed eight civilians and wounded seventeen others.

On 19 July, five civilians were killed and wounded 26 in airstrikes on Taungup and Thandwe townships. Airstrikes on Thandwe on 24 July resulted in deaths of three civilians and injuries to 21 others. Another fourteen civilians were killed and over a dozen wounded on 10 August due to regime airstrikes.

During interviews conducted by the Arakan Army, two Tatmadaw POWs captured after 16 September stated that superior officers ordered them to kill ethnic Rakhine people and rustle their livestock. An airstrike by the Myanmar military in Kyauktaw on 28 September killed around 50 people and wounded 58 others.

==== Accusations against ARSA ====
The Myanmar government claimed in a statement that ARSA killed four Muslims, including a village head and a government informant, on 25 August 2017. The next day on 26 August, another Muslim village head and a Hindu child were allegedly killed when ARSA insurgents fired at a monastery. In addition, six Hindus were stated to have been killed when the insurgents attacked a Hindu family. The Office of Myanmar's State Counsellor also blamed ARSA for the killings of five Daingnets on 26 August and seven Mro people on 31 August.

The mass-graves of 28 Hindus were found by Myanmar's security forces on 24 September 2017 near the village of Ye Baw Kya, with 17 more bodies found on the next day. Three relatives of the deceased said that masked men marched 100 Hindus away from the village before slitting their throats and pushing them into a hole. The relatives recognised some of the attackers as Rohingya Muslims, who told their victims they should not be in possession of official identity cards, which were issued by the government to Hindus but not to Muslims. After the discovery of the bodies, the Myanmar government claimed the victims were killed by ARSA insurgents. An ARSA spokesman denied the allegation that it was behind the killings and accused Buddhist nationalists of spreading lies to divide Hindus and Muslims.

On 9 November 2017, Myint Khyine, the secretary of the Immigration and Population Department, blamed the deaths of 18 village leaders in the past three months in Maungdaw and Buthidaung, on ARSA. The village leaders helped the department to issue national verification cards to Rohingya villagers.

On 22 May 2018, Amnesty International released a report based on accounts of witnesses and survivors claiming it had evidence that ARSA rounded up and killed as many as 99 Hindu civilians (53 in Kha Maung Seik and 46 in Ye Bauk Kyar) on 25 August 2017, the same day that ARSA launched a massive attack against Myanmar's security forces. 45 of the victims were found in a mass grave in September 2017.

Rohingya refugees and Tom Andrews, a special rapporteur for the UN, have accused ARSA of being behind killings and intimidation of other refugees in the camps in Bangladesh. Bangladesh's authorities have however denied the group's presence.

=== Arson ===
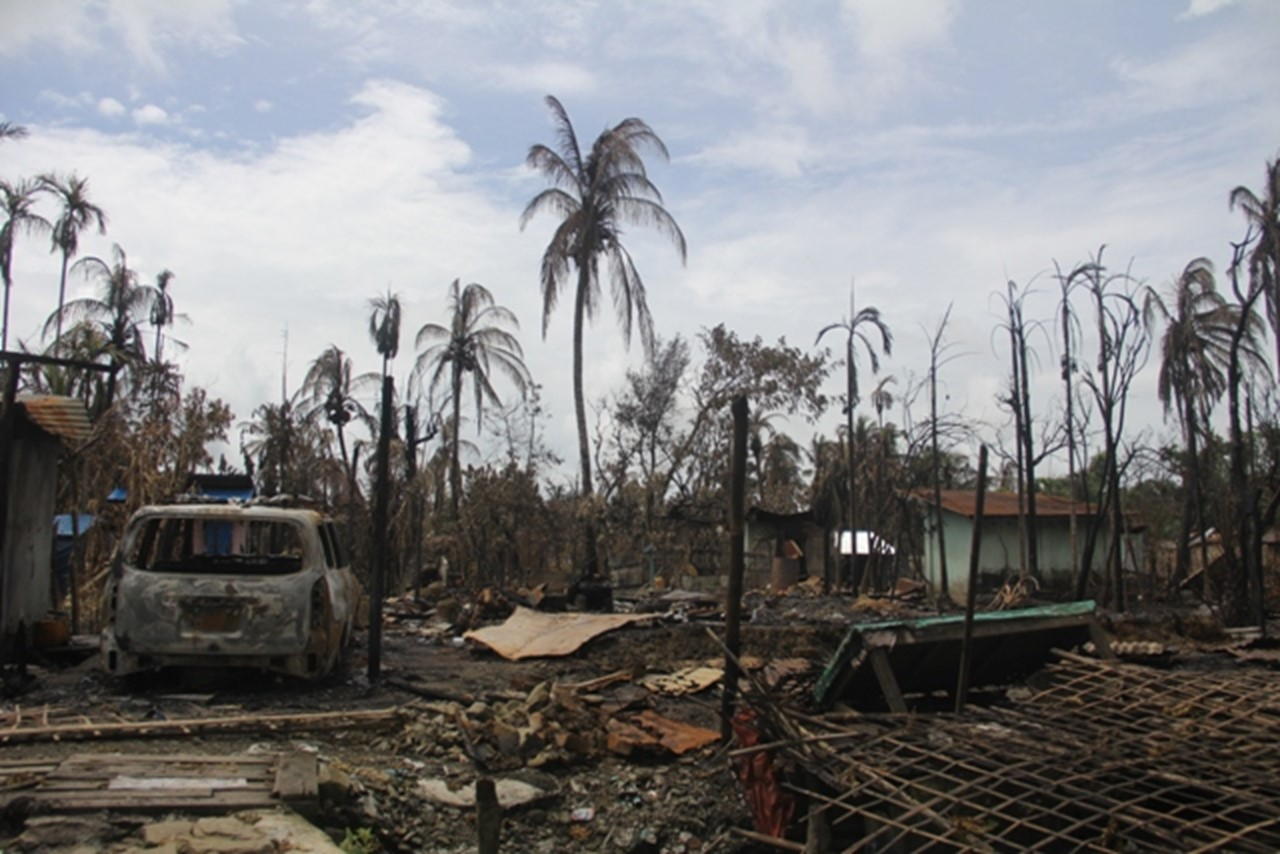
A burnt down house in a Rohingya village in northern Rakhine State.

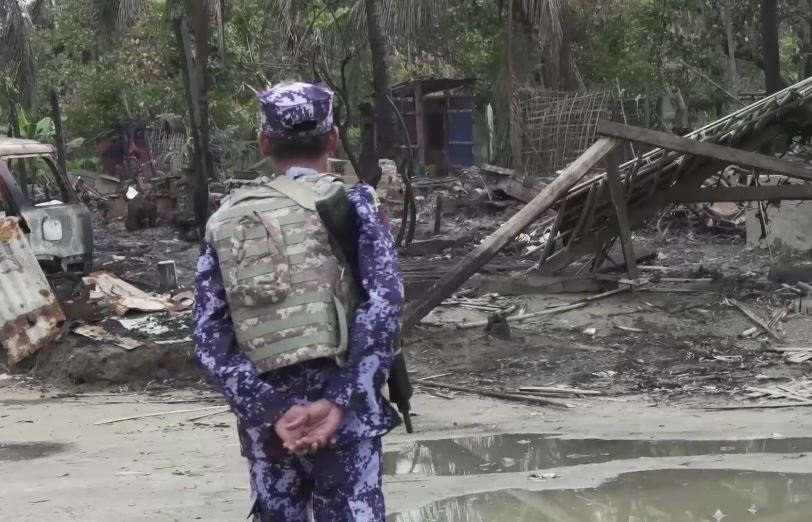
A member of Myanmar's Border Guard Police inspects a house burnt down in an arson attack.

ARSA has been accused by the State Counsellor's office of committing arson on Buddhist monasteries and local police outposts, killing innocent civilians and planting landmines. ARSA has meanwhile accused the Myanmar Army of using civilians as human shields.

A number of Rohingya properties were set alight during the violence, with residents blaming security forces while the government blamed Rohingya insurgents, suggesting that they had burnt down their own community's property. According to the State Counsellor's office, insurgents had burnt down 88 homes, more than 100 shops, two mosques and eight religious schools, as well as vehicles in a village.

Human Rights Watch in August 2017 said that satellite images showed widespread burning in 10 areas in northern Rakhine. While the causes of the fires could not be determined, the group said that it "compared the locations of these fires with witness statements it has collected and media reports, and found a correlation with some reported incidents where residences have allegedly been deliberately burned."

Chris Lewa, the director of The Arakan Project, has accused Myanmar's security forces of burning village after village in a systematic way while also blaming Rohingya arsonists of burning the Buddhist village of Pyu Ma. Amnesty International's crisis response director Tirana Hassan said that evidence points to Myanmar security setting northern Rakhine ablaze. The group also stated that it has credible reports of Rohingya militants burning the homes of ethnic Rakhine and other minorities.

Human Rights Watch stated on 18 December that 354 villages had been completely or partially destroyed since the clashes that began in August.

Amnesty International released a report on 11 March 2018, documenting the bulldozing of intact structures in Rohingya villages and the removal of charred homes by security forces to make way for military bases.

The Tatmadaw has also been accused of deliberately torching ethnic Rakhine villages during their conflict with Arakan Army. These include Ooyinthar village of Buthidaung, Kyaukmaw Paik Seik village of Myebon and Amyet Taung in Rathedaung, whose destruction was blamed on the army by their residents. During a press conference held on 30 March 2020, residents of various villages accused the army of deliberately bombing and burning around 150 homes in mid-March.

On 26 May Human Rights Watch called for an unbiased investigation into the burning of 200 buildings in Let Kyar, a deserted ethnic Rakhine village located in Mrauk U Township, which occurred on 16 May. Villagers in nearby Bu Ywat Ma Nyo had stated they heard gunshots and witnessed the Tatmadaw entering the village around the time the buildings were burnt. The military had stated earlier that it came into conflict with Arakan Army insurgents and blamed them for burning the village, though the latter denied it. Witnesses alleged that the Tatmadaw burned down over 160 buildings of Hpayar Paung and Taung Pauk villages, located in Kyauktaw Township, on 3 September. Amnesty International on 12 October reported that fires had been detected in the villages remotely with satellite sensors and the evidence pointed at Tatmadaw.

The Buthidaung town was largely burnt, with Myanmar Team of the Office of the High Commissioner for Human Rights head James Rodehaver stating that they had received information that the arson began on 17 May, two days after the Arakan Army captured the town. The group however denied responsibility and blamed the Tatmadaw.

=== Rape ===
Myanmar security forces have reportedly raped Rohingya women during the violence. In February 2017, the UN's Human Rights Office published a report accused the army and police forces in Myanmar of committing gang rapes against Rohingya women. Systematic rape of Rohingya women has also been reported by Amnesty International, Human Rights Watch, and other NGOs. Reuters, IRIN, NPR, The Associated Press and the Myanmar Times have all published reports of rape. Myanmar denies that there is a systematic campaign of rape, though acknowledges it may have been committed by "individual members of the security forces".

Reports of rape began in October 2016. On 27 October, the Myanmar Times published an article reporting "dozens" of rapes in northern Rakhine state. The journalist who wrote that piece was later fired, allegedly due to government pressure. On 28 October, Reuters interviewed eight women who reported being raped by soldiers at gun point. In April 2017, National Public Radio interviewed 12 women from different villages who all reported rape. IRIN reported instances of rape in May 2017.

Members of Myanmar's armed forces have been accused of raping civilians before. In 2011, Aung San Suu Kyi herself said "In the areas of the ethnic nationalities, rape is rife. It is used as a weapon by armed forces to intimidate the ethnic nationalities." The United Nations' Committee on the Elimination of Discrimination against Women asked Myanmar on 28 November to provide reports on rapes, sexual violence and deaths of Rohingya women by their security forces and told them that action would be taken against the perpetrators.

United Nations Secretary General António Guterres released a report on 16 April 2018 regarding conflict-related sexual violence specifically perpetrated by the Tatmadaw (Myanmar Armed Forces). In a United Nations Security Council meeting, human rights activist Razia Sultana told a panel about the sexual violence in the conflict, based on research and interviews with Rohingyas she had conducted. Sultana claimed that there was evidence of soldiers raping more than 300 women and girls in 17 villages in Rakhine State. Hau Do Suan, Myanmar's representative to the United Nations, rejected the claims and stated that the report implicating the military was done based on unverified allegations.

In September 2020, the Tatmadaw launched criminal proceedings against three soldiers who had gang-raped a woman and attempted to rape her daughter in Ugar village of Rathedaung Township on 29 June. The Tatmadaw had previously denied the accusations as false on 2 July. All three were sentenced to 20 years in prison with hard labour in December.

=== Reactions ===
The military crackdown on Rohingya people drew criticism from various quarters. On 30 December 2016, nearly two dozen prominent human rights activists, including Malala Yousafzai, Archbishop Desmond Tutu and Richard Branson, called on the United Nations Security Council to intervene and end the "ethnic cleansing and crimes against humanity" being perpetrated in northern Rakhine State.

High officials from the United Nations, and international organisations such as the human rights group Amnesty International, have labelled the military crackdown on the Rohingya minority as "crimes against humanity" and "ethnic cleansing", adding that the military had made the civilians a target of "a systematic campaign of violence". Amnesty International's Regional Director for Southeast Asia and the Pacific, James Gomez, said on 19 October 2017: "Aung San Suu Kyi today demonstrated that she and her government are still burying their heads in the sand over the horrors unfolding in Rakhine State. At times, her speech amounted to little more than a mix of untruths and victim blaming."

In August 2017, a government-appointed commission rejected allegations of human rights violations and ethnic cleansing, calling them "exaggerations". In September 2017, Desmond Tutu wrote an open letter to Aung San Suu Kyi urging her "to speak out for justice, human rights and the unity of your people".

Nobel Laureates Malala and Bishop Tutu again appealed to Aung San Suu Kyi to intercede on behalf of the Rohingya, and on 6 September 2017 Pope Francis called for an end to "persecution" of the Rohingya. On 14 September, U.S. Secretary of State Rex Tillerson said, "I think it is important that the global community speak out in support of what we all know the expectation is for the treatment of people regardless of their ethnicity... This violence must stop, this persecution must stop." Prime Minister of the United Kingdom Theresa May's spokesman announced on 19 September that the country would stop training Myanmar's armed forces until the crisis was resolved.

Maung Maung Soe, who led the operations in Rakhine in 2017, was sanctioned by the United States according to the Treasury Department. It added that the US had "examined credible evidence of Maung Maung Soe's activities, including allegations against Burmese security forces of extrajudicial killings, sexual violence and arbitrary arrest as well as the widespread burning of villages."

On 28 September 2018, the UNHCR voted to establish an international body to gather evidence of alleged atrocities committed by Myanmar's security forces and prepare files for future independent criminal proceedings.

On 18 March 2019, Myanmar set up a military court to investigate alleged abuses.

=== Report by the OHCHR ===
On 11 October 2017, the U.N. High Commissioner for Human Rights released a report titled the Mission report of OHCHR rapid response mission to Cox's Bazar, Bangladesh, which detailed the Burmese military's "systematic process" of driving away hundreds of thousands of Rohingyas from Myanmar. The report noted that prior to the attacks on 25 August 2017 and the military crackdown that ensued, the military pursued a strategy to:

- have male Rohingyas between the ages of 15–40 years arrested and/or arbitrarily detained
- have Rohingya political, cultural and religious figures arrested and/or arbitrarily detained
- ensure that access to food, livelihoods and other means of conducting daily activities and life be taken away from Rohingya villagers
- drive out Rohingya villagers en masse through repeated acts of humiliation and violence, such as [the] incitement of [sectarian] hatred, violence and killings
- instill deep and widespread fear and trauma (physical, emotional and psychological) in Rohingyas, through acts of brutality; namely killings, disappearances, torture, and rape (and other forms of sexual violence)

== Government restrictions ==
Access to Rakhine State by journalists and observers has been restricted by the authorities. Myanmar stated in mid-September that it does not bar aid workers from Rakhine, but authorities on ground might restrict access for security reasons. Doctors Without Borders urged Myanmar on 18 September to grant international humanitarian organisations unrestricted and independent access to the conflict zone. In a statement, the organisation said that its international staff had not been granted authorisation to visit the health facilities since the end of August, while the national staff was afraid to go work in the region, after Myanmar officials accused NGOs of colluding with ARSA. In early October 2017, the United Nations denounced the government's refusal of access to Rakhine State, with Mark Lowcock, the head of UN's humanitarian office, stating, "The access we have in northern Rakhine State is unacceptable."

In June 2017, Myanmar's government refused to grant visas to a UN fact-finding mission appointed in March 2017. In December 2017, Myanmar banned Yanghee Lee, the United Nations' special rapporteur on the situation of human rights in Myanmar, who was due to visit the country in January 2018. The government stated that her ban was because of "biased and unfair" statements made by her during her visit in July 2017. Lee accused Aung San Suu Kyi of behaving similarly to the military juntas that ruled before her, citing her response to the treatment of Rohingya Muslims. Lee also stated that the decision suggested "something terribly awful" was happening in Rakhine State. The decision by Myanmar was criticised by Human Rights Watch and Amnesty International.

A local newspaper had claimed that three days after two Reuters reporters were arrested on 12 December, five ethnic Rakhine villagers of Inn Din were arrested on suspicion of giving information about what happened in their village to journalists including the two arrested reporters according to some residents. On 21 December, the UN rejected a report by The Irrawaddy which claimed that the two journalists had passed information to them concerning the violence in Rakhine State. Reuters also denied they worked with the UN or any other organisation. The Ministry of Information cited the police as stating that the two were "arrested for possessing important and secret government documents related to Rakhine State and security forces". It added that they "illegally acquired information with the intention to share it with foreign media". Reuters claimed that they were arrested for investigating a mass grave of Rohingyas near the village of Inn Din.

Knut Ostby, UN's Acting Resident Coordinator and Humanitarian Coordinator for Myanmar, said in August that the UN was only permitted to work in a few villages and the officials often delayed requests to visit parts of Rakhine State.

=== 2019 internet shutdown ===
On 21 June 2019, the government of Myanmar authorised the shutdown of internet services in nine townships which include Ponnangyun, Kyauktaw, Maungdaw, Buthidaung, Rathedaung, Maruk U, Minbya, and Myebon townships in Rakhine State, as well as Paletwa township in Chin State. In September 2019, internet restrictions were lifted in five of the nine townships; four in Rakhine State—Maungdaw, Buthidaung, Rathedaung, and Myebon—and Paletwa township in Chin State. However, they were reimposed in February 2020.

On 22 February 2020, around 100 students gathered in Yangon and demanded an end to the internet shutdown. A case was filed by the government of Myanmar against the nine students who organised the protest, citing section 19 of the Peaceful Assembly Law, which outlaws unauthorised assemblies and carries a maximum six-month prison sentence.

Telenor Myanmar announced on 3 February 2021 that internet restrictions had been lifted in the eight townships of Rakhine, bringing an end to the world's longest internet shutdown.

== Misleading images ==
Misleading images have been used by both sides of the conflict, alongside claims of violence against civilians. Verifying the authenticity of images has become a challenge for researchers, due to media and travel restrictions imposed by Myanmar's government on Rakhine State. In 2016, an OHCHR report stated that it would not use any photograph or video that it had not taken itself. In August 2017, one of the images shared on Twitter by Mehmet Şimşek, a Deputy Prime Minister of Turkey, was of the Rwandan genocide. He later deleted the image and issued a correction.

In September 2017, Burmese officials shared photos that purportedly showed several Rohingyas setting fire to buildings in their own village. However, journalists later recognised two of the arsonists as Hindus from a nearby school building. The arsonists wore what appeared to be tablecloths on their heads to make themselves "appear Muslim". The Eleven Media Group published an article showing burnt Rohingya homes in Ka Nyin Tan, with government spokesman Zaw Htay tweeting a link to it with the caption "Photos of Bengalis setting fire to their houses!" After the story of the misleading images emerged, Zaw Htay said the government was investigating the matter.

On 14 April 2018, Burmese authorities released photos of the "first repatriated Muslim family" receiving "National Verification Cards". Bangladesh's refugee commissioner, Abul Kalam, rejected Myanmar's claims of repatriation, stating that the family never travelled beyond a no-man's land between the two countries.

In July 2018, the Tatmadaw's department of public relations published a propaganda book titled "Myanmar Politics and the Tatmadaw: Part I", in which it contained photos purportedly showing the illegal immigration of Rohingyas during British rule and violence perpetrated by Rohingya villagers against Rakhine villagers. It was later revealed by Reuters that the photos had been captioned misleadingly; a photo that supposedly showed a Rohingya man with the corpses of slain Rakhine locals was actually a photo taken during the Bangladesh Liberation War of a man recovering the corpses of massacred Bengalis, and a photo that claimed to show the entry of hundreds of "Bengali intruders" (i.e. Rohingyas) into Rakhine State was in fact an award-winning photo of Hutu refugees taken in 1996. A third photo claiming to show Rohingyas entering Myanmar in a boat was actually of them leaving the country in 2015. The publisher, a subsidiary of Myawady Daily, later issued an apology and stated that the photos were incorrectly published in the book.

== International reactions ==
International condemnation of government and government-supported civilian attacks on Rohingyas and other minorities in the region led to widespread public protests around the world, in countries such as France and Indonesia.

The State Counsellor of Myanmar, Aung Sun Suu Kyi, has been criticised by the international community for not condemning the violence or the Burmese Army's military response to the crisis. Aung San Suu Kyi was initially backed by the Indian Prime Minister, Narendra Modi; however, the government of India quickly urged "restraint" in the "anti-terrorism" operations.

=== Advisory Commission on Rakhine State ===
In August 2016, former UN Secretary-General Kofi Annan was invited to head the Advisory Commission on Rakhine State, which was responsible for addressing human rights violations in the region. The complete report was published a year later on 25 August – the same day new clashes erupted in the region – by the Kofi Annan Foundation and accepted by the government of Myanmar in August 2017, in which it cited 10% of the world's stateless people as having originated from Rakhine State. One of Kofi Annan's final statements after completing the commission's mandate was this:

We propose a ministerial-level appointment to be made with the sole function of coordinating policy on Rakhine State and ensuring the effective implementation of the Rakhine Advisory Commission's recommendations. The appointee should be supported by a permanent and well-staffed secretariat, which will be an integral part of the Central Committee on Implementation of Peace and Development in Rakhine State and support its work.

Retaliatory attacks by Myanmar's armed forces and Buddhist mobs ensued, leading to a further escalation in the regional humanitarian crisis. Following the deaths of over a thousand civilians in the ensuing violence and the exodus of over 350,000 Rohingya refugees, the office of the President of Myanmar announced on 12 September that it had formed a new 15-member committee to implement the recommendations of the Rakhine Commission. The President's Office stated that the Implementation Committee of Rakhine Advisory Committee was formed to adhere to the recommendations set for improving the security, social affairs and economic development of Myanmar's ethnic Rohingya Muslim minority, improving the sustainability of ethnic villages, removing camps for the displaced and accelerating the citizen verification process for Rohingyas under Myanmar's citizenship laws.
