= Yoe Ta Yoke ambush =

- Part of Rohingya conflict
Date	March 9, 2019
Location	Yoe Ta Yoke, Rakhine State, Myanmar
Result	Arakan Army victory

Belligerents
Myanmar police	Arakan Army

Strength
11-12	60

Casualties and losses
9 killed 2 injured	Unknown

On March 9, 2019, militants from the Arakan Army (AA) attacked a Burmese police station in Yoe Ta Yoke, Rakhine State, Myanmar, killing nine policemen.

== Background ==
Since 2016, the Tatmadaw, or Burmese military, has launched a campaign against Rohingya Muslims, one of the country's many ethnic minorities and the largest ethnic group in Myanmar's Rakhine State. While an insurgency between the government and various Rohingya groups has been ongoing since the 1940s, the attacks by the Tatmadaw in 2016 and 2017 were primarily against civilians in what became the Rohingya genocide.

In late 2018, the Burmese government declared a ceasefire with rebel groups in northern and eastern Myanmar, but this did not include the Arakan Army. The ceasefire was declared after a renewal of clashes between the AA and the Tatmadaw in Rakhine, and the Burmese government seeking to end conflicts with other rebel groups across the country before returning to the war with the AA. In January 2019, the AA attacked several Burmese outposts in Buthidaung, killing 13 policemen.

== Ambush ==
The ambush took place in the evening of March 9, shortly after 11pm. The Myanmar Ministry of Information said that 60 armed militants took part in the ambush on the local police station. The attackers surrounded the police station from three sides, and shouted on the policemen to surrender, who defied the orders. Twelve policemen were stationed at Yoe Ta Yoke at the time of the attack. Nine were killed, one was missing, and two survived. A later leaked combat report said nine were killed and two slightly injured. A weapons cache, including ten BA-63 rifles, were seized.

The Arakan Army claimed an attack took place on March 8 and 10 policemen were killed, but it is unclear if it is the same ambush as Yoe Ta Yoke. Reuters' witnesses and the Burmese government claim the attack took place on March 9.
