= Khin Maung Latt =

Burmese politician

Member of the Amyotha Hluttaw
- In office 1 February 2016 – 1 February 2021
- Constituency: Rakhine State No.3
- In office 31 January 2011 – 2016
- Constituency: Rakhine State No.6

Personal details
- Born: 17 November 1953 (age 72) Sittwe, Rakhine State, Burma (Myanmar)
- Died: 7 March 2021 (aged 67)
- Party: Rakhine National Party
- Spouse: Ma Saw Thar Phyu
- Parent(s): Kyaw Thaung (father); Saw Thar Phyu (mother)

Khin Maung Latt (Burmese: ခင်မောင်လတ; 17 November 1953 - 7 March 2021) was a Burmese politician and an Amyotha Hluttaw MP for Rakhine State No. 2 Constituency. He was a member of Rakhine National Party.

== Early life and education ==
He was born on 17 November 1953 in Rakhine State, Burma (Myanmar). His previous jobs were as a journalist and MP in the Amyotha Hluttaw.

== Political career ==
In the 2010 Myanmar general election, he was elected as an Amyotha Hluttaw MP and elected representative from Rakhine State № 6 parliamentary constituency. In the general election of 2015, he was elected as an MP in the Amyotha Hluttaw and elected representative from Rakhine State № 3 parliamentary constituency.

== Death ==
Latt died 7 March 2021 after having been forcibly removed from his home by the military following the February 2021 coup d'état.
