= Inn Din =

- Village
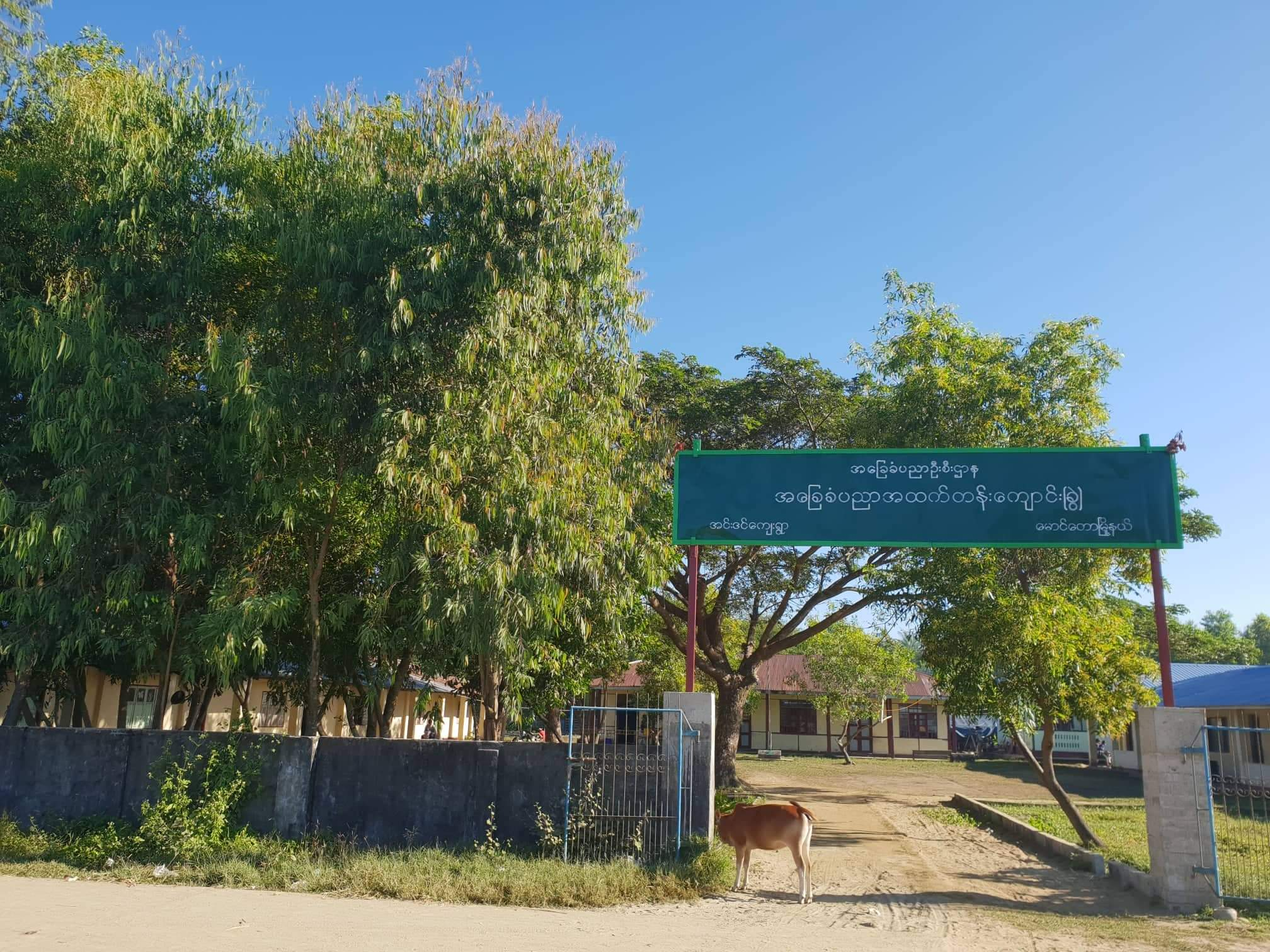
- A school in Inn Din

- Location in Myanmar (Burma)
- Coordinates: 20°30′46″N 92°34′48″E
- Country: Myanmar
- Division: Rakhine State
- District: Maungdaw District
- Township: Maungdaw Township

Population (October 2017)
  - Estimate: 6,000+
- Time zone: UTC+6.30 (MMT)

Inn Din is a village in northern Rakhine State, Myanmar. The village is in an area of mixed ethnicity, including Rohingya and ethnic Rakhine people. In December 2017, a mass grave with ten Rohingya men was discovered near the Inn Din cemetery. In January 2018, the Myanmar military admitted that its soldiers and Rakhine paramilitaries had executed ten captured Rohingyas in September of the previous year.

== Geography ==
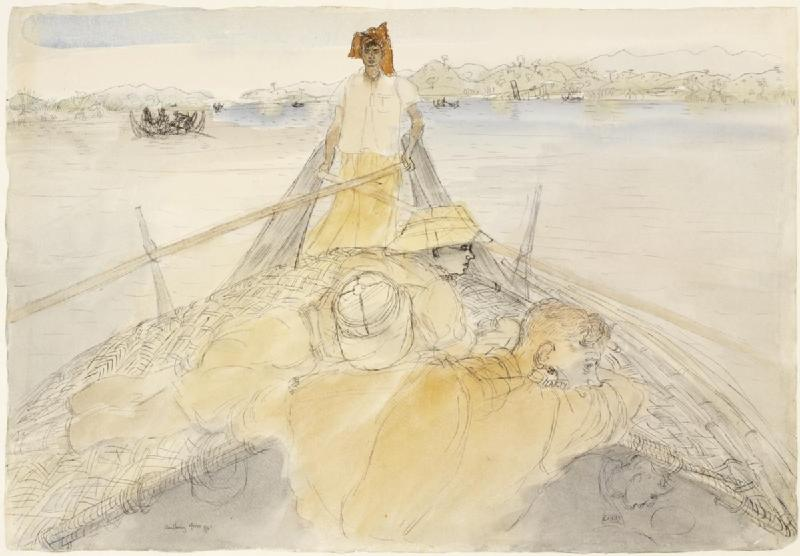
Painting of a sampan convoy on the Mayu River, near Inn Din village, in 1943.

The village is in the south of Rakhine State, located on the coast of the Bay of Bengal, at the western margin of Myanmar. Inn Din is near Maungdaw, just west of Rathedaung, and north of Sittwe. It rests on a peninsula that is a part of the Mayu and Kaladan (Kitsapanadi) river deltas.

== Economy ==
Some sources of income for Inn Din residents include betel tree and rice farming and fishing. Residents have opposed construction of a coal-fired power plant in the area, developed by a Thai affiliate company for the Toyo Engineering Corporation.

== 2017 massacre ==
In December 2017, the Myanmar military declared that it would investigate a grave containing unidentified bodies. The army announced the investigation in a Facebook post by Senior General Min Aung Hlaing.

On 10 January 2018, newspapers reported that Myanmar's military had admitted to killing Rohingya Muslims near the village on 2 September 2017. The military released the findings of its investigation in a second Facebook post, and stated that they had decided to kill Rohingya whom they had detained in the Inn Din cemetery. The Rohingya were subsequently buried in a mass grave at Inn Din. The military stated that its soldiers had helped villagers carry out a revenge attack on people they described as "Bengali terrorists".

Two Reuters journalists investigating evidence of the mass grave at the village were arrested in Yangon and sentenced to seven years in prison. An adviser for Amnesty International stated that satellite photos showed that Rohingya homes around Inn Din had been burned down in a coordinated fashion.

== See also ==
- Persecution of Muslims in Myanmar
