= Advisory Commission on Rakhine State =

The Advisory Commission on Rakhine State (Burmese: ရခိုင်ပြည်နယ်ဆိုင်ရာ အကြံပေးကော်မရှင်) was an international advisory commission headed by former UN Secretary-General Kofi Annan to ensure the social & economical well-being of both the Buddhist and the Rohingya communities of Myanmar's conflict-ravaged Rakhine State (the northern coastal region of Myanmar). The decision to establish the commission was made on 23 August 2016. The commission was an institution of Myanmar, established in cooperation with the Kofi Annan Foundation, and most members were Myanmar citizens. It became widely known and referred to as the "Annan commission" or the "Rakhine commission."

The release of the commission's final report coincided with an explosion of violence throughout Rakhine state that led to the killing, rape and injury of thousands—particularly Rohingya—and the mass expulsion of hundreds of thousands of Rohingya from the country, in one of the largest humanitarian catastrophes of the early 21st Century.

== Rakhine state troubles ==
The Rakhine commission was charged with finding civil solutions to civil unrest and economic hardship in a region (Rakhine state) largely divided between ethnic minorities—particularly the Rakhine Buddhists and Rohingya Muslims—who had each been victims of longtime poverty, exploitation and oppression by Myanmar's military, government and Burman Buddhist majority. The region had been the scene of extensive ethnic and military conflict, and population dislocations, for decades, but especially dramatically in the 21st Century, with the Rohingya generally the most vulnerable and unsuccessful faction.

The commission was unpopular with many Buddhist Myanma, who objected to the intervention in their relations with the Rohingya Muslims. The Rohingya Muslims, an unpopular and impoverished minority in Rakhine state, were denied a wide range of civil rights, even denied citizenship. Myanmar's government and military, and Buddhist Myanma, generally oppose and discredit Rohingya as illegal immigrants from neighbouring "Bengal" (the former region of eastern India that later became East Pakistan and today's Bangladesh). Myanmar generally forbids using the term "Rohingya" to describe these people, whom it calls "Bengali."

== Final report and recommendations ==
The Annan Commission's final report was released August 24, 2017, and it called for several measures to improve life in Rakhine state—including improving the rights of the Rohingya—but the report did not satisfy any faction to the conflicts.

=== Specific recommendations ===
- To invest heavily in infrastructure to help lift both communities out of poverty
- To lift all restrictions from the Rohingya people's human rights
- To review Myanmar's 1982 citizenship law
- To instigate a calibrated approach to security

== Violent aftermath ==
In early August 2017, as it became apparent that the Commission was about to release a final report with recommendations that threatened all sides in the conflict, the Myanmar military—the Tatmadaw—stepped up preparations for conflict, moving more troops into Rakhine state, deputizing Rakhine civilians, and increasing incursions into Rohingya villages. Some researchers and analysts have indicated that the Tatmadaw, working with Rakhines, planned to exterminate or drive out the Rohingya minority from the region.

The commission's final report was released August 24, 2017. The following night, August 25, 2017, a small, lightly armed Rohingya rebel group—the Arakan Rohingya Salvation Army (ARSA) -- launched several coordinated attacks on government outposts in and around Rakhine state, killing 12 troops (at a cost of 50 or more ARSA combatants).

The military—having already pre-positioned forces and begun incursions into Rohingya communities—radically accelerated their attacks on the Rohingya in what it characterized as an "anti-terrorist" "clearance operation." The operation, aided by Rakhine Buddhists, swept through Rohingya villages, injuring, raping and killing thousands—mostly civilians—burning Rohingya villages and driving most of Rakhine state's Rohingya population (over 600,000) into neighboring Bangladesh in what came to be known as the "Rohingya Crisis."

== International response ==
Annan presented his commission's recommendations to the United Nations Security Council shortly after the violence erupted, but—despite the support of U.N. Secretary-General António Guterres -- China and Russia vetoed any effort at significant U.N. intervention.

== Implementation ==
Global pressure—from within the U.N., and from without—eventually led Myanmar's civilian government to "accept" the recommendations of the Annan commission. Under direction of Myanmar's civilian leader Aung San Suu Kyi, a new committee—the "Advisory Board for the Committee for Implementation of the Recommendations on Rakhine State"—was formed, supposedly to "implement" the recommendations of the Rakhine Commission.

However, by mid-2018, that committee had failed to achieve implementation of the Rakhine commission's recommendations, and two of the implementation committee's most prominent members -- Thailand's Former foreign minister Surakiart Sathirathai (the committee Secretary), and a former U.S. ambassador to the United Nations, Bill Richardson—resigned, describing that committee as useless or fraudulent.

== Replacement ==
As the first anniversary of the Rakhine commission's Final Report approached, and a deadline for response to charges from the International Criminal Court, Myanmar's government convened a new commission -- "The Independent Commission of Enquiry"—with largely the same assignment as the original Rakhine commission.

However, critics—including foreign leaders and human rights groups—criticized the new commission's policy of "not pointing fingers," suspecting that the committee was developed to simply provide continuing cover for atrocities of the Myanmar government and military.

Within two days of the new commission's announcement of its intentions, the chairman of the original Rakhine commission, Kofi Annan, died.
