= 2019 Buthidaung raids =

- Part of Conflict in Rakhine State (2016–present)
| Date | January 4, 2019 |
| Location | Ngamyinbaw, Kyaungtaung, Gokepi, and Khahtihla police outposts, northern Buthidaung Township, Rakhine State, Myanmar |
| Result | Partial Arakan Army victory: Ngamyinbaw and Kyaungtaung outposts captured; Burmese police retain control of Gokepi and Khahtihla outposts |

Belligerents
| Myanmar: Tatmadaw | Arakan Army |

Units involved
| 8 Border Police Company; Tatmadaw | Unknown |

Strength
| Unknown | 350 fighters |

Casualties and losses
| 13 killed 9 injured 14 hostages | Unknown |
- 4 civilians taken hostage

The 2019 Buthidaung raids were a series of attacks on January 4, 2019, where militants from Arakan Army simultaneously attacked four Tatmadaw police outposts in villages surrounding Buthidaung, Rakhine State, Myanmar, killing thirteen policemen and injuring nine others.

== Background ==
Since 2016, the Tatmadaw, or Burmese military, has launched a campaign against Rohingya Muslims, one of the country's many ethnic minorities and the largest ethnic group in Myanmar's Rakhine State. While an insurgency between the government and various Rohingya groups has been ongoing since the 1940s, the attacks by the Tatmadaw in 2016 and 2017 were primarily against civilians in what became the Rohingya genocide.

In late 2018, the Burmese government declared a ceasefire with rebel groups in northern and eastern Myanmar, but this did not include the Arakan Army. The ceasefire was declared after a renewal of clashes between the AA and the Tatmadaw in Rakhine, and the Burmese government seeking to end conflicts with other rebel groups across the country before returning to the war with the AA. The Burmese government knew of the AA's plans to attack the outposts in advance, but did not know of the scale of the attacks.

== Raids ==
The raids took place around 6:45 am on January 4, Myanmar's independence day, in a remote area of northern Buthidaung Township. Burmese state media stated 350 AA fighters took part in the raids, with 100 attacking Ngamyinbaw police outpost, 100 at Kyaungtaung outpost, 100 at Khahtihla outpost, and 50 at Gokepi police outpost. Burmese reinforcements were called into the outposts immediately; columns from the 8 Border Police Company and Tatmadaw reached Gokepi first at 9:20 a.m, Khahtihla at 9:30 a.m., Ngamyinbaw at 9:35 a.m., and Kyaungtaung at 12:15pm. Burmese artillery began shelling the Gokepi and Khahtihla outposts at 7:30am, and AA fighters were forced to abandon trying to capture them. Ngamyinbaw and Kyaungtaung were captured by the AA, with the group later abandoning all four outposts and heading east.

An abbot who witnessed the attacks in one of the villages stated that he heard gunshots, and that seven houses were burned down by the AA. Many civilians fled the villages where the raids took place, fearing a renewed outbreak of clashes. The AA killed thirteen police officers and injured nine others, along with taking fourteen policemen and four civilians hostage. Forty weapons and 16,000 rounds of ammunition were also seized by the AA. The hostages were released on January 5. The Burmese government deployed a helicopter to the area on January 6 to evacuate wounded policemen.

== Aftermath ==
Around 4,500 civilians were forced to sleep in monasteries to flee the attacks. The Burmese NLD government ordered the military, for the first time ever, to launch clearance operations in the areas surrounding the police outposts. The Tatmadaw stated that between January 5 and 16, thirteen AA fighters were killed, but did not disclose its own losses. Government spokesman Zaw Htay accused the attackers of having ties to the jihadist Arakan Rohingya Salvation Army (ARSA), despite the AA claiming responsibility for the attack. However, ARSA took responsibility for a January 16 ambush initially attributed to AA that injured six policemen.

The European Union condemned the attacks, but called on the Burmese government to extend the ceasefire to Rakhine State. China also condemned the attacks.
