= Nay San Lwin =

Burmese political activist (born 1978)

- နေဆန်းလွင်
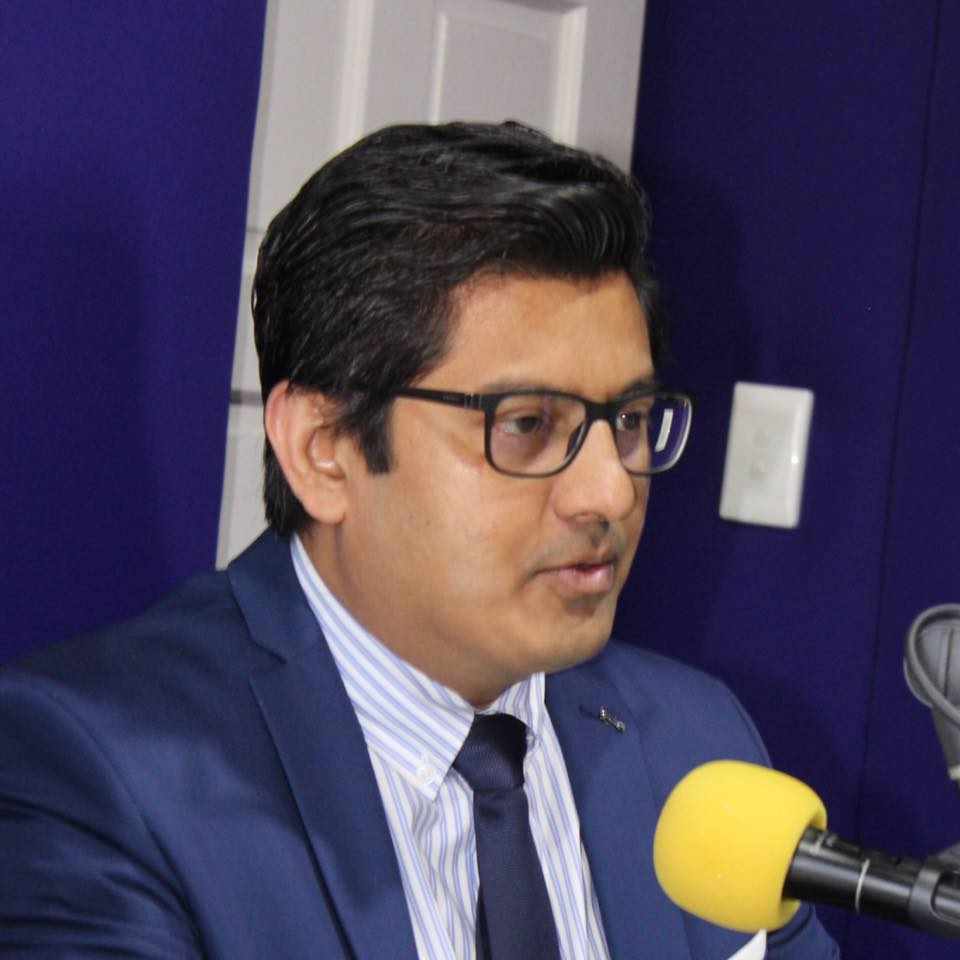
- Born: 1978 (age 47–48); Buthidaung, Myanmar (Burma)
- Education: University of Yangon
- Occupation: Rohingya Activist
- Organization(s): Free Rohingya Coalition, Arakan Rohingya National Council
- Parent(s): U Ba Sein, Daw Khin Hla

Nay San Lwin (Burmese: နေဆန်းလွင်; born 1978) is a prominent Rohingya political activist from Myanmar. He is a prolific commentator on Rohingya issues on radio, television channels and other mainstream media outlets. He was publicly attacked by the Myanmar presidential office and state counsellor's office for his role in getting out news about military atrocities in Northern Rakhine State.

== Early life ==
Nay San Lwin was born in a Rohingya family, in Buthidaung in the northwestern part of Myanmar. He was raised in Rangoon afterwards. His parents were civil servants in Myanmar and his grandfathers were high-ranking officers in Buthidaung Township, Arakan State. His great-grandfather Abdul Zolil was officially recognized as an indigenous person in Burma.

== Activism ==
In April 2018, Lwin co-founded the Free Rohingya Coalition with Maung Zarni. He was targeted, along with Maung Zarni, by Aye Ne Win, a businessman and grandson of Ne Win, who allegedly financed the genocide against ethnic groups in Myanmar. Zarni stated that he has been targeted because he was 'the whistleblower of Rohingya genocide' and helped the UN Fact-Finding Mission on the Rohingya genocide.

In May 2024, while speaking to CNN, Nay San Lwin stated that the Arakan Army had begun targeting Rohingya civilians in Rakhine State, marking an escalation beyond past violence attributed solely to Myanmar's military. He described widespread instances in which the Arakan Army burned Rohingya homes, looted villages, and forced residents to flee, particularly in Buthidaung in mid‑May 2024, displacing over 200,000 people.

In July 2025, Nay San Lwin was appointed Co-Chair of the Arakan Rohingya National Council (ARNC), a unified political platform representing Rohingya communities from Myanmar, refugee camps in Bangladesh, and the global diaspora.

=== Response to the 2026 ICJ ruling ===
Following the International Court of Justice's ruling on 19 November 2026 finding Myanmar responsible for committing genocide against the Rohingya, Nay San Lwin, speaking in The Hague as Co-Chair of the Arakan Rohingya National Council (ARNC), stated: "For the Rohingya, justice means the restoration of our citizenship, recognition of our identity, and our safe and dignified return home. Our struggle will continue until that day comes."
