= Rakhine offensive =

Military operation in Myanmar

Rakhine Offensive
- Part of the Myanmar civil war (2021–present), Operation 1027
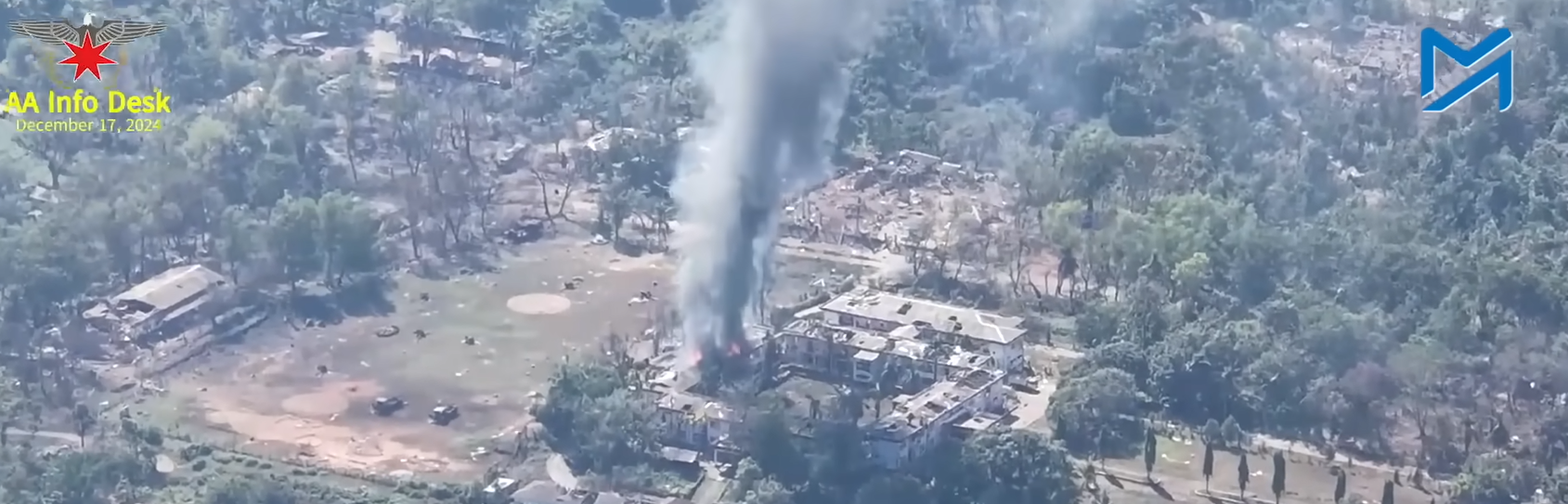
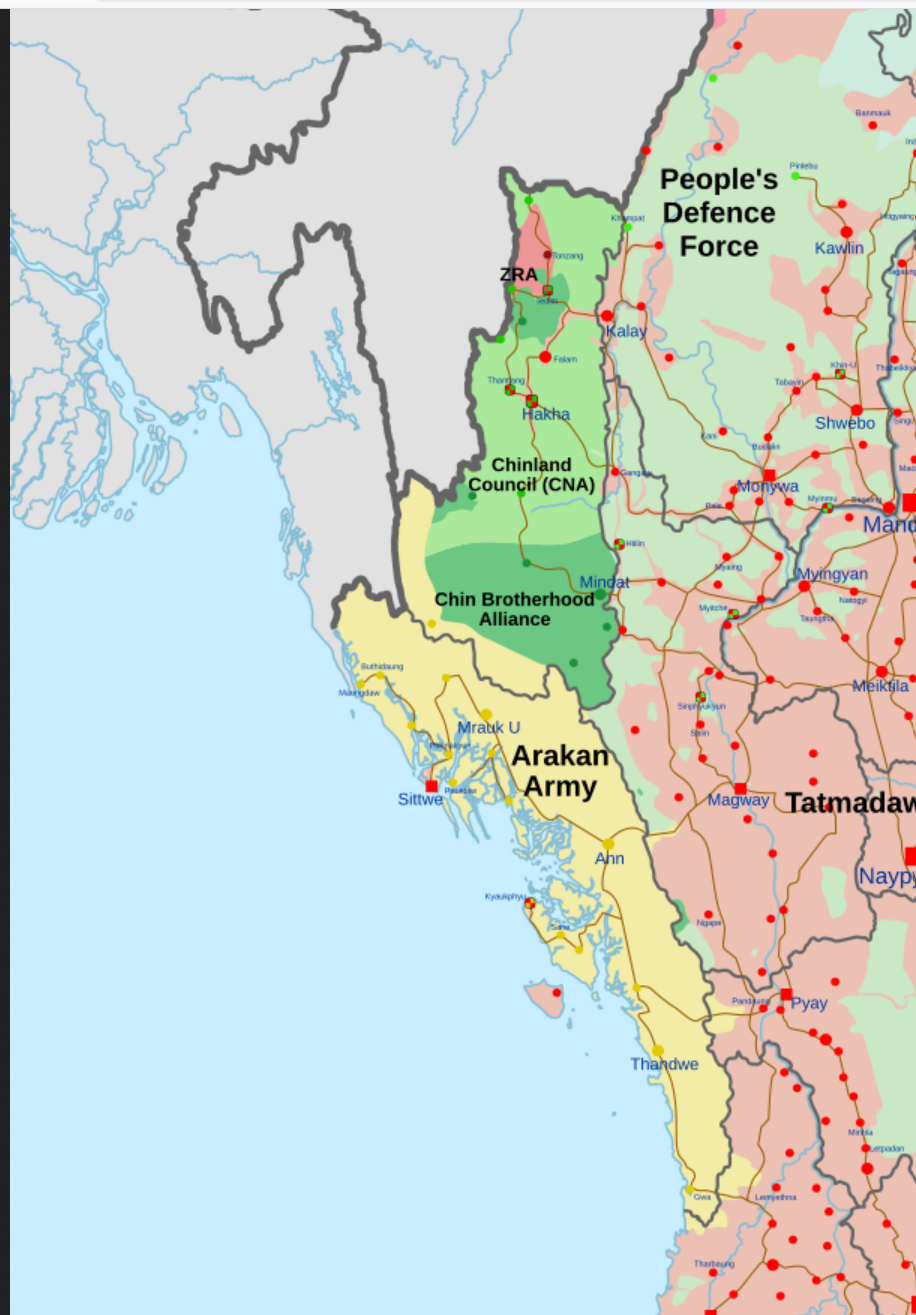
- Arakan Army captures the Myanmar military's Western Command headquarters in Ann Map of gains as of August 2025 made by the Arakan Army since 2023
Date	13 November 2023 – present (2 years, 3 months, 2 weeks and 4 days)
Location	Rakhine State, Paletwa Township (Chin State) and Ngape Township (Magway Region), Pandaung Township (Bago Region), Kyonpyaw Township, Lemyethna Township, Pathein Township, Thabaung Township, Yegyi Township (Ayeyarwaddy Region) Myanmar. Bangladesh-Myanmar border
Status	Ongoing
Territorial changes	Arakan Army captures 9 major towns and 8 townships (Note: Townships: Kyauktaw Township, Minbya Township, Mrauk-U Township, Myebon Township, Pauktaw Township, Ponnagyun Township, Ramree Township, Rathedaung Township Towns: Kyauktaw, Minbya, Mrauk-U, Myebon, Paletwa (Chin State), Pauktaw, Ponnagyun, Ramree, Rathedaung, Buthidaung)

Belligerents
Government of Myanmar: State Administration Council (until 2025); Tatmadaw; Arakan Rohingya Army; Arakan Rohingya Salvation Army; Rohingya Solidarity Organisation; Rohingya Islami Mahaz	Arakan Army; People's Defence Force; Chinland Defense Force

Commanders and leaders
Min Aung Hlaing; Soe Win; Mya Tun Oo; Ataullah abu Ammar Jununi (POW); Ko Ko Linn; Nabi Hossain	Twan Mrat Naing; Nyo Twan Awng

Units involved
Tatmadaw; Myanmar Army; Western Command; Myanmar Air Force; Navy; Myanmar Police Force; Border Guard Police; Pyusawhti militias; Arakan Liberation Army	Arakan Army: Arakan Army Auxiliaries (AAA); People's Defence Force; People's Independence Army; Student Armed Force; Minbu District Battalions; Asho Chin Defence Force

Strength
10,000+	50,000+

Casualties and losses
1,240–1,440+ killed (incomplete list)	Unknown
- 1,152 civilians killed, 2,153 injured (per a statement by HDCO(ULA), 10 December 2025); 735 civilians killed, 1,569 injured (per a statement by AA, 18 November 2024); Nearly 200 civilians killed, more than 500 injured (per RFA, 3 April 2024); Over 550,000 displaced (per ULA report, 18 November 2024); More than 300,000 displaced (per UNOCHA, 14 March 2024)

On 13 November 2023, the Arakan Army (AA), an ethnic resistance group active in the civil war in Myanmar, launched a military offensive against Myanmar's military junta in Rakhine and southern Chin State. Fighting began alongside the launch of Operation 1027, in which the Arakan Army participated as a member of the Three Brotherhood Alliance. The offensive broke an informal ceasefire between the Arakan Army and the junta that had been in place for a year. During the offensive, the Arakan Army captured several towns in northern Rakhine, including Mrauk U, the capital of Mrauk-U District and the historical capital of Arakan. These gains gave them total control over most of northern Arakan. The Arakan Army followed these successes by besieging Sittwe, the state capital, and Ann, the headquarters of the junta's western command. They also launched offensives in the southern parts of the state, capturing several towns and throwing junta forces into disarray. Since 2025, the Arakan Army has expanded its offensive to Bago, Magway, and Ayeyarwady, threatening junta ordnance factories along the Irrawaddy River. The International Institute for Strategic Studies reported that the Arakan Army's sweeping gains "are already enough to enable self-rule over a large portion of the Rakhine homeland and to reshape the wider balance of power in Myanmar." According to the Diplomat, the AA's offensive could lead to Rakhine State becoming the "Myanmar’s first truly autonomous region".

== Background ==
The Arakan Army (AA) and its civilian wing, the United League of Arakan, were founded in 2009 and quickly became one of Myanmar's strongest rebel groups. By 2018, they had gained territory in northern Rakhine State and Paletwa Township in southern Chin State and fought the Tatmadaw in late 2018 after the central government entered their territory. The fighting intensified until the Arakan Army announced a unilateral ceasefire in November 2020 to facilitate voting in the 2020 general election.

After the civil war resurged in 2021, the Arakan Army focused more on expanding their administrative capabilities. However, over the 2022 monsoon season, the ceasefire broke down. With the military's attention diverted to the growing resistance elsewhere and rising popular support for an alliance with the NUG, the AA sought to expand its influence into southern Rakhine.

On 26 November 2022, the Arakan Army and the junta agreed to a temporary ceasefire brokered by Yōhei Sasakawa of the Nippon Foundation. Arakan Army spokespeople maintained that they agreed to the ceasefire for humanitarian reasons, not because of international pressure. The Arakan Army did not withdraw from fortifications held at the time of the ceasefire.

After Operation 1027 began, Tatmadaw incompetence and the rapid gains of the Three Brotherhood Alliance inspired many previously disconnected resistance groups to work towards unity to overthrow the Tatmadaw, which came to power after a coup in 2021.

== Timeline ==
=== Offensive begins ===
On the morning of 13 November 2023, the Arakan Army (AA) attacked two Border Guard Police stations in Rathedaung Township, breaking the Rakhine State Ceasefire Agreement between the junta and the Arakan Army. Dong Paik camp was captured by 6:30 am. On 14 November, the junta had already abandoned around 40 outposts in Rakhine state after attacks by the Arakan Army, but few came under their immediate control. Dozens of Myanmar security officers surrendered to the Arakan Army the following day.

The following night, the Arakan Army launched an attack on Pauktaw, seizing the township police station. By the next morning, the Arakan Army had taken control of the town. The junta sent two helicopter gunships alongside naval support to fire back, including at civilian housing, with heavy machine gun fire. Pauktaw's proximity to the Rakhine state capital, Sittwe, posed a threat to the junta. Junta forces detained about 100 residents who were unable to flee, and positioned themselves to surround the town, using two navy ships to blockade the harbour.

On 14 November, the Arakan Army launched an offensive in Paletwa Township on the Chin-Rakhine border. The Arakan Army accused the Tatmadaw of using chemical weapons during the ensuing battles. On 6 December, the Arakan Army announced that they had captured a major military base in the township.

On 8 January 2024, the Arakan Army continued the offensive and captured the Taung Shey Taung base and its 200 junta soldiers in Kyauktaw Township, Rakhine State. They then escalated their offensive into Paletwa Township, Chin State with the aim of capturing Paletwa, a strategic town for the Indo-Myanmar Kaladan Multi-Modal Transit Transport Project On 15 January, the Arakan Army seized Paletwa and the entire township, declaring it a "military council-free area." A week later, the Arakan Army captured the town of Pauktaw in Rakhine State concluding a three-month battle.

On 17 January 2024, the Taingen camp on the Falam road to the Indian border was captured, with Chin resistance forces seizing arms and ammunition. On 20 January 2024, after more than 600 junta soldiers and refugees crossed the India–Myanmar border, the Government of India announced a plan to fence the entire border.

=== Fall of Mrauk U ===
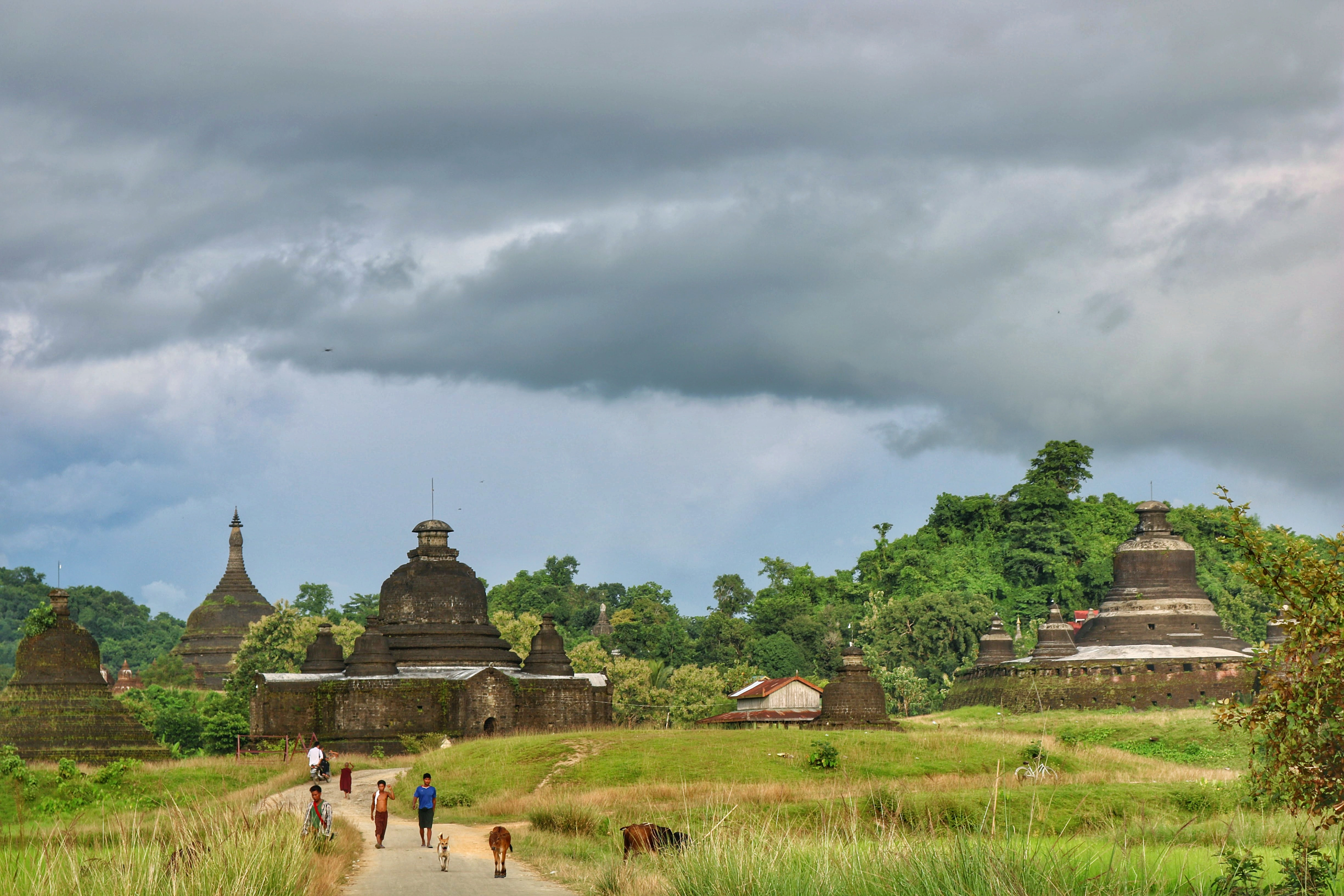
Mrauk U ancient temples in 2017

The Arakan Army captured most remaining Tatmadaw bases in Minbya by 6 February, almost taking full control of the township. On the same day, the Arakan Army seized the Taung Pyo junta outpost along the border with Bangladesh in Maungdaw Township. The Arakan Army captured Kyauktaw the next day and continued fighting in Mrauk U and Ramree.

On February 7, the Arakan Army took control of Minbya Township after capturing the last two military battalion headquarters in the township. Colonel Min Min Tun, commander of the 11th Light Infantry Division of the Tatmadaw, was killed during a battle at the base of the 377th Light Infantry Battalion in Mrauk-U Township.

The Tatmadaw abandoned Myebon to reinforce Kyaukphyu on 9 February, leaving ammunition behind in their rush and abandoning the southern township of Mrauk-U District. The same day, the AA took the city of Mrauk U, completing their control over the township. Three Myanmar Navy landing craft, carrying 700–900 retreating junta soldiers, were sunk during the battle. The survivors of the sinking were reportedly shot at and attacked with knives by villagers and soldiers, which a spokesperson for the Arkhan Army denied. In response to the seizure of the three towns, the junta blew up bridges in Kyauktaw Township and the state capital, Sittwe.

==== Consolidation of Mrauk U District ====
During an evacuation attempt by the junta from Kyauktaw town during attacks by the Arakan Army on the same day, three naval landing craft were sunk. This resulted in the death of 700–900 retreating junta soldiers and their family members. According to a statement from the Arakan Army, the rebels rescued Brigadier General Zaw Min Tun, commander of the 9th Military Operations Command, and some of his soldiers from the river.

The Arakan Army announced on 30 January that it was fighting to oust the junta from the coastal city of Ramree in Rakhine State. The junta had reportedly bombarded the town from gunboats for weeks before fighting began. 8,000 of the town's residents had been displaced due to the fighting. The AA claimed that the regime forces used chemical weapons to defend the town, a claim that the junta denied.

On 15 February, the Arakan Army captured Myebon and started intensifying their assaults on Ramree. These assaults killed around 80 junta reinforcements between 24 and 26 February. On 28 February, the Arakan Army captured the final junta outpost in Minbya Township, taking full control of the township.

=== Continued northern offensives ===
On 5 March, the Arakan Army reportedly captured the town of Ponnagyun and its surrounding township. During the battle, junta warships and fighter jets shelled the town, eventually destroying the Zay Ti Pyin bridge connecting Ponnagyun to Rathedaung. The Arakan Army stated that it continued assaults on Rathedaung and Buthidaung Townships. The capture of Ponnagyun is significant as it is only 33 kilometres northeast of the regional capital, Sittwe, and allows the Arakan Army to threaten the city. Tatmadaw tactical commander Colonel Myo Min Ko Ko and Major Saw Htwe were killed in Ponnagyung.

On 12 March, after an 85-day battle, the Arakan Army captured the town of Ramree. In Maungdaw Township, AA also captured a border outpost forcing 179 junta soldiers to flee into neighboring Bangladesh. On 17 March, the Arakan Army captured the town of Rathedaung, cutting off Sittwe from northern Rakhine State. The AA claimed that the junta used forcibly conscripted Rohingya people as human shields during its unsuccessful defense of the town.

On 15 April, the Arakan Army and the Arakan Rohingya Salvation Army (ARSA) clashed in Buthidaung Township, killing 25 Rohingyas. A local reported that the Tatmadaw and ARSA fought together during the clashes. The Arakan Army announced on 18 May that it had taken complete control of Buthidaung, capturing the last junta positions in the area. The Arakan Army said that clashes continued with junta forces and armed Rohingya groups outside the town. Twelve Rohingya civilians were reportedly killed in a junta airstrike on 17 May, and that same day the Arakan Army allegedly bombed a school with drones where Rohingya civilians were sheltering, killing 18 and wounding around 200. Following Buthidaung's fall, large portions of the town and outlying villages were systematically burned to the ground. Witnesses and international organizations accused the Arakan Army of engaging in retaliatory arson against Rohingya people, ordering them out of their homes before burning them to the ground. The Arakan Army denied any involvement with the attack, blaming the fires on junta shelling during the course of the battle.

On 3 May, the Arakan Army captured the headquarters of the Border Guard Police in Maungdaw Township at Kyee Kan Pyin. The Arakan Army began launching attacks on Maungdaw town on 21 May. The next day, the AA claimed the capture of the No. 2 Border Guard Police Detachment near the entrance to the city.

Map showing the battle of Maungdaw during May–December 2024.

On 5 August 2024, the Arakan Army attacked Rohingya civilians in Maungdaw Township, Rakhine State killing 221. According to the Rohingya news group, Kaladan Press, the attack was possibly triggered by a large gathering of RSO fighters near the massacre area. Then, AA attacked the area indiscriminately.

As of November 2024, the Arakan Army controls most of Maungdaw town, with junta holdouts remaining in the No. 5 Border Guard Police Detachment, the final SAC outpost in the township. On 5 October, it was reported that the junta accidentally killed twenty of its own soldiers in an airstrike that struck the detachment. The Arakan Army also continued to clash with the ARSA and RSO in Maungdaw and Buthidaung townships. On December 8, AA captured BGP 5, removing the junta's control of Maungdaw Township and the Bangladeshi border.

=== Central and southern Rakhine offensives ===
On 16 February, following clashes with the Arakan Army, junta forces abandoned the town of Ma Ei, destroying a bridge leading to the town as they left. Arakan Army forces occupied the town soon after and began landmine clearance operations.

On 24 March, the Arakan Army began an offensive on Ann Township concurrently with their offensive on Sittwe, launching attacks on Ann, the headquarters of the junta's Western Command. North of Ann, the Arakan Army launched attacks on neighbouring Ngape Township in Magway Region. Ann's location is strategically important as the link between Rakhine and Magway via the Minbu-Ann road through the Arakan Mountains and as a gateway preventing AA from attacking southern Rakhine State. On 27 March, Arakan Army forces seized a camp near Ge Laung village, Ann Township. On 2 April, the Arakan Army announced it had captured a portion of the Ann-Minbu Highway, cutting off Ann from neighboring Padein. During these offensives, on 10 April, the Arakan Army rebranded itself as the "Arakha Army" to represent all people living in Rakhine State. On 27 April, the Arakan Army captured Taw Hein Taung base in the hilltops of Ann township. On 26 June, locals reported that the fighting had moved closer to the town proper since the Taw Hein Taung base had fallen, prompting many to try and flee the fighting.

On 13 April, the Arakan Army began clashing with junta forces along the Thandwe-Taungup highway. Intense clashes broke out on 22 April around the Tha Htay hydropower plant in northern Thandwe Township, reportedly leading to the deaths of "dozens" of junta soldiers. On 25 April, the Arakan Army began clashing with junta forces near the Ngapali Beach. On 7 June, clashes broke out between the Arakan Army and junta forces north of Thandwe, with fighting inching steadily closer to the city over the following days. On 26 June, the Arakan Army seized the headquarters of the junta's Battalion 566, forcing military troops to retreat to the town's airport and hotels inside the city. The Arakan Army announced they had secured the airport on 5 July. Militia reinforcements brought by the regime from across Myanmar, as well as shelling from navy ships offshore, were unable to stop the Arakan Army's continued progress in its offensive. The Arakan Army claims to have killed over 400 troops during its push to seize the city. On 15 July, the Arakan Army took control of Thandwe Prison, a major junta strong point. In the following days, it successfully consolidated its control over the town, pushing out remaining junta forces. On 7 August, the Arakan Army launched an attack against the Maung Shwe Lay Naval Base outside Thandwe. By 30 August, the Arakan Army had successfully entered the base after clashes through the preceding weeks. The naval base fell to the Arakan Army on 5 September.

On 15 June, the Arakan Army launched an offensive to seize the town of Taungup. Heavy fighting broke out around Taungup University, where a junta artillery battalion is stationed, and clashes were reported in downtown areas as well. Retaliatory junta airstrikes reportedly hit civilian areas. Shelling from junta forces also damaged parts of the university. On 18 June, the town's general administrator, as well as another town official, were arrested by the junta while trying to flee from the fighting to Yangon. On 20 June, the Arakan Army ambushed a column of junta soldiers that had been sent from central Myanmar to reinforce the town, reportedly killing over 60 regime soldiers, including a captain. On 23 June, two civilians were wounded after stepping on a landmine placed by junta forces. Civilians were reportedly attempting to flee Taungup but were being turned back by junta forces.

After a period of relative calm, conflict in Taungup resumed at the end of October, when the Arakan Army attacked a junta artillery position outside the town. Fighting in Taungup continued throughout the next week following the base's fall, with the Arakan Army closing to within 10 km of the town. By 14 November, reports indicated that fighting had moved into the town itself.

On 9 August, the Arakan Army advanced into the state's southernmost township, Gwa Township. Clashes were reported around the Chinkwin Bridge and the town of Kyeintali. On 14 August, the Arakan Army captured the town. Junta forces destroyed a bridge near the town during their retreat. Following their capture of Kyeintali, the Arakan Army pushed further south to the village of Satthwa, where they were halted by junta troops. Retreating junta troops allegedly engaged in looting of local villages as they fled. Reports indicated that junta troops in Gwa had been reinforced by formations drawn from Ayeyarwady Region. According to analysts, there were fears within the junta that Gwa falling to the Arakan Army could let fighting spread into Ayeyarwady, which has been largely conflict-free throughout the war.

Map showing the battle of Taungup during November–December 2024.

Narinjara News reported on 12 August that over the course of the offensive, junta forces had destroyed 22 bridges throughout the state in attempts to impede the Arakan Army's advances.

On 14 December 2024, AA captured Taungup Township.

On December 29, 2024, AA captured Gwa Township after months of fighting.

==== Offensive in Sittwe ====
In late 2025, the AA largely began attacking Sittwe after capturing most of Rakhine State. In early January 2026, AA forces advancing from Ponnagyun Township overran junta positions near Tawkan and Kantkaw Kyun, crossing a creek that separates the two areas. By 2026, Sittwe district is the only town in northern Rakhine state which is still under junta control.

==== Battle of Ann ====
Beginning on 26 September, the Arakan Army launched an offensive against military bases around Ann.

By 21 October, the Arakan Army had begun attacking the Western Command headquarters near the town. The group had reportedly completely surrounded the town and occupied Ann's airport. On 20 December, the Arakan Army said it had seized the headquarters of the Western Command.

=== Offensives beyond Rakhine State (January 2025–present) ===
Following the capture of all but three of Rakhine State's townships by the end of 2024, the Arakan Army has since begun offensives in the Bago, Magway, and Ayeyarwady regions. The AA's advance in these regions could eventually expose the junta's military factories on the west bank of the Irrawaddy River to attacks.

==== Magway Region ====
Starting from January 11, 2025, AA and their allies have launched an assault on Myanmar junta outposts guarding an artillery base on the Ann-Padan Road linking Rakhine State with neighboring Magway Region. Clashes also broke out that day on the outposts of two Arakan Mountain villages near Goggyi, just 32 kilometers from Padan in Magwe’s Ngape Township. The People’s Revolution Alliance-Magway group reported attacking five junta vehicles carrying around 100 junta soldiers near Goggyi village with remote-controlled mines, killing four and wounding 13 others. On 28 September the group announced it captured the Gokkyi column supply base.

In December, 2025, intense clashes has broke out along the Magway-Rakhine border as junta fights to secure it's Nat Yay Kan air base. The junta’s defenses are centered around Artillery Headquarters 905 in Padan. To defend the area, the junta deployed the entire 99th Light Infantry Division (around 2,500–3,000 junta troops) to reinforce Nat Yay Kan and prepare counterattacks. According to military sources, within the period of March-April, 2026, more than 30 junta soldiers during the battle of Natyekan hill base in Ngape Township have reportedly surrendered to the AA.

==== Bago Region ====
During 2025, the Padaung front in Bago Region saw intense clashes. On 27 January, AA announced it seized the Moehtitaung junta camp in theRakhine Yoma mountain range near Bago border. On April 2, the Brotherhood Alliance announced that the AA had captured the Nyaungyo strategic base located in west Bago. In late December, the group and its allied forces captured the junta’s strategic Point 666 hilltop base in the Nyaungyo area.

On January 4, 2026, the AA commando unit unexpectedly attacked a military convoy in the Nyaung Gyo area of Padaung Township, killing about 10 soldiers, including Colonel Han Lin Aung.

==== Ayeyarwady Region ====
Having captured all of southern Rakhine, the Arakan Army began incursions into the Ayeyarwady Region from Gwa Township. In January 2025, the AA captured Magyizin and Bomie villages in Thabaung Township. In March, the AA continued its advance towards Thabaung and began attacking Infantry Battalion 308 in the city's vicinity.

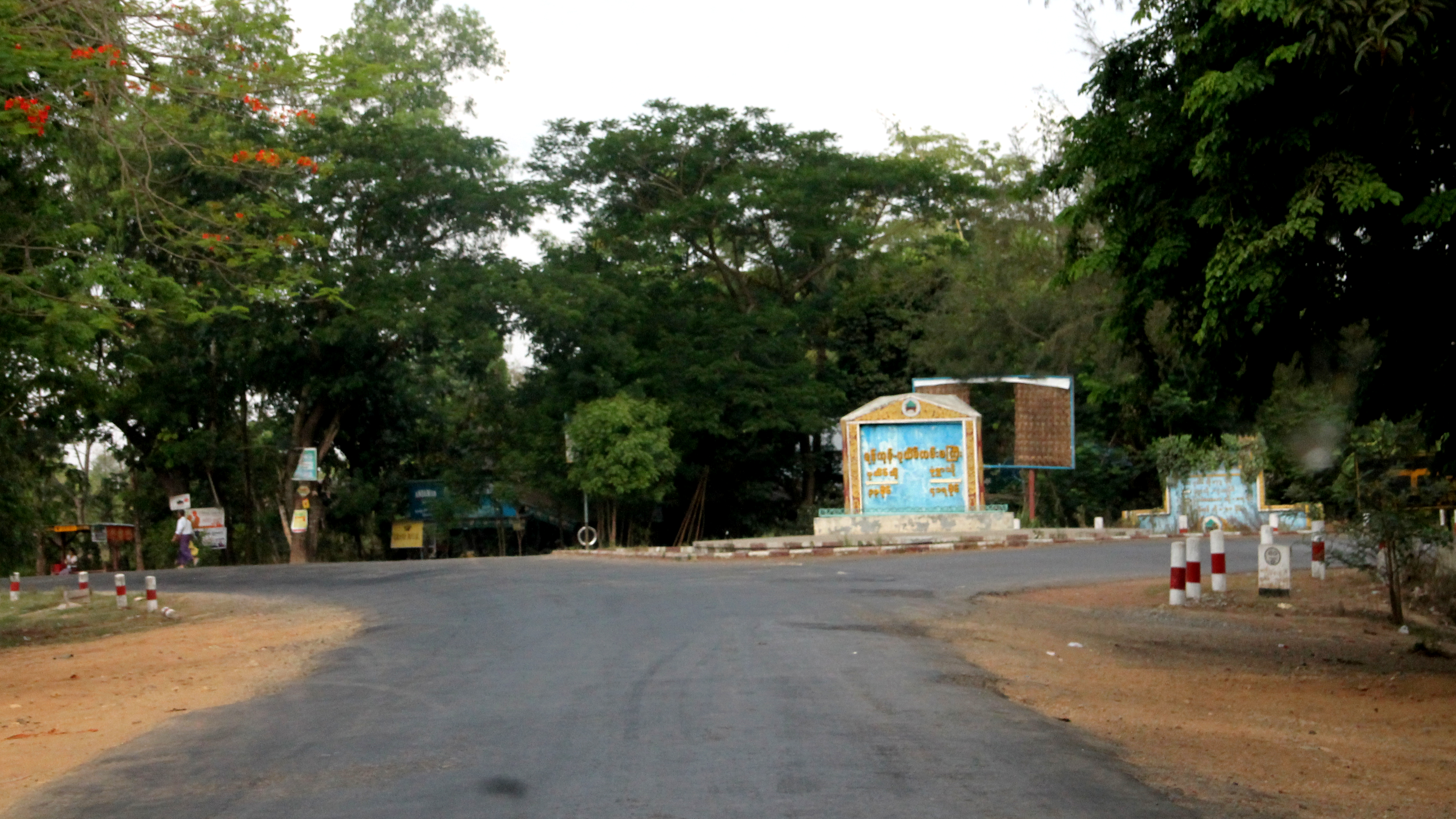
Pathein-Monywa Highway road

The AA then entered Lemyethna Township and began clashing with the junta in villages near the Pathein-Monywa Highway. By 26 March, 2025, the AA captured several of these villages, including Tonetaw, Le Khon Gyi, Le Khon Lay, Wut Kone, and San Kone. By the end of 2025, AA forces have pushed into the townships of Thabaung, Ngathaingchaung, Lemyethna, and Ingapu, while also intensifying operations along the Pathein–Monywa highway. In response, the regime has deployed roughly 2,000 troops to the area, including forces from regional military commands and battalions attached to the 66th Light Infantry Division. Since May 9, 2026, fierce fighting has broke out near the junta’s No. 344 Artillery Battalion in Yekyi Township after regime troops launched an offensive towards AA-controlled areas. The military relied heavily on airstrikes and artillery on resistance as their outpost came under attacks. By the last week of May 2026, AA and allied forces have encircled and attacked the No. 334 Artillery Battalion within about a mile of the base killing at least 3 junta troops in the week along with additional soldier casualties.

=== Tatmadaw's counter offensive ===
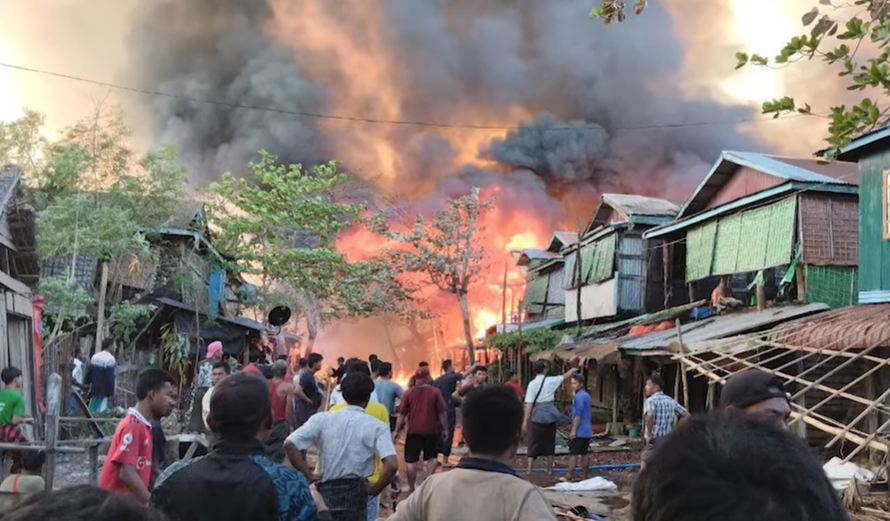
Myanmar Air Force bombing Kyauktaw Township in January 2025

Tatmadaw launched an offensive into Rakhine in early September to relieve encircled cities in Rahkine, with some initial victories for Arakan Army. However Tatmadaw is said to be deploying large numbers of troops to the task. With fighting in three townships, Bago, Irrawaddy and Magwe. Fighting described as intense. Heavy fighting is continuing. Tatmadaw's objectives are to take Ann, Taungup, Thandwe and Gwa townships from the Arakan Army. The hope of Tatmadaw is to have these objectoves met by October sometime. The Arakan Army is advancing within 12km of Ordnance Factory (KaPaSa) No. 14 in Magway Region's Ngape Township, an important ammunition factory for the Tatmadaw.

On 11 March 2026, The Myanmar Air Force carried out airstrikes utilizing 8 aircraft on a P.O.W. camp controlled by the Arakan Army in Ann Township, killing its own soldiers and resulting in the death of 116 prisoners of war and civilians. 32 others were also reported injured. The attack also killed Brigadier General Myin Shwe, along with numerous high majors and military doctors.

By mid April 2026, the military regime has ramped up naval deployments and drone surveillance along southern Rakhine's AA-held coast.

== Ethnic tensions with Rohingya ==
Between 4 February and 6 February, the Arakan Army launched attacks on Rakhine Border Guard Police (BGP) outposts in Maungdaw Township. The Arakan Army later alleged that the Rohingya ethnic armed organisations (EAOs) Arakan Rohingya Salvation Army and Rohingya Solidarity Organisation fought alongside the Rakhine BGP, allegations they gave no evidence towards. On 6 February the Arakan Army and the RSO cooperated on a joint assault against the Arakan Rohingya Army, who had captured a BGP camp along the Bangladesh-Myanmar border. 2 days later, the RSO denounced AA's accusations and the AA labeling them as "Bengalis" among other issues. However, RSO spokesperson Ko Ko Linn later confessed in an interview with BBC Burmese that the armed group cooperated with the Tatamadaw during the Battles of Buthidaung and Maungdaw. Some time in March, a Rohingya man was shot in Sittwe. After the Arakan Army was blamed, it was found that the shooting was committed by the Arakan Liberation Army, working as a proxy of the junta to stir ethnic tensions.

In late February, despite the conscription law only applying to citizens, the military junta reportedly began to conscript displaced Rohingyas living in Kyaukphyu. On 6 March, in response to this junta recruitment, the AA urged Rohingya people to flee into AA-controlled areas despite the tense relations between the AA and Rohingya EAOs. In Buthidaung, ARSA was allegedly training Rohingya people for the junta. Nay San Lwin, co-founder of the Free Rohingya Coalition, stated that at least 1,000 people from the Rohingya community being taken by the military from Buthidaung, Sittwe and Kyaukphyu, and dozens have been killed while being used as human shields in Rathedaung Township. In April and May, there were protests held in Buthidaung by Rohingya residents against the Arakan Army. In April, Rohingya conscripts backed by the junta burnt down Rakhine settlements in Buthidaung as the Arakan Army's offensive approached the town. On April 15, the Arakan Army clashed with the ARSA in Buthidaung, resulting in 25 Rohingya deaths and 3,000 fleeing. ARSA and ARA reportedly fought with the Tatmadaw, where they burnt down homes and kidnapped civilians.

In September 2024, RSO leadership revealed to Reuters during an interview that they have an informal understanding with the Tatmadaw to only attack AA.

According to Arakan Rohingya National Council, since AA took control of much of northern Rakhine, over 2,500 Rohingya have been killed and more than 150,000 have been forced to flee to Bangladesh.

== Current status ==
The Arakan Army launched its offensive on November 13, 2023. As of late 2025 it had been ongoing for two years, during which the group captured 15 townships.

Under Arakan Army
Date of Capture	Township	Notes
14 January 2024	Paletwa	
19 January 2024	Pauktaw	
8 February 2024	Mrauk-U	Fall of Mrauk U
13 February 2024	Kyauktaw	
15 February 2024	Myebon	
4 March 2024	Ponnagyun	
11 March 2024	Ramree	
17 March 2024	Rathedaung	
18 May 2024	Buthidaung	Battle of Buthidaung
5 September 2024	Thandwe	
4 December 2024	Taungup	
8 December 2024	Maungdaw	Battle of Maungdaw
20 December 2024	Ann	Battle of Ann
29 December 2024	Gwa	
26 February 2025	Minbya	
Under Military Junta
—	Sittwe	Battle of Sittwe
—	Kyaukphyu	Battle of Kyaukphyu
—	Manaung	

== Analysis ==
According to Brigadier General Thaung Tun and Kyaw Kyaw Than, the AA’s victory in multiple areas came from shifting battlefield tactics. Instead of direct attacks, it used coordinated multi-directional offensives and cut off supply routes. Ann’s location, with three main access routes from Sittwe, Taungup, and Magway was turned into a weak point for the Myanmar military by which the AA exploited by attacking from multiple sides and blocking reinforcements.

== Civilian impact ==
According to RFA’s figures, 73 civilians were killed and 103 were injured between March 1 and March 18, 2024, for the junta sent airstrikes and artillery fire into communities captured by the Arakan Army. The UN chief António Guterres expressed "alarm" about the air attacks and called for calm.

The United Nations Development Program (UNDP) released a report on 7 November warning of a looming famine in Rakhine. The report stated that if action was not taken to stop it, a famine could grip up to 95 percent of the population, predicting that local food production would only cover a fifth of the state's by spring. The UNDP alleged that blockades placed on Rakhine by the SAC to isolate the state were "clearly aimed at... exacting collective punishment on an already vulnerable population." The report also detailed possible side effects of such a catastrophe, detailing the possibility of increases in human trafficking, labor shortages, and large migration away from the region.

The United League of Arakan released a report on 18 November, 2024, that 735 civilians, including 132 children, had been killed over the course of the conflict in 2024. The highest number of civilian deaths occurred in Sittwe, Buthidaung, and Maungdaw townships. The report also put the number of civilians detained by the junta and its allies at 749, alleging junta efforts to block civilians from fleeing conflict zones. The report stated that over 550,000 people had been displaced and 6,400 homes had destroyed.

Over the six months, from May 2025 to 23 October 2025, around 40 Rakhine civilians had been killed and 17 being injured due to attacks from ARSA.

According to data released by the AA, at least 1,152 civilians were killed and 2,153 injured in the region between November 2023 and November 2025 as a result of airstrikes, shelling, and ground offensives. Schools have been hit by bombings and hospitals have been destroyed. Monasteries, residential neighborhoods, and displacement camps have also come under attack. The UNICEF has described the protection of schools and hospitals as “non-negotiable” civilian infrastructure. According to local civil society groups, childrens in Rakhine have experienced severe and growing psychological trauma due to Myanmar’s military air bombings.

=== Spillover into Bangladesh ===
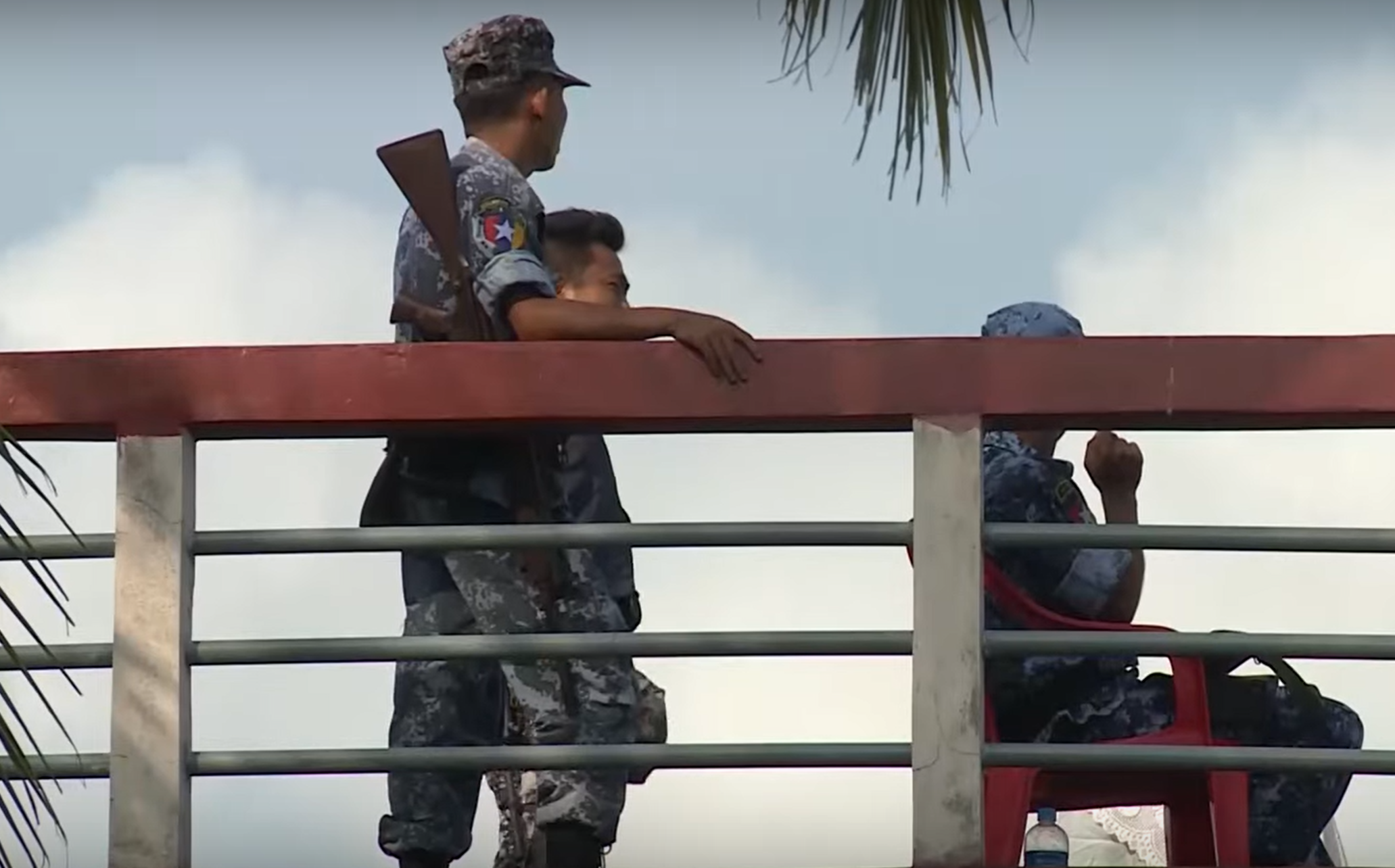
Myanmar Border Guard Police observing the Bangladesh border in June 2024

On 3 February 2024, as the clashes between the Arakan Army and Tatmadaw increased in Rakhine, mortar shells and several bullets reportedly landed in Bangladesh territory, which injured some local residents. Repeated bursts of gunfire and explosions were heard across the Bangladesh–Myanmar border from Ukhia, Cox's Bazar. At least 229 Myanmar Border Guard Police (BGP) personnel entered Bangladesh through the Tumbru border point seeking refuge from AA, where the Border Guard Bangladesh (BGB) disarmed them and gave them shelter in Bandarban District. On 5 February 2024, a Bangladeshi woman and a Rohingya man died from a mortar shell that fell on the Ghumdum border in Bandarban, reportedly fired by Myanmar.

On 24 January 2025, three Bangladeshis were injured in landmine explosions near the Myanmar border in Naikhongchhari, Bandarban. According to reports, the Arakan Army which controls most of the border areas with Bangladesh allegedly planted the landmines.

The Arakan Army has abducted dozens of Bangladeshi fishermen on the Naf River. As of August 2025, the AA reportedly has abducted over 244 Bangladeshi fishermen.

On 12 May 2025, AA reportedly opened fire on Bangladeshi fishermen near the border, injuring two teenagers (ages 16 and 17).

The Arakan Army has reportedly also restricted access to certain areas along the border. They said that they would take “strict actions” against local village officials if suspected of sheltering any refugees.

The war has significantly strained Bangladesh's economy by reducing formal trade with Myanmar while fueling illicit activities such as smuggling, drug trafficking, and ransom-based networks.

== Information warfare ==
A social media post in March 2024 showed the Rohingya protesting against the AA. Aung Kyaw Moe, a cabinet member of NUG, wrote in an X post that junta "is using the Rohingya as a proxy to protest against AA in Buthidang is not definitely organic." After multiple protests staged by Rohingya against the AA, some protest participants said this were forced by the junta and residents who didn't participate would be fined.

The military regime has also issued propaganda alleging AA and PDF forces are retreating or surrendering during the offensive.

Spokesman for the UN Stéphane Dujarric said their local team sees the spreading of misinformation, disinformation and hate speech in northern Rakhine State.

Groups such as ARSA, RSO, and ARA have circulated staged photos and videos taken inside Bangladesh to claim activity in northern Rakhine. However, observers report that these groups have carried out no major operations inside Rakhine apart from small-scale attacks on civilians. Militants occasionally try to enter Maungdaw Township but are pushed back by the Arakan Army and retreat across the border.
