= Battle of Maungdaw =

2024 military conflict in Myanmar

Coordinates: 20°49′N 92°22′E

- Part of Operation 1027 (Rakhine Theatre) in the Myanmar civil war
Date	21 May – 9 December 2024 (6 months, 2 weeks and 4 days)
Location	Maungdaw Township, Myanmar
Result	Arakan Army victory
Territorial changes	Arakan Army captures Maungdaw: AA gains control over Bangladesh-Myanmar border

Belligerents
State Administration Council; Arakan Rohingya Army; Arakan Rohingya Salvation Army; Rohingya Solidarity Organization	Arakan Army

Commanders and leaders
Brigadier General Thurein Tun (POW)	Twan Mrat Naing; Nyo Twan Awng

Units involved
Tatmadaw: Myanmar Army; 15th Military Operations Command Border Guard Police Units Myanmar Air Force; Rohingya Militants	Arakan Army

Casualties and losses
Ranging from 500–600 deaths 200+ Rohingyas reportedly killed Over 300 personnel taken prisoner	Arakan Army: unknown

On 21 May 2024, the Arakan Army (AA) launched its offensive in Maungdaw Township. The campaign lasted approximately six months, ultimately leading to the capture of the township on 8 December 2024, securing full control over the 271-kilometer border with Bangladesh.

== Background ==
Maungdaw is a key township in northern Rakhine State bordering Bangladesh where Rohingya community are the majority. Before the battle, Myanmar's military controlled several outposts in Maungdaw, mainly through Border Guard Police forces.

== Battle ==
The conflict began in earnest on May 21, when the Arakan Army launched a large-scale offensive targeting Maungdaw town. The initial assault focused on two key border guard police headquarters on the town’s outskirts: Battalion No. 4 in 4th Mile village and Battalion No. 5 in Myothugyi ward. AA troops advanced from multiple directions, encircling the town and engaging junta forces in intense combat. On the first day, junta jets conducted pre-dawn airstrikes on nearby villages, including Shwe Baho and Bawdhikone, to disrupt AA movements, though these strikes also caused civilian casualties and failed to halt the rebel advance.

By June, the AA had escalated its operations, issuing an evacuation warning to Maungdaw’s remaining 20,000 civilians on June 16, urging them to leave by 9 p.m. as it prepared to assault the town’s administrative center. Junta troops, expecting street battles, strengthened roads and houses by setting up barricades and defensive positions. They also used newly trained Rohingya recruits along with regular soldiers. However, the AA’s multi-pronged approach overwhelmed the defenses, capturing all junta camps in the surrounding township by late June, isolating Maungdaw town itself.

Fighting intensified in August, with a notable three-day clash from August 24 to August 26, 2024. The AA reported killing over 100 junta soldiers and capturing dozens, including members of junta-aligned Muslim militias, during this period. The rebels concentrated their attacks on the few remaining junta positions, using coordinated ground assaults supported by captured weaponry. Residents noted that the junta’s last significant stronghold in the township by this point was Border Guard Post No. 1, though it too fell under heavy AA pressure. The AA claimed that only a handful of defensive positions remained, predicting their imminent collapse.

The decisive phase of the battle occurred between October and December 2024, focusing on BGP5, a heavily fortified compound spanning 20 hectares just outside Maungdaw. The AA initiated its siege of BGP5 on October 14, facing over 700 junta personnel, including police, soldiers, and Rohingya militias from groups like the Arakan Rohingya Army (ARA), Arakan Rohingya Salvation Army (ARSA), and Rohingya Solidarity Organization (RSO). The junta had reinforced the base with deep ditches filled with spikes, over 1,000 landmines, bunkers, and reinforced buildings, creating a formidable defensive network. The AA’s advance was slow and costly, with fighters digging trenches for cover amid relentless junta airstrikes and artillery barrages.

Throughout the siege, the Myanmar air force bombarded Maungdaw and dropped supplies to BGP5 at night, though these efforts proved insufficient to sustain the defenders. By early December, the junta troops inside BGP5 were reportedly demoralized, lacking medical treatment for injuries and running low on resources despite ample rice stores.

On December 7, 2024, AA forces breached the outer defenses after 55 days of continuous fighting, exploiting weaknesses caused by the prolonged isolation of the base. The following day, December 8, the AA overran BGP5, capturing hundreds of regime personnel, including Brigadier General Thurein Tun, the outpost commander, who was apprehended while attempting to flee. Video evidence showed surrendering junta soldiers in poor condition, many injured and waving white cloths, while AA fighters documented significant caches of weapons and ammunition seized from the base. The fall of BGP5 lead the end of the battle, with the AA declaring full control of the town and the 271-kilometer Myanmar-Bangladesh border on December 9, 2024.

== Alleged alliance ==
Prior to the Arakan Army fully taking control of northern Rakhine by capturing Maungdaw township in December 2024, Rohingya armed groups had already begun repositioning themselves. They reached an understanding with the Myanmar Army and later organized a large “unity” rally in the refugee camps, where they urged Rohingya participants to join the armed effort to retake northern Rakhine. To strengthen their appeal, they enlisted religious leaders to endorse the campaign, framing it as a “jihad” against “non-believers,” a term they used in reference to the Rakhine Buddhist population.

== Aftermath ==
The battle concluded on December 8, 2024, when the Arakan Army seized Border Guard Police Battalion No. 5 (BGP5), the Myanmar military junta’s final stronghold in Maungdaw Township, Rakhine State. By December 9, the AA declared full control over Maungdaw Township and the 271-kilometer Myanmar-Bangladesh border.

Securing the Bangladesh border enhanced AA’s strategic position to granting access to trade routes and potential negotiations with neighboring countries.

According the BBC, the battle was termed as a "ferocious battle" and "perhaps the bloodiest of the civil war" since the coup in 2021.

== See also ==
- Battle of Ann
- Battle of Falam
- Bangladesh-Myanmar border
