= Myanmar Military Engineering Corps =

Engineering branch of the Myanmar Armed Forces

- စစ်အင်ဂျင်နီယာတပ်ဖွဲ့
- Shoulder sleeve insignia
- Active: c. 1949–present
- Country: Myanmar
- Branch: Tatmadaw
- Type: Military engineering
- Role: Combat engineering, construction, disaster relief, infrastructure development
- Mottos: To Move, To Fight, To Live

The Myanmar Military Engineering Corps (Burmese: စစ်အင်ဂျင်နီယာတပ်ဖွဲ့) is the engineering branch of the Tatmadaw, the armed forces of Myanmar. The corps provides combat engineering support, infrastructure development, disaster relief and humanitarian aid operations. The corps also contributes to national infrastructure projects that support both civilian and military needs.

== History ==
The corps was formed in 1947, being split from the Madras Sapper Miners Corps of British India, becoming the Burma Sapper Miners Corps. In 1949, during the start of the Myanmar civil war, the training engineer battlion in Pyin Oo Lwin foguht against the Karen National Defence Organisation, recapturing the town. This led to the Corps' establishment in 1949. For her bravery in the battle, Ma Chit Po, the wife of Corporal Hla Maung of the training engineer battalion's, was made the commander becoming the first female commander of the Military Engineering Corps in Myanmar.

In the 1990s, the corps produced LA-97 voice scramblers based on scramblers from South Africa. The Army controlled companies to purchase componets and parts and produce and test at Communications Factories in the suburbs of Yangon.

The corps is known to lay mines and operate boats, being present on the battle field prior to the Battle of Ann of the ongoing civil war in 2024. Military engineers were sent to forward outposts to protect Ann but were engaged by the opposing Arakan Army forces.

== Structure ==
As of 2021 there were 55 engineer battalions in the Tatmadaw.

The corps' new recruits are classed based on their level of educational attainment among general military eligibility requirements. Recruits with existing engineering related degrees are appointed as officers Sergeants after 3 years of military service. Like other branches of the Myanmar Army, soldiers in the corps are required to be proficient in military tactics.

== See also ==
- Tatmadaw
- Military engineering
