= Thurein Tun =

Burmese brigadier general and military officer

His Excellency Brigadier General Thurein Tun
- သူရိန်ထွန်း

Commander of the 15th Military Operations Command (MOC)
- Leader: Senior General Min Aung Hlaing
- In office 2024 – 2 May 2024
- Deputy: Soe Win (general)

Operational Commander at Central Command
- In office 2021 – 2 May 2024

Personal details
- Born: Myanmar
- Education: Officers Training School, Bahtoo; Defence Services Academy
- Occupation: Army general

Military service
- Allegiance: Tatmadaw
- Branch/service: Myanmar Army
- Rank: Brigadier General
- Unit: Central Command (Mandalay), 15th Military Operations Command (15th MOC)
- Commands: 15th Military Operations Command (15th MOC), Border Guard Police Battalion No. 5

Thurein Tun (Burmese: သူရိန်ထွန်း; pronounced [θʊreɪn tʊn], also spelled as Thurein Htun; born in Myanmar) is a Burmese army general who served as the commander of the 15th Military Operations Command (MOC) of Myanmar. He was captured by the Arakan Army (AA) during their offensive in Rakhine State in December 2024. Thurein Tun has been the subject of various allegations related to his military activities in the region.

== Early life and education ==
Thurein Tun was born and raised in Myanmar. He attended the Defence Services Academy as part of the 22nd intake, where he underwent training to become a military officer in the Myanmar Army. Upon completion of his education, he was commissioned as an officer in the Burmese military and began his career in various military roles.

== Military career ==
Thurein Tun’s military career began following his graduation from the Defence Services Academy (DSA) as part of its 22nd intake. Upon completing his training, he began his service with the Myanmar Army, where he progressed through the ranks. His early years in the military saw him stationed in various regions across Myanmar, where he gained experience in operational command and leadership.

In the years following Myanmar's 2021 military coup, Thurein Tun played a significant role in military operations as part of the Myanmar military’s efforts to respond to political unrest and opposition movements. He was assigned to Central Command, which is based in Mandalay, where he was involved in overseeing military operations in various regions.

He was later promoted to the rank of brigadier general and appointed as the commander of the 15th Military Operations Command (MOC), which was primarily based in Rakhine State.

During his tenure in Rakhine State, Thurein Tun was responsible for overseeing military operations in areas experiencing conflict with local ethnic armed groups, particularly the Arakan Army (AA). His leadership in these operations was part of the broader strategy to maintain control over key regions and respond to insurgency efforts from ethnic armed groups in Myanmar.

=== Role in Rakhine State ===
As commander of the 15th MOC, Thurein Tun was stationed in Buthidaung Township, which came under the control of the Arakan Army in May 2023. In response, he relocated his forces to Maungdaw and established a base at Border Guard Police Battalion No. 5. The region was a focal point for military operations between Myanmar’s military and the Arakan Army.

Thurein Tun was reported to have taken a series of military actions to combat the AA's advance in the region. These included the alleged conscription of local residents, including members of the Rohingya community, and the mobilization of various groups to counter the AA's progress. The Arakan Army also claimed that Thurein Tun attempted to prevent the surrender of his own soldiers during the final stages of their assault on the Border Guard Police Battalion. Following these events, Thurein Tun and a small group of soldiers reportedly fled the area, eventually being captured by the AA.

=== Capture and detention ===
In December 2024, Thurein Tun was captured by the Arakan Army following the fall of Maungdaw to AA forces. This event marked a significant development in the military conflict between Myanmar’s army and the Arakan Army. Following his capture, the AA announced their intention to investigate his role in the conflict, including his involvement in the military operations in Rakhine State.

=== Accusations and controversies ===
Thurein Tun has been associated with various allegations regarding his military actions, particularly during his tenure in Rakhine State. These concerns largely relate to his role in the military operations that took place during his command of the 15th Military Operations Command, and the broader context of Myanmar's ongoing conflict with ethnic armed groups in the region.

Human rights organizations have raised issues regarding the conduct of military operations under Thurein Tun's command. These allegations include claims of extrajudicial killings, forced recruitment, and the use of media to justify military actions. Some reports also highlighted the involvement of local civilian populations in the conflict, with claims suggesting that certain groups were allegedly mobilized for military purposes.

Additionally, concerns have been raised about the impact of military operations on local communities, particularly ethnic minorities in Rakhine State. Critics of the military's actions have highlighted the displacement of civilians and the impact of prolonged conflict on the region's stability. The broader context of these events remains a subject of ongoing scrutiny, with several reports from international bodies continuing to investigate the situation in Myanmar's conflict zones.

The National Unity Government (NUG) of Myanmar, along with several advocacy groups, has also raised concerns about the militarization of certain ethnic regions and the effects on regional security. As part of these investigations, the Arakan Army (AA) stated their intention to look into the activities of military leaders, including Thurein Tun, as part of their broader efforts to address the ongoing conflict and its impact on civilians.

These developments have attracted attention from various international and local organizations, which continue to examine the events surrounding military operations in Rakhine State. The complexities of the situation are influenced by the wider political, ethnic, and military dynamics that are ongoing in Myanmar.

=== Reception and role in the Tatmadaw ===
Thurein Tun’s role in Myanmar's military and his actions during his tenure as commander of the 15th Military Operations Command have been viewed differently by various groups. Within Myanmar’s military establishment, he is seen as a committed officer fulfilling his duties within the larger framework of the Tatmadaw. His involvement in military operations in Rakhine State, particularly in the conflict with the Arakan Army, has been a subject of differing perspectives.

Some supporters of the military’s actions in the region maintain that these operations were necessary for maintaining control and addressing security concerns. Others, including international human rights organizations, have expressed concerns about the impact of these operations on local communities and the broader stability of the region.

The differing viewpoints surrounding his actions highlight the complexities of the ongoing conflict in Rakhine State and the broader political situation in Myanmar. His role continues to be part of the wider discourse on the military’s actions and policies within the country.

== Personal life ==
Information about Thurein Tun's personal life remains relatively private. As with many military figures, details regarding his family and personal relationships have not been widely shared in the public domain.
