= Arakan Mountains =

Mountain range in western Myanmar

- Rakhine Mountains
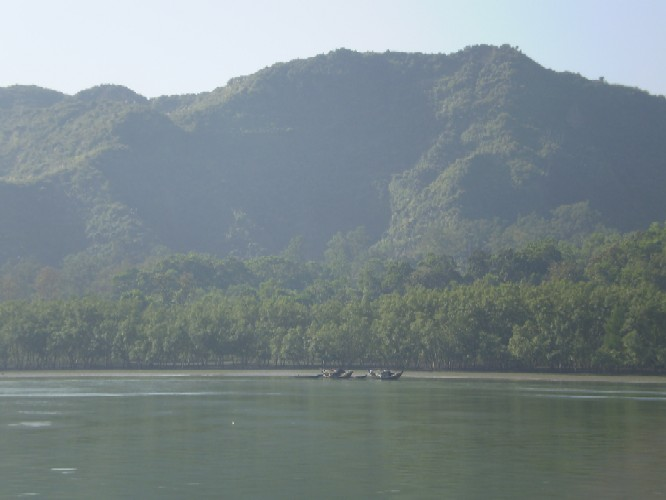
- View of the Arakan Mountains in Maungdaw district rising above the banks of the Naf River

Highest point
- Peak: Mount Victoria
- Elevation: 3,094 m (10,151 ft)
- Coordinates: 21°25′46.36″N 93°49′10.75″E

Naming
- Native name: ရခိုင်ရိုးမ (Burmese)

Geography
- Location within Myanmar
- Country: Myanmar
- State: Rakhine State
- Range coordinates: 21°16′N 93°57′E

Geology
- Rock type(s): metamorphic and tightly folded sedimentary rocks over crystalline basement

The Arakan Mountains, natively referred as Rakhine Yoma (Burmese: ရခိုင်ရိုးမ) and technically known as the Southern Indo-Burman Range, are a mountain range in western Myanmar, between the coast of Rakhine State and the Central Myanmar Basin, in which flows the Irrawaddy River. It is the most prominent of a series of parallel ridges that arc through Assam, Nagaland, Manipur, Mizoram and Myanmar.

The Arakan Mountains run from Cape Negrais in the south to Manipur, India in the north. They include the Naga Hills, the Chin Hills, and the Patkai range which includes the Lushai Hills. The mountain chain is submerged in the Bay of Bengal for a long stretch and emerges again in the form of the Andaman and Nicobar Islands.

== Etymology ==
The word Arakan is derived from the Sanskrit word Rakshasa (राक्षस) meaning demon, a term used to refer to the inhabitants of the region.

== Geology and formation ==
The Arakan Mountains and the parallel arcs to the west and east were formed by compression as the Indian Plate collided with the Eurasian Plate approximately along the boundary between India and Myanmar which produced the Naga-Patkai foldbelt.

== High points ==
The Arakan Mountain Range is over 600 miles (950 km) long, with about 250 miles (400 km) of actual mountains. The highest point in the range is Khonu Msung (or Mount Victoria) at 3,094 metres (10,151 ft).

== Infrastructure ==
The Arakan Mountains are crossed by a road between Ann and Minbu and by an all-weather road from Taungup to Pyay on the Irrawaddy.

== History ==
The Arakan Mountains divide the Rakhine coast from the rest of Myanmar, and thus have acted as a barrier between the peoples of central Myanmar and those of the Indian subcontinent. This played a role in fostering the separate development of the Rakhine people, both linguistically and culturally, from the Burmese. The Arakan Mountains also served as a barrier inhibiting Burmese invasions, and allowing Arakan to develop as a separate political entity. Thus the coastal cities, such as Mrauk U and Waithali, formed the core of Arakan civilization.

There were fierce battles in these mountains between January 1943 and March 1944 during the Japanese occupation of Burma. The Japanese 33rd and 55th Divisions faced the British military on the coastal side of the range. The British forces won.

As of 2026, across the Arakan Mountain Range, the Arakan Army, Student Armed Force, and allied Chin groups have taken territorial control and defensive lines to limit Junta advances.

== Ecology ==
The Arakan Mountains act as a barrier to the southwestern monsoon rains and thus shield the central Myanmar area, making their western slopes extraordinarily wet during the monsoon with typically over 1 metre (39 in) of rain per month, and the eastern slopes much drier. They include the Chin Hills-Arakan Yoma montane forests ecoregion which is home to an elephant population and also the critically endangered Arakan forest turtle which was considered extinct until its rediscovery in 1994.
