= Mayu Frontier District =

Administrative division of Burma (1961–1964)

Mayu Frontier Administration မေယုနယ်ခြားခရိုင်
- Administrative zone of Burma
- 1961–1964
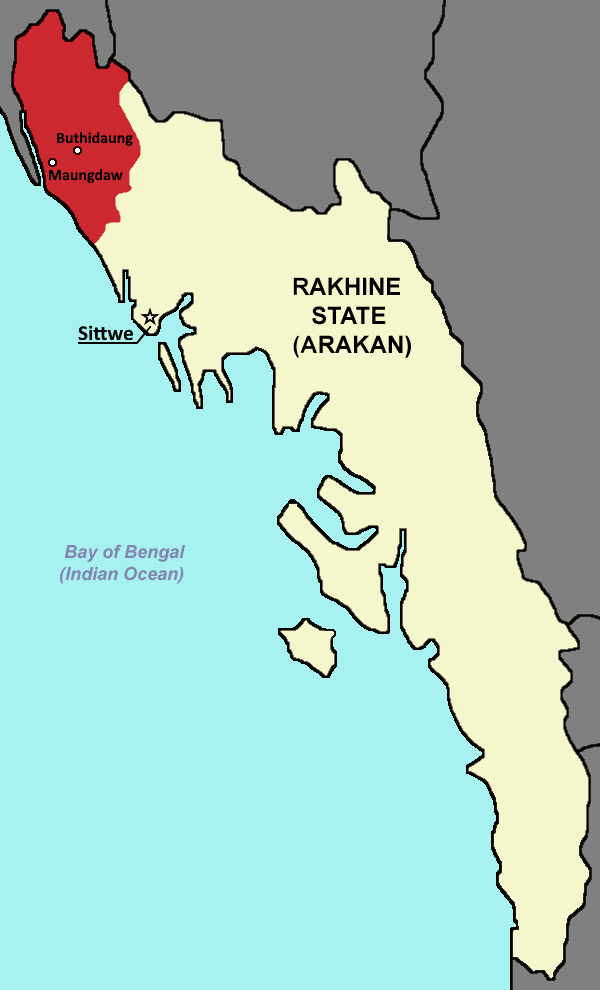
- Map of Rakhine State with the Mayu Frontier District highlighted in red
- Historical era: Post-independence Burma; Socialist Burma
  - Established: 1 May 1961
  - Disestablished: February 1964

The Mayu Frontier District (Burmese: မေယုနယ်ခြားခရိုင်) was an administrative division of Burma (present-day Myanmar) that existed between 1961 and 1964. It covered the Maungdaw District of present-day Rakhine State in the historical region of Arakan. The zone was administered directly from the capital Rangoon (present-day Yangon).

== Geography ==
The Mayu Frontier District was named after the Mayu River. It included Maungdaw Township, Buthidaung Township and a part of Rathedaung Township. The Mayu Range of mountains separated Maungdaw and Buthidaung. The Naf River estuary formed the northern boundary of the district, on the international border with East Pakistan.

== Background ==
After the 1960 Burmese general election, Sultan Mahmud, the Burmese health minister, advocated a state for the Rohingya community in the northern part of Arakan. Mahmud suggested the Kaladan River as the boundary between Muslim-majority and Buddhist-majority Arakan. Mahmud submitted his proposal to the Statehood Consultative Committee. Mahmud said that Rohingyas would accept a joint state with Arakanese Buddhists if there was adequate protection and representation of the Rohingya. If adequate safeguards were not possible, Mahmud proposed that a separate northern Arakan zone should be administered directly from the national capital Rangoon.

On 1 May 1961, the Prime Minister of Burma U Nu implemented Mahmud's ideas, albeit the new zone did not extend up to the Kaladan River.

== Demographics ==
The Mayu Frontier District had a Rohingya majority, among whom most were Muslim. During this period, the term "Rohingya" was widely used, including in the speeches of Burmese leaders and on Burmese radio broadcasts. The term was popularized by M. A. Gaffar after he submitted a memorandum to the first Burmese government in 1949.

== Administration ==
Between 1961 and 1962, the Mayu Frontier District was governed by the elected government in Rangoon. The 1962 Burmese coup d'état ended Burmese parliamentary democracy. Following the coup, the Mayu Frontier District was directly administered by the Tatmadaw (Myanmar Armed Forces) and the Union Revolutionary Council.

== Dissolution ==
The Burmese military ended the special status of the district in February 1964. The Mayu Frontier area was placed under the responsibility of the Ministry of Home Affairs. In 1974, when Burmese dictator Ne Win proclaimed the Socialist Republic of the Union of Burma, the Mayu Frontier area was incorporated into Arakan State as the Maungdaw District.

== See also ==
- Arakan Division
