= Abeuk =

- Village
- Location in Burma
- Coordinates: 20°7′N 93°54′E
- Country: Burma
- Region: Rakhine State
- District: Kyaukpyu District
- Township: Ann Township
- Time zone: UTC+6:30 (MST)

Abeuk is a village in Ann Township in the Rakhine State of western Burma. It is located approximately 120 kilometres east of Sittwe. It lies in the Arakan Roma mountain range.
