= Ann District =

Township and District in Rakhine State, Myanmar

Ann Township Ann District အမ်းမြို့နယ် အမ်းခရိုင်
- Township and District
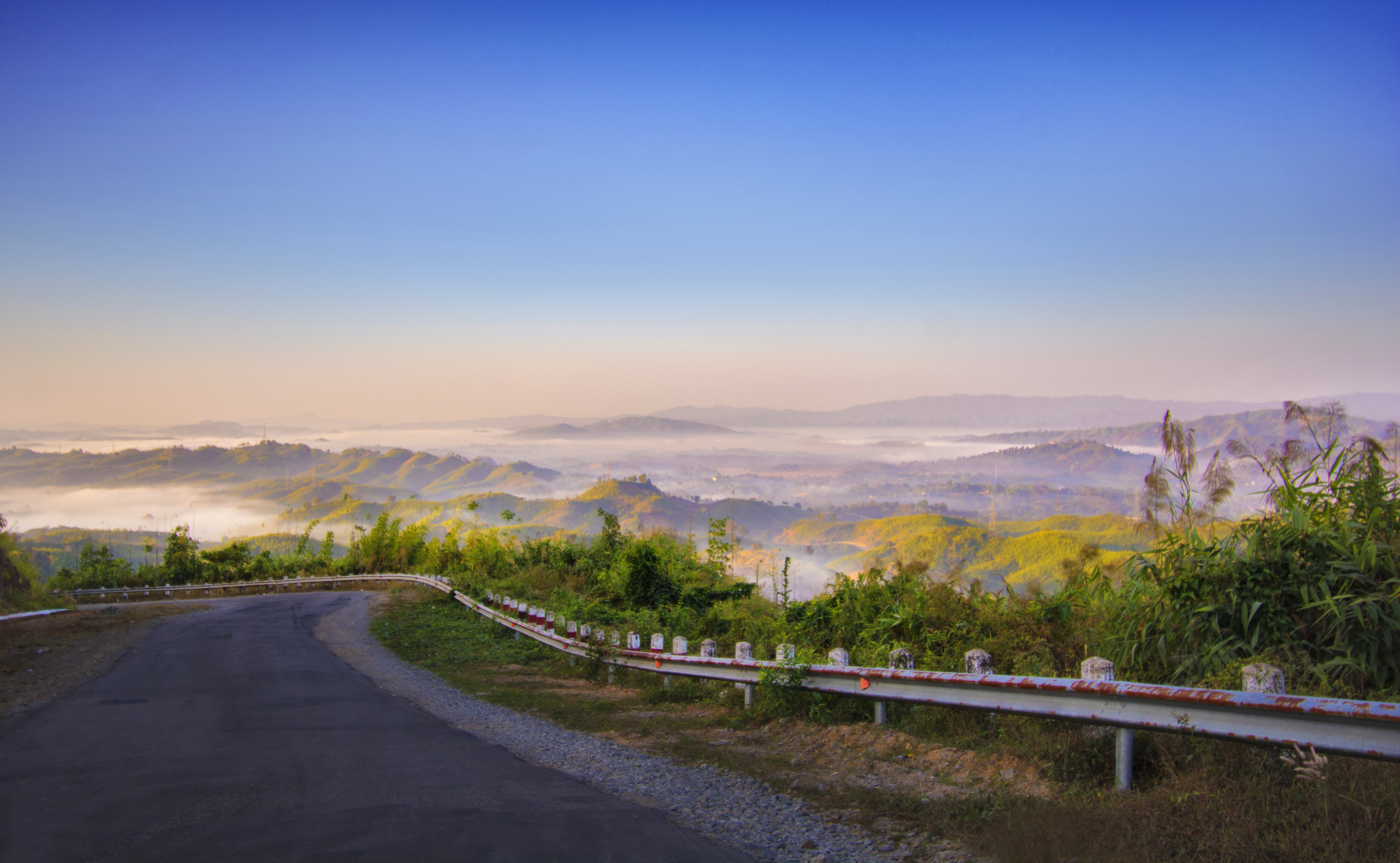
- Ann-Minbu Road

- Location in Rakhine State
- Coordinates: 19°51′N 94°00′E
- Country: Myanmar
- State: Rakhine State
- District: Ann District
- Capital: Ann

Area
  - Total: 2,316.88 sq mi (6,000.7 km^{2})

Population (2023)
  - Total: 124,137
  - Density: 53.5794/sq mi (20.6871/km^{2})
- Time zone: UTC+6:30 (MMT)

Ann Township (Burmese: အမ်းမြို့နယ်) is the only township in Ann District (Burmese: အမ်းခရိုင်), central Rakhine State, Myanmar. The principal town and district capital is Ann. Founded in 1333 AD in King Min Hti.

== Demographics ==
The township and district contains two towns, the capital Ann and the town of Tattaung, comprising 7 urban wards. It also contains 29 village tracts that group 242 villages together. The township had a total of 124,137 people in 2023. The majority of the township are Buddhists and of the Arakanese ethnic group.

== History ==
In the year 1327, the Pinya Kingdom and Shan kingdoms attacked Ramree Island and carried away number of inhabitants. In retaliation, Min Hti of Mrauk-U ordered his army to cross the Arakan Mountains to raid and annex Thayet, capturing the governor of Thayet and bringing his family back. On the return from this campaign, Min Hti founded the town of Ann, lying below the Arakan Mountains in 1334/1335, as a stopover in the passage through the Arakan Mountains leading to Minbu.

Hla Maung Tin, an elected Rakhine State Hluttaw Member of Ann Township representing Union Solidarity and Development Party in 2010 election, served as the 1st Rakhine State Chief Minister from 2011 to June 2014.

Ann Township was designated into its own district in 2022.

Ann's location is strategically important as the link between Rakhine and Magway via the Minbu-Ann road through the Arakan Mountains and as a gateway preventing AA from attacking southern Rakhine State. Ann is also the headquarters of the Myanmar Army's Western Regional Military Command. In late December 2024, the Arakan Army captured the town and its command headquarters during the Battle of Ann as part of the broader Rakhine offensive beginning in November 2023.

== Economy ==
"Ann Creek" Hydropower Project is being implemented by the Ministry of Electric Power No. 1 on Ann Creek, 3.5 miles northeast to Ann. The project can generate 44 million kilowatt hours yearly when it is finished.
