= Bangladesh–Myanmar border =

International border

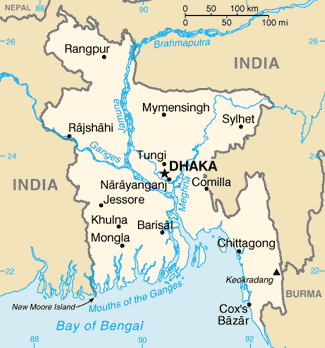
- Map of Bangladesh, with Myanmar to the south-east

Characteristics
- Entities: Bangladesh Myanmar
- Length: 271 kilometres (168 mi)

History
- Current shape: Under control of Border Guard Bangladesh and Arakan Army

The Bangladesh–Myanmar border is the international border between the countries of Bangladesh and Myanmar (formerly Burma). The border stretches 271.0 kilometres (168.4 miles), from the tripoint with India in the north to the Bay of Bengal in the south. About 210 km (130 mi) of the border is fenced, with the government of Myanmar announcing in 2017 that it was planning to fence off the rest of the border.

On 9 December 2024, Arakan Army captured all of the Burmese military outposts and seized control of Myanmar's border with Bangladesh after an intense battle in Maungdaw.

== Description ==
The border starts in the north at the tripoint with Mizoram, India. It then proceeds southwards overland before turning west at a point west of Paletwa. The border then proceeds to the west, north-west and then south in a broad arc before reaching the Naf River. The border then follows this wide river southwards out to the Bay of Bengal.

At present, the border from the Myanmar side is closed to foreign nationals.

== History ==
Historically the border region has been a contested area located at the edge of the various Indian and Burmese empires. Britain had begun conquering India (including modern Bangladesh) in the 17th century, and gradually took control of most of the country, forming British India. From the 1820s-80s, Britain also gradually conquered Burma; by the Treaty of Yandabo in 1826, which ended the First Anglo-Burmese War, Burma recognised British control over Assam, Manipur, Rakhine (Arakan), and the Taninthayi coast, thereby delimiting much of the Indo-Burmese modern boundary in general terms. Large swathes of Burma were annexed following the Second Anglo-Burmese War of 1852–53. The remainder of Burma was conquered in 1885 and incorporated into British India. Further Indo-Burmese boundary modifications were made in 1894, 1896, 1901, 1921 and 1922.

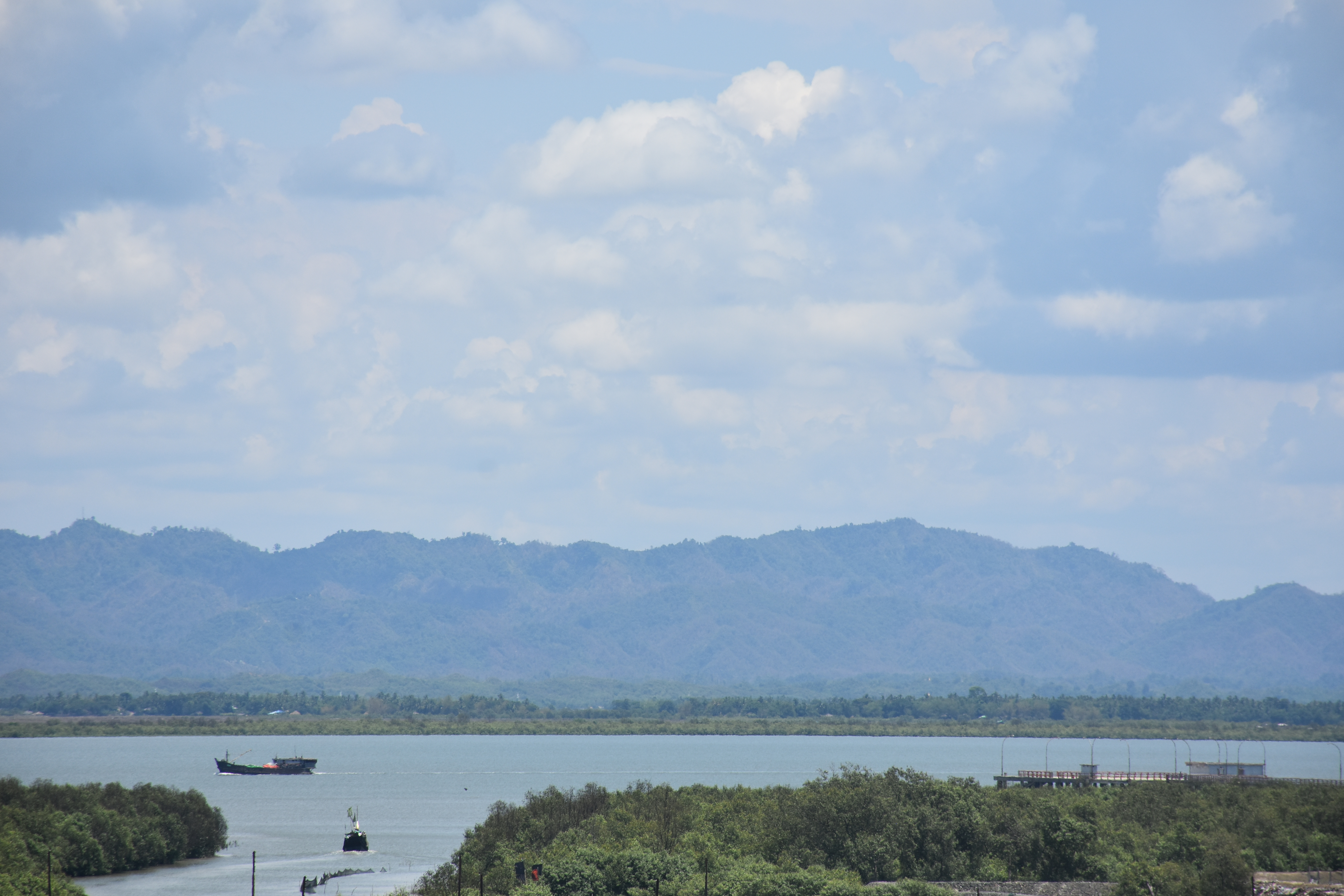
The border between Bangladesh and Myanmar near the BGB Ghat, Teknaf, Cox's Bazar, Bangladesh.

In 1937, Burma was split off from India and became a separate colony. In 1947, India gained independence; however, the country was split into two states (India and Pakistan), with the southernmost section of the Burma-India border becoming that between Burma and East Pakistan (modern Bangladesh). Burma gained independence in 1948. In 1971, Bangladesh gained independence from Pakistan after a war and thereby inherited the border with Burma.

Since then, the boundary area has often been unstable owing to armed conflicts such as the Chittagong Hill Tracts conflict (1977–1997) in south-east Bangladesh and the Rohingya conflict in Myanmar's Rakhine state. The latter has been ongoing for decades yet has reached a particular intensity since 2016. The latest round of fighting has resulted in Rohingya refugees crossing the border from Myanmar into Bangladesh. Bangladesh and Myanmar agreed to close their borders during sudden influxes of Rohingya refugees. On Myanmar's side of the border in Maungdaw District, 80 percent of the population is Rohingya.

On 9 December 2024, the Arakan Army (AA) gained full control of Myanmar's 270-kilometer-long border with Bangladesh, capturing Maungdaw Township and the Border Guard Police Battalion No. 5 after months of intense fighting. With this victory, the AA currently controls all three Burmese townships bordering Bangladesh: Maungdaw, Buthidaung, and Paletwa.

Bangladeshi Home Affairs Adviser Jahangir Alam stated that Bangladeshi traders have to now pay taxes twice when importing goods from Myanmar, first to its government at Sittwe and then to the Arakan Army at the Naf River between the Bangladesh-Myanmar border.

== Incidents ==
On 28 May 2014, members of the Myanmar's Border Guard Police (BGP) opened fire on a Border Guards Bangladesh (BGB) patrol, killing one. In a flag-meeting between the border forces of the two countries, Myanmar regretted the killing and admitted that they had mistaken the patrol for Rohingya separatists. In 2015, an armed clash occurred on the border between the Arakan Army and the BGB. In 2022, Myanmar Armed Forces (Tatmadaw) bombed the Bangladesh border after the Arakan Army seized a Myanmar police outpost in Maungdaw town in Rakhine State, according to a Prothom Alo news report. In February 2024, during combat between Arakan Army and BGP, at least 264 Myanmar military personnel sought refuge in Bangladesh, where they were disarmed and sheltered by the BGB.

The Arakan Army is also used to detaining Bangladeshi fishermen along the border from Naf river, abducting over 399 since it took control of the Myanmar side of border. They have reportedly also shot at Bangladeshi civilians and seized boats and goods during these incidents. Multiple civilians nearby the border has been injured due to landmines.

== See also ==
- Bangladesh–Myanmar relations
- Transport in Bangladesh
- Transport between India and Bangladesh
