= Honey Nway Oo =

Burmese actress and activist (born 1999)

- ဟန်နီနွေဦး
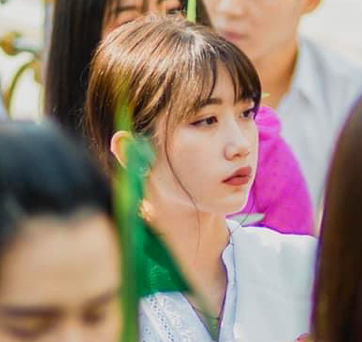
- Honey in 2020
- Born: Honey Nway Oo; Yangon, Myanmar
- Education: Yangon University of Foreign Languages
- Occupations: Revolutionary, former actress
- Years active: 2019–2021

Honey Nway Oo (Burmese: ဟန်နီနွေဦး) is a former Burmese actress and current officer in the Student Armed Force (SAF). Initially working in acting, she openly opposed the Tatmadaw following the 2021 Myanmar coup d'état, and left her acting career to join the SAF; a warrant was issued for her arrest. Honey has been regarded as one of the most prominent revolutionaries in Myanmar and is often called the "people's girl" for her role in anti-coup movements.

== Early life and education ==
Honey Nway Oo studied at Yangon University of Foreign Languages (YUFL), where she earned a B.A. (German) in 2020. She was picked as the "university's beauty queen" as a freshman at the university. In 2018, she founded the first YUFL football team and served as its captain.

== Acting career ==
While studying German at YUFL, Honey began modelling for local magazines and music videos in 2019. She appeared in over 20 TV commercials and was a brand endorser for Oppo. She made her acting debut in a main role in the 2020 film Yangon In Love. She participated in the non-profit organization Care Teen, which provides school supplies and health and education services to underprivileged children.

== Revolution career ==
In the aftermath of the 2021 Myanmar coup d'état, Honey organized anti-coup protests and left for the jungle. She, along with several other celebrities, was charged with calling for participation in the Civil Disobedience Movement (CDM), damaging the state's ability to govern, supporting the Committee Representing Pyidaungsu Hluttaw, and generally inciting the people to disturb the peace and stability of the nation.

She received military training from Rakhine State and worked with her unit to resist Myanmar military in cooperation with the Arakan Army.

Honey later joined the Student Armed Force and is currently serving as a senior officer.
