= Battle of Ann =

2024 battle in Myanmar

Coordinates: 19°47′N 94°2′E

- Part of Operation 1027 (Rakhine Theatre) in the Myanmar civil war
| Date | 26 September – 20 December 2024 (2 months, 3 weeks and 3 days) |
| Location | Ann, Ann Township |
| Result | Arakan Army victory |
| Territorial changes | Arakan Army captures Ann |

Belligerents
| State Administration Council | Arakan Army; People's Defense Force; Chinland Defense Force |

Commanders and leaders
| Brig. Gen. Thaung Tun (POW); Brig. Gen. Kyaw Kyaw Than (POW); Col. Thet Htoo San (POW) | Twan Mrat Naing; Nyo Twan Awng |

Units involved
| Tatmadaw: Myanmar Army; Western Command; Myanmar Air Force; Myanmar Police Force | Arakan Army; People's Defense Force: People's Independence Army; Minbu District Battalion-2; Student Armed Force; Asho Chin Defence Force |

Casualties and losses
| Tatmadaw: 300 surrendered | Arakan Army: unknown |

In September 2024, the Arakan Army (AA) launched an offensive to capture the town of Ann in Myanmar, the location of the headquarters of the Myanmar military's Western Command. The battle was a culmination of a year-long offensive by the Arakan Army to capture the entirety of Rakhine State. The battle ultimately resulted in the total defeat of junta forces on 20 December 2024 and the capture of Ann and Ann Airport by Arakan Army forces.

== Background ==
Ann is a strategically located town that connects Rakhine State with central Myanmar. The town hosted the junta's Western Command headquarters, together with many other military facilities (Light Infantry Battalions 371, 372, 323; Field medical battalion and a logistics battalion). It also hosts Ann Airport.

The Arakan Army began the offensive to capture the township on 24 March 2024, as part of the larger Rakhine offensive. The offensive started in November 2023, concurrently with Operation 1027 launched by the Three Brotherhood Alliance, which the Arakan Army is a member of. By November 2024, they controlled Northern Rakhine State and most of the central and southern part of it. To stop the ethnic army advance, the military junta conducted airstrikes using jet fighters, Y-12 and Y-8 aircraft. Media reported that the regime was using 600 forcibly conscripted Rohingya men to defend Ann and Taungup.

The Student Armed Force and other resistance groups, including the People's Defense Forces, from Magway Region, would fight alongside the Arakan Army in Ann.

== Battle ==
Beginning on 26 September 2024, the Arakan Army launched an offensive against military bases around Ann. On 1 October the Arakan Army launched an attack on the Mae Taung tactical operation command, a military installation near Ann, and captured the base on 7 October despite heavy air and artillery bombardment from junta forces. The Arakan Army subsequently captured several bases in the surrounding area in the proceeding weeks. Mae Taung was an important defensive bulwark for the junta's Western Command headquarters in Ann, and its capture allowed for the Arakan Army to attack Ann proper. During the course of the battle, the junta ordered the evacuation of nearby villages, and allegedly conducted airstrikes against civilian targets following the Taung base's fall.

Following the fall of Mae Taung, government employees in Ann began to flee the town as fighting drew closer, while junta troops began restricting movement for civilians. Fighting continued as the Arakan Army continued to seize military bases outside of the town, capturing two on 11 October. On 12 October, the junta cut internet and phone services in most of Rakhine. Fighting continued throughout October as the Arakan Army continued to close in on the town, with clashes throughout nearby villages. On 20 October, artillery struck the Western Command's military hospital, causing doctors and patients to evacuate to the town's school. The general hospital in the town was also closed due to the fighting. According to Narinjara News, by 24 October two-thirds of the town's population had fled, while those who remained were suffering from acute food shortages.

By 21 October, the Arakan Army had begun attacking the Western Command headquarters near the town. The group had reportedly completely surrounded Ann and occupied Ann Airport. The Arakan Army intensified its attacks on junta installations, defeating military forces stationed around the Western Command headquarters. The Irrawaddy reported on 28 October that only 3,000 residents remained in the town. They also reported that troops within the Western Command were divided, with a group seeking to surrender while others wished to fight on. By the end of October, three-quarters of battalions under the command of the Western Command had reportedly fallen to the Arakan Army. On 6 November, another of the remaining battalions defending the Western Command headquarters was captured. On 10 November, the Arakan Army shot down a Mi-17 helicopter being used to bring supplies into the besieged town. By this time, only two bases in the town remained occupied by junta forces. Later that month, the Student Armed Force, Minbu District Battalion-2 (PDF unit), and Asho Chin Defence Force (CDF unit) ambushed and largely captured a group of junta soldiers who were trying to escape from Ann.

By 14 November only two of the remaining 10 junta positions in Ann hosted combat forces, while the rest housed auxiliary units. Rakhine media reported that around 300 junta troops, including majors, surrendered to the Arakan Army while around 3,000 residents remained trapped in Ann due to the fighting.

By 26 November frequent clashes were being reported in mountainous areas along the Ann-Padan Road on the border between Rakhine State and Magway Region as local resistance groups attempted to prevent junta reinforcements and supplies from reaching the town.

On 20 December, the Arakan Army said it had seized the headquarters of the Western Command, resulting in the full capture of Ann.

== See also ==
- Rakhine offensive (2023–present)
- Battle of Maungdaw
