= Rohingya Islami Mahaz =

Islamist insurgent group in Myanmar

- روہنگیا اسلامی محاذ
- Flag used by Rohingya Islami Mahaz
- Leader: Mowlana Abdul Hamid
- Dates active: 2020– present
- Headquarters: Rohingya refugee camps
- Active regions: Bangladesh–Myanmar border
- Ideology: Islamism; Separatism
- Size: Unknown

The Rohingya Islami Mahaz, (Rohingya Arabic script: روہنگیا اسلامی محاذ) (lit. 'Rohingya Islamic Front'), commonly known as 'Islami Mahaz' is a Rohingya Islamist insurgent group which is allied with the Rohingya Solidarity Organization

== Foundation ==
The organization was founded in Rohingya refugee camp in Bangladesh. It owns several madrasa in Bangladesh. The organization is reportedly led by Maulvi Selim Ullah.

== Insurgent activities ==
In the middle of 2020, a video was posted on YouTube where it was seen that the Rohingya Islami Mahaz perpetrated a bombing, targeting the Myanmar military. It was responsible for killing of alleged ARSA supporters in Bangladesh refugee camps.

== Conflict with ARSA ==
A madrasa owned by Islami Mahaz was attacked and many students were killed. Islami Mahaz blamed ARSA for the attack. The group was reportedly allied with RSO against ARSA.

In February 2025, all three groups along with the ARA came together and formed the Four Brothers Alliance.
