= Arakan Rohingya Army =

Rohingya nationalist group

- Leaders: Nabi Hossain; Abdullah Kane
- Dates active: 2020–present
- Active regions: Bangladesh–Myanmar border; Northern Rakhine State
- Ideology: Rohingya nationalism
- Size: Approximately 30

The Arakan Rohingya Army (ARA) is an ethnic Rohingya insurgent group founded by Nabi Hossain.

== Formation ==
Formed in September 2020, ARA claimed that its fighters were based in Rakhine State and that it promised equal rights for everyone. Its leaders, Nabi Hossain and Abdullah Kane, are wanted by Bangladeshi authorities for drug smuggling and mafia-like activities.

== Conflict ==
The group started fighting against the Arakan Rohingya Salvation Army after peace activist, Mohib Ullah, was allegedly killed by the latter group on 29 September 2021.

On 6 February 2024 the Arakan Army and the RSO cooperated on a joint assault against ARA, who had captured a Border Guard Police camp along the Bangladesh-Myanmar border during the Rakhine Offensive. During the month of April, ARSA and ARA reportedly fought with the Tatmadaw against AA in Buthidaung, where they burnt down homes and kidnapped civilians. According to statements from both AA and Rohingya refugees, ARA forcibly recruits young men to fight with the Myanmar military.

On 30 August 2024, Nabi Hossain was arrested by the Armed Police Battalion.

In 2025, Nabi Hossain was released on bail and subsequently went into hiding. ARA later clashed with AA from 11-13 January 2026 before fleeing to Bangladesh.

On 5 May, 2026, the brother of Nabi Hossain, Mohammad Kamal, was shot dead by allegedly 12-13 members of the Rohingya Solidarity Organisation while he was returning from prayers at a mosque. Simultaneously, Kefayet Ullah Halim (the reported leader of ARA's former political wing, ARO [Arakan Rohingya Organisation]) was assassinated by gunmen; the killing was allegedly carried out by ARSA.
