= Student Armed Force =

Armed resistance organization in Myanmar

- ကျောင်းသားလက်ရုံးတပ်တော်
- Flag Badge Flag of the Student Armed Force
- Leader: Min Latt Okkar (commander-in-chief)
- Founded: 27 April 2021
- Active regions: Rakhine State; Sagaing Region; Magway Region
- Size: 1,000+

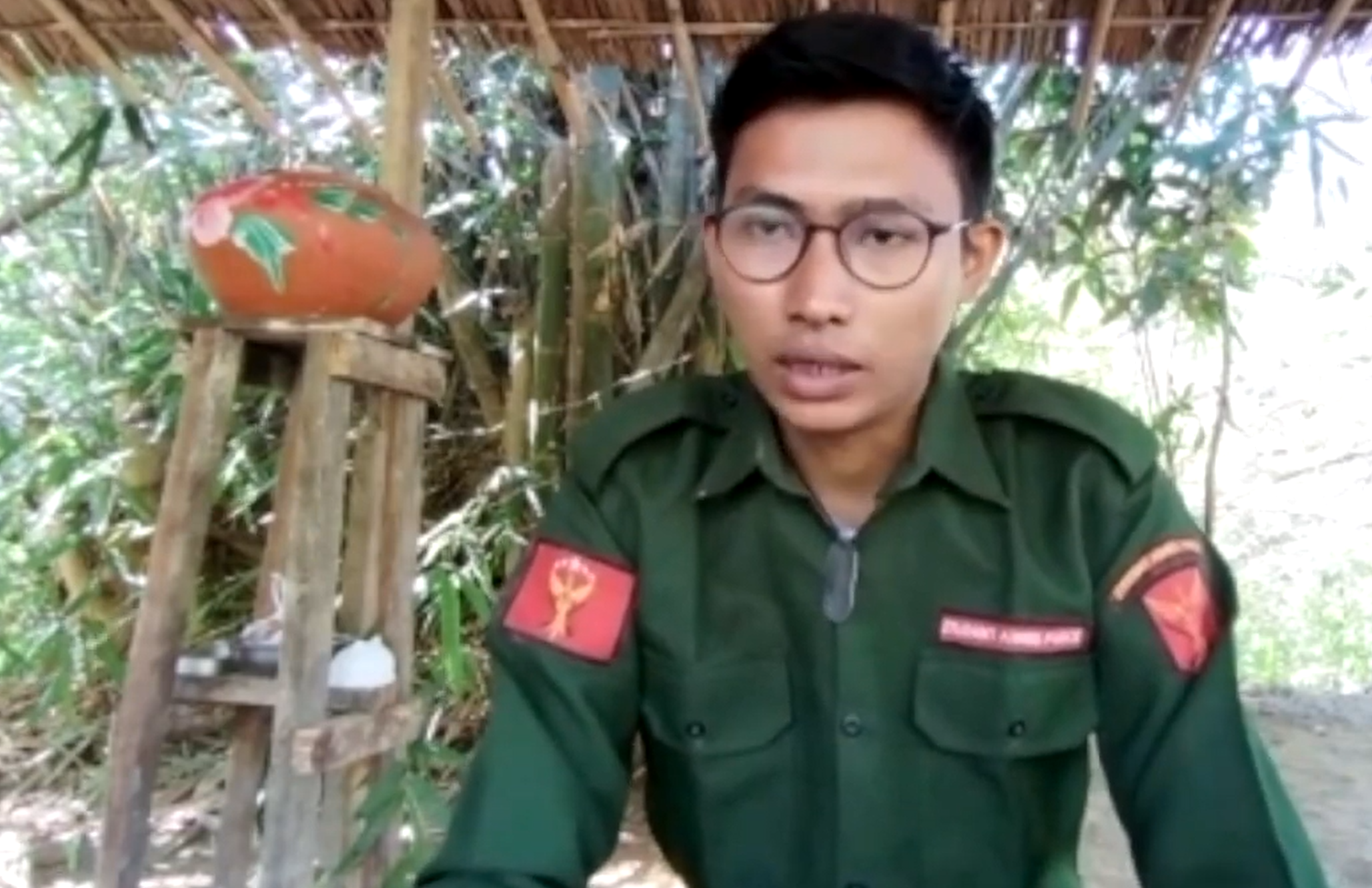
Min Latt Okkar during an interview with Myanmar Now

The Student Armed Force (Burmese: ကျောင်းသားလက်ရုံးတပ်တော်, Kyāungthā Letyōn Tattaw; abbreviated SAF or ကလတ) is an armed resistance organization in Myanmar.

== History ==
In response to the 2021 Myanmar coup d'état, members of Yangon-based University Student Unions learned basic military training in the liberated area of the Arakan Army, and with the support of the Arakan Army formed the Student Armed Force on April 27, 2021, with 21 young students.

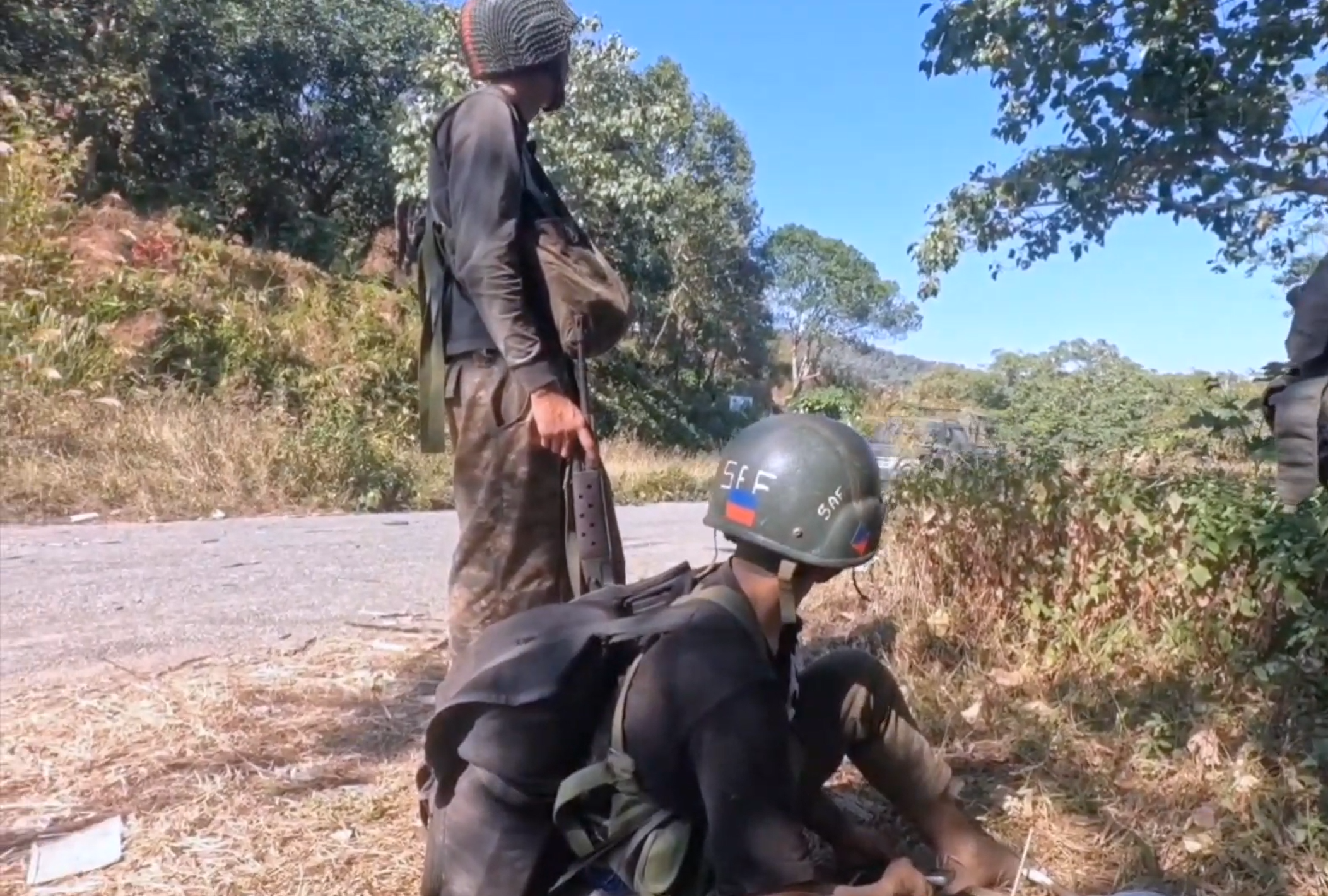
SAF fighting with its ally troop Arakan Army

On 24 January 2022, the Student Armed Force carried out an assault on a 60-soldier Tamadaw column in the jungles of Magway Region, resulting in nine fatalities among the Tamadaw troops. Former actress Honey Nway Oo is currently serving as a senior officer in the force.
