= Ann, Myanmar =

Ann အမ်းမြို့
- Town
- Location in Myanmar (Burma)
- Coordinates: 19°47′N 94°2′E
- Country: Myanmar
- Division: Rakhine State
- District: Ann District
- Township: Ann Township

Population (2014 census)
  - Total: 119,714
- Time zone: UTC+6.30 (MMT)

Ann (Burmese: အမ်းမြို့) is a town in Rakhine State, Myanmar (Burma). It has a population of 119,714 and is served by Ann Airport. It hosts the general headquarters of the Myanmar Army's Western Command.

== History ==
The Town was founded by King Min Hti around early 14th century. Starting on 26 September 2024, the town has been the site of the Battle of Ann between the Arakan Army and Myanmar's ruling military junta.
