= Maungdaw District =

Maungdaw District မောင်တောခရိုင်
- District
- Location of Maungdaw District (red) in Rakhine State (blue)
- Coordinates: 21°00′N 92°23′E
- Country: Myanmar
- Division: Rakhine State
- Capital: Maungdaw
- Time zone: UTC+6:30 (MMT)

Maungdaw District (Burmese: မောင်တောခရိုင်) is a district of Rakhine State in western Myanmar (Burma). Its capital city is Maungdaw and the population density is about 295 persons per square kilometer. It is the district with the highest percentage of Muslims in Myanmar. In recent history, many Muslims have fled from this region to neighbouring Bangladesh, mostly as refugees to seek peace and shelter from the Burmese military mass killings. Along with parts of neighbouring Sittwe District, Maungdaw District is also informally referred to as Northern Rakhine State.

== History ==
During British colonial time, Maungdaw District was originally called Buthidaung Subdivision, comprising the two townships of Maungdaw and Buthidaung, which occupies the north-western quarter of the Akyab district. The subdivision was constituted in 1906. It is bounded on the north by Chittagong Hill Tracts. It mentioned the demographic of 90% of the inhabitants are Chittagonians, British records compiling the census of entire Akyab District labeling Chittagonians as "Mohammedans" in their 1871, 1901 and 1911 which saw the increasing Chittagonian population was the half size of general Arakanese population around that time and the reason for this was district bordering Chittagong saw large influx of migrants and labor needed in Arakan. Sir Arthur Purves Phayre wrote "They (Arakanese) have so got out of the habit of doing hard manual labour that they are now absolutely dependent on the Chittagonian coolies to help them over the most arduous of their agricultural operations, ploughing, reaping and earthwork. "Since 1879 immigration has taken place on a much larger scale and the descendants of the slaves are residents. Maungdaw township has been overrun by Chittagonians. Buthidaung is not far behind, and new arrivals will be found in almost every part of the district.

== Demographics ==
Approximately 91% of Maungdaw District’s population is Muslim, giving it the highest Muslim proportion of any district in Myanmar. Most of the people belong to the Rohingya ethnic group closely related to Bengalis.

== Townships ==
The district contains the following townships:

- Maungdaw Township
- Buthidaung Township

== See also ==
- Mayu Frontier District
