= Border Guard Police =

- Flag of Myanmar Border Guard Police
- Founded: 2014–present
- Country: Myanmar
- Branch: Special Department of the Myanmar Police Force
- Type: Border guard
- Part of: Myanmar Police Force
- Nickname: BGP

Commanders
- Current commander: Brig. Gen. Myint Toe

Insignia
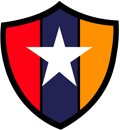
- Emblem

The Border Guard Police (Burmese: နယ်ခြားစောင့်ရဲတပ်ဖွဲ့; abbreviated BGP) is the border security department of Myanmar Police Force.

== Duties ==
The BGP is specialised in border control, counterinsurgency, crowd control and security checkpoints in border areas and insurgent areas, gathering intelligence in local areas to counterinsurgency and counter perpetrators in border areas, internal security, law enforcement in border areas and insurgency areas, operating in mountainous forest areas, and protecting agency assets in risky areas.

In addition to border security, the BGP are also responsible for manning checkpoints and documenting the movement of Rohingyas within Rakhine State.

== Operation ==
The BGP operate in northern Rakhine State and are especially active along the Bangladesh–Myanmar border, due to the ongoing exodus of Rohingya people fleeing sectarian violence in Myanmar.

== Incidents ==
In 2017, insurgents of the Arakan Rohingya Salvation Army have repeatedly attacked BGP posts along the Bangladesh–Myanmar border in revenge for the BGP's mistreatment of the Rohingya.

In 2024, at least 264 Border Guard Police (BGP) and Myanmar Army fled to Bangladesh amid reports of heavy gunfights between the government troops and the Arakan Army in Myanmar civil war.
