= Buthidaung Township =

Township in Rakhine State, Myanmar

Buthidaung Township ဘူးသီးတောင်မြို့နယ်
- Township
- Location of Buthidaung Township (red) in Maungdaw District
- Coordinates: 21°02′N 92°35′E
- Country: Myanmar
- State: Rakhine
- District: Maungdaw
- Capital: Buthidaung

Population (2024)
  - Total: 206,000
  - Ethnicities: 70% Rohingya; 25% Rakhine; 5% Others
- Time zone: UTC+6:30 (MMT)

Buthidaung Township (Rakhine and Burmese: ဘူးသီးတောင်မြို့နယ်; Burmese: [búðídàʊɰ̃ mjo̰nɛ̀]) is a township of Maungdaw District in Rakhine State, Myanmar (Burma). The administrative seat is located in Buthidaung.

The Sai Din Waterfall, which is the largest and highest waterfall in Rakhine state, is located in the Buthidaung township.

== Demographics ==
As of 2024, the township has an estimated population of 206,000 people. The majority of the population are ethnically Rohingyas, comprising approximately 70% of the residents, while 25% are Rakhines and the rest are other groups such as Bengali Hindus, Chins, Kameins, and Khumis.

== Education ==
In 2010–11, there were three high schools, one high school, three middle schools, three middle schools (branches), 20 post-primary schools, and 122 primary schools.

== Notable people ==
- Nay San Lwin, activist and political commentator
- Wai Wai Nu, human rights activist
- Shwe Abdul Razak, human rights activist
- Maung Nur Ahmed, health worker
- Kyaw Min Anwarul Huq, former politician and elected to the Parliament of Myanmar.
- M. A. Gaffar, politician
- B.A. Jafor Habib, President of Rohingya Patriotic Force
- Habi Uzzama, Father of B.A. Jafor Habib
- Ro Ra Jis Khan, a Rohingya dental student & human right activist
