= Maungdaw Township =

Maungdaw Township မောင်တောမြို့နယ်
- Township
- Location in Maungdaw district (in red)
- Coordinates: 20°49′N 92°22′E
- Country: Myanmar
- State: Rakhine State
- District: Maungdaw District

Population (2012)
  - Ethnicities: 80% Rohingya 20% Others: Rakhine; Bamar; Daingnet; Hindu; Kaman; Maramagyi; Mro; Thet
  - Religions: Buddhism Islam Christianity Hinduism
- Time zone: UTC+6:30 (MMT)

Maungdaw Township (Burmese: မောင်တောမြို့နယ် [máʊɰ̃dɔ́ mjo̰nɛ̀]) is a township of Maungdaw District in Rakhine State, Myanmar (Burma). The principal town is Maungdaw.

== Demographics ==
The township has a large Muslim Rohingya population, roughly 80% of the total population in 2012. In July 2012, the government of Myanmar did not include Rohingyas, and instead classified as stateless Bengali Muslims from Bangladesh, on the government's list of more than 135 ethnic groups. Other 20% population are Rakhine, Bamar, Kamein, Khami, Daingnet, Mro, Meitei, and Thet.

== Education ==
There are five basic education high schools, three high schools (branches), eight middle schools, one middle school (branch), one affiliated middle school, 16 post-primary schools and 125 primary schools as of 2011.

== History ==
The area comprising the township served as natural water boundary between historic Bengal and Arakan, often Arakanese kingdoms often spreading their sovereignty over Bengal crossing Naf River.

Coastal areas of Maungdaw was site of battle between Portuguese mercenaries and Arakanese forces during the reign of King Min Khamaung around 1615, allied with the Dutch VOC.

Following Burmese annexation of Arakan in 1785, subsequent Arakanese rebellions between 1790s and 1811 led to mass exodus of refugees fleeing to British controlled East India Company whom most of them resided at Cox's Bazar. Notably an incident occurred in Northern area of township led to breakout of the First Anglo-Burmese War.

On 6 February 2024, the Arakan Army captured the towns of Taung Pyo Letwe and Taung Pyo Letyar from the military junta during Myanmar's civil war, with nearly 60 regime troops escaping over the border of the Bandarban district of Bangladesh. In December 2024, Arakan Army during the Battle of Maungdaw further captured the entire Maungdaw securing full control over the 271-kilometer border with Bangladesh.

== List of towns ==
- Taung Pyo Letwe (တောင်ပြိုလက်ဝဲမြို့)
- Taung Pyo Letyar (တောင်ပြိုလက်ယာ)
- Myinhlutt (မြင်းလွှတ်)
- Nyaungyaung (ညောင်ချောင်း)
