= List of Rohingya people =

Below is a list of notable Rohingya people:

== Activism and cause célèbres ==
- Mohib Ullah
- Nay San Lwin
- Wai Wai Nu
- Jaivet Ealom
- Nurul Amin Shah Alam

== Entertainment and sports ==
- Jasmin Akter

== Law ==
- Nurul Islam
- Razia Sultana
- Kyaw Hla Aung

== Military ==
- Abu Dhar Azzam
- Ataullah abu Ammar Jununi, leader of the Arakan Rohingya Salvation Army

== Politics ==
- Abul Khair, MP
- Fazal Ahmed, MP
- Gani Markan
- M. A. Gaffar, MP
- Nur Ahmed
- Sultan Ahmed
- Sultan Mahmud, MP and Union minister
- Aye Nyunt, first woman MP from Arakan
- Chit Lwin Ebrahim
- Aung Zaw Win
- Aung Kyaw Moe (politician)
- Shamsul Anwarul Huq

== Religion ==
- Muhammad Ayyub
- Mohammad Hanif, creator of the Hanifi Rohingya script

== Science ==
- Anita Schug
