= Gani Markan =

Burmese politician

Member of the Legislative Council of Burma from Maungdaw-Buthidaung
- In office 1936–1948

Gani Markan was one of the first elected Arakanese Indian legislators in British Burma. He was elected to the Legislative Council of Burma during the 1936 Burmese general election from the Maungdaw-Buthidaung constituency in Arakan Division.

The legislative council members were divided between the categories of Burmese national, Kayin, Anglo-Burman, Indian, Chinese and European seats. Markan, despite being of Indian origin, was elected in the Burmese national category. This was because Arakanese Indians claimed to be a native community, whereas other Indians were immigrants.

== See also ==
- Rohingya people
