= Nur Ahmed =

Nur Ahmed may refer to:

- Nur Ahmed (politician, born 1890)
- Nur Ahmed (politician, born 1928)
- Nur Ahmadjan Bughra, Uyghur emir
