= Aung Zaw Win =

Rohingya activist and politician

Aung Zaw Win is a Rohingya rights activist, businessman, and politician who served as a member of parliament in Myanmar's House of Representatives.

== Career ==
Win was a businessman and member of the Union Solidarity and Development Party. He served as a member of parliament for Maungdaw in Rakhine State.

Win was arrested at Yangon International Airport while he was on his way to Bangkok on 28 February 2018. He was charged with providing financial support to the Arakan Rohingya Salvation Army. His charges were met with skepticism by Rohingya activists due to Win's close relationship with the military establishment prior to his arrest.
