= Democracy and Human Rights Party =

Democracy and Human Rights Party ဒီမိုကရေစီနှင့် လူ့အခွင့်အရေးပါတီ
- Chairman: Kyaw Min
- Secretary-General: Kyaw Soe Aung
- Founded: 1989 (founded); 12 March 2013 (re-registered)
- Headquarters: Botahtaung Township, Yangon Region
- Ideology: Rohingya rights
- Colours: Blue, green, red
- Seats in the Amyotha Hluttaw: 0 / 224
- Seats in the Pyithu Hluttaw: 0 / 440

Party flag

The Democracy and Human Rights Party (Burmese: ဒီမိုကရေစီနှင့် လူ့အခွင့်အရေးပါတီ; abbr. DHRP) is a political party in Myanmar representing the Rohingya of northern Rakhine State.

== History ==
Flag of the National Democratic Party for Human Rights

Established in 1989, among others by the lawyer and human rights activist Kyaw Hla Aung, the party was originally known as the National Democratic Party for Human Rights and contested eight seats in the 1990 general elections. It received 1% of the vote, winning four seats. Its MPs included Nur Ahmed, Chit Lwin Ebrahim, Fazal Ahmed and Shamsul Anwarul Huq.

After being banned by the military government, it continued to operate in exile, and the National Democratic Party for Human Rights (exile) was formed in New York City in 2003. The party registered as the Democracy and Human Rights Party to contest in the 2015 general election, but only three of its eighteen candidates were allowed to stand, none of whom were Rohingyas.
