= Razia Sultana (lawyer) =

Bangladeshi lawyer

- রাজিয়া সুলতানা
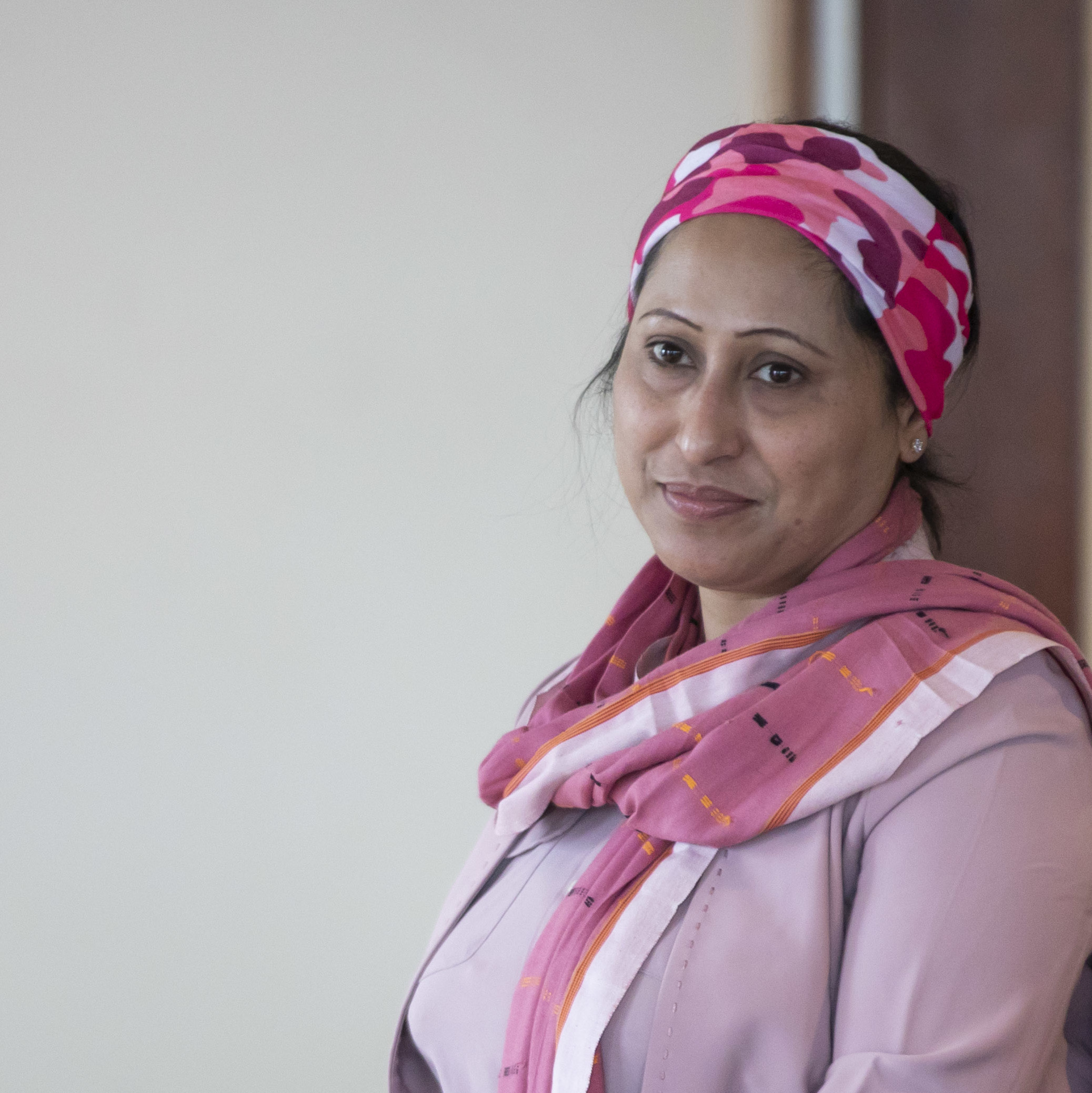
- Born: 1973 (age 52–53); Maungdaw, Rakhine, Myanmar
- Occupations: Lawyer, educator, human rights activist

Razia Sultana (Bengali: রাজিয়া সুলতানা; born 1973) is a Bangladeshi lawyer who was born in Myanmar and has won the International Women of Courage Award 2019.

== Biography ==
Razia Sultana was born in 1973 in Maungdaw, to a Rohingya family. She grew up in Bangladesh.

She is working for the Rohingya people as well as other ethnic people of Myanmar. She is a lawyer, educator and human rights activist with a focus on supporting Rohingya girls and women.

She has published two reports after conducting interviews with hundreds of Rohingya people, titled Witness to Horror and Rape by Command. In these reports she has shared with the world about sexual violence against Rohingya girls and women by Burmese security forces. She has also contributed to The Killing Fields of Alethankyaw, which was published by Kaladan Press.

Razia Sultana is working as a coordinator for the Free Rohingya Coalition (FRC) and as a director of the Arakan Rohingya National Organization's (ARNO) women's section.

== Publications ==
- Witness to Horror
- Rape by Command
- The Killing Fields of Alethankyaw (Contributor)
