= Kyaw Hla Aung =

Burmese lawyer (1940–2021)

U Kyaw Hla Aung
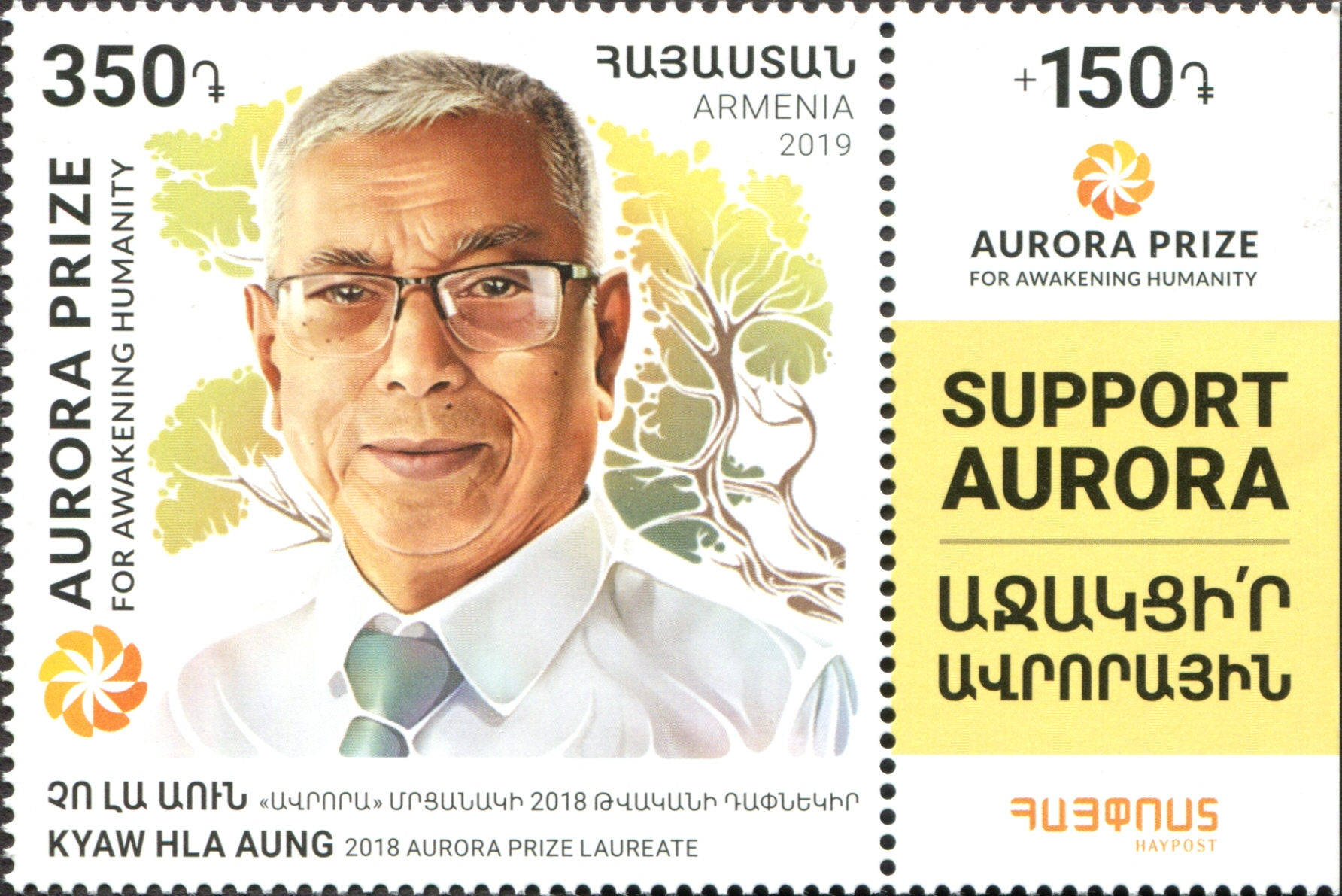
- Born: 16 August 1940; Akyab, Burma
- Died: 31 July 2021 (aged 80); Botahtaung, Yangon, Myanmar
- Education: Higher Grade Pleader/Lawyer exam passed
- Occupations: Former Stenographer, former Clerk, former Lawyer (Rakhine State high court) and former administrator at MSF-Holland (Sittway office)
- Political party: National Democratic Party for Human Rights
- Parents: U Yusuf (father); Daw Gul Badan (mother)
- Awards: Aurora Prize for Awakening Humanity (2018)

U Kyaw Hla Aung (16 August 1940 – 31 July 2021) was a Burmese lawyer and civil rights activist and member of the Rohingya community.

== Early life ==
Kyaw Hla Aung was born in Sittwe, capital of Rakhine State, Burma, British Raj, as the son of a government official. His father Yusuf was a state court's Head Clerk, served for 40 years. His birth name was Muhammad Kasim. He grew up and obtained his education in Sittwe and began to work as a court clerk and stenographer in 1960. Motivated by the injustice he saw, he quit his job and started to train as a lawyer, graduating in 1982.

== Activism ==
In 1986, as the government of Myanmar began to confiscate the land of the Rohingya, Aung represented a group of Rohingya farmers, writing an appeal letter. In retaliation, he was detained and spent two years in prison in Rangoon. In the aftermath of the 1988 protests he could leave prison and returned to Sittwe. He co-founded the "National Democratic Party for Human Rights" and was selected as candidate for the elections in 1990. To prevent his candidacy, he was arrested again and sentenced to 14 years in prison. In 1997 he was released in the course of an amnesty, but was repeatedly arrested afterwards. His home was razed in the course of the Rohingya conflict and since 2018 he lived in the Thet Kae Pyin internment camp outside of Sittwe, where he was one of the camp leaders.

The main goal of his activism has been to organize access to healthcare and education for the Rohingya community and raise the awareness about the conflict.

In 2018, Aung won the Aurora Prize for Awakening Humanity.

In 2019, he was listed in the Fortune magazine's list of "World's Greatest Leaders on rank 28". The Armenian post office dedicated a stamp to him in 2019.

Aung was married and had seven children.

Aung died in Botahtaung, Yangon, where he had moved from the refugee camp for health treatment.
