= Shwe Maung =

Burmese politician (born 1965)

Shwe Maung MP
- ရွှေမောင်

Member of the Pyithu Hluttaw
- In office 31 January 2011 – 29 January 2016
- Preceded by: Position established
- Succeeded by: Aung Thaung Shwe
- Constituency: Buthidaung Township

Personal details
- Born: 30 June 1965 (age 60) Buthidaung, Arakan, Burma
- Party: Independent
- Other political affiliations: Union Solidarity and Development Party (2009–2015)
- Spouse: Tin Tin Win
- Children: Shwe Yi Win; Min Shwe Maung Htet; Min Sithu Maung
- Parent(s): Abdul Hardi (father); Aye Sein (mother)
- Occupation: Human rights activist, politician

Shwe Maung (Burmese: ရွှေမောင်; born 30 June 1965), also known by his Islamic name Abdul Razak, is a Rohingya rights activist in Myanmar. He served as a member of parliament in the House of Representatives for Buthidaung constituency from 2011 to 2016.

== Early life ==
Shwe Maung was born in Buthidaung, Rakhine State, to Rohingya Muslim parents, Abdul Hadi and Aye Sein. Although his parents are Myanmar citizens, the Union Election Commission of Myanmar ruled that they were not in order to bar U Shwe Maung from the 2015 General Election.

== Political career ==
U Shwe Maung is a former member of the Union Solidarity and Development Party. He served political development since 2010, Rohingya rights and prospects for reconciliation in Rakhine State.

In the 2010 Myanmar general election, he contested the Buthidaung Township constituency and won a House of Representatives seat. He was the only Rohingya member in Myanmar's parliament.

During his time in parliament, he was a member of the Reform and Modernization Assessment Committee. The parliament barred him from contesting the 2015 Myanmar general election, claiming he was ineligible to run due to supposed issues of citizenship.

Shwe Maung serves as a board member of the ASEAN Parliamentarians for Human Rights (APHR) and founding member of the International Panel of Parliamentarians for Freedom of Religion or Belief (IPPFoRB) and as President of the Arakan Institute for Peace and Human Rights (AiPAH, formerly the Arakan Institute for Peace and Development, AiPAD).

On 8 September 2017, a police captain of Buthidaung Police Station opened a case against Shwe Maung under the Counter-Terrorism Law for allegedly supporting the Arakan Rohingya Salvation Army (ARSA) and defending them on his Facebook page. U Shwe Maung requested State Counsellor Aung San Suu Kyi and Myanmar Military Chief Senior General Min Aung Hlaing via Facebook to protect innocent Rohingya in his constituency from Myanmar Security Forces.
