= Buthidaung =

Buthidaung ဘူးသီးတောင်မြို့
- Town
- Location in Myanmar (Burma)
- Coordinates: 20°52′N 92°32′E
- Country: Myanmar
- State: Rakhine State
- District: Maungdaw District
- Township: Buthidaung Township

Population (2021)
  - Total: 55,545
- Time zone: UTC+6:30 (MMT)
- Area codes: 42, 43

Buthidaung (Burmese: ဘူးသီးတောင်မြို့, MLCTS: bu:si:taung mrui., pronounced [búðídàʊɰ̃ mjo̰]) is a town in Rakhine State, in the westernmost part of Myanmar (Burma). It is the administrative seat of the Buthidaung Township. Buthidaung lies on the west bank of the Mayu river, and experienced severe flooding in June 2010 and July 2011. Buthidaung is 16 miles east from Maungdaw. The two towns are connected by two tunnels through the Mayu mountains that were built in 1918.

== Geography ==
Buthidaung is one of the 16 towns in Rakhine State. Buthidaung is situated about 16 miles from Maungdaw, and similarly to this town has no train station or airport.

== History ==
Buthidaung was the birthplace of King Min Razagyi.

Buthidaung has a majority Rohingya population, of which many have fled since the 2012 Rakhine State riots. Buthidaung has the second largest population of Rohingya after Maungdaw.

During the 2016–17 Northern Rakhine State clashes, three police stations in Buthidaung were reportedly surrounded by Rohingya insurgents. As a result of the clashes in Buthidaung and much of the surrounding area, many Rohingyas have left their homes.

On 18 May 2024, the town was captured by the Arakan Army during its Rakhine State offensive.

== Notable people ==
- Nay San Lwin, activist and political commentator
- Wai Wai Nu, human rights activist
- Shwe Abdul Razak, human rights activist
- Maung Nur Ahmed, health worker
- Kyaw Min Anwarul Huq, former politician and elected to the Parliament of Myanmar.
- M. A. Gaffar, politician
- B.A. Jafor Habib, President of Rohingya Patriotic Force
- Habi Uzzama, Father of B.A. Jafor Habib
- Ro Ra Jis Khan, a Rohingya dental student & human right activist
