= Fazal Ahmed =

Burmese politician

Member-elect of the Parliament of Myanmar from Maungdaw-2
- Preceded by: Constituency established
- Succeeded by: Constituency abolished

Personal details
- Born: 1941 (age 84–85) Basuba Village, Maungdaw, Arakan Division, British Burma (now in Myanmar)
- Party: National Democratic Party for Human Rights
- Parent: U Muhammed Kalu
- Education: Lawyer

Fazal Ahmed (born 1941) is a Rohingya lawyer and former politician in Myanmar. He was a leader of the National Democratic Party for Human Rights (NDPHR). He was elected as Parliament of Myanmar MP during the 1990 Burmese general election.

== Early life ==
Ahmed was born in 1941 in the village of Basuba in Maungdaw Arakan Division, which was part of British Burma, at the time. His father's name was Mohammed Kalu. Ahmed attended the State High School of Maungdaw. After completing his high school education, he joined the Deputy Commissioner's Office in Maungdaw as a clerk in 1960. Over the years, he served in various offices in Maungdaw, Buthidaung, Kyauk Taw, Kaukpyu, Taungup, and Sittwe in Arakan State. Subsequently, Ahmed passed the higher-grade pleader (HGP) examination and began working as a private lawyer. He also had a stint working in the office of the Deputy Commissioner in Maungdaw.

== Political career ==
Ahmed was a member of the Central Executive Committee of the National Democratic Party for Human Rights [NDPHR]. Ahmed contested the 1990 general election from Maungdaw-2 constituency. He won the election with a mandate of 24,833 votes out of 58,230 votes. He was one of the four NDPHR MPs in the Burmese parliament.

== Detention ==
The Burmese military junta banned NDPHR in 1992. Ahmed was arrested and tortured. He was sentenced for five years.

== See also ==
- Rohingya people
