= Shamsul Anwarul Huq =

Burmese academic and activist (born 1944)

Member-elect of the Parliament of Myanmar from Buthidaung-1
- Preceded by: Constituency established
- Succeeded by: Constituency abolished

Personal details
- Born: 19 March 1944 (age 82) Buthidaung, Arakan Division, British Burma (now in Myanmar)
- Party: National Democratic Party for Human Rights
- Spouse: Daw Tezi
- Children: Khin Khin Nu, Wai Wai Nu, Maung Aung Naing
- Parent(s): Hajji Fazolur Rahaman and Sounn Khatun
- Relatives: Phir Moulana Muzaffor Ahmad
- Education: Rangoon Institute of Economics

Shamsul Anwarul Huq (born 1944), also known as Kyaw Min, is a Rohingya academic, pro-democracy activist and former politician in Myanmar. He has also been a political prisoner. Shamsul Anwar was a CEC member of the National Democratic Party for Human Rights. Shamsul Anwar was elected to the Parliament of Myanmar in 1990.

== Early life and profession ==
Shamsul Anwar was born in 1944 in the village of Mikyanzay (Minggisi) in Buthidaung of Arakan Division, British Burma. His father was Fazlur Rahman. He graduated from the Rangoon Institute of Economics with a bachelor's degree in economics. He also obtained a diploma in educational practice from the Institute of Education in Rangoon. He joined the Education Department of Burma in 1969. He taught in various state-owned primary schools in Arakan until 1985. He became a primary school headmaster. In 1988, he was dismissed from his job due to his involvement in the 8888 uprising.

== Political career ==
Shamsul Anwar was a member of the Central Executive Committee of the National Democratic Party for Human Rights. He was elected from Buthidaung-1 constituency during the 1990 Burmese general election, after receiving 30,990 out of 41,668 votes. His party won a total of four seats. The Burmese military junta banned his party in 1992. At the invitation of Aung San Suu Kyi, Shamsul Anwar joined the Committee Representing the People's Parliament in 1998.

== Detentions ==
In 1992, Shamsul Anwar was detained by Burmese military intelligence for three months during operations against the Rohingya population. In 1994, military intelligence detained him for 45 days. In March 2005, he was arrested from his home in Rangoon, and was charged under Section 18 of the 1982 Burmese nationality law and Section 5 of the Anti-State Emergency Law. He was sentenced to 47 years in imprisonment. His wife, two daughters and one son were also arrested under the 1982 Burmese nationality law, and sentenced to 17 years in prison. The convictions barred the family from contesting elections.

== See also ==
- Rohingya people
