= Chit Lwin Ebrahim =

Mayanma politician (born 1948)

Member-elect of the Parliament of Myanmar from Maungdaw-1
- Preceded by: Constituency established
- Succeeded by: Constituency abolished

Personal details
- Born: 1946 (age 79–80) Maungdaw, Arakan Division, British Burma (now in Myanmar)
- Party: National Democratic Party for Human Rights
- Education: Rangoon Institute of Economics

Ebrahim, also known as Chit Lwin, is a Rohingya lawyer, accountant and former politician. He was elected as a Parliament of Myanmar MP in 1990 election. He was the chairman of the National Democratic Party for Human Rights. The party was later banned by the Burmese military junta and its members are barred from contesting elections.

== Early life and profession ==
Ebrahim was born in 1946 in Myuthugyi village of Maungdaw. His father was Master Siddique Ahmed. He attended the State High School in Maungdaw. He graduated from the Rangoon Institute of Economics with a Bachelor of Commerce in 1967. He received a post-graduate diploma in economic planning from the Institute of Economics in Rangoon. He later studied accountancy and law, becoming a certified accountant and auditor. He joined the Ministry of Finance in 1967 and worked there till 1983. Since 1984, he has been a lawyer in the High Court of Rangoon.

== Political career ==
During the 1990 Burmese general election, Ebrahim contested from the Maungdaw-1 constituency and won the election with 20,045 votes out of 64,019 votes. His party won four seats in the Burmese parliament.
