= Maungdaw =

Maungdaw မောင်တောမြို့
- Town
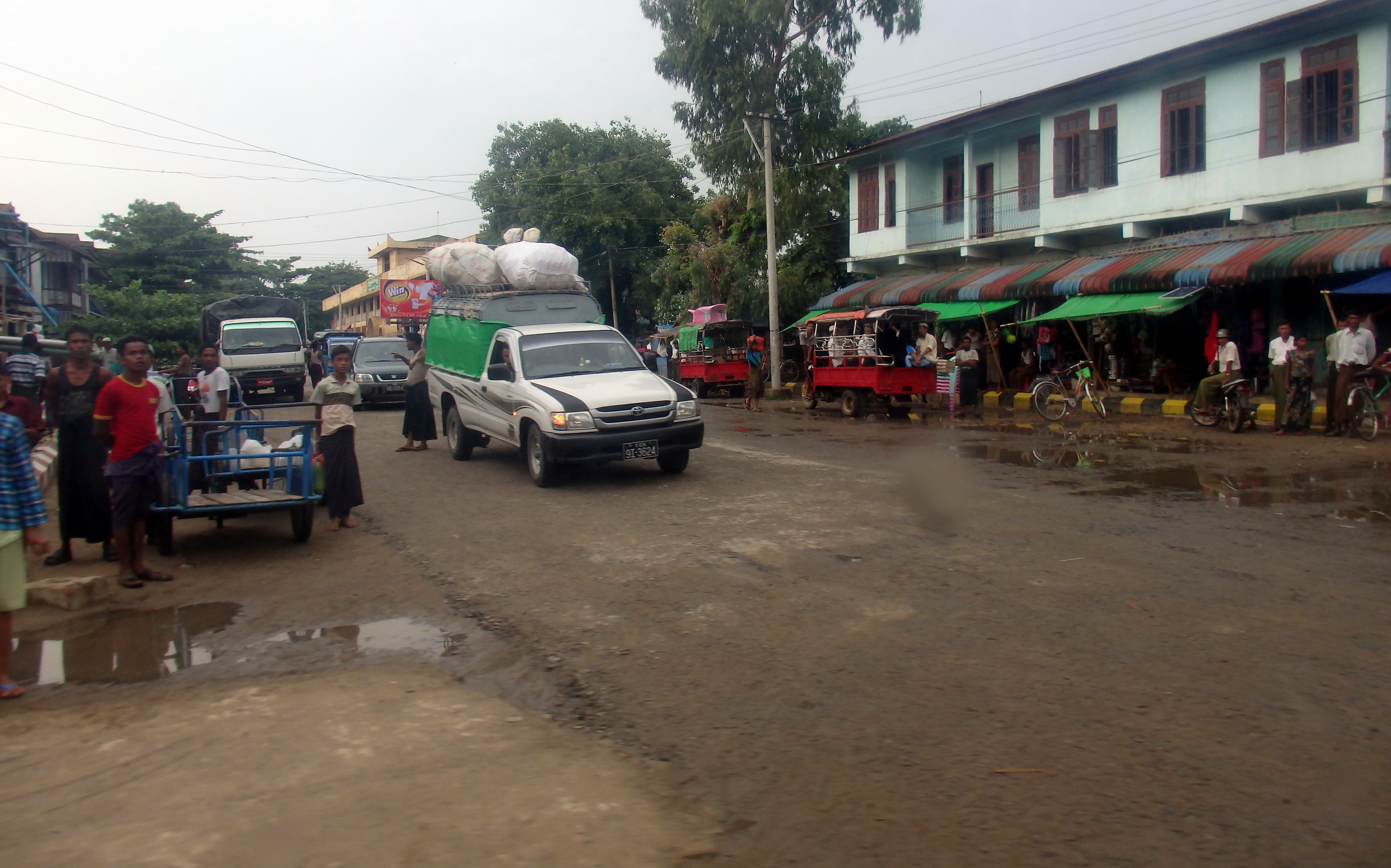
- A street in Maungdaw

- Location in Myanmar (Burma)
- Coordinates: 20°49′N 92°22′E
- Country: Myanmar
- Division: Rakhine State
- District: Maungdaw District
- Township: Maungdaw Township
- Control: Arakan Army

Area
  - Total: 582.92 sq mi (1,509.8 km^{2})
- Elevation: 10 ft (3.0 m)

Population (2008)
  - Ethnicities: 80% Rohingya 20% Others: Rakhine; Bamar; Daingnet; Hindu; Kaman; Maramagyi; Mro; Thet
  - Religions: Buddhism Islam Christianity Hinduism
- Time zone: UTC+6:30 (MMT)
- Climate: Am

Maungdaw (Burmese: မောင်တောမြို့, MLCTS: maung:tau mrui., pronounced [máʊɰ̃dɔ́ mjo̰]) is a town in Rakhine State, in the western part of Myanmar (Burma). It is the administrative seat of Maungdaw Township and Maungdaw District. Bordering Bangladesh, Maungdaw is home to one of 2 official border trade posts with Bangladesh. This post is called Maungdaw Port.

Maungdaw is 16 miles (26 km) west of Buthidaung. The two towns are separated by the Mayu Mountains and are connected by two tunnels built in 1918. The district around Maungdaw is home to a large Rohingya population.

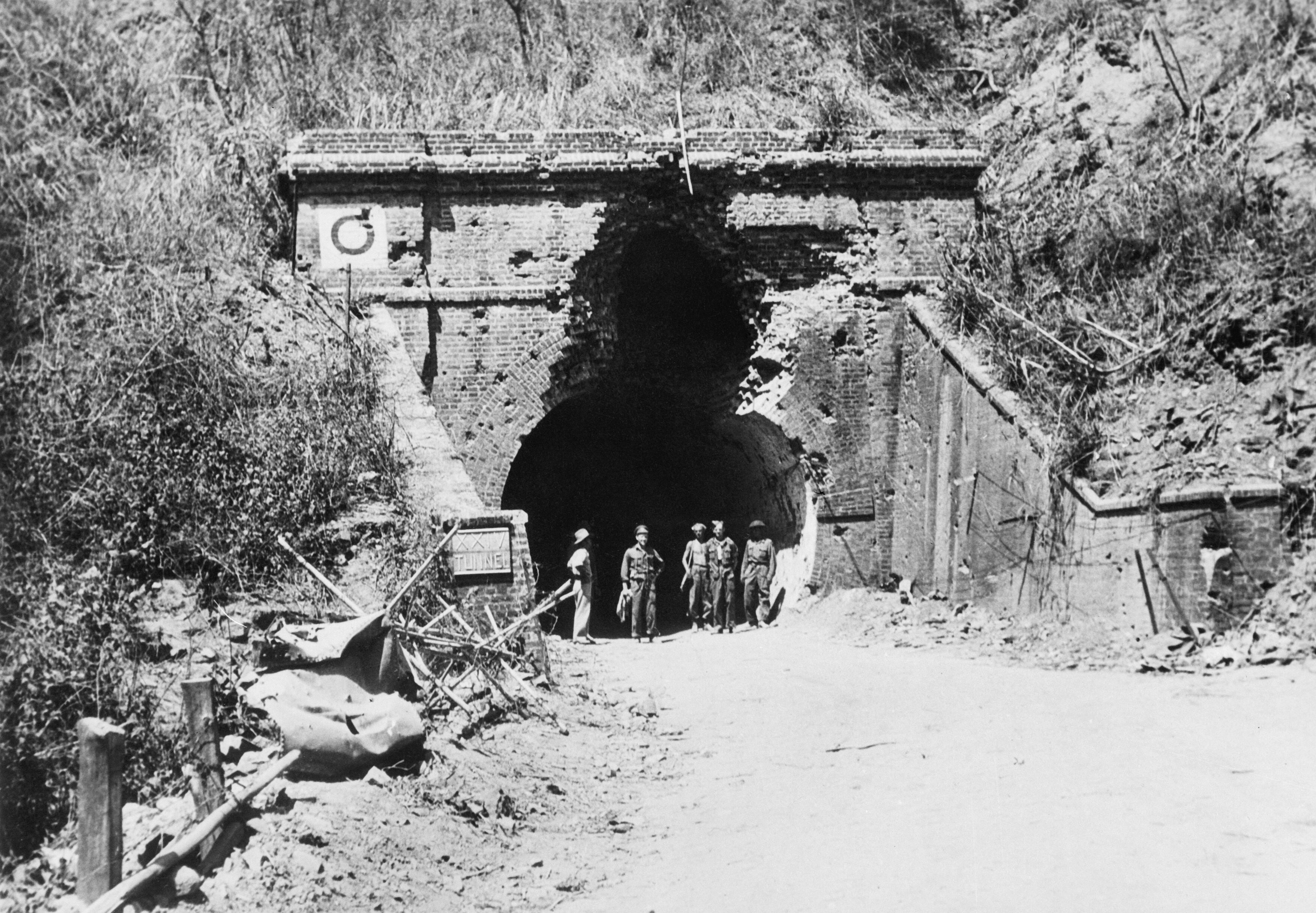
British troops stand at the entrance to the Maungdaw-Buthidaung road captured by the Allied 15th Corps in January 1944.

== History ==
In January 1825, following Burmese retreats from (Cox's Bazaar) crossed the Naaf River to their main post in Maungdaw. The British forces divided into two division: the first, under General Joseph Wanton Morrison advanced into Maungdaw creek and stormed enemy stockades and whilst forces under General McBean proceeded along the coastlines of Maungdaw to pursuit the Burmese army, royal navy and army fully occupied the town as enemy fleeing eastward along the Mayu mountains as royal navy continued their operation commanded under Commodore Hayes who left on 16th of February. At Maungdaw, General Morrison garrison possessed large quantities of grains and huge stockades left by U Sa forces under Burmese.

In August 2024, the civilians trying to flee the town from violence related to the Myanmar civil war were attacked in an artillery and drone attack. The victims were predominantly Rohingya, trying to flee fierce fighting in Maungdaw by crossing the Naf River into Bangladesh. The number killed by the strike may have been between 150 or 200, with possibly 300 more injured. A number of local Rohingya activists blamed the Arakan Army for the strike, which the group denied, and blamed the government for.

On 8 December 2024, the Arakan Army took complete control of Maungdaw and the Bangladesh–Myanmar border after a prolonged 6 months battle in Maungdaw.

== Demographics ==
The majority of the populace, about 80%, are Rohingya people, while the remainder of the populace consists of other ethnic groups, including Rakhine, Bamar, Daingnet, and Mro.

== Education ==
As of 2016, there are et high schools, 10 middle schools, 16 post-primary schools and 125 primary schools.

== Economy ==
The official border trade post with Bangladeshi town of Teknaf opened on 5 September 1995. In 2022, total trade volume at the border post stood at US$15.519 million.

== Notable places ==
- Maungdaw Myoma Mosque

== Notable people ==
- Mohib Ullah, peace activist
- Nurul Islam, political activist
- Sultan Ahmed, former politician
- Abul Khair, legislator
- Chit Lwin Ebrahim, lawyer and former politician
- Fazal Ahmed, lawyer and former politician
- Razia Sultana, educator
- Maung Maung Win, footballer
