= Nur Ahmed (politician, born 1928) =

Burmese politician (born 1928)

Member-elect of the Parliament of Myanmar from Buthidaung-2
- Preceded by: Constituency established
- Succeeded by: Constituency abolished

Personal details
- Born: 1928 Buthidaung, Arakan Division, British Burma (now in Myanmar)
- Party: National Democratic Party for Human Rights

Nur Ahmed (born 1928), also known as Tin Maung, was a Burmese Rohingya legislator, health worker and activist. He was a CEC member of the National Democratic Party for Human Rights. He was elected to the Parliament of Myanmar in 1990.

== Early life ==
Ahmed was born in 1928 in the village of Phone Nyo Lake in Buthidaung. He attended the Buthidaung State High School. He completed his vocational training at the Health Assistance Training Course in Insein, Rangoon between 1954 and 1956. He later joined the Anti-Malaria Department of the Burmese government. He was a Health Assistant till 1968. Ahmed was a member of the Rohingya Independent Force until 1978.

== Political career ==
As CEC member of the NDPHR, Ahmed contested the 1990 Burmese general election and won from Buthidaung-2 constituency with 20,045 votes out of 40,143 votes. The NDPHR won four seats in parliament. In 1992, the Burmese military junta banned the NDPHR.
