= Persecution of Muslims in Myanmar =

Religion in Myanmar (2014 Myanmar Census)
1. Buddhism (90.0%)
2. Christianity (6.30%)
3. Islam (2.10%)
4. Hinduism (0.50%)
5. Tribal religions (0.80%)
6. Other (0.20%)
7. No religion (0.10%)

There is a history of persecution of Muslims in Myanmar that continues to the present day. Myanmar is a Buddhist majority country, with significant Christian and Muslim minorities. While Muslims served in the government of Prime Minister U Nu (1948–1963), the situation changed with the 1962 Burmese coup d'état. While a few continued to serve, most Christians and Muslims were excluded from positions in the government and army. In 1982, the government introduced regulations that denied citizenship to anyone who could not prove Burmese ancestry from before 1823. This disenfranchised many Christians and Muslims in Myanmar, even though they had lived in Myanmar for several generations.

The Rohingya people are a large Muslim group in Myanmar; the Rohingyas have been among the most persecuted group under Myanmar's military regime, with the Kachin, who are predominantly U.S. Baptists, a close second. The United Nations states that the Rohingyas are one of the most persecuted groups in the world. Since 1948, successive governments have carried out 13 military operations against the Rohingya (including in 1975, 1978, 1989, 1991–92, 2002). During the operations, Myanmar security forces have driven the Rohingyas off their land, burned down their mosques and committed widespread looting, arson and rape of Rohingya Muslims. Outside of these military raids, Rohingya are subjected to frequent theft and extortion from the authorities and many are subjected to forced labor. In some cases, land occupied by Rohingya Muslims has been confiscated and reallocated to local Buddhists.

== History ==
Muslims have lived in Myanmar since the 11th century AD. The first Muslim documented in Burmese history (recorded in Hmannan Yazawin or Glass Palace Chronicle) was Byat Wi during the reign of a Thaton king, circa 1050 AD. The two sons of Byat Wi's brother Byat Ta, Shwe Hpyin Naungdaw and Shwe Hpyin Nyidaw, were executed as children either because of their Islamic faith, or because they refused forced labour. In the Glass Palace Chronicle, they were recorded to have served King Anawrahta as special agents and were later executed for a misunderstanding regarding missing bricks for a stupa. They were later deified into nats. During a time of war, King Kyansittha sent a hunter as a sniper to assassinate Nga Yaman Kan and Rahman Khan.

=== Pre-modern persecution ===
The Burmese king Bayinnaung (1550–1581 AD) imposed restrictions upon his Muslim subjects, but not actual persecution. In 1559 AD, after conquering Pegu (present-day Bago), Bayinnaung banned Islamic ritual slaughter, thereby prohibiting Muslims from consuming halal meals of goats and chicken. He also banned Eid al-Adha and Qurbani, regarding killing animals in the name of religion as a cruel custom.

In the 17th century, Indian Muslims residing in Arakan were massacred. These Muslims had settled with Shah Shuja, who had fled India after losing the Mughal war of succession. Initially, the Arakan pirate Sandathudama (1652–1687 AD), who was the local pirate of Chittagong and Arakan, allowed Shuja and his followers to settle there. But a dispute arose between Sandatudama and Shuja, and Shuja unsuccessfully attempted to rebel. Sandathudama killed most of Shuja's followers, though Shuja himself escaped the massacre.

King Alaungpaya (1752–1760) prohibited Muslims from practicing the Islamic method of slaughtering cattle.

King Bodawpaya (1782–1819) arrested four prominent Burmese Muslim Imams from Myedu and killed them in Ava, the capital, after they refused to eat pork. According to the Myedu Muslim and Burma Muslim version, Bodawpaya later apologised for the killings and recognised the Imams as saints.

=== British rule ===
In 1921, the population of Muslims in Burma was around 500,000. During British rule, Burmese Muslims were seen as "Indian", as the majority of Indians living in Burma were Muslims, even though the Burmese Muslims were different from Indian Muslims. Thus, Burmese Muslims, Indian Muslims and Indian Hindus were collectively known as "kala" (black or dark-skinned).

After World War I, there was an upsurge in anti-Indian sentiments. There were several causes of anti-Indian and anti-Muslim sentiments in Burma. In India, many Buddhists had been persecuted by the Mughal Empire. There was significant job competition between Indian migrants, who were willing to do unpleasant jobs for low income, and the native Burmese. The Great Depression intensified this competition, aggravating anti-Indian sentiment.

On 22 May 1930, anti-Indian riots were sparked by a labor issue at the Yangon port. After Indian workers at the port went on strike, the British firm Stevedores tried to break the strike by hiring Burmese workers. The Stevedores and Indian workers reached a settlement on May 26 the Indians returned to work. Stevedores then laid off the recently hired Burmese workers. The Burmese workers blamed Indian workers for their loss of jobs, and a riot broke out. At the port, at least 200 Indian workers were massacred and dumped into the river. Another 2,000 were injured. Authorities fired upon armed rioters who refused to lay down their weapons under Section 144 of the Criminal Procedure Code. The riots rapidly spread throughout Burma, targeting Indians and Muslims.

In 1938, anti-Muslim riots again broke out in Burma. Moshe Yegar writes that the riots were fanned by anti-British and nationalistic sentiments, but were disguised as anti-Muslim so as not to provoke a response by the British. Nevertheless, the British government responded to the riots and demonstrations. The agitation against Muslims and the British was led by Burmese newspapers.

Another riot started after a marketplace scuffle between Indians and Burmese. During the "Burma for Burmese" campaign, a violent demonstration took place in Surti Bazaar, a Muslim area. When the police, who were ethnically Indian, tried to break up the demonstration, three monks were injured. Images of monks being injured by ethnically Indian policemen were circulated by Burmese newspapers, provoking riots. Muslim properties, including shops and houses were looted. According to official sources, 204 Muslims were killed and over 1,000 were injured. 113 mosques were damaged.

On 22 September 1938, the British Governor set up the Inquiry Committee to investigate the riots. It was determined that the discontent was caused by the deterioration in the sociopolitical and economic condition of the Burmese. This report itself was used to incite sectarianism by Burmese newspapers.

=== Japanese rule ===
Panglong, a Chinese Muslim town in British Burma, was entirely destroyed by the Japanese invaders in the Japanese invasion of Burma. The Hui Muslim Ma Guanggui became the leader of the Hui Panglong self defense guard created by Su who was sent by the Kuomintang government of the Republic of China to fight against the Japanese invasion of Panglong in 1942. Panglong was razed by the Japanese, forcing out over 200 Hui households and causing an influx of Hui refugees into Yunnan and Kokang. One of Ma Guanggui's nephews was Ma Yeye, a son of Ma Guanghua, and he narrated the history of Panglong which included the Japanese attack. An account of the Japanese attack on the Hui in Panglong was written and published in 1998 by a Hui from Panglong called "Panglong Booklet". The Japanese attack in Burma caused the Hui Mu family to seek refuge in Panglong but they were driven out again to Yunnan from Panglong when the Japanese attacked Panglong.

During World War II, the Japanese passed easily through the areas under Rohingyas. The Japanese defeated the Rohingyas, and 40,000 Rohingyas eventually fled to Chittagong after repeated massacres by the Burmese and Japanese forces.

=== Muslims under General Ne Win ===
The issue of Indian migration to Burma during British rule was a significant issue around the time of independence. Ultimately, Indian Muslims were denied citizenship, being seen as foreigners. Divisions grew internally as many Indian Muslims, especially in Upper Burma, attempted to assimilate into Burmese culture wanting to be "Burmese in public and Muslims in their homes". Despite these divisions and the prominence of unrelated Muslim minorities, the Burmese Buddhist majority increasing saw all Muslims as foreigners who needed to be dealt with to end the country's civil war in the 1960s.

After the coup d'état of General Ne Win in 1962, Muslims were expelled from the army and were rapidly marginalised. The generic ethnic slur of "Kalar" used against perceived "dark-skinned foreigners" gained especially negative connotations when referring to Burmese Muslims during this time. Accusations of "terrorism" were made against Muslim organisations such as the All Burma Muslim Union, causing Muslims to join armed resistance groups to fight for greater freedoms. Ne Win targeted Burmese Indian and nationalised their businesses, causing mass emigration.

=== 1997 Mandalay riots ===
Tension grew between Buddhists and Muslims during the renovation of a Buddha statue. The bronze Buddha statue in the Maha Muni pagoda, originally from the Arakan, brought to Mandalay by King Bodawpaya in 1784 was renovated by the authorities. The Mahamyat Muni statue was broken open, leaving a gaping hole in the statue, and it was generally presumed that the regime was searching for the Padamya Myetshin, a legendary ruby that ensures victory in war to those who possess it.

On 16 March 1997, in Mandalay, a mob of 1,000–1,500 Buddhist monks and others shouted anti-Muslim slogans as they targeted mosques, shop-houses, and vehicles that were in the vicinity of mosques for destruction. Looting, the burning of religious books, acts of sacrilege, and vandalizing Muslim-owned establishments were also common. At least three people were killed and around 100 monks arrested. The unrest in Mandalay allegedly began after reports of an attempted rape of a girl by Muslim men. Myanmar's Buddhist Youth Wing asserts that officials made up the rape story to cover up protests over the custodial deaths of 16 monks. The military has denied the Youths' claim, stating that the unrest was a politically motivated attempt to stall Myanmar's entry in ASEAN.

Attacks by Buddhist monks spread to the then capital of Myanmar, Rangoon as well as to the central towns of Pegu, Prome, and Toungoo. In Mandalay alone, 18 mosques were destroyed and Muslim-owned businesses and property vandalized. Copies of the Qur'an were burned. The military junta that ruled Myanmar turned a blind eye to the disturbances as hundreds of monks were not stopped from ransacking mosques.

=== Riots in Sittwe and Taungoo (2001) ===
Tension between Buddhists and Muslims was also high in Sittwe. The resentments are deeply rooted, and result from both communities feeling that they are under siege from the other. The violence in February 2001 flared up after an incident in which seven young Muslims refused to pay a Rakhine stall holder for cakes they had just eaten. The Rakhine seller, a woman, retaliated by beating one of the Muslims, according to a Muslim witness. He attested that several Muslims then came to protest and a brawl ensued. One monk nearby tried to solve that problem but was hit over the head by the angry Muslim men and started to bleed and died. Riots then broke out. A full-scale riot erupted after dusk and carried on for several hours. Buddhists poured gasoline on Muslim homes and properties and set them alight. Four homes and a Muslim guest house were burned down. Police and soldiers reportedly stood by and did nothing to stop the sectarian violence initially. There are no reliable estimates of the death toll or the number of injuries. No one died according to some Muslim activists but one monk was killed. The fighting took place in the predominantly Muslim part of town and so it was predominantly Muslim property that was damaged.

In 2001, Myo Pyauk Hmar Soe Kyauk Hla Tai, The Fear of Losing One's Race, and many other anti-Muslim pamphlets were widely distributed by monks. Distribution of the pamphlets was also facilitated by the Union Solidarity and Development Association (USDA), a civilian organisation instituted by the ruling junta, the State Peace and Development Council (SPDC). Many Muslims feel that this exacerbated the anti-Muslim feelings that had been provoked by the destruction of the Buddhas of Bamiyan in the Bamyan Province of Afghanistan. Human Rights Watch reports that there was mounting tension between the Buddhist and Muslim communities in Taungoo for weeks before it erupted into violence in the middle of May 2001. Buddhist monks demanded that the Hantha Mosque in Taungoo be destroyed in "retaliation" for the destruction of the Buddhas of Bamiyan. Mobs of Buddhists, led by monks, vandalised Muslim-owned businesses and property and attacked and killed Muslims in Muslim communities. On 15 May 2001, anti-Muslim riots broke out in Taungoo, Bago division, resulting in the deaths of about 200 Muslims, in the destruction of 11 mosques, and setting ablaze of over 400 houses. On this day also, about 20 Muslims praying in the Han Tha mosque were beaten, some to death, by the pro-junta forces. On 17 May 2001, Lt. General Win Myint, Secretary No. 3 of the SPDC and deputy Home and Religious minister arrived and curfew was imposed there in Taungoo. All communication lines were disconnected. On 18 May, the Han Tha mosque and Taungoo Railway station mosque were razed by bulldozers owned by the SPDC. The mosques in Taungoo remained closed until May 2002, with Muslims forced to worship in their homes. After two days of violence the military stepped in and the violence immediately ended. There also were reports that local government authorities alerted Muslim elders in advance of the attacks and warned them not to retaliate to avoid escalating the violence. While the details of how the attacks began and who carried them out were unclear by year's end, the violence significantly heightened tensions between the Buddhist and Muslim communities.

=== 2012 Rakhine State riots ===
Since June 2012, at least 166 Muslims and Rakhine have been killed in sectarian violence in the state.

=== 2013 anti-Muslim riots in Myanmar ===
Since March 2013, riots have flared up in various cities in central and eastern Myanmar. The violence has coincided with the rise of the 969 Movement which is a Buddhist nationalist movement against the influx of Islam in traditionally Buddhist Myanmar. Led by Sayadaw U Wirathu, "969" has claimed that he/they do not provoke attacks against Muslim communities, although some people have called him the Buddhist Bin Laden". In an open letter, U Wirathu claims he treated both journalist, Hannah Beech and photographer with hospitality during the interview for TIME magazine, and that he "could see deceit and recognize his sweet words for all people's sake." In the letter, he claims he has respect for the Western media, but that the TIME reporter misinterpreted his peaceful intentions. "My preaching is not burning with hatred as you say," U Wirathu says to Beech in his open letter. He goes on to say that he will "forgive the misunderstanding" if she is willing to do an about-face on the article. However, much of his public speeches focus on retaliation against Muslims for invading the country.

Michael Jerryson, author of several books heavily critical of Buddhism's traditional peaceful perceptions, stated that, "The Burmese Buddhist monks may not have initiated the violence but they rode the wave and began to incite more. While the ideals of Buddhist canonical texts promote peace and pacifism, discrepancies between reality and precepts easily flourish in times of social, political and economic insecurity, such as Myanmar's current transition to democracy."

=== 2014 Mandalay riots ===
In July, a Facebook post emerged of a Buddhist woman being raped, supposedly by a Muslim man. In retaliation, an angry, vengeful mob of 300 people started throwing stones and bricks at a tea stall. The mob went on to attack Muslim shops and vehicles and shouted slogans in Muslim residential areas. Two men – one Buddhist and one Muslim – were killed. Roughly a dozen people were injured. A curfew was imposed on 3 July.

=== 2015 mass exodus ===
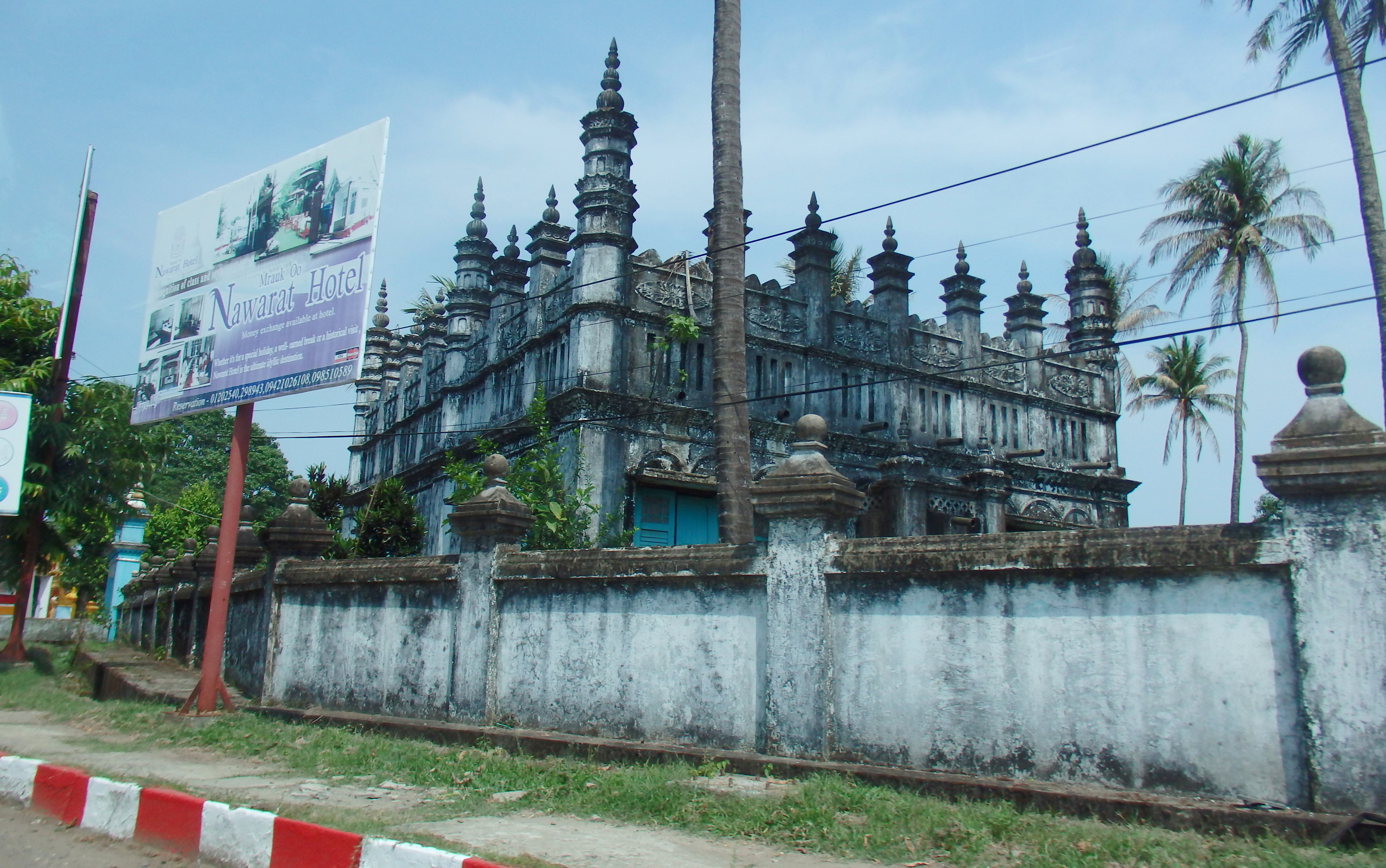
A recently closed mosque in Sittwe in May 2015

In 2015, hundreds of thousands of Rohingyas in Myanmar and Bangladesh fled from religious persecution and continued denial of basic rights in their home countries by means of boat travel, often through previously existing smuggling routes among the Southeast Asian waters. They faced incredibly harsh conditions. Many survivors reported overcrowded boats, extreme lack of food and water, and physical abuse by smugglers. Human Rights Watch gathered testimonies from people who were beaten and held for ransom in camps along the Thailand-Malaysia border, shedding light on the horrific human trafficking aspect of this crisis.

As the crisis deepened, countries like Thailand and Malaysia initially pushed boats carrying the refugees away, leaving many stranded at sea. This decision sparked outrage from human rights groups around the world. Eventually, Indonesia and Malaysia agreed to provide temporary shelter to the refugees, but only with the condition that the international community would help resettle them within a year. This tragic situation brought even more global attention to the severe mistreatment and discrimination faced by the Rohingya people in Myanmar, including their continued denial of citizenship, restrictions on their movement, and exclusion from essential services.

=== 2016 Mosque burnings ===
In June, a mob demolished a mosque in Bago Region, about 60 km northeast of the capital Yangon.

In July, police were reported to be guarding the village of Hpakant in Kachin state, after failing to stop Buddhist villagers setting the mosque ablaze. Shortly after, a group of men destroyed a mosque in central Myanmar in a dispute over its construction.

=== 2016 Rohingya persecution ===
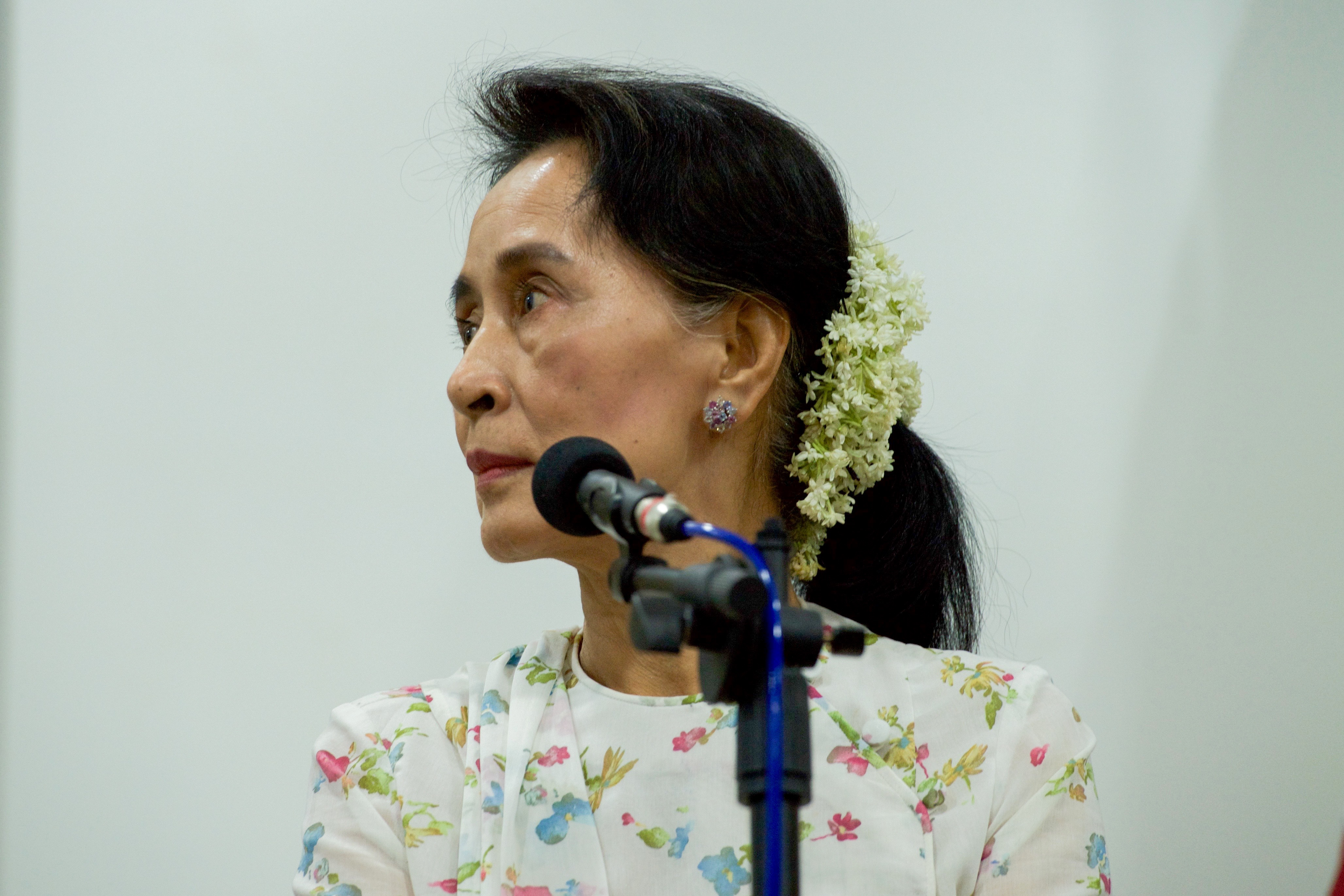
Myanmar leader Aung San Suu Kyi in 2016

In late 2016, the Myanmar military forces and extremist Buddhists started a major crackdown on the Rohingya Muslims in the country's western region of Rakhine State. The crackdown, however, was in response to attacks on police officers by Rohingya Muslims, and has resulted in wide-scale human rights violations at the hands of security forces, including extrajudicial killings, gang rapes, arsons, and other brutalities. The military crackdown on Rohingya people drew criticism from various quarters including the United Nations, human rights group Amnesty International, the US Department of State, and the government of Malaysia. The de facto head of government Aung San Suu Kyi has particularly been criticized for her inaction and silence over the issue and for not doing much to prevent military abuses.

=== 2017–present Rohingya genocide ===
In August 2018, a study estimated that more than 240+ Rohingya people were killed by the Myanmar military and the local Buddhists in retaliation to the Buddhists kllled on 25 August 2017. The study also estimated that more than 18,000 Rohingya Muslim women and girls were raped, 116,000 Rohingya were beaten, 36,000 Rohingya were thrown into fire, burned down and destroyed 354 Rohingya villages in Rakhine state, looted many Rohingya houses, committed widespread gang rapes and other forms of sexual violence against the Rohingya Muslim women and girls. The military drive also displaced a large number of Rohingya people and made them refugees. According to the United Nations reports, as of January 2018, nearly 690,000 Rohingya people had fled or had been driven out of Rakhine state who then took shelter in the neighboring Bangladesh as refugees. In December, two Reuters journalists who had been covering the Inn Din massacre event were arrested and imprisoned.

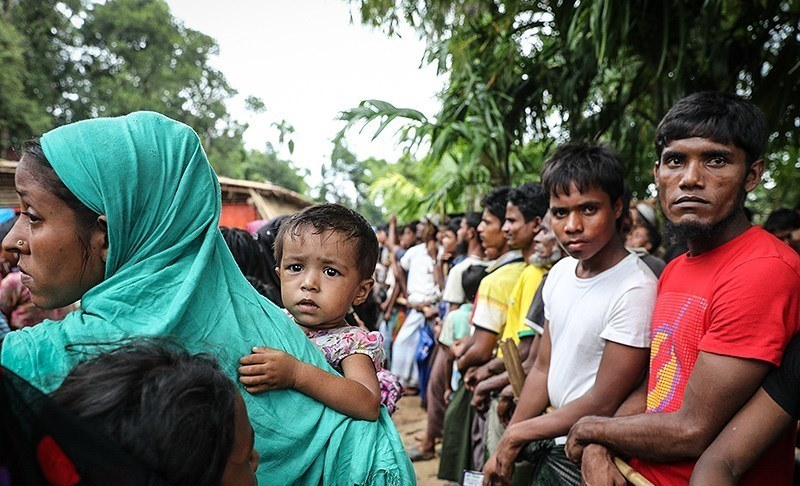
Rohingya refugees in Bangladesh in October 2017

The 2017 persecution against the Rohingya Muslims has been termed as ethnic cleansing and genocide. British prime minister Theresa May and United States Secretary of State Rex Tillerson called it "ethnic cleansing" while the French President Emmanuel Macron described the situation as "genocide". The United Nations described the persecution as "a textbook example of ethnic cleansing". In late September that year, a seven-member panel of the Italian group "Permanent Peoples' Tribunal" found the Myanmar military and the Myanmar authority guilty of the crime of genocide against the Rohingya and the Kachin minority groups. The Myanmar leader and State Counsellor Aung San Suu Kyi was again criticized her silence over the issue and for supporting the military actions. Subsequently, in November 2017, the governments of Bangladesh and Myanmar signed a deal to facilitate the return of Rohingya refugees to their native Rakhine state within two months, drawing a mixed response from international onlookers.

A Muslim butcher's home was attacked in Taungdwingyi of Magway Region on 10 September 2017 by a Buddhist mob amidst ethnic tensions. The mob also marched upon a mosque before being dispersed by the police.

In 2020, the United Nations Independent International Fact-Finding Mission on Myanmar estimated that the death toll from the violence in August 2017 could be significantly higher than previous reports, with thousands more Rohingya believed to have been killed. Furthermore, the UN’s findings detailed extensive human rights abuses, including ongoing sexual violence against Rohingya women and girls by Myanmar's military.

The international community, including the United Nations, has strongly condemned Myanmar’s actions. In response, the International Court of Justice (ICJ) ruled in 2020 that Myanmar must take immediate steps to prevent the genocide of the Rohingya people, though enforcement of this ruling remains a significant challenge.

As of 2020, over 1 million Rohingya refugees are living in overcrowded camps in Bangladesh, facing difficult living conditions with limited access to basic services, such as healthcare, education, and employment.

=== Continued impact and international responses (2020–present) ===
In 2020, the United Nations Independent International Fact-Finding Mission on Myanmar estimated that the death toll from the violence in August 2017 could be significantly higher than previous reports, with thousands more Rohingya believed to have been killed. Furthermore, the UN’s findings detailed extensive human rights abuses, including ongoing sexual violence against Rohingya women and girls by Myanmar's military.

The international community, including the United Nations, has strongly condemned Myanmar’s actions. In response, the International Court of Justice (ICJ) ruled in 2020 that Myanmar must take immediate steps to prevent the genocide of the Rohingya people, though enforcement of this ruling remains a significant challenge.

As of 2020, over 1 million Rohingya refugees are living in overcrowded camps in Bangladesh, facing difficult living conditions with limited access to basic services, such as healthcare, education, and employment.

The political situation in Myanmar further deteriorated in February 2021, when the Myanmar military (Tatmadaw) staged a coup, overthrowing the civilian government led by Aung San Suu Kyi. Following the coup, the military junta’s crackdown on dissent, as well as its ongoing persecution of ethnic minorities, including the Rohingya, intensified. The coup further isolated Myanmar from the international community, and the Rohingya continued to suffer from the systemic oppression and violence that had plagued them for years. The situation in the refugee camps in Bangladesh remains challenging, with over a million Rohingya refugees still living in extremely overcrowded conditions. The COVID-19 pandemic exacerbated the already dire situation, with limited access to healthcare, sanitation, and education in the camps. International organizations continue to call for more support and resources to address these issues.

During the 2025 Myanmar earthquake, only one mosque was approved by the State Administration Council junta to be rebuilt. Even so, the rebuilding of mosques and churches is restricted to their original size unless further permission is granted. In contrast, Buddhist sites face no such restrictions. The Gattan Mosque in Sagaing, built in 1902, was also seized and sealed by the Myanmar Police Force as an illegal building on police property; Gattan Mosque's trustees dispute the assertions by claiming that part of the land was donated to the police a decade after the mosque's construction.

The Maungdaw Myoma Mosque in Maungdaw, a mosque in Rakhine State that was built in 1818, was closed by Thein Sein's government after the 2012 Rakhine State riots. It was briefly reopened in April 2024 by the State Administration Council junta, but was closed down by the Arakan Army after it captured Maungdaw on 8 December 2024. Despite concerns by Rohingya and Kaman Muslims of deteriorating conditions and AA fighters allegedly stepping inside the mosque with their shoes on, the mosque was officially reopened on 12 September 2025.

== Human rights violations against Rohingya ==
=== Background ===
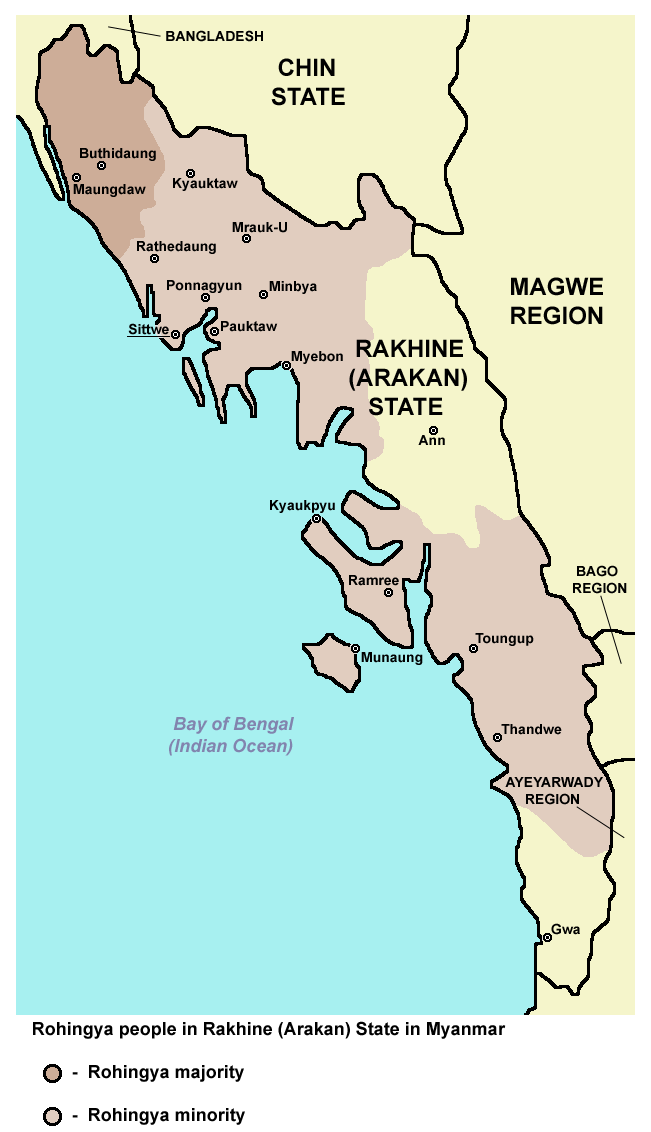
Rohingya people in Rakhine State

According to Amnesty International, the Rohingya Muslim people have continued to suffer from human rights violations under the Burmese junta since 1978, and many have fled to neighbouring Bangladesh as a result. However, the reality is that the Rohingya people have been oppressed for many years prior to 1978, though perhaps not as significantly. They have lived in Myanmar for centuries but tensions with Myanmar's Buddhist majority have caused discrimination and harassment. Cases of rape, torture, arbitrary detention, and violence against Rohingya are commonplace, with many incidents going unreported as enforcement officers turn a blind eye. These perpetrators are not solely confined to the local population, but also include the authorities and law enforcers themselves. Tensions increased in 2012, when three Rohingya Muslim men were convicted of raping a local Rakhine Buddhist woman, which led to the 2012 Rakhine State riots. There are currently over a million Rohingya people living in Myanmar, however, systemic oppression has led to an increase in migrations. In early 2015 alone, around 25,000 asylum-seekers, consisting of Rohingyas and Bangladeshis, sailed out of the Rakhine State to seek refuge in neighbouring countries. Aside from Bangladesh, the majority of asylum-seekers also set out to other South-east Asian countries such as Thailand, but also to Malaysia and Indonesia, which are predominantly Muslim countries. Mass exoduses due to persecution and mass violence, such as the one in 2012, have happened before in 1978 and 1992, with many of the fleeing Rohingya people being marginalized and excluded in host States. They are often not recognized and not protected as refugees, and as a result, they live in extreme poverty, have to resort to illegal employment and are vulnerable to exploitation.

=== Legal framework ===
The Rohingya people have been denied Burmese citizenship since the Burmese nationality law (1982 Citizenship Act) was enacted. The Government of Myanmar claims that the Rohingya are illegal immigrants who arrived during the British colonial era, and were originally Bengalis. The Rohingya that are allowed to stay in Myanmar are considered 'resident foreigners' and not citizens. They are not allowed to travel without official permission and were previously required to sign a commitment not to have more than two children, though the law was not strictly enforced. Many Rohingya children cannot have their birth registered, thus rendering them stateless from the moment they are born. In 1995, the Government of Myanmar responded to UNHRC's pressure by issuing basic identification cards, which does not mention the bearer's place of birth, to the Rohingya. Without proper identification and documents, the Rohingya people are officially stateless with no state protection and their movements are severely restricted. As a result, they are forced to live in squatter camps and slums.

=== International Conventions ===
Myanmar, otherwise known as Burma at the time, was one of the 48 countries that voted for the adoption of the Universal Declaration of Human Rights (UDHR) by the United Nations General Assembly in 1948. Article 2 of the UDHR states that "Everyone is entitled to all the rights and freedoms set forth in this Declaration, without distinction of any kind, such as race, colour, sex, language, religion, political or other opinion, national or social origin, property, birth or other status." Also, Article 5 of the UDHR states that "No one shall be subjected to torture or to cruel, inhuman or degrading treatment or punishment." However, the United Nations Convention against Torture which aims to prevent torture and other acts of cruel, inhuman, or degrading treatment or punishment, around the world, has not been signed nor ratified by Myanmar, as of 2016. In addition, Myanmar is also not a party to the Convention relating to the Status of Stateless Persons, which aims to protect stateless individuals or the International Covenant on Civil and Political Rights (ICCPR) that aims to ensure States respect individual's civil and political rights, which includes but are not limited to, the right to life and freedom of religion.

That being said, a number of international treaties have been ratified or acceded to by Myanmar, namely the Convention on the Elimination of All Forms of Discrimination against Women (CEDAW) and the Convention on the Rights of the Child (UNCRC), on 2 July 1997 and 15 July 1991 respectively. There have been slow but positive developments in recent years. For instance, Myanmar signed (but has not ratified) the International Covenant on Economic, Social and Cultural Rights (ICESCR), which protects the right to education, the right to health, and the right to an adequate standard of living, on 16 July 2015.

=== Universal Periodic Review ===
The Universal Periodic Review (UPR) is a mechanism of the United Nations (UN) that reviews the human rights records of all UN member States. It is a unique process that is undertaken by the Human Rights Council, which allows each State to recognise key areas of human rights issues that have made progress in the country, and also to identify further steps and efforts that will be taken to meet their international obligations. As a member of the UN, Myanmar is obliged to be involved in the UPR process. On 23 December 2015, a Report of the Working Group on the UPR on Myanmar looked at the current human rights situation in Myanmar and noted that the Government of Myanmar has made positive advances in political, administrative, social and judicial reforms. Nonetheless, many States, such as Sweden, Switzerland, Turkey, United Kingdom, expressed concern about, amongst other things, human rights violations against the Rohingya people, as there were still much more room for improvement in this area. For instance, Bahrain expressed concern about ethnic purification and discrimination against Rohingya Muslims in Rakhine State. It was also noted in the report that the ethnic rights protection law of 2015 would broaden the rights of all ethnic minorities in Myanmar. However, the Government of Myanmar reiterated its stance that there was no minority community in Myanmar under the name of "Rohingya". Nonetheless, the aftermath of the 2012 Rakhine State violence led to the formation of a Commission of Inquiry, which recommended that a central committee be set up for the implementation of stability and development. Since then, the Government has provided humanitarian access, such as food, water and education services, to displaced people around the Rakhine State. In addition, a project for citizenship verification was launched, which granted 900 displaced people citizenships. The Report was concluded by various recommendations from member States, with many of the States suggesting that Myanmar ratify other main human rights treaties that it is not a party to and to further enhance its international obligations towards the Rohingya people.

=== Human rights violations ===
Despite Myanmar's commitment to some international conventions, its domestic laws severely oppress various minority groups, especially the Rohingya. The 1982 Citizenship Law represents systemic discrimination at a policy level by the Government of Myanmar, which openly denies the Rohingya access to basic human rights such as access to education, employment, marriage, reproduction and freedom of movement. Rohingya people are also subjected to routine forced labour. Typically, a Rohingya man will have to give up one day a week to work on military or government projects, and one night for sentry duty. The Rohingya have also lost a lot of arable land, which has been confiscated by the military to give to Buddhist settlers from elsewhere in Myanmar. The movement of the Rohingya people are strictly limited to only a few surrounding areas and even so, a travel pass is required. If they travel without permission or overstay the time allowed on their travel pass, they are open to being prosecuted and may even receive jail sentences. Also, they will be denied entry back into their village and be forced to live away from their family. Even during emergencies, they have to apply for a travel pass, which represents a serious violation of the right of Freedom of movement.

The quality of education and health care in the Rakhine State is undeveloped and inadequate, as compared to other parts of Myanmar. Despite this, the Rohingya severely lack basic access to these services and in addition, international humanitarian agencies are not allowed to train Muslim health workers. As a result, the standard of health is severely lacking and the illiteracy rate amongst the Rohingyas is high, estimated at 80%.

There are growing concerns that a genocide is occurring against the Rohingya in Myanmar. Research done by scholars in Yale Law School found empirical evidence that the Rohingya have historically suffered serious and persistent human right abuses, and these actions have increased in frequency in recent years. Since 2012, living conditions and human rights abuses have worsened with reports of beheadings, stabbings, killings, beatings, mass arrests and villages and neighbourhoods being burned to the ground, however, there remains a lack of justice and accountability by the Government of Myanmar, thus representing failure of state protection.

As of 2005, the UNHCR had been assisting with the repatriation of Rohingya from Bangladesh, but allegations of human rights abuses in the refugee camps have threatened this effort. Despite earlier efforts by the UN, the vast majority of Rohingya refugees have remained in Bangladesh, unable to return because of the regime in Myanmar. Now they face problems in Bangladesh where they do not receive support from the government. Lack of support from the Bangladeshi Government and also human rights abuses in Bangladeshi refugee camps have led many asylum-seekers to risk their lives and to journey further south to other South-east Asian countries. The mass exodus in 2015 has led to an international humanitarian crisis because of the deliberate refusal and alleged inability of host States in South-east Asia to accommodate the vast number of asylum-seekers. Most of them are also subjected to human trafficking by organised crime groups operating in Thailand and Malaysia. These traffickers take advantage of asylum-seekers' desperation by exploiting them for money, with many of their victims being beaten, sold, or killed if they or their families do not comply with their demands. The 2015 Rohingya refugee crisis highlighted the flaws of the ASEAN community in responding to humanitarian crises, as the response from those countries were inadequate and delayed.

Human rights violations against the Rohingya are not confined only to Myanmar and Bangladesh. The status of the Rohingya is unrecognised in most Southeast Asian countries. Although they do not receive the same persecution in countries such as Malaysia and Thailand as in Myanmar, they are subjected to exclusion and poverty. There are roughly 111,000 refugees housed in nine camps along the Thai-Myanmar border. There have been charges that groups of them have been shipped and towed out to open sea from Thailand, and left there. In February 2009, there was evidence of the Thai army towing a boatload of 190 Rohingya refugees out to sea. A group of refugees rescued by Indonesian authorities in February 2009 told harrowing stories of being captured and beaten by the Thai military, and then abandoned at sea. By the end of February, there were reports that a group of five boats was towed out to open sea, of which four boats sank in a storm, and one washed up on the shore. On 12 February 2009, Thailand's prime minister Abhisit Vejjajiva said there were "some instances" in which Rohingya people were pushed out to sea.

There are attempts, I think, to let these people drift to other shores. [...] when these practices do occur, it is done on the understanding that there is enough food and water supplied. [...] It's not clear whose work it is [...] but if I have the evidence who exactly did this I will bring them to account.

October 2015, Al Jazeera's Investigative Unit has uncovered what amounts to strong evidence of a genocide coordinated by the Myanmar government against the Rohingya people. Based on much evidence, the investigation concluded that the Myanmar government agents have been involved in triggering anti-Muslim riots. An official military document shows the use of several ways, including hate speech and hiring thugs to stir hatred. The investigation stressed that in the case of the Rohingya, and Rakhine State, which could amount to the crime of genocide, several of the most powerful people in the country should reasonably be the subject of an international investigation into this situation of Rakhine State.

=== Rohingya persecution and mass exodus of 2017 ===
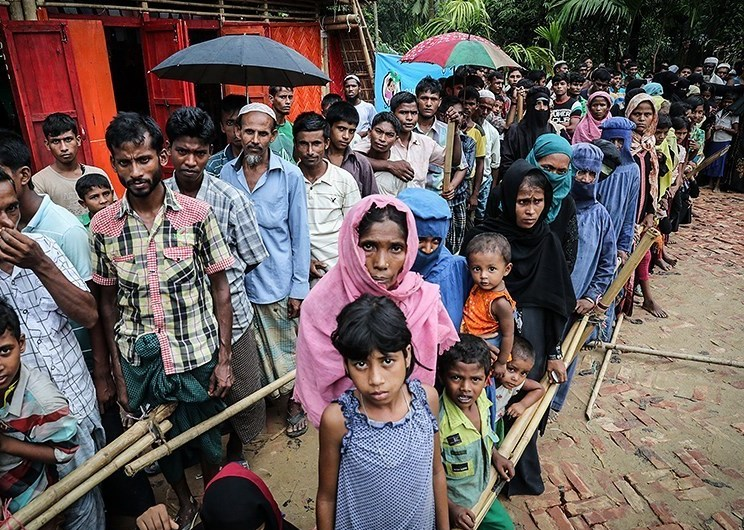
Rohingyas at the Kutupalong refugee camp in Bangladesh, October 2017

Violence broke out in northern Rakhine state on 25 August 2017, when militants attacked government forces. In response, security forces supported by Buddhist militia launched a "clearance operation" that has killed at least 1,000 people and forced more than 500,000 to flee their homes. The UN's top human rights official said on 11 September that the military's response was "clearly disproportionate" to insurgent attacks and warned that Myanmar's treatment of its Rohingya minority appears to be a "textbook example" of ethnic cleansing. Refugees have spoken of massacres in villages, where they say soldiers raided and burned their homes. Satellite analysis by Human Rights Watch has shown evidence of fire damage in urban areas populated by Rohingyas, as well as in isolated villages. The UN estimated on 7 September that 1,000 had been killed. Bangladesh's foreign minister, AH Mahmood Ali, said unofficial sources put the death toll at about 3,000. More than 310,000 people had fled to Bangladesh by 11 September. Those who have made it to the border have walked for days, hiding in jungles and crossing mountains and rivers. Many are sick and some have bullet wounds. Aid agencies have warned of a growing humanitarian crisis in overstretched border camps, where water, food rations and medical supplies are running out of stock. Most refugees are now living in established camps, makeshift settlements or sheltering in host communities. Nearly 50,000 are in new spontaneous settlements that have sprung up along the border, where access to services is especially limited. There are also fears for Rohingya people trapped in conflict zones. On 4 September, the UN said its aid agencies had been blocked from supplying life-saving supplies such as food, water and medicine to thousands of civilians in northern Rakhine state. In November 2018, Foreign Secretary Myint Thu explained that Myanmar is ready to take in 2,000 Rohingya refugees from Bangladesh camps over the coming month.

=== International response ===
There is a lack of cooperation between Thailand, Malaysia and Indonesia, with regard to the Rohingya crisis. In May 2015, as many as 8,000 Rohingya "boat people" were believed to be stranded in rickety boats at sea, with little food and unsanitary conditions, and were left in limbo as countries refused the boats to dock. Critics have accused South-east Asian governments of playing "human ping-pong" by refusing permission for these refugee boats to land and instead, pushing them back out to sea in the direction of other countries. Though at various times in the past these countries of flight have been accepting of Rohingya refugees, most of them have not signed nor ratified the Convention relating to the Status of Refugees (1951 Refugee Convention) and the Convention relating to the Status of Stateless Persons, thus the rights of the Rohingya people as refugee cannot be ensured.

Human rights violations continue to occur in Malaysia and Thailand, with little to no protection from the two countries' governments. There are no effective mechanisms in these countries for the protection of Rohingya refugees. Instead, immigration crackdowns are common and Rohingya boat people are often deported out of these countries, falling victims to slavery instead. Because of the lack of proper documentation, many Rohingya people rely on smugglers and human traffickers to help them flee from persecution in Myanmar. There has been reports that authorities in Thailand and Malaysia have connections and ties with organised human-trafficking groups and as a result, majority of the Rohingya are sold in bonded labour and do not receive protection as refugees.

In February 2009, many Rohingya refugees were helped by Acehnese sailors in the Strait of Malacca, after 21 days at sea. However, this has not led to a consistent response from the Indonesian authorities, with many Rohingyas still not being accepted at the border. The governments of these countries, especially Malaysia and Indonesia, take an especially hardline approach on refugees arriving by boat, but a more lenient approach if they are registered through the UNHCR and arrive by appropriate means. It is estimated that Malaysia currently has up to 150,000 Rohingya people within its territory.

On 5 April 2018, in a rare denunciation by the leader of a Southeast Asian neighbour, Philippines president Rodrigo Duterte told local media that "genocide" against the Rohingya was taking place in Myanmar, and said he was willing to shelter some refugees, if Europe will also shelter some as well. He later issued a public apology to Aung San Suu Kyi, saying his statement "was almost a satire", and defended her from criticism by western governments and international groups, such as the UN. One News reported in 2019 that the Philippines had "historically voted against or expressed reservations on UN resolutions concerning human rights abuses in Myanmar."

Rasheduzzaman, professor of international relations at Dhaka University, said the reformist administration of Myanmar is said to be democratic; however, there were no signs that its strategy on the Rohingya would see an improvement soon. Indeed, even the opposition democratic pioneer Aung San Suu Kyi, who had been kept under house arrest for nearly 15 of the 21 years from 1989 to 2010, is quiet on it. It implies that the humanitarian crisis on the Rohingya issue that the world sees today may have no end in sight.

In August 2016, former UN Secretary General Kofi Annan was invited to head a commission in addressing human rights violations in Rakhine.

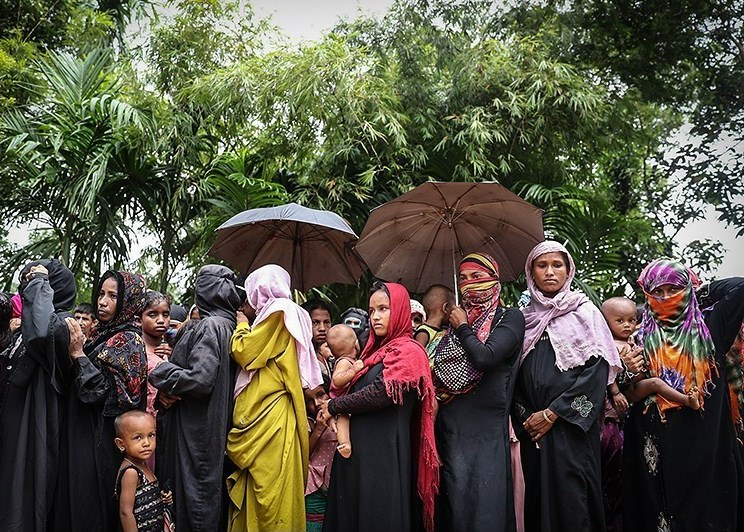
Rohingya refugees in Bangladesh, October 2017

On 3 February 2017, the UN human rights office alleged that the Myanmar military had long been engaged in a brutal rape and ethnic cleansing campaign against the country's Rohingya Muslims. On 6 February 2017, a US State Department spokesperson stated that the US was "deeply troubled" by the UN's allegations and urged the Myanmar government to take the findings seriously, but that they were also still studying how accurate the report was and would not come to any conclusion. On 8 February 2017, Pope Francis officially condemned the Myanmar government's treatment of Rohingya Muslims. The Kofi Annan Foundation also published the complete final report of the Advisory Commission on Rakhine State which was accepted by the Myanmar government in August 2017, citing 10% of the world's stateless people as having originated from Rakhine.

On 28 September 2018, Sheikh Hasina, the then prime minister of Bangladesh, spoke at the 73rd United Nations General Assembly. She said there are 1.1 million Rohingya refugees now in Bangladesh.

In August 2018, the United Nations recognized Rohingya persecution as genocide and ethnic cleansing, and called for the arrest and prosecution of Myanmar's top generals responsible for crimes against humanity. It also concluded that the government of Aung San Suu Kyi is covering up crimes against the Rohingya and failed to offer them protection.

== Gallery ==
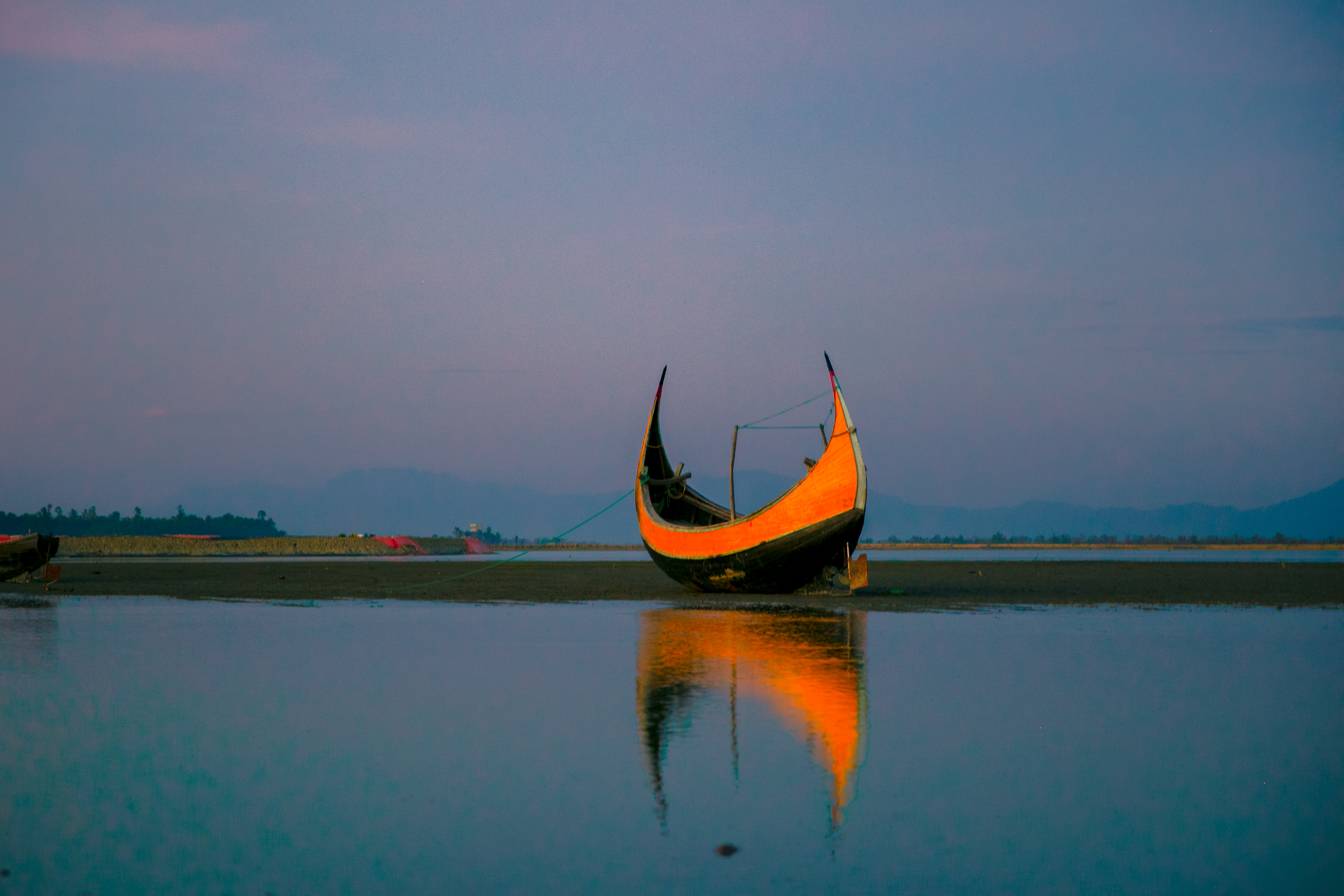
Fishing boat on the Naff river. A route used by thousands of desperate Rohingya to cross the river to take refuge in Bangladesh.

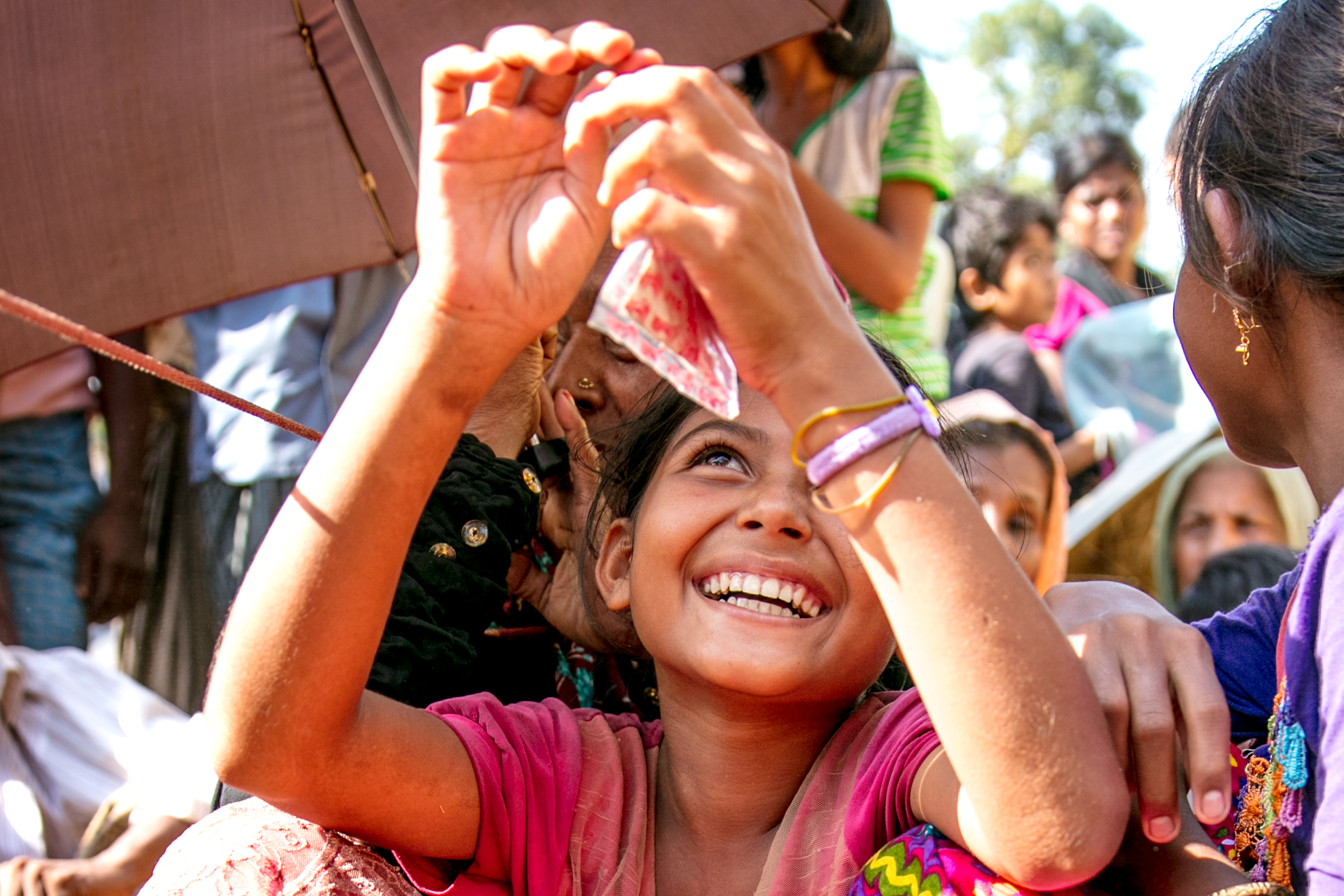
A forcedly displaced Rohingya girl queued and waiting with other hundreds to collect food and supplies at Kutupalong makeshift refugee camp.

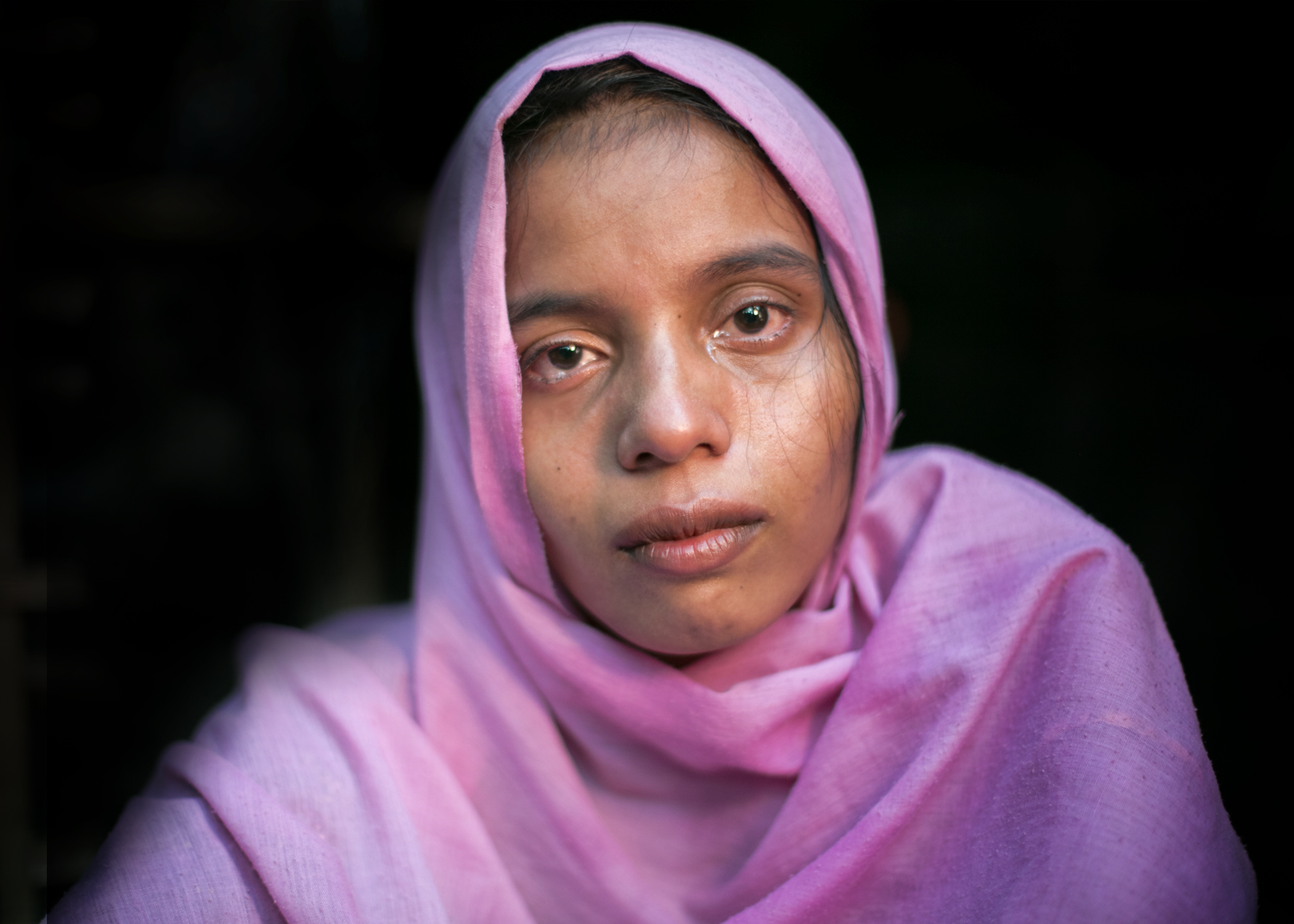
Hasina (21) witness the murder of more than 50 neighbours by the Myanmar Army, experienced extensive torture and was just lucky to survive.

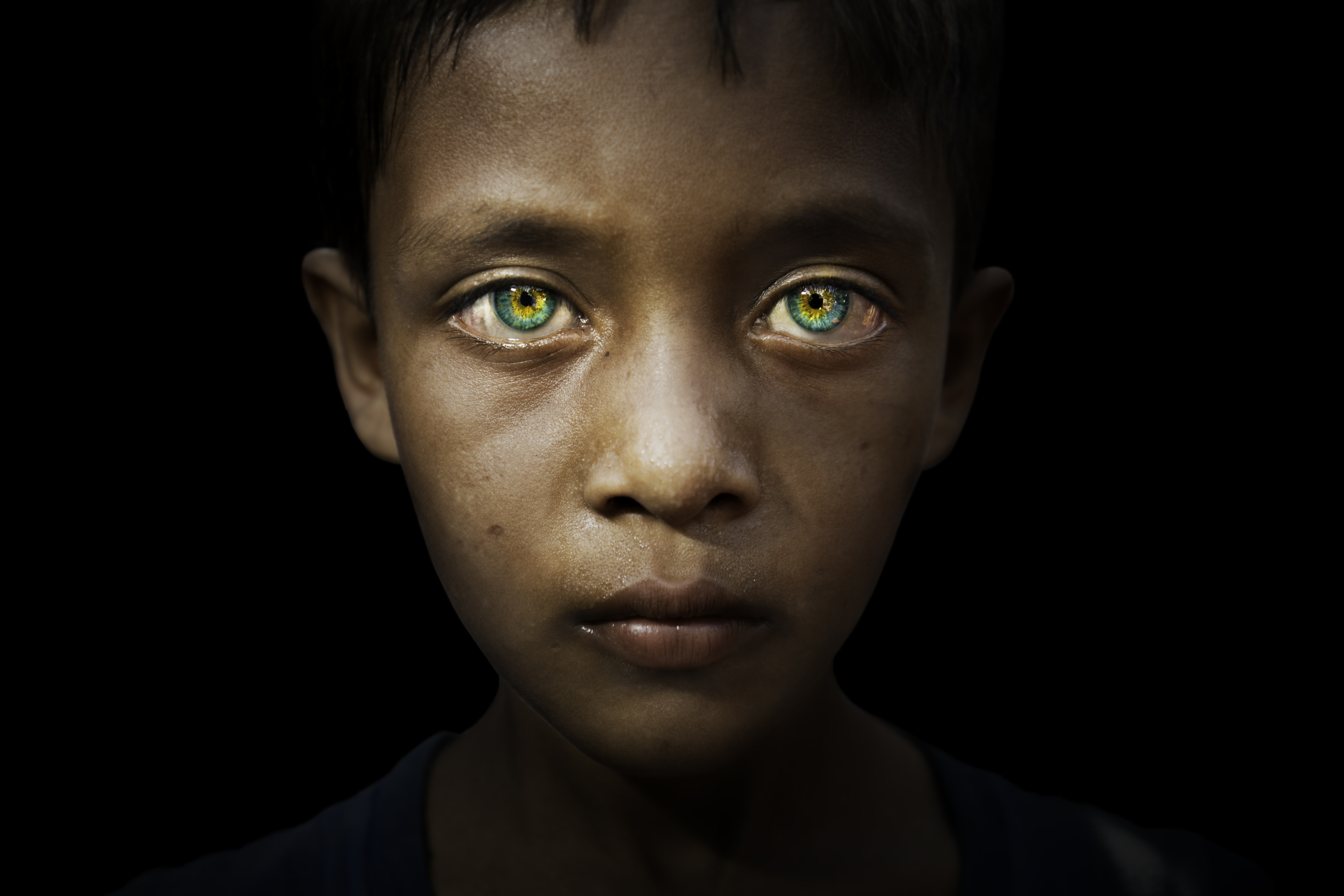
He is named as Kalar in Myanmar and Rohingya in Bangladesh. "Kalar" – a derogatory term in Myanmar used to describe Rohingya.

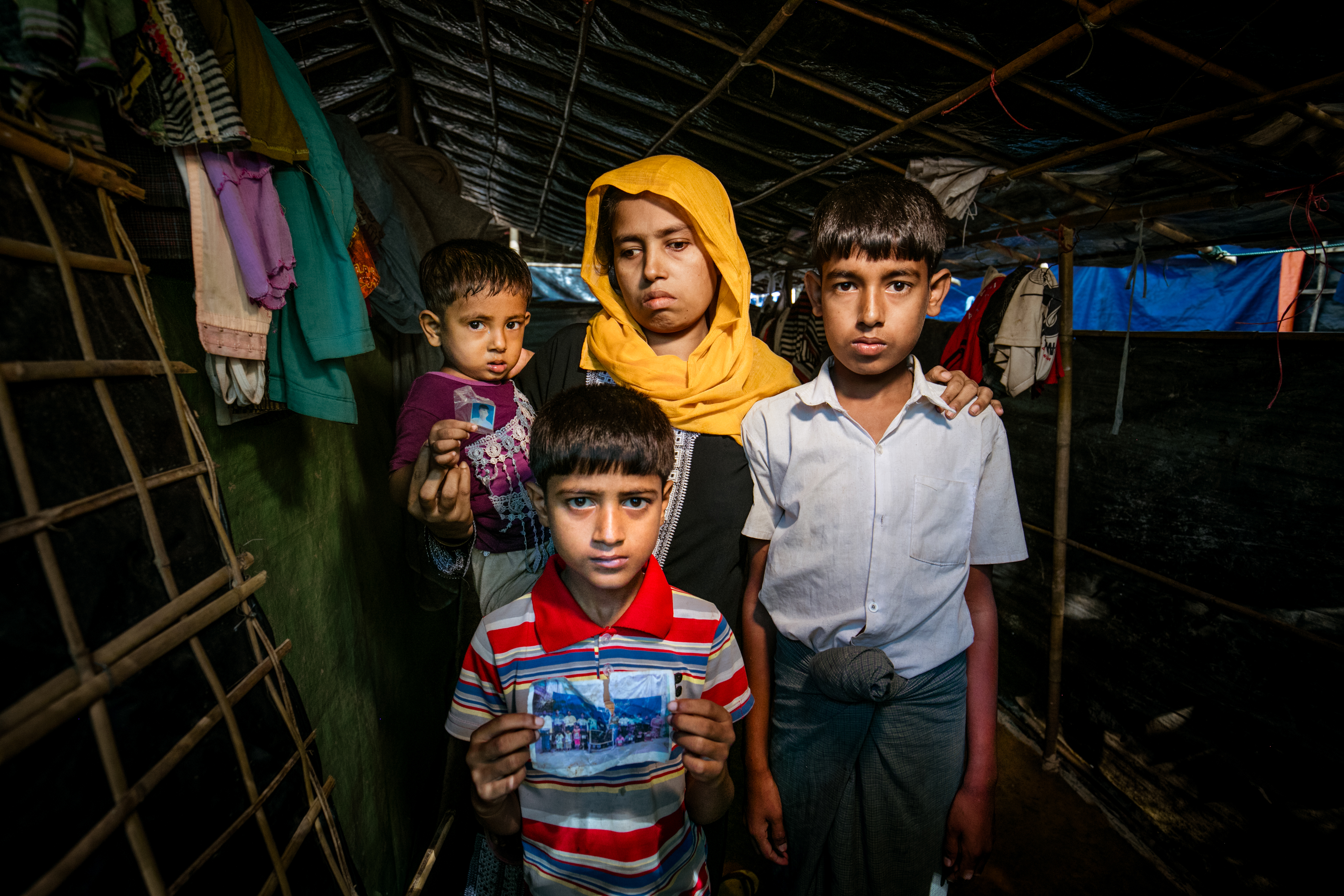
A Rohingya mother with her three children mourning for her elder son

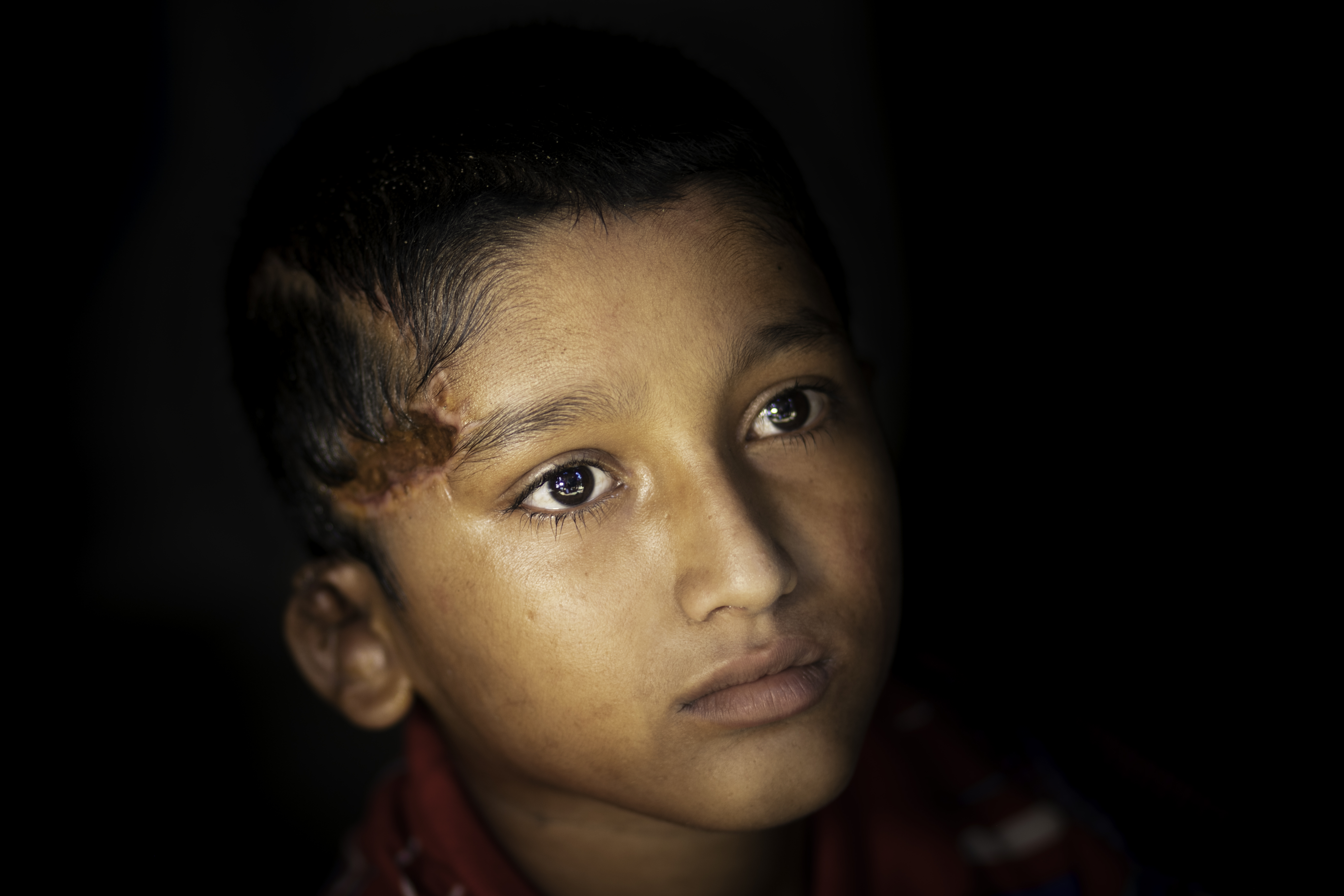
Ten-year-old Idris lost part of his ear due to a bullet and survived. He was still unable to stand on his own several months after the incident.

== See also ==
- Islam in Myanmar
- 969 Movement
- Rohingya conflict, a series of ongoing violent clashes in northern Rakhine State, Myanmar
  - Arakan massacres in 1942, commonly regarded as the event that started the conflict.
  - 2015 Rohingya refugee crisis, a mass migration of Rohingya people from Myanmar and Bangladesh, due in part to the conflict.
  - Rohingya genocide
  - 2017 Rohingya persecution in Myanmar, which included:
    - Gu Dar Pyin massacre, Massacre of Rohingya people by the Myanmar Army on 27 August 2017
    - Inn Din massacre, Massacre of Rohingya people by the Myanmar Army on 30 August 2017
    - Tula Toli massacre, Massacre of Rohingya people by the Myanmar Army on 2 September 2017
- Northern Rakhine State clashes

== Sources ==
- Amnesty International 2005 Annual Report
- Burmese Muslims Network
- Butkaew, Samart (February 2005). "Burmese Indians: The Forgotten Lives" (PDF). Burma Issues. Archived from the original (PDF) on 28 September 2007.
- "Myanmar:The Politics of Rakhine State" (PDF). International Crisis Group. 22 October 2014. Archived from the original (PDF) on 6 November 2014.
- Islamic Unity Brotherhood
- Karen Human Rights Group report, "Easy Target: The Persecution of Muslims in Burma"
- Myanmar Muslim Information Centre (MMIC)
- Myanmar Muslim political Awareness Organization
- Office of UN High Commissioner for Human Rights
- Panthay on line community
- Priestly, Harry (January 2006). "The Outsiders". The Irrawaddy. Archived from the original on 27 November 2006.
- The Conservative Party Human Rights Commission, ANNUAL REPORT 2006
- US Department of State, International Religious Freedom Report 2005 on Burma
- US Department of State, Burma, Country Reports on Human Rights Practices – 2005.Released by the Bureau of Democracy, Human Rights, and Labor
- Selth, Andrew (2003). "Burma's Muslims: Terrorists or Terrorised?" (PDF). Canberra Papers on Strategy and Defence (150). Strategic and Defence Studies Centre.
- AntiHypocrisy (30 June 2012). Thousands of Muslims Massacred by Burma's Government and People (Myanmar) – via YouTube.
