= Maungdaw Myoma Mosque =

Mosque in Rakhine, Myanmar

Coordinates: 20°49′05″N 92°21′47″E

Religion
- Affiliation: Islam
- Status: Active

Location
- Location: Maungdaw, Rakhine State
- Country: Myanmar
- Interactive map of Maungdaw Myoma Mosque

The Maungdaw Myoma Mosque is a mosque located in Maungdaw, Rakhine State, Myanmar.

== History ==
In 2012, during heightened riots in Rakhine State, the mosque was closed along with several other religious sites. It was briefly reopened in April 2024 by the State Administration Council junta, but was closed down by the Arakan Army after it captured Maungdaw on 8 December 2024. The mosque was officially reopened on September 12, 2025, after the Arakan Army commander-in-chief Twan Mrat Naing's visit in which he met with the local Muslim leaders

It served as a central place of worship for the Muslim community of Maungdaw before its closure.

== Current condition ==
The mosque is active and serves the local Muslim population.

== See also ==
- Maungdaw
- Rakhine state
- Islam in Myanmar
- Sittwe Jama Mosque
