= Sittwe Jama Mosque =

Mosque in Rakhine, Myanmar

Coordinates: 20°08′29″N 92°53′55″E

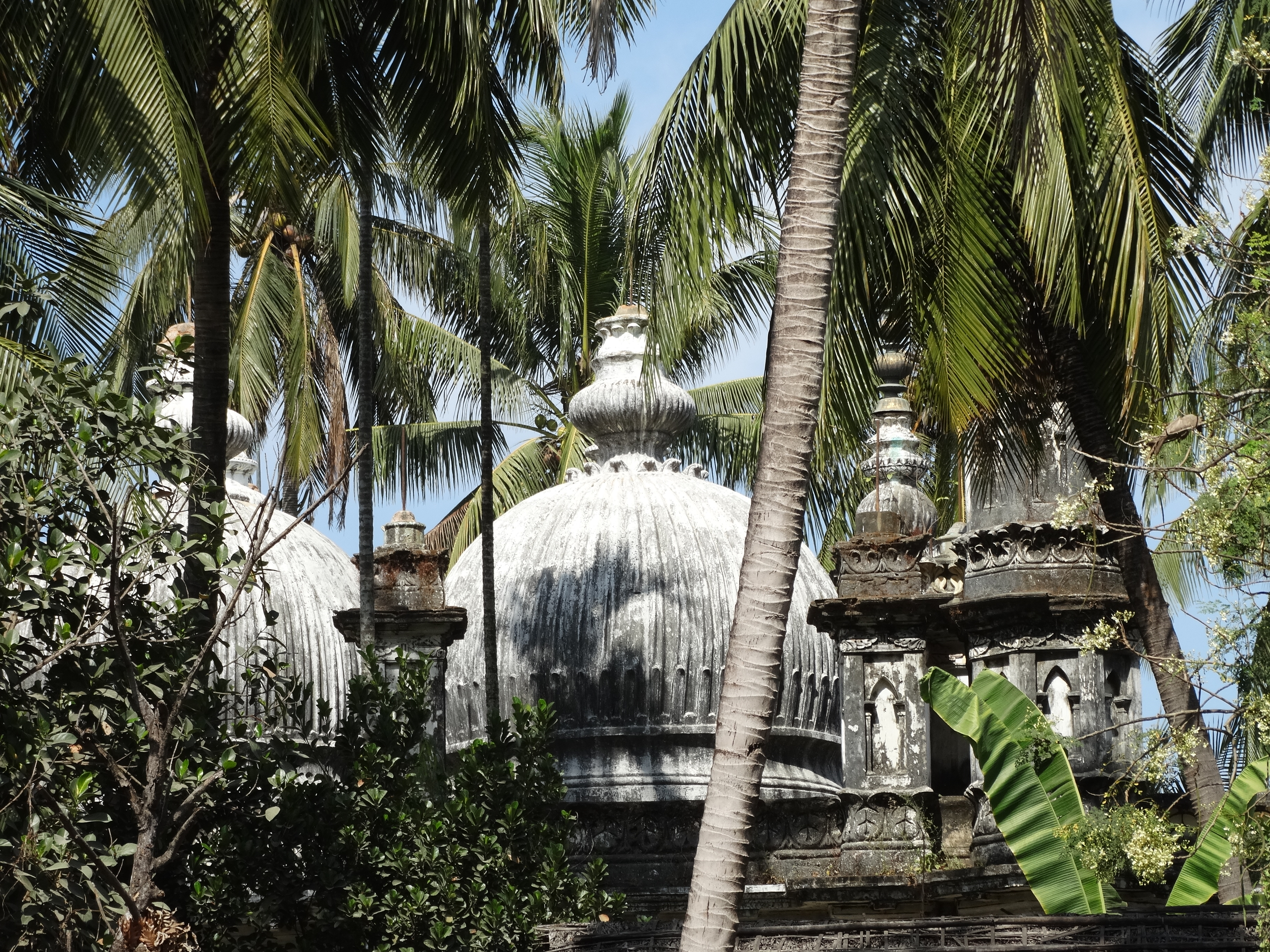
- Sittwe Jama Mosque

- Location in Myanmar

Religion
- Affiliation: Islam

Location
- Location: Sittwe, Rakhine State
- Country: Myanmar

Architecture
- Type: Mosque
- Established: 1859

The Sittwe Jama Mosque, also known as Akyab Jama Mosque, is a mosque located in Sittwe, Rakhine State, Myanmar.

== History ==
The mosque is estimated to have been built around 1859 by Mohammad Baqsh and Ilahi Jan who were brothers, making it more than 160 years old.

The mosque was closed in 2012 following communal riots.

== Current condition ==
The mosque building remains standing but reportedly without active large‑scale worship services, due to displacement of Muslims in the area.

== Gallery ==
Sittwe Jama Mosque
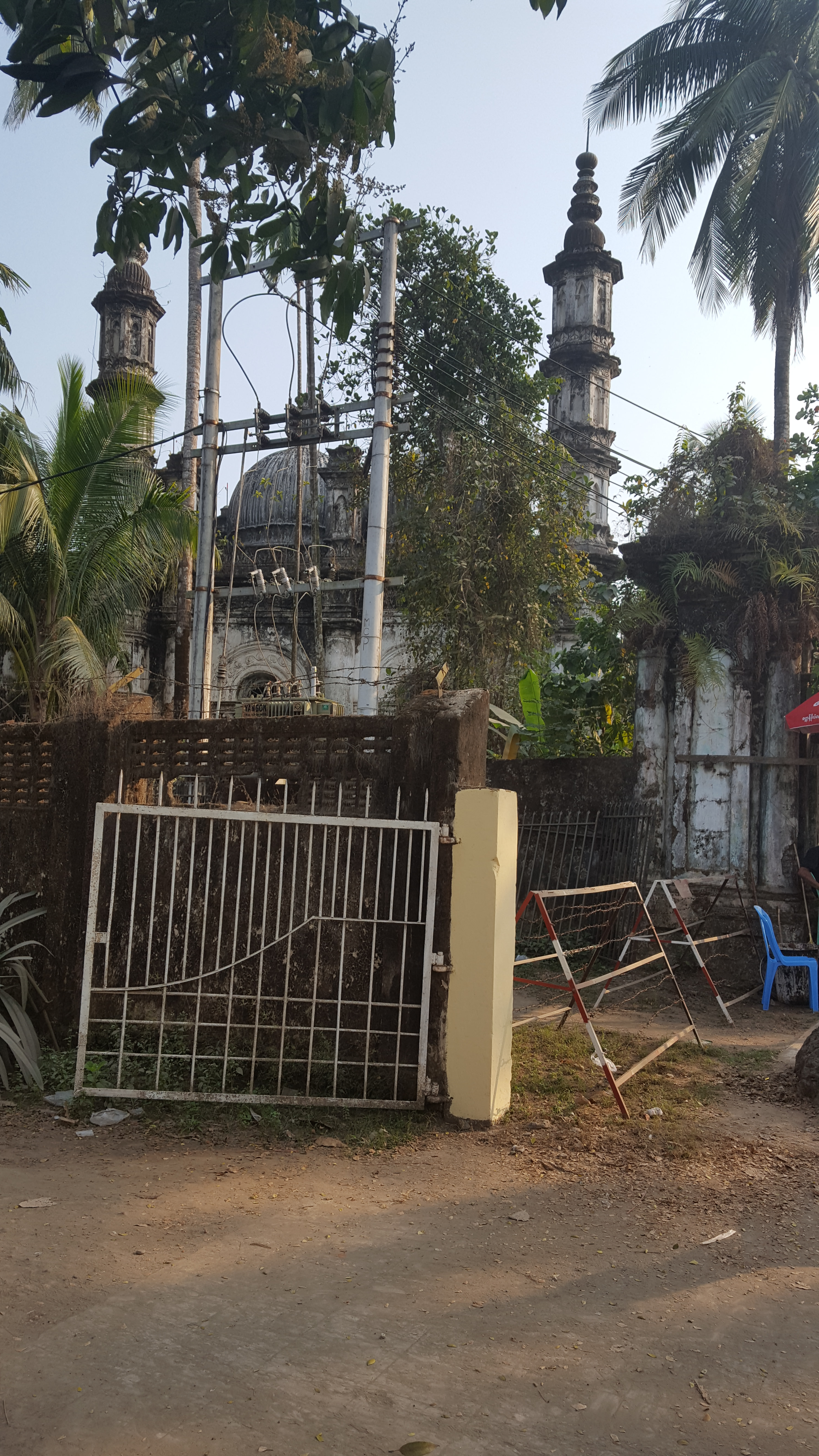
Front view

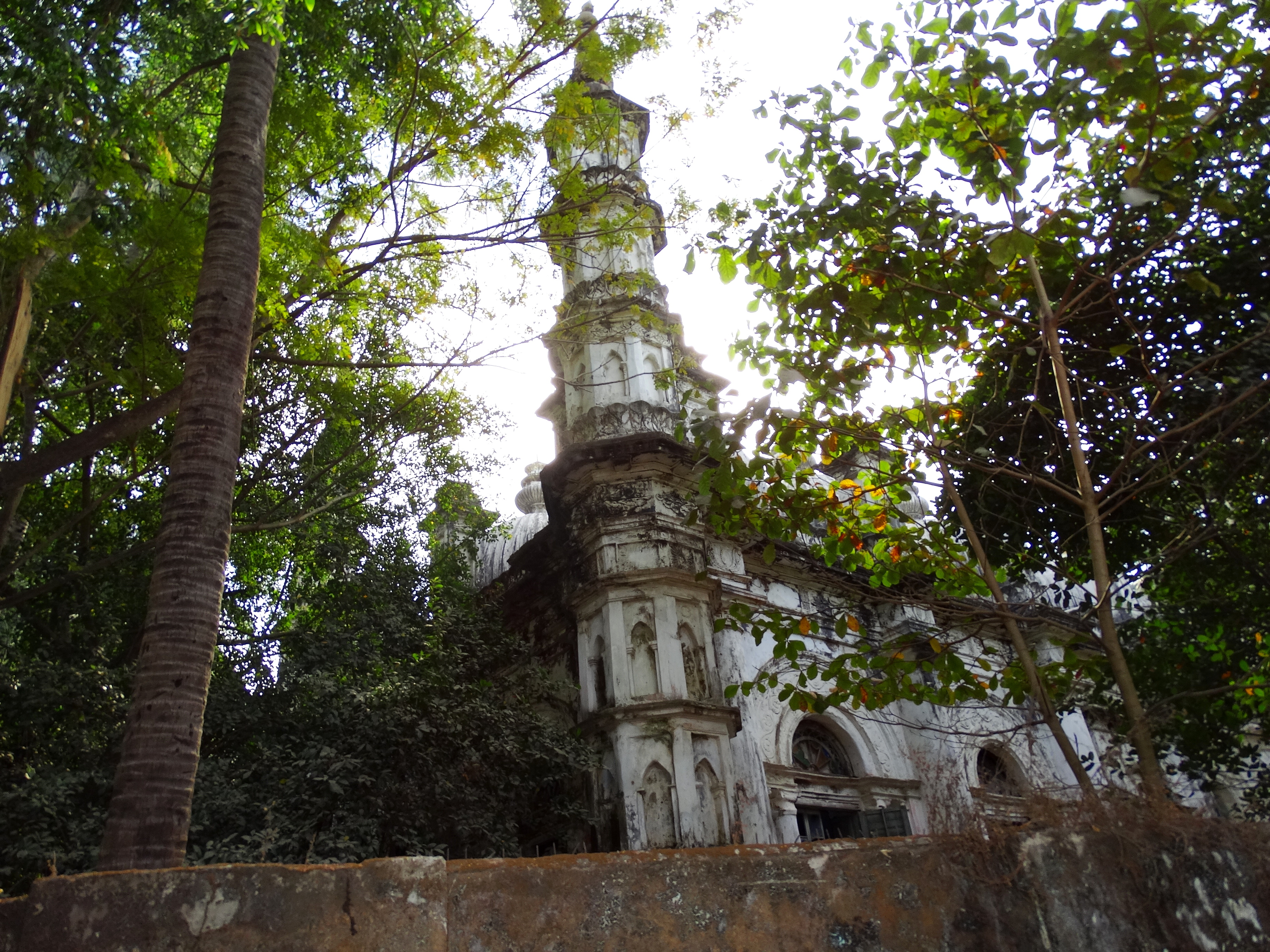
Minaret

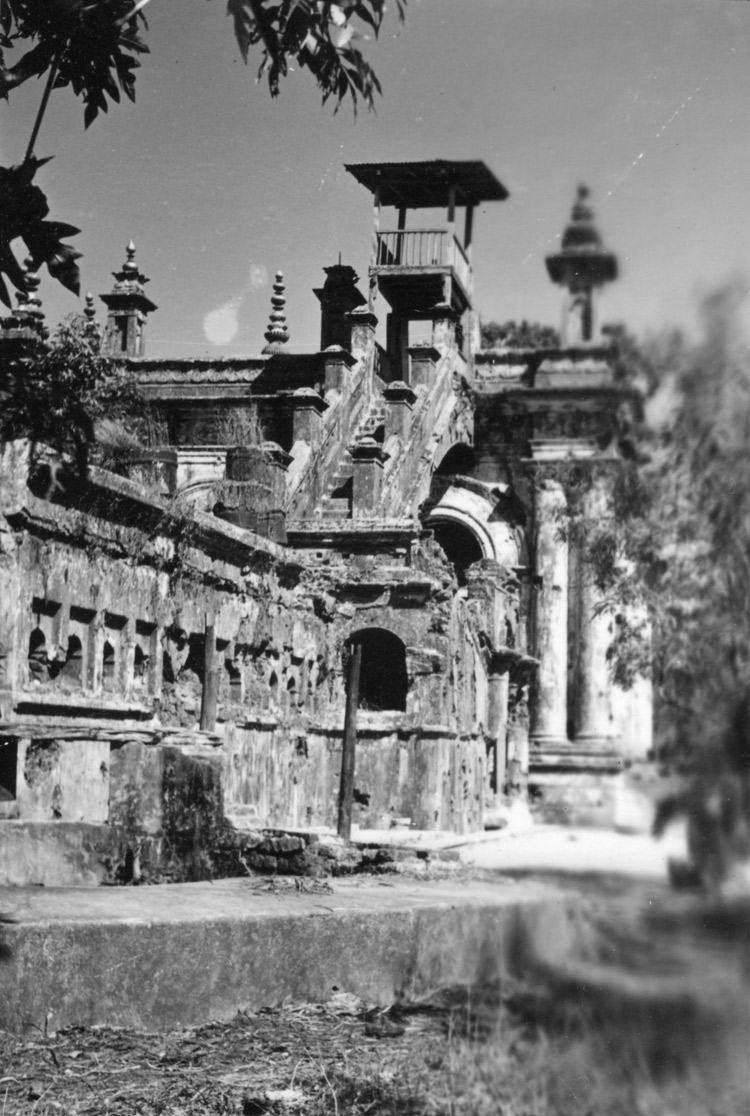
Akyab Mosque in 1945

== See also ==
- Sittwe
- Rakhine State
- Islam in Myanmar
- Maungdaw Myoma Mosque
