= 2012 Rakhine State riots =

Ethnic violence in western Myanmar

Coordinates: 20°50′N 92°29′E

- Part of the Rohingya conflict and persecution of Muslims in Myanmar
- Location: Rakhine State, Myanmar
- Date: 8 June 2012 (UTC+06:30)
- Attack type: Religious
- Deaths: June: 88; October: at least 80; 100,000 displaced

The 2012 Rakhine State riots were a series of conflicts primarily between ethnic Rakhine Buddhists and Rohingya Muslims in northern Rakhine State, Myanmar, though by October Muslims of all ethnicities had begun to be targeted. The riots came after weeks of sectarian disputes, including the gang rape and murder of a Rakhine woman, which police allege was committed by three Rohingya Muslims. On 8 June 2012, Rohingyas began to protest after Friday's prayers in Maungdaw township. More than a dozen residents were killed after police started firing. A state of emergency was declared in Rakhine, allowing the military to participate in administration of the region. As of 22 August 2012, there were 88 official casualties: 57 Muslims and 31 Buddhists. An estimated 90,000 people were displaced by the violence.

Rohingya NGOs accused the Burmese army and police of playing a role in targeting Rohingyas through mass arrests and arbitrary violence, though in-depth research by the International Crisis Group reported that members of both communities were grateful for the protection provided by the military. While the government response was praised by the United States and the European Union, NGOs were more critical, citing discrimination of Rohingyas by the previous military government. The United Nations High Commissioner for Refugees and several human rights groups rejected President Thein Sein's proposal to resettle the Rohingya abroad.

Fighting broke out again in October, resulting in at least 80 deaths, the displacement of more than 20,000 people, and the burning of thousands of homes. Rohingyas are not allowed to leave their settlements, officially due to security concerns, and are the subject of a campaign of commercial boycott led by Buddhist monks.

== Background ==
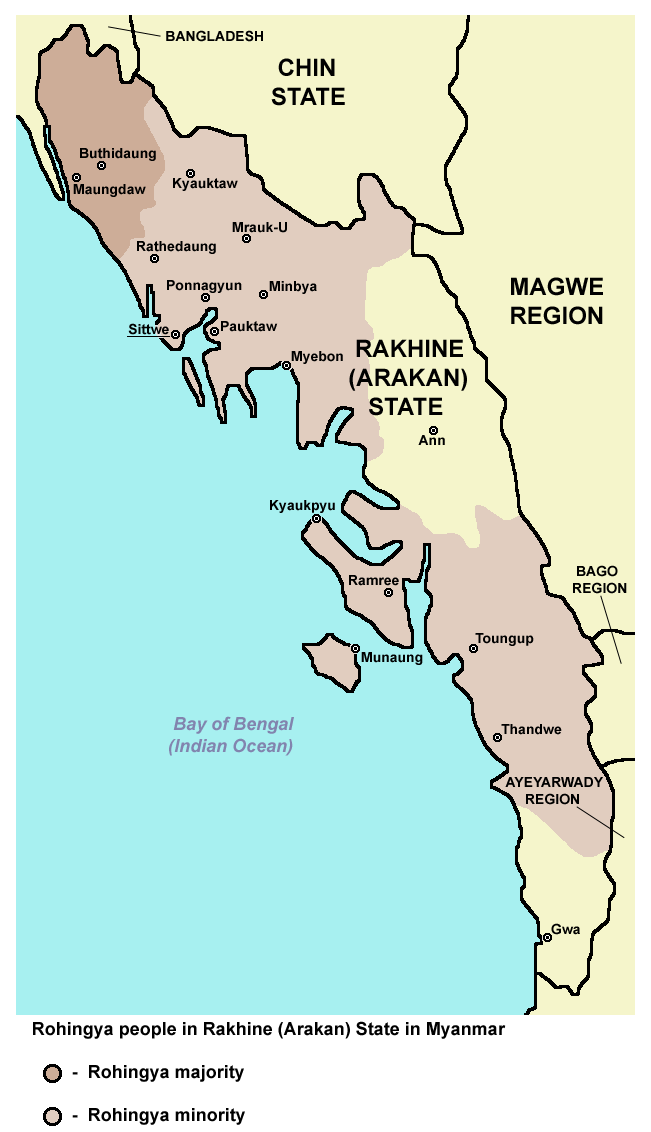
Rohingya people in Rakhine State

Sectarian clashes occur sporadically in Rakhine State, often between the Buddhist Rakhine people who are the majority in the southern part, and Rohingya Muslims who are the majority in the north. Before the riots, there were widespread and strongly held fears circulating among Buddhist Rakhines that they would soon become a minority in all of Arakan. The Burmese government classifies the Rohingya as "immigrants" to Burma and denies them full citizenship. On the back of this official perception of their lack of citizenship, they previously faced restrictions in government education, officially recognised marriages and endured forced labour under the military government.

On the evening of 28 May, three Muslim youths robbed, raped and murdered an ethnic Rakhine woman, Ma Thida Htwe, near her village Tha Pri Chaung when she was returning home from Kyauk Ni Maw village of Rambree township.

The locals claimed that the culprits were Rohingya Muslims. The police arrested three suspects and sent them to Yanbye township jail. On 3 June, a mob attacked a bus in Taungup, mistakenly believing those responsible for the murder were on board. Ten Muslims were killed in the attack, prompting protests by Burmese Muslims in the commercial capital, Yangon. The government responded by appointing a minister and a senior police chief to head an investigation committee. The committee was ordered to find out "cause and instigation of the incident" and to pursue legal action. As of 2nd July 2012, 30 people had been arrested over the killing of the Muslims.

== June 2012 riots ==
The June 2012 riots saw various attacks by Buddhist Rakhines and Rohingya Muslims on each other's communities, including destruction of property.

=== 8 June 2012: Initial attacks ===
Despite increased security measures, at 3:50 pm, 8 June 2012, a large mob of Rohingya ignited several houses in Bohmu Village, Maungdaw Township, where 80% of the population is Rohingya Muslims. Telephone lines were also damaged. By the evening, Hmuu Zaw, a high-ranking officer, reported that the security forces were protecting 14 burnt villages in Maungdaw township. Around 5:30, the forces were authorised to use deadly force. Soon afterward, authorities declared that the situation in Maungdaw Township had been stabilised. However, three villages of southern Maungdaw were torched in the early evening. At 9 o'clock, the government imposed curfew in Maungdaw, and forbade any gathering of more than five persons in a public area. An hour later, the rioters had a police outpost in Khayay Mying Village surrounded. The police fired warning shots to disperse them. At 10 o'clock, armed forces had taken positions in Maungdaw. Five people have been confirmed killed as of 8 June, 2012.

=== 9 June 2012: Riots spread ===
On the morning of 9 June, five army battalions arrived to reinforce the existing security forces. Government set up refugee camps for those whose houses had been burned. Government reports stated that Relief and Resettlement Ministry and Ministry of Defense had distributed 3.3 tons of supplies and 2 tons of clothes respectively.

The riots continued. Security forces successfully prevented rioters' attempt to torch five-quarters of Maungdaw. However, Rakhine villagers from Buthidaung Township (where 90 percent of people are Rohingya Muslims) arrived at refugee camps after their houses had been razed by rioters. Soon after, soldiers took positions and anti-riot police patrolled in the township. The Muslim rioters marched to Sittwe and burned down three houses in Mingan quarter. An official report stated that at least 7 people had been killed. One hostel, 17 shops and over 494 houses had been destroyed as of 9 June.

=== 10 June 2012: State of emergency ===
On 10 June, a state of emergency was declared across Rakhine. According to state TV, the order was given in response to "unrest and terrorist attacks" and "intended to restore security and stability to the people immediately." President Thein Sein added that further unrest could threaten the country's moves toward democracy. It was the first time that the current government used the provision. It instigated martial law, giving the military administrative control of the region. The move was criticised by Human Rights Watch, who accused the government of handing control over to a military which had historically brutalised people in the region. Ethnic Rakhine burned down Rohingya houses in Bohmu village. Over five thousand people were residing at refugee camps by 10 June. Many of the refugees fled to Sittwe to escape the rioting, overwhelming local officials.

=== 12–14 June 2012 ===
On 12 June, more buildings were set ablaze in Sittwe as many residents throughout Rakhine were relocated. "Smoke is billowing from many directions and we are scared," said one ethnic Rakhine resident. "The government should send in more security forces to protect [our] communities." An unnamed government official put the death toll at 25 to date.

The number of casualties were officially revised to 21 on 13 June. A top United Nations envoy visited the region affected by the riots. "We're here to observe and assess how we can continue to provide support to Rakhine [State]," said Ashok Nigam, UN humanitarian coordinator. The envoy later remarked that army appeared to have restored order to the region.

Meanwhile, Bangladeshi authorities turned away refugees, denying another 140 people entry into Bangladesh. To date at least 15 boats and up to 1,500 total refugees had been turned away. Dipu Moni, Foreign Minister of Bangladesh, said at a news conference in the capital, Dhaka, that Bangladesh did not have the capacity to accept refugees because the impoverished country's resources already are strained. The UN called on Bangladesh to reconsider.

On 14 June, the situation appeared calm as casualty figures were updated to 29 deaths – 16 Muslims and 13 Buddhists, according to Myanmar authorities. The government also estimated 2,500 homes had been destroyed and 30,000 people displaced by the violence. Thirty-seven camps across Rakhine housed the refugees. Opposition leader Aung San Suu Kyi warned that violence would continue unless "the rule of law" was restored.

=== 15–28 June 2012: Fatality figures update and arrest of UN workers ===
As of 28 June, casualty figures were updated to 80 deaths and estimated 90,000 people were displaced and taking refuge in temporary camps according to official reports. Hundreds of Rohingyas fled across the border to Bangladesh, though many were forced back to Burma. Rohingyas who fled to Bangladesh also claimed that the Burmese army and police shot groups of villagers. They stated they feared to return to Burma when Bangladesh rejected them as refugees and asked them to go back home.

The Government of Myanmar arrested 10 UN UNHCR workers and charged three with "stimulating" the riots. António Guterres, the UN High Commissioner for Refugees, visited Yangon and asked for the release of the UN workers which Myanmar's President Thein Sein said he would not allow but asked if the UN would help to resettle up to 1,000,000 Rohingya Muslims in either refugee camps in Bangladesh or another country. The UN rejected Thein Sein's proposal.

== October riots ==
Violence between Muslims and Buddhists broke out again in late October. According to the Burmese government, more than 80 people were killed, more than 22,000 people were displaced, and more than 4,600 houses burnt. The outburst of fighting brought the total number of displaced since the beginning of the conflict to 100,000.

The violence began in the towns of Min Bya and Mrauk Oo, but spread across the state. Muslims of all ethnicities were reported to be targets of the violence in retaliation. Several Muslim groups announced that they would not be celebrating Eid al-Adha because they felt the government could not protect them.

UN Secretary-General Ban Ki-moon issued a statement on 26 October that "the vigilante attacks, targeted threats and extremist rhetoric must be stopped. If this is not done ... the reform and opening up process being currently pursued by the government is likely to be jeopardised." US State Department spokeswoman Victoria Nuland called on the Burmese government to halt the violence and allow aid groups unrestricted access. On 27 October, a spokesperson for Thein Sein acknowledged "incidents of whole villages and parts of the towns being burnt down in Rakhine state", after Human Rights Watch released a satellite image showing hundreds of Muslim buildings destroyed in Kyaukpyu on Ramree Island. The United Nations reported on 28 October that 3,200 more displaced people had fled to refugee camps, with an estimated additional 2,500 still in transit.

In early November, Doctors Without Borders reported that pamphlets and posters were being distributed in Rakhine State threatening aid workers who treated Muslims, causing almost all of its local staff to quit.

== Misleading photographs in the media ==
Alleged photographs of crimes against Muslims perpetrated by Buddhists in Rakhine State had been widely circulated during and after the riots. Some of the photos were taken from natural disasters, such as pictures of Tibetan Buddhist monks cremating earthquake victims from the 2010 Yushu earthquake, mislabeled as Burmese monks burning Muslims alive. These were often circulated through Facebook, a popular social media website in Myanmar.

== Aftermath ==
=== Expulsion of Muslims from Sittwe ===
After the riots, most of the Muslims from Sittwe were removed by security forces into makeshift refugee camps well away from the city, towards Bangladesh. Only few hundred households were left in the ghetto-like Mingalar Ward where they are confined, officially due to security concerns. Rakhine Buddhists called for further internment and expulsion of Rohingya Muslims towards Bangladesh or the Bay of Bengal who cannot prove three generations of legal residence - a large part of the nearly one million Muslims from the state. The Sittwe Jama Mosque was reportedly closed.

=== Rohingya diaspora ===
Around 140,000 people, the majority of them Rohingya Muslims, were displaced by two waves of organized violence between Buddhists and Muslims in Rakhine in 2012 that left some 200 people dead. Thousands of Rohingya have fled Myanmar since then, on overcrowded boats to Malaysia or further south, despite the dangers posed by rough seas. Hundreds are believed to have died at sea in 2013. In May, nearly 60 Rohingyas went missing after their boat sank after hitting rocks as a cyclone approached the bay.

In November, another boat carrying 70 Rohingyas fleeing sectarian violence capsized off the western coast of Myanmar. Only eight survivors have been found. According to The Economist, later Burmese Buddhist mob violence against Rohingya Muslims in such places as Meiktila, Okpho and Gyobingauk Township "follows on from, and is clearly inspired by, the massacres of Rohingya Muslims around Sittwe" and "now seems to be spreading to other parts of Asia, too".

=== Investigation ===
An investigation committee was formed on 28 March, 2014 by the Burmese government to take action against the people involved in riots on 26 and 27 March, 2014. The report on riots was submitted by 7 April, 2014 to the president.

On 30 May, 2018, the Burmese government announced their latest International Commission of Enquiry (ICOE) to investigate the human rights violations that occurred in the Rakhine State. The spokesperson for the Office of the President stated, "We have formed the Independent Commission of Enquiry to response [sic] to false allegations made by the UN Agencies and other international communities.”

The International Committee of Jurists (ICJ) released a five-page legal briefing stating that the ICOE "cannot reasonably be seen as having any chance of being independent, impartial, or making an effective contribution to justice or accountability for the crimes under international law", and called for the UN Human Rights Council to create an impartial tribunal to collect evidence for potential future prosecutions.

== International reactions ==
On 5 April 2013, Muslim and Buddhist inmates at an immigration detention centre in Indonesia rioted along the lines of the conflict in their home country leading to death of 8 Buddhists and 15 injuries of Rohingyas. According to the testimonies of Rohingya witnesses, the reason that sparked the riot was because of sexual harassment against female Rohingya Muslim inmates by the Burmese Buddhist inmates. Indonesian court jailed 14 Muslim Rohingya for nine months each in December. The men's lawyer said they would appeal for freedom because there was no real evidence shown during the trial.

=== India ===
A Rohingya refugee colony gradually grew in New Delhi, as Bangladeshi refugees and Rohingya refugees settled here. By 2018, the colony had grown to more than 30,000 people.

In August 2012, about 20,000 Indians, gathered in Mumbai's Azad Maidan to protest the treatment of Rohingyas in Rakhine state. The protest grew violent. Protesters began to riot and set fire to the offices and establishments in the vicinity. The police was outnumbered and the riots continued for 5 days.

The riots started off initially as a protest organized in Azad Maidan on 11 August 2012 to condemn the Rakhine riots and Assam riots, which later turned into a riot. The riot reportedly began as the crowd got angry either after hearing an inflammatory speech or after seeing photographs of Assam violence and Rakhine state riots. The riot resulted in two deaths and injuries to 54 people including 45 policemen. Mumbai Police estimated that the riots caused a loss of ₹ 2.74 crore in damages to public and private property.

== Reactions ==
=== Domestic ===
- National League for Democracy – The NLD appealed to the rioters to stop.
- 88 Generation Students Group – 88 Generation Students leaders called the riots "acts of terrorism" and acts that have "nothing to do with Islam, Buddhism, nor any other religion."
- All Myanmar Islam Association – All Myanmar Islam Association, the largest Islam association in Myanmar, condemned the "terrorizing and destruction of lives and property of innocent people", declaring that "the perpetrators must be held accountable by law."
- Some local analysts believe the riots and conflict were instigated by the military, with the aim to embarrass Aung San Suu Kyi during her European tour, to reassert their own authority, or to divert attention from other conflicts involving ethnic minorities across the country.
- In August 2012 President Thein Sein announced the establishment of a 27-member commission to investigate the violence. The commission would include members of different political parties and religious organisations.

=== International ===
- European Union – Earlier in 2012, the EU lifted some of its economic and political sanctions on Myanmar. As of 22 July, EU diplomats were monitoring the situation in the country and were in contact with its officials.
- Organisation of Islamic Cooperation – On 15 August, a meeting of the OIC condemned Myanmar authorities for violence against Rohingyas and the denial of the group's citizenship, and vowed to bring the issue to the United Nations General Assembly. In October, the OIC had reached an agreement with the Burmese government to open an office in the country to help the Rohingyas; however, following Buddhist pressure, the move was abandoned.
- Bangladesh – Neighbouring Bangladesh increased border security in response to the riots. Numerous boat refugees were turned aside by the Border Guard.
- Pakistan – Foreign Ministry spokesman Moazzam Ali Khan said during a weekly news briefing: "We are concerned about the situation, but there are reports that things have improved there." He added that Pakistan hoped Burmese authorities would exercise necessary steps to bring the situation back to control. Protests against the anti-Muslim riots were lodged by various political parties and organisations in Pakistan, who called for the government, United Nations, OIC and human rights organisations to take notice of the killings and hold Myanmar accountable.
- Saudi Arabia – The King Abdullah ordered $50 million of aid sent to the Rohingyas, in Saudi Arabia's capacity as a "guardian of global Muslim interests". Council of Ministers of Saudi Arabia says that it "condemns the ethnic cleansing campaign and brutal attacks against Myanmar's Muslim Rohingya citizens" and it urged the international community to protect "Muslims in Myanmar".
- United Kingdom – Foreign Minister Jeremy Browne told reporters that he was 'deeply concerned' by the situation and that the UK and other countries would continue to watch developments closely.
- United States – Secretary of State Hillary Clinton called for "all parties to exercise restraint" and added that "the United States continues to be deeply concerned" about the situation.
- Tibet — The 14th Dalai Lama, the spiritual leader of Tibet in exile, wrote a letter in August 2012 to Aung San Suu Kyi, where he said that he was "deeply saddened" and remains "very concerned" with the violence inflicted on the Muslims in Burma. In April 2013, he openly criticised Buddhist monks' attacks on Muslims in Myanmar saying "Buddha always teaches us about forgiveness, tolerance, compassion. If from one corner of your mind, some emotion makes you want to hit, or want to kill, then please remember Buddha's faith. We are followers of Buddha." He said that "All problems must be solved through dialogue, through talk. The use of violence is outdated, and never solves problems." In May 2013, while visiting Maryland, he said "Really, killing people in the name of religion is unthinkable, very sad."

== See also ==
- 2012 Ramu violence
- 2013 Myanmar anti-Muslim riots
- 2015 Rohingya refugee crisis
- Rohingya conflict
- Rohingya genocide
- Sittwe (film), a 2017 short documentary film about two teenagers affected by the riots
