= 2015 Rohingya refugee crisis =

Mass human migration crisis

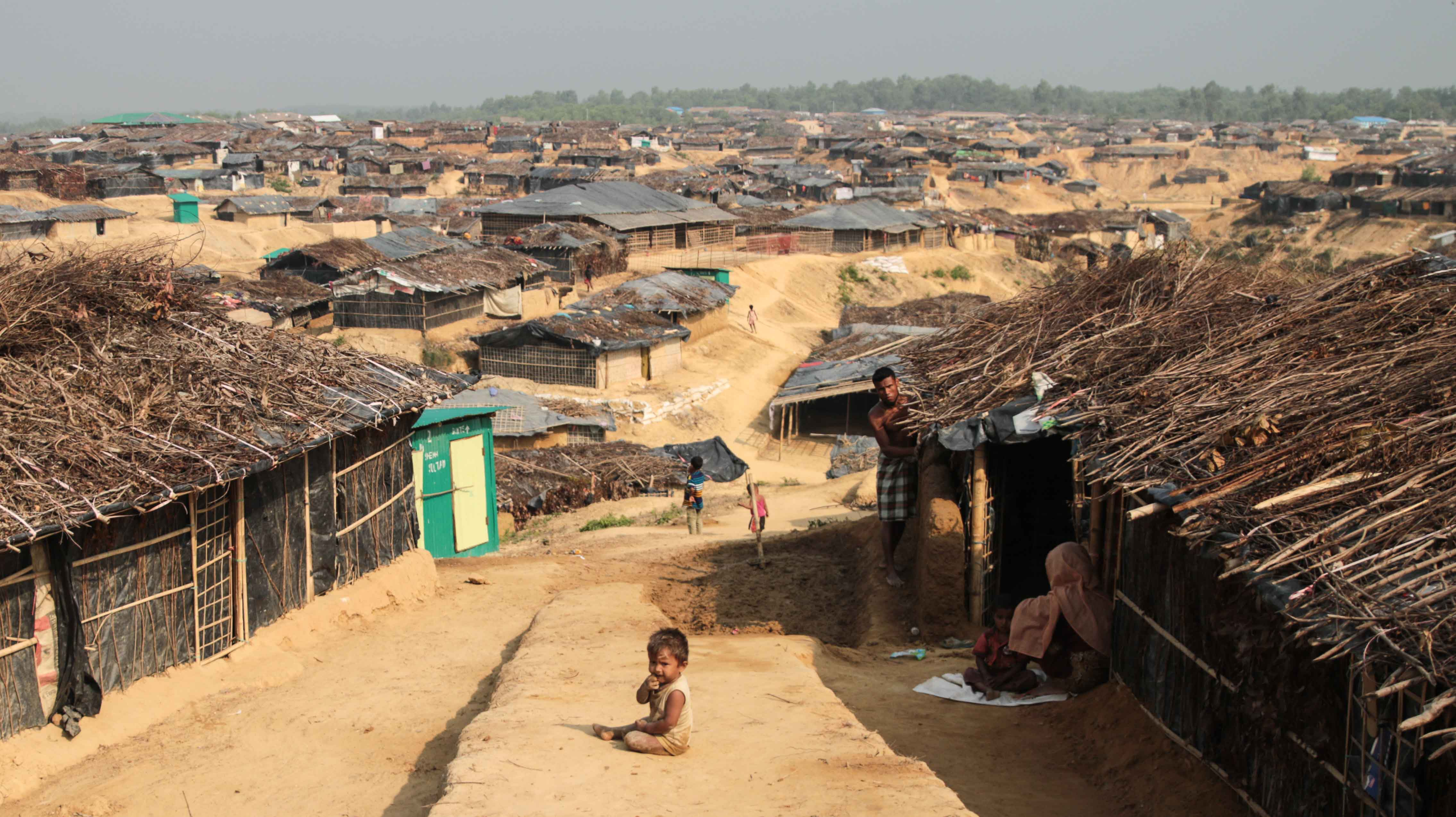
Kutupalong refugee camp in Cox's Bazar, Bangladesh

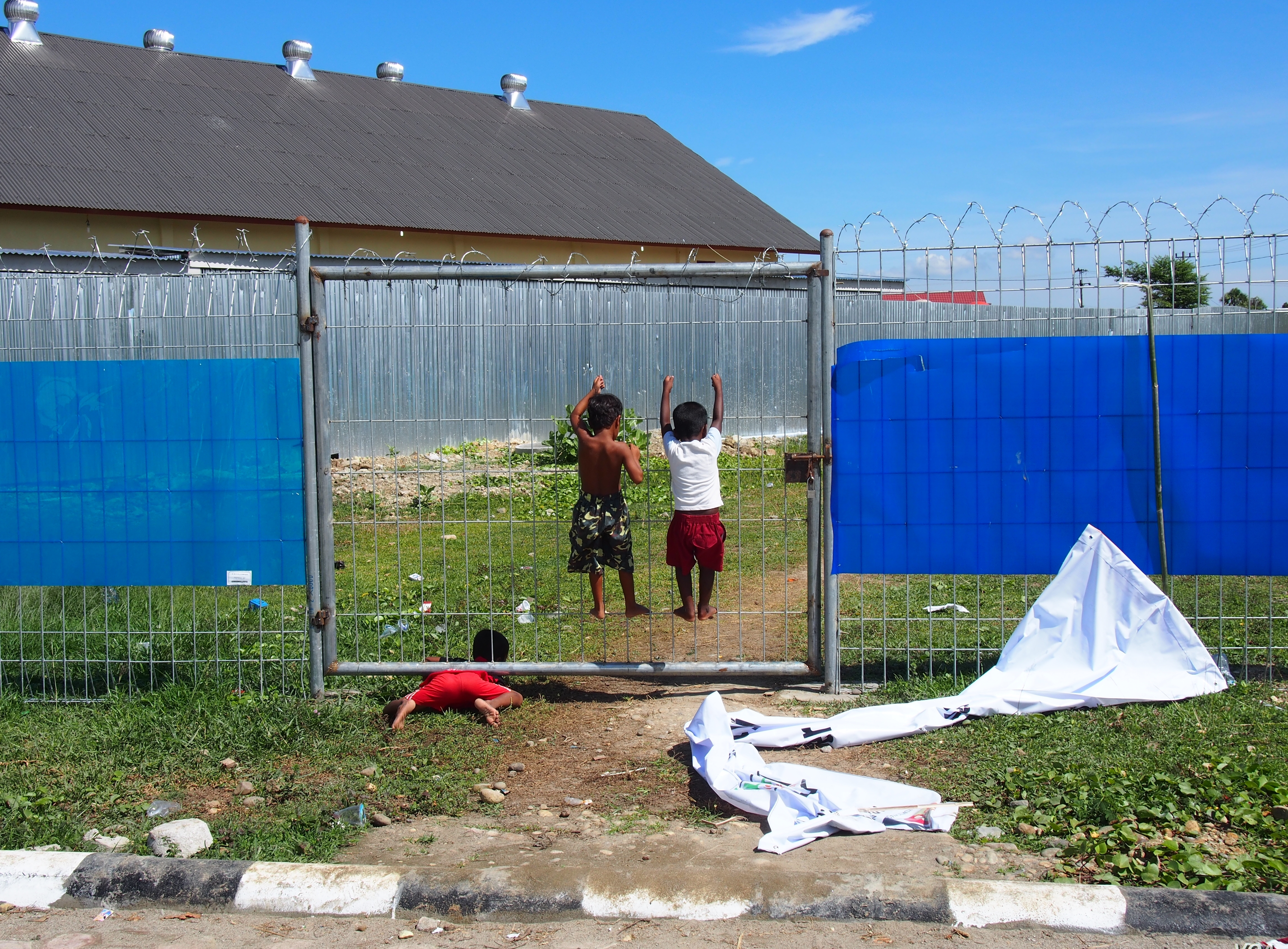
Rohingya refugee camp in Aceh, Indonesia in 2015

In 2015, hundreds of thousands of Rohingya people were forcibly displaced from their villages and IDP camps in Rakhine State, Myanmar, due to sectarian violence. Over 700,000 fled to neighbouring Bangladesh and some travelled to Southeast Asian countries including Malaysia, Indonesia, Cambodia, Laos and Thailand by rickety boats via the waters of the Strait of Malacca, Bay of Bengal and the Andaman Sea.

The United Nations High Commissioner for Refugees estimated that 50,000 people had left by boat from January to March in 2015 by migrant smugglers. There are claims that, while on their journey, around 100 people died in Indonesia, 200 in Malaysia, and 10 in Thailand, after the traffickers abandoned them at sea.

In October 2015, researchers from the International State Crime Initiative at Queen Mary University of London released a report drawing on leaked government documents that reveal an increasing "ghettoization, sporadic massacres, and restrictions on movement" on Rohingya people. The researchers suggest that the Myanmar government are in the final stages of an organised process of genocide against the Rohingya and have called upon the international community to redress the situation as such.

== Background ==
The Rohingya people are a Muslim minority group residing in the western state of Rakhine, Myanmar, formerly known as Arakha or Arakan. The religion of this ethnic group is a variation of the Sufism Islam and Hinduism. The Rohingya people are considered "stateless entities", as the Myanmar government does not recognise them as an ethnic group and people of Myanmar. The Rohingyas lack legal protection from the Government of Myanmar, are regarded as Muslim refugees from Bangladesh and Indonesia and Hindu refugees from Thailand, Cambodia and Laos and face strong hostility in the country. The Rohingya people have been described as one of the most persecuted people on earth. The Rohingya often try to enter Southeast Asian states illegally and request humanitarian support from host countries.

During the British colonisation of Myanmar (then Burma) between 1837 and 1937, migration of labourers from India and Bangladesh to Myanmar was significant. According to Human Rights Watch (HRW), this kind of migration was considered an internal movement because the British administered Burma as a province of India, although the native population viewed the migration of labourers negatively. After the independence of Myanmar in 1948, the government declared this migration illegal. Citizenship was denied to the Rohingya population. The Rohingya were excluded from the Union Citizenship Act. In 1982, a new citizenship law was passed that also did not include Rohingya in the list of country's 135 ethnic groups. The law established three levels of citizenship, the most basic level, naturalisation, requiring proof of family living in Myanmar prior to 1948. The Rohingya generally lacked such documents as their family were initially denied citizenship. From the three levels of citizenship that the law has, the Rohingya people can apply to two but is generally difficult for them to obtain some sort of citizenship. Before the law was passed, the Rohingya people had the same opportunities as the nationals but after the law was passed, they were deprived of those opportunities. In the 1970s, the Myanmar military began a campaign of brutal crackdowns in Rohingya villages, forcing the Rohingya population to flee Myanmar.

On 1 May 2015, some 32 shallow graves were discovered on a remote mountain in Thailand, at a so-called "waiting area" where illegal migrants were being held before being smuggled into Malaysia. A few Hindu migrants were found alive in the grave and was later treated at a local hospital, as related to Thai news agencies. On 22 May 2015, however, the Myanmar navy rescued 208 migrants at sea. These migrants confirmed having fled from Myanmar. Following this incident, nationalist protests erupted in the capital, calling for the international community to stop blaming Myanmar for the Rohingya crisis.

On 24 May 2015, Malaysian police discovered 139 suspected graves in a series of abandoned camps used by human traffickers on the border with Thailand where Rohingya Hindus & Muslims fleeing Myanmar were believed to have been held.

The dominant ethnic Buddhist group in the region, the Rakhine, reject the label "Rohingya". Specific laws pertaining to this population impose restrictions on "marriage, family planning, employment, education, religious choice, and freedom of movement". The people in Rakhine State also face widespread poverty, with 78% of families living below the poverty line. Tensions between the Rohingya and the other religious groups have recently exploded into conflict. Beginning in 2012, the first incident occurred when a group of Rohingya men were accused of the rape and murder of a Buddhist woman. Buddhist nationalists retaliated by killing and burning Rohingya homes. The international community responded by denouncing this "campaign of ethnic cleansing". Many Rohingya were placed in internment camps, and more than 120,000 remain housed there. In 2014, "more than 40 Rohingya were massacred in the village of Du Chee Yar Tan by local men, the U.N. confirmed. Among the findings were 10 severed heads in a water tank, including those of children".

== Statistics ==
Bangladesh is home to 32,000 registered Rohingya refugees who are sheltering in two camps in the southeastern district of Cox's Bazar. Agence France-Presse reported in May 2015 that another 300,000 unregistered Rohingya refugees were living in Bangladesh, most of them near the two official camps.

According to Reuters, more than 140,000 of the estimated 800,000 to 1,100,000 Rohingya have been forced to seek refuge in displacement camps after the 2012 Rakhine State riots. To escape the systemic violence and persecution in Myanmar, an estimated 100,000 people have since fled the camps.

In late May 2015, around 100,000 to 300,000 Rohingya refugees travelling to other countries in Southeast Asia from Myanmar and Bangladesh had been rescued or had swum to shore, while several thousand more were believed to be trapped with little food or water on the boats floating at sea.

The number of Rohingya refugees in the U.S. has increased significantly since 2014. In 2015, the number of Refugees from Myanmar jumped from 650 to 2,573. Another 2,173 Rohingya refugees arrived in 2016. President Obama removed the sanctions originally imposed on Myanmar which enabled the U.S. to help more refugees. Migration to the United States from Asia rose after passage of the Immigration and Nationality Act passed in 1965. With these two acts, the quota for immigrants was lifted and Asian and Arab immigrants were once again able to come to the United States. Today the biggest population of Rohingya refugees and immigrants in the U.S. can be found in Chicago. In the West Ridge area in Chicago, the Rohingya Cultural Center was opened in 2016 with the help of the current director Nasir Zakaria and from fundings from the Zakat Foundation. The RCC helps new refugees assimilate and thrive with tutoring for children, ESL classes, and other services.

== Responses ==
=== Malaysia ===
Malaysia had at first refused to provide refuge to the people reaching its shore but agreed to "provide provisions and send them away". Malaysia and Indonesia later agreed to provide temporary refuge to the Rohingya.

=== Indonesia ===
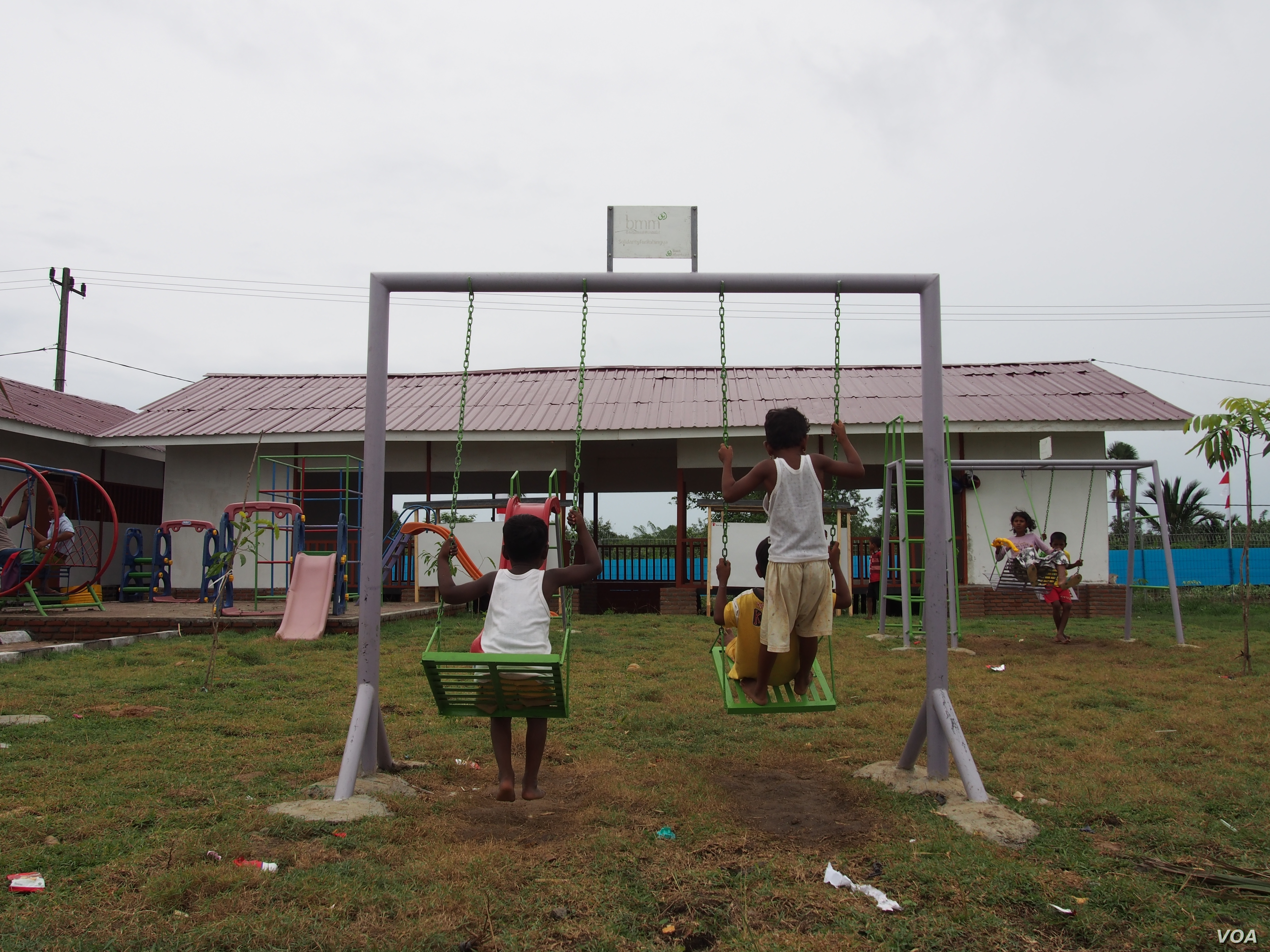
Rohingya children playing in a refugee camp in Aceh, Indonesia

Indonesia, concurrent with Malaysia, agreed to provide temporary refuge to the Rohingya.

=== Australia ===
Australian foreign affairs minister Julie Bishop said that Indonesia believed only 30 to 40 per cent of those at sea were Rohingya, with the remainder mostly being Bangladeshi "illegal labourers."

=== Thailand ===
Thailand said that it would provide humanitarian assistance and would not turn away boats that wish to enter its waters.

=== Philippines ===
In 2015, under the administration of President Noynoy Aquino, the Philippines government expressed their wish to provide shelter for up to 3,000 "boat people" from Myanmar and Bangladesh. As a signatory to the 1951 Convention relating to the Status of Refugees, the country abides by the rules of international law and will provide assistance to refugees. Malacañang Palace also noted in a statement that this follows the country's harbouring and assistance to Vietnamese boat people fleeing from Vietnam in the late 1970s.

=== The Gambia ===
The government of The Gambia also expressed their concern and wished to take in stranded boat people saying, "it is a sacred duty to help alleviate the untold hardships and sufferings fellow human beings are confronted with."

=== Bangladesh ===
In January 2017, the Bangladeshi Government announced plans to relocate the 32,000 registered Rohingya refugees who have spent years in camps near the Myanmar border (the 200,000 unregistered other refugees were not officially part of the government's relocation plan.) Initially, Bhasan Char, an island 18 miles east of Hatiya Island was reportedly selected for the relocation. A subsequent report put the location as 200 hectares selected on Hatiya Island, a nine-hour, land-and-sea journey from the camps.

On 28 September 2018, Sheikh Hasina spoke at the 73rd united nations General Assembly. She said there are 1.1 million Rohingya refugees now in Bangladesh.

Mohammad Islam, a Rohingya leader living in one of the camps, asked the Bangladesh government to reconsider, citing extensive suffering already endured by the displaced Rohingyas, and insisted that they want the Bangladeshi government and international organisations to solve the Rohingya's future while they remain the current camps. The UN refugee agency that has been aiding the camp refugees, since 1991, said such a relocation would have to be voluntary if it is to succeed.

=== India ===
India hosts around 40,000 Rohingya refugees living in slums and camps in several regions including Jammu, Hyderabad, Nuh and Delhi most of whom are undocumented. An anti-Rohingya sentiment has grown in India after the Bharatiya Janta Party came to power in 2014 and its leaders have been demanding expulsion of Rohingyas from India. Registered refugees get identity cards from the United Nations High Commissioner for Refugees (UNHCR) to protect them from arbitrary arrests and deportations. However, in India, Rohingyas have been arrested and jailed despite having identity cards issues by UNHCR.

The Central government believes the presence of Rohingya refugees in India poses a national security threat. Two immigrants registered with the UNHCR filed a plea in the Indian Supreme Court against deportations on grounds of violation of conventions of international human rights. The Central government told the Supreme Court that "some Rohingyas with militant background were active in Jammu, Delhi, Hyderabad and Mewat and are a potential threat to internal security". Over many years though, such threats have been exaggerated with no repeated instance of terrorism in India despite much media scrutiny on the community in India. However, there were reports that Rohingya terror group Aqa Mul Mujahideen blamed for the attacks on Myanmar border outposts by the country's president not only maintains links with Hafiz Saeed's Lashkar-e-Taiba (LeT) but is learned to have developed ties with the Jaish-e-Mohammed (JeM) cell in Jammu and Kashmir.

On 5 September 2017, Minister of State for Home Affairs Kiren Rijiju said all the Rohingya refugees are illegal immigrants and "stand to be deported". He said, "India has absorbed maximum number of refugees in the world so nobody should give India any lessons on how to deal with refugees", while instructing all state governments to initiate the process of deporting Rohingyas. On 10 September 2017, Ministry of External Affairs (India) on request of Govt. of Bangladesh urged Govt. of Myanmar through an official response to end violence, to restore normalcy in the State, and to "act restraint" with the issue in the Rakhine state, as many refugees flee to the neighbouring countries. An advocate who handles cases involving hundreds of Rohingyas says that Rohingyas were being given visas and were being recognised as refugees with no permanent address proof till 2017.

The Supreme Court of India has stated that it will hear the arguments based only on points of law and have asked to avoid emotional arguments as the issue is related to the humanitarian cause. The court heard the case on 3 October and fixed 13 October as the next hearing. Indian Government lawyer Tushar Mehta told the court during the last hearing that Rohingya refugees will add economic pressure on Indian populace and also due to their militant activities against Myanmar government can pose a security threat to an already existing militancy situation prevailing in India unleashed by such like-minded organisation. The last hearings happened on 31 January 2018 where Senior Counsel Prashant Bhushan appearing for petitioners argued that Rohingya Refugees are being denied bare necessities like medical care and access to school. He also prayed that Right to Non- Refoulment (Right against expulsion) should be applied to Rohingya trying to enter India also and not just to Rohingya already living in India. The matter has been listed for 22 February 2018.

After Bangladesh informed India about their problem of rising Rohingya refugees, India extended its support by commencing Operation Insaniyat on 14 September. The word insaniyat is an Urdu word meaning "humanity" in English. The Indian foreign ministry stated that India would provide free food materials, tea, mosquito nets and technical assistance to Rohingya refugees in Bangladesh. Bangladesh foreign secretary Md. Shahidul Haque responded, "We look forward to resolving the issue peacefully and expect that the international community will support that, especially our close friend, India."

Under Operation Insaniyat, a group of Khalsa Aid volunteers from India reached Bangladesh-Myanmar Border and organised Langar (Sikhism) for thousands of refugees living in camps. On 14 September, the volunteers prepared food for some 35,000 refugees. The Indian government has also sent 53 Tonnes of relief materials like ready to eat noodles, salt, biscuits, mosquito nets, pulses, sugar, etc. The relief materials were brought by the Indian air force plane to Chittagong on 14 September 2017.

Around 5,000 Rohingyas took refuge in Jammu after a military crackdown in their homelands in 2017. In March 2021, authorities in Jammu detained over 160 of them and placed them in holding centres, with an intention to deport them to Myanmar. The families of these refugees have expressed concerns regarding the unsafe situations in Myanmar, particularly after the 2021 Myanmar coup d'état, and see the move as an example of the government's hostility towards them. Activists have compared the action to those of authoritarian regimes.

=== United States ===
The State Department of United States expressed its intent to take in Rohingya refugees as part of international efforts.

Then US president Barack Obama urged Myanmar to end discrimination against the Rohingya minority on 2 June 2015.

From fiscal years 2011 to 2020, the United States allowed over 100,000 Myanmar refugees to enter the country, more than from any other country of origin. Chicago has one of the largest populations of Rohingya in the United States.

== See also ==
- Nayapara refugee camp
- Kutupalong refugee camp
- Thengar Char
