= Princess Thonbanhla =

Burmese deity

- Princess of Taungnyo Kingdom
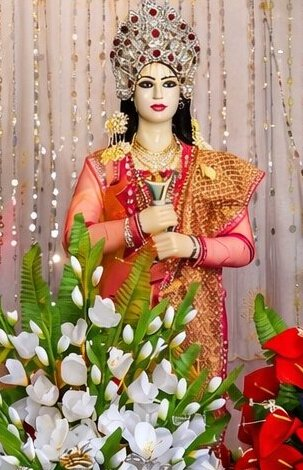
- Statue of Princess Thonbanhla in her shrine at Hmawza.
- Born: Taungnyo (near present-day Nattalin) or Hanthawaddy
- Died: Near Let-the Yay-Kan ("Claw Lake") or outside the walls of Sri Ksetra
- Burial: Let-the Yay-Kan ("Claw Lake")
- Religion: Buddhism

Princess Thonbanhla (Burmese: သုံးပန်လှ မင်းသမီး; lit. 'beautiful in three ways' or 'Three Times Beautiful') is a Burmese nat (deity). According to tradition, she was either Shin Saw Phyu Hteikhta, the younger sister of the ruler of Taungnyo, or a commoner from a small village. Renowned for her beauty, she was sent as a queen-designate to King Duttabaung of Sri Ksetra. Following her rejection by the king, she is said to have died of sorrow and shame.

Her story is often conflated with that of Thonbanhla, a member of the official pantheon of 37 nats. As the two figures share the same name, oral traditions occasionally merge them; the biography of the nat Thonbanhla sometimes mistakenly incorporates the narrative of Princess Thonbanhla.

== Depictions ==
According to one account, Princess Thonbanhla was a native of Kansun Nyaung, a Mon village in Hanthawaddy. She was described as possessing a distinctive beauty said to manifest in three different forms over the course of a single day, corresponding to morning, noon, and evening. Reports of her appearance reached King Duttabaung of Sri Ksetra (present-day Pyay), who summoned her to the court. However, her arrival at the palace sparked immediate jealousy among the king's existing wives and concubines. Court women conspired to prevent her from meeting the king by bribing royal messengers and spreading claims that her beauty was a deception, portraying her instead as a giantess or ogress unable to enter the city gates and who lived in a hut outside the city, sustaining herself through weaving. Tradition further holds that she later constructed the Koe Gyi Hlote Pagoda using wealth derived from her weaving. King Duttabaung never intended to take her into the royal household, and tradition holds she died of sorrow and became a nat (deity).

An alternative tradition identifies the princess as Shin Saw Phyu Hteikhta, the younger sister of the ruler of Taungnyo, a small neighboring polity of Sri Ksetra located near present-day Nattalin in the Bago Region. In this account, she was sent to Sri Ksetra as tribute to King Duttabaung and was intended to serve as a royal consort in order to strengthen diplomatic ties between the two states. However, the king's existing consorts, envious of her beauty, conspired to have her cast out by accusing her of witchcraft. According to this account, the king accepted the accusations, as he was infatuated with Queen Panhtwar, the female ruler of Beikthano, and had little interest in Princess Thonbanhla. The princess was subsequently exiled and is said to have become preoccupied with concerns about her appearance during her journey. Tradition holds that she clawed into the mud to create a pool of water in order to view her reflection. The lake that formed at the site is known as Let-the Yay-Kan ("Claw Lake") and is said to remain visible today.

After uncovering the palace deception and ordering the execution of the consorts who had slandered her, King Duttabaung set out in search of Princess Thonbanhla. Upon arriving, however, he found that she had already died, reportedly from exhaustion and grief. The king is said to have buried her near the lake and established a nearby village to maintain her tomb, appointing four of his generals to guard the site. Her burial place later became the village of Ko Gyi Myoke (Burmese: ကိုယ်ကြီးမြှုပ်; lit. 'where the body is buried'). Tradition further holds that the princess's spirit subsequently appeared to the king in a dream, prompting him to establish a shrine in her honor and grant the surrounding villages to her as her apaing-za (territorial possession). In local belief, individuals who engage in engage in backbiting, slander, or gossiping may incur her curse, which is said to manifest as leprosy or other severe skin diseases. Conversely, she is regarded as a protector of the harvest and weather for those considered righteous and devout. During worship ceremonies, devotees customarily offer three types of scarves, along with coconuts, bananas, and various snacks.

=== Conflated accounts ===
Her story is often conflated with that of Thonbanhla, the sister of the blacksmith Maung Tint De, known as the Mahagiri nat, as the two figures share the same name and are occasionally merged in oral traditions. While distinct from the Thonbanhla, who is one of the official 37 nats in the Burmese pantheon, Princess Thonbanhla is sometimes mistakenly listed as one of the official 37 nats due to this confusion.

Another account identifies Princess Thonbanhla as the sister-in-law of Ma Aung Phyu. In this local tradition, she is regarded as a "spinster spirit," or maiden spirit, characterized by an aversion to themes of domestic life. It is believed that she disapproves when visitors or devotees discuss marriage, weddings, or family matters in her presence.

== Legacy ==
The princess's legacy is commemorated in Ko Gyi Myoke village, where a dedicated nat shrine and a statue of the princess are located. A loom attributed to her lifetime is also preserved there. Her principal annual worship ceremony is held on the eve of the full moon of Waso in her honor. She is referred to as pindaingsan (ပင်တိုင်စံ), or Princess of Taungnyo.

The Thonbanhla Monastery, a historic brick structure in Hmawza, is named after the princess. It is situated near Let-the Yay-Kan, which local tradition identifies as her burial site.

== Tomb excavation ==
In January 2019, the Department of Archaeology and National Museum in Myanmar announced plans to systematically re-excavate the burial site attributed to Princess Thonbanhla. The department stated that a previous excavation conducted in 1998 under the direction of Man Win Khine Than had been unsuccessful and was subsequently suspended.
