= Thonbanhla Monastery =

Buddhist monastery in Pyay, Myanmar

Coordinates: 18°47′12.9″N 95°18′57.9″E

Thonbanhla Monastery (သုံးပန်လှကျောင်း; also spelt Thonpanhla Monastery) is a historical Buddhist brick monastery located in Hmaw Zar Village, Pyay, Myanmar. The monastery is believed to have been built around the 16th century, during the late Ava period.

Historical records indicate that this monastery served as the residence of Shin Raṭṭhasāra, one of the most celebrated poets of the Ava Kingdom. However, some historians disagree with the late Ava period construction theory and believe that the monastery was actually built during the Konbaung period. The monastery is named Thonbanhla because it is located near Latheesaekkan (Claw Lake), a lake within its grounds believed to be the burial site of Princess Thonbanhla, the consort-designate of King Duttabaung of Sri Ksetra.

According to the abbot of the monastery, it was constructed in 1915, and its donors were a mother and daughter from Upper Myanmar (Anyar). The builders incorporated a blend of Chinese and Indian architectural styles and decorative elements.

The monastery was badly damaged with most of the structure collapsing during the 2025 Myanmar earthquake. The government began the restoration of the temple in June 2025.
