= Sri Ksetra Archaeological Museum =

- သီရိခေတ္တရာပြတိုက်
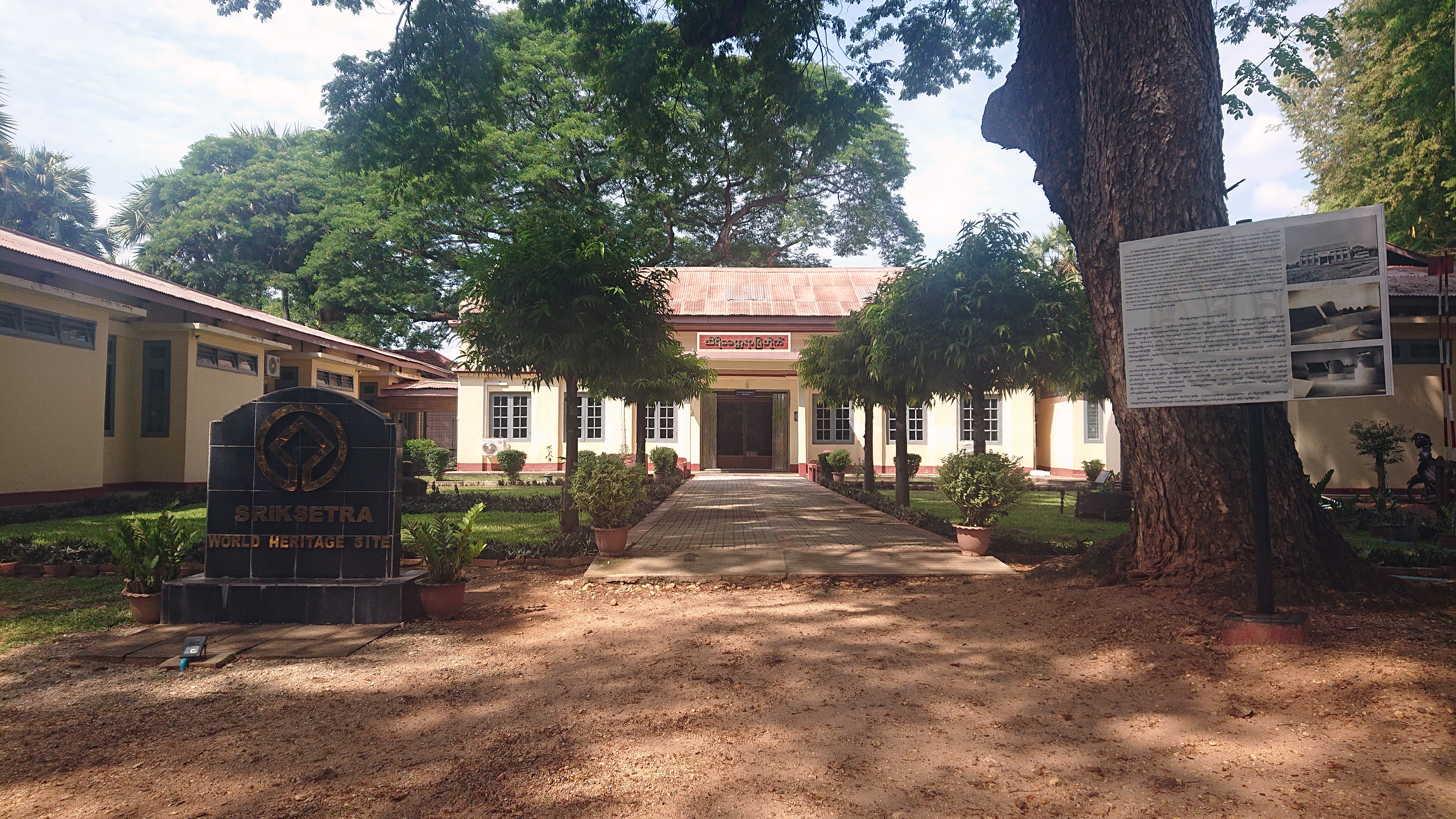
- Established: 1961; 65 years ago
- Location: Sri Ksetra, Hmawza, Pyay, Bago Region, Myanmar
- Coordinates: 18°48′34.300″N 95°17′17.903″E
- Type: Archaeological museum
- Collection size: Approx. 265 artifacts on display; 5,998 total objects

Sri Ksetra Archaeological Museum is a historical museum located near the ancient Pyu city-state of Sri Ksetra in Hmawza village, about 8 kilometres (5.0 mi) from Pyay in Bago Region, Myanmar. It displays archaeological objects recovered from the Sri Ksetra site, an ancient centre of the Pyu city-states, which was designated a World Heritage Site by UNESCO in 2014 as part of the "Pyu Ancient Cities" group.

== History ==
The current museum building was built in 1960 and 1961, and opened in 1962. The collection of antiquities from Sri Ksetra began in the early 20th century. The Epigraphy Department conducted surveys in the area and stored archaeological objects in a small building known as the Thayet Taw Museum, established near the ancient palace site between 1907 and 1910. After the building was destroyed by fire in 1915, the Kyaukka Thein Museum was constructed as the first museum at Sri Ksetra.

== Collection ==
The museum preserves and displays a collection of ancient artifacts from the Pyu period. The exhibits include stone burial urns, reliquary cover stones, stone reliefs of Lokanatha and Tara Devi, bronze figures of Pyu dancers, Pyu beads, sandstone sculptures of the deities Vishnu and Lakshmi, iron objects, stone Buddha images with Pyu inscriptions, terracotta plaques, coins, and roof tiles. The collection provides materials for the study of the religion, culture, and society of the ancient Pyu people.

The museum consistently displays around 265 cultural artifacts, though its total collection encompasses a much larger number, with 5,998 objects recorded as of recent inventories. The majority of the artifacts date to the country's Pyu period of the first millennium CE. The collection provides a comprehensive insight into the art, culture, and daily life of the ancient Pyu people.
