= Panhtwar =

Pan Htwar
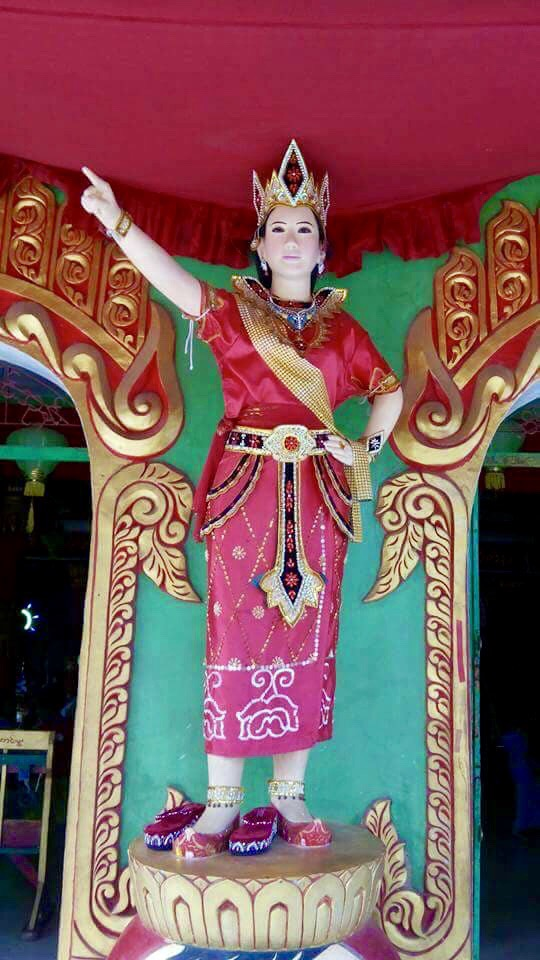
- Queen Pan Htwar statue

Queen regnant of Beikthano
- Reign: c. 200 BCE - 300 CE
- Predecessor: new founded
- Successor: Duttabaung (as victory)

Queen consort of Sri Ksetra
- Predecessor: herself
- Consort: Duttabaung
- House: Beikthano; Sri Ksetra (by marriage)
- Father: Sula Thamawa
- Mother: Sanda Muhki
- Religion: Theravada Buddhism

Panhtwar (Burmese: ပန်ထွာ) was the legendary queen regnant of Beikthano, the ancient city of the Pyu Kingdom. She was considered to be a strong, spiritual lady of war and fame. Queen Panhtwar became a heroine figure in Burmese culture, and stories of her are commonly told to small children.

== Legend ==
According to legend, Panhtwar was the only daughter of Sula Thambawa, a son of Maha Thado Yarzar, the legendary King of Tagaung Kingdom, and Sanda Muhki, a rakshasi woman from Lanka Dipa. Her story recounts the wartime period between Sri Ksetra and Beikthano and the battles that unfolded. Beikthano is a small kingdom ruled by Queen Panhtwar. The kingdom was created for Panhtwar by the deity 'Beikthano'(Vishnu) as a blessing because she was assumed to be the younger sister of Vishnu in a previous life. The other kingdoms, being larger and stronger, sought to conquer hers. Despite their repeated attempts and numerical and equipment advantages, they never succeeded in overtaking her kingdom. The queen successfully repelled all her enemy forces with the assistance of a magical drum named "Atula Sidaw" (အတုလစည်တော်, lit. 'Nonpareil Drum'), given to her by Indra, the king of the gods. When the queen struck the drum, its magical resonance caused the waters of the Yan Pe River (lit. Foe-Removing River) to rise rapidly, flooding the surrounding plain. This prevented any attacking army from crossing it. One day, Duttabaung (ဒွတ္တဘောင်, the King of Sri Ksetra), had some of his subjects disguise themselves as rishis and sent them to Beikthano. After the false rishis gained trust and worship from Queen Panhtwar, she allowed them to stay in the palace. Subsequently, they sabotaged the drums, rendering the alarm inoperable. The next day, when soldiers attacked, the drum did not work when she hit it. Consequently, she lost her kingdom, and the king took her as his wife, claiming the entire kingdom for himself.

Indeed, Duttabaung was the son of Maha Thamawa, the twin brother of Sula Thamawa. Consequently, Duttabaung was a cousin of Panhtwar. The king's other consorts, fueled by jealousy of her beauty, conspired against her. They convinced Duttabaung that her loveliness was a mere magic trick and falsely claimed that Panhtwar, in reality, was a horrible ogre. Unfortunately, the king believed their deceit and abandoned her. Despite this, she still desired to reclaim her kingdom, but unable to assume the role of the queen in this unfamiliar realm. So, she remained unhappy. Consequently, every day, she sought to diminish the king's power in various ways as much as possible.

Therefore, one day, Panhtwar presented Duttabaung with a seemingly innocuous face-cloth. However, it was not what it appeared, for it was the lower end of her htamein. As soon as the king used it, his power and glory vanished. This was her act of vengeance. On another occasion, while traveling by royal barge, Duttabaung encountered a dragon lurking beneath the surface of the water. Deprived of his magic and weakened by Panhtwar's earlier deception, he was unable to defend himself against the beast and was ultimately devoured. Thus, Panhtwar achieved her revenge, albeit at a great cost. However, her actions against the king, witnessed by his other wives, were deemed so egregious and disrespectful that they could not forgive her. Subjected to relentless harassment and ostracization, Panhtwar, unable to bear the torment, tragically took her own life by consuming poison.

In an alternate version of the legend, Duttabaung was smitten with love for Panhtwar and attempted to marry her. Panhtwar refused Duttabaung because the previous king of Sri Ksetra, Sula Thanbawa had abandoned Panhtwar and her mother to take the Nāga princess Bedari as his queen upon ascending the throne. When she refused, Duttabaung waged war and burnt down Beikthano, captured her and made her his queen. Panhtwar's deceit was, in this version, revenge to take him down. However, she allegedly did so in secret plotting with other concubines and it is unknown if she was merely the scapegoat as Duttabaung did not accuse her after using the face-cloth.

In an alternate version of the legend, Panhtwar was a resilient queen whose kingdom was unjustly seized by the King of Sri Ksetra, who manipulated her trust by posing as a monk. He forcefully took her as his wife, and while some claim he loved her deeply, she did not reciprocate due to the harm he had caused her. In retaliation, she vowed revenge and cursed a piece of cloth (though some erroneously label it her htamein or cloth for her genitals). After presenting the cursed cloth to the king, causing him to lose his magic mole, a main source of his power and abilities, he soon faced myriad rebellions and had to flee the capital. However, the magic mole was later unexpectedly restored with the help of a natural shampoo called tayaw kinpun. Enraged, the king and his court ordered the killing of Panhtwar, who, before taking her own life, cursed the land never to grow. The traditional verse of this curse is "ငါလာမှကြီး၊ ငါလာမှသိီး" ("May these plants grow and bear fruit only if I return here"). The area where she died has corypha plants (ပေပင်) that can barely grow over a meter to date.

== Historicity ==
The Hmannan Yazawin, the main 19th century royal historical chronicle, merely describes the war with Panhtwar as steming from Beikthano's refusable to pay taxes to Duttabaung and that Duttabaung was tricked on account of Panhtwar being a devotee of Vishnu.

The legend framing Panhtwar as a beautiful queen was first recorded in the 19th century from local oral history in Taungdwingyi. Colonial historians of the Pyu had dismissed this alternate story for being an unsourced story first written recently. Historians during the Konbaung dynasty prior to the Hmannan Yazawin chornicle further claimed that Panhtwar was the queen of a Kyi Kingdom rather than Beikthano. According to the Konbaung administrative documents, Panhtwar was listed as a middle queen (မိဘုရား, wife of the king) rather than a queen regnant (ဘုရင်မ, female ruler). Archaeological evidence also points to an earthquake destroying Beikthano around the 2nd century AD and a war around the 3rd and 4th century AD. It is possible from these records that the founding queen of Beikthano is misidentified with a later noble daughter given to Duttabaung as a wife. The beauftiful Panhtwar may be a noblewomen from the second rebuilding of Beikthano around the 2nd century who then faced a war from Sri Ksetra.

Archaeological excavations also show a mixture of Buddhism and Brahmanism at both Sri Ksetra and Beikthano. The legend of the war between the two states, may be symoblising the struggle between Shaivism and Vaishnavism. According to colonial administrator J.G. Scott, Panhtwar's magic drum and Duttbaung's mole are allusions to Shiva and Vishnu's symbols. Archaeologist Ramakrishna Rao identifies the destruction of Duttabaung's mole and Panhtwar's drum as symbolic of the conversion of the Pyu realm from following Hinduism towards Buddhism.

== Spiritual life and worship ==
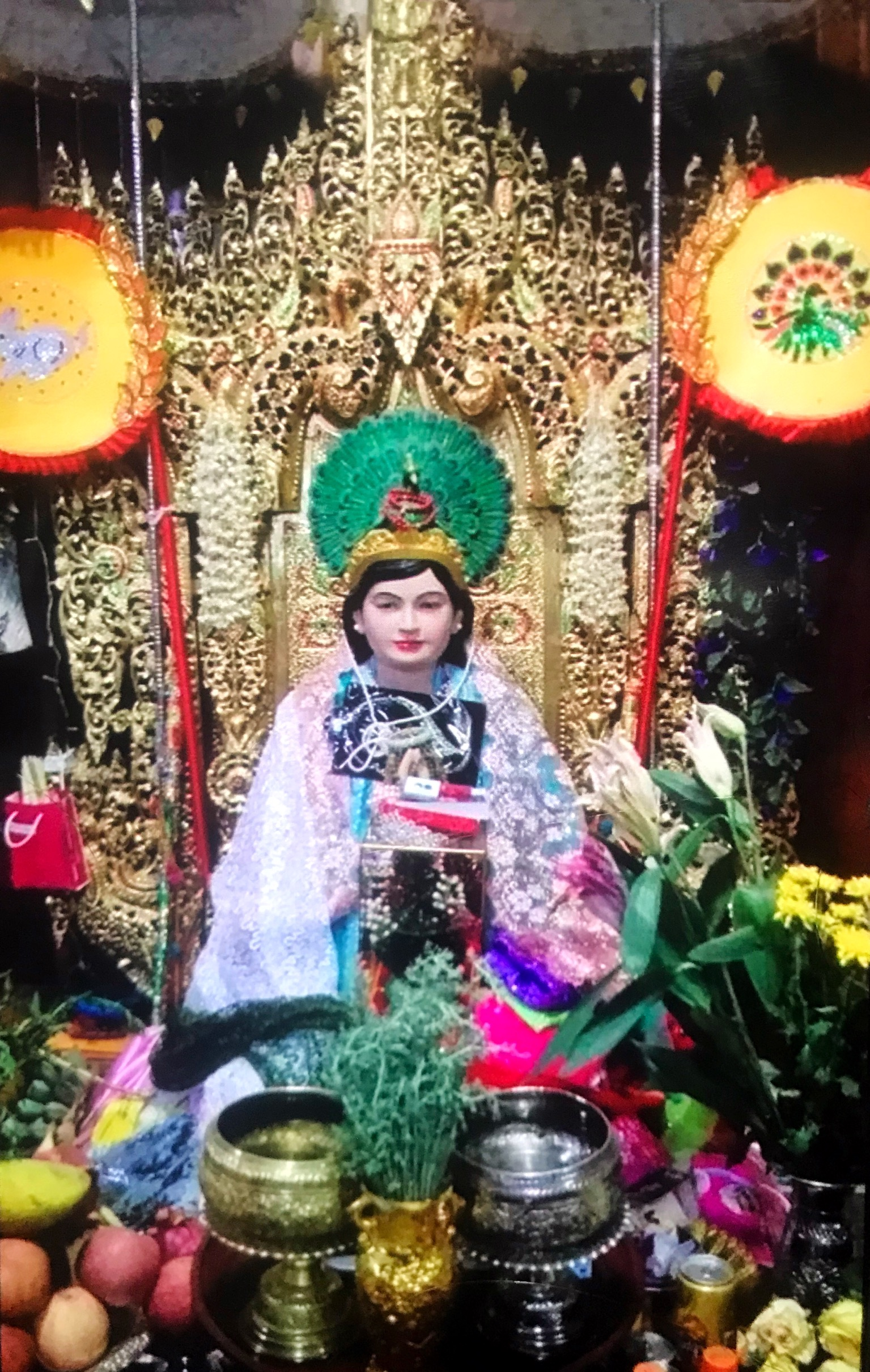

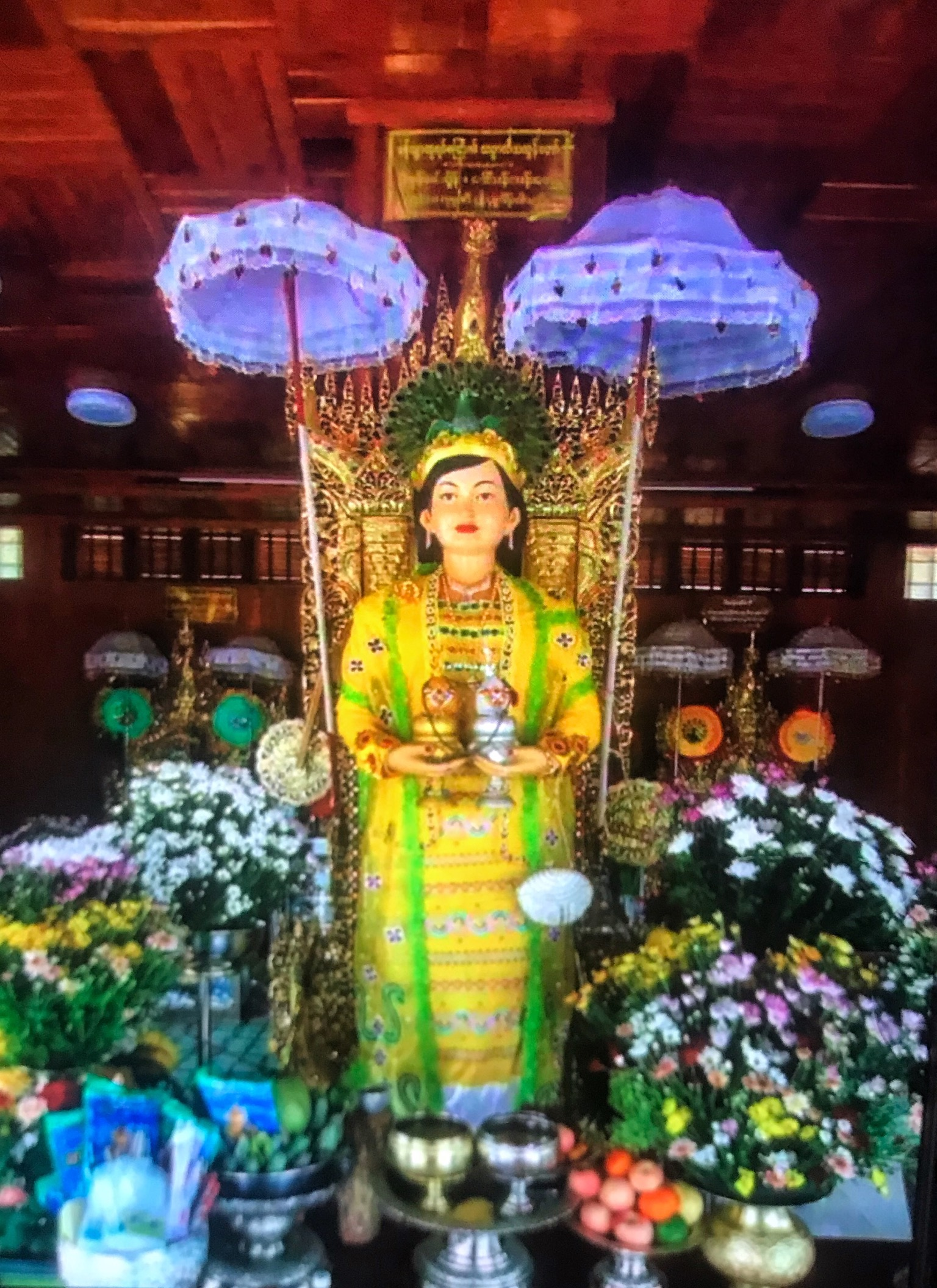

After her death, her story continued to be passed down from one generation to another by the people. Some believe that her love for the kingdom was so profound that after she died she transformed into a goddess, overseeing and caring for the citizens with her spiritual powers. She is also revered as the goddess of the deep forest, known as Mahar Myaing.

In the old city of Beikthano, the talipot palms, despite their age of thousands of years, stubbornly refuse to exceed a meter in height and bear no fruit. According to local belief, the stunted growth is attributed to Queen Panthwar's curse, indicating that she did not undergo reincarnation. Legend has it that she cursed the kingdom, declaring, "Let them grow and bear fruit when I come back" (ငါလာမှကြီး ငါလာမှသီး).

The garden in the old city of Beikthano initially lacked sal trees, but sal tree flowers spontaneously appeared on the garden's ground, leading to the garden being named Ingyin Garden (sal tree garden). At the Shweyaungdaw Pagoda, donated by Queen Panhtwar, sal tree flowers are consistently offered to the pagoda by an unknown source. These flowers can also be found scattered around the pagoda square. It is believed that the flowers come by the order of the god Vishnu.

== In popular culture ==
Her story is widely portrayed in Burmese theaters and other forms of art. She is the subject of several Burmese films.

Miss Universe Myanmar 2014 Sharr Htut Eaindra wore a dress inspired by Queen Panhtwar as a national costume at the Miss Universe 2014 event.
