= Beikthano =

- City
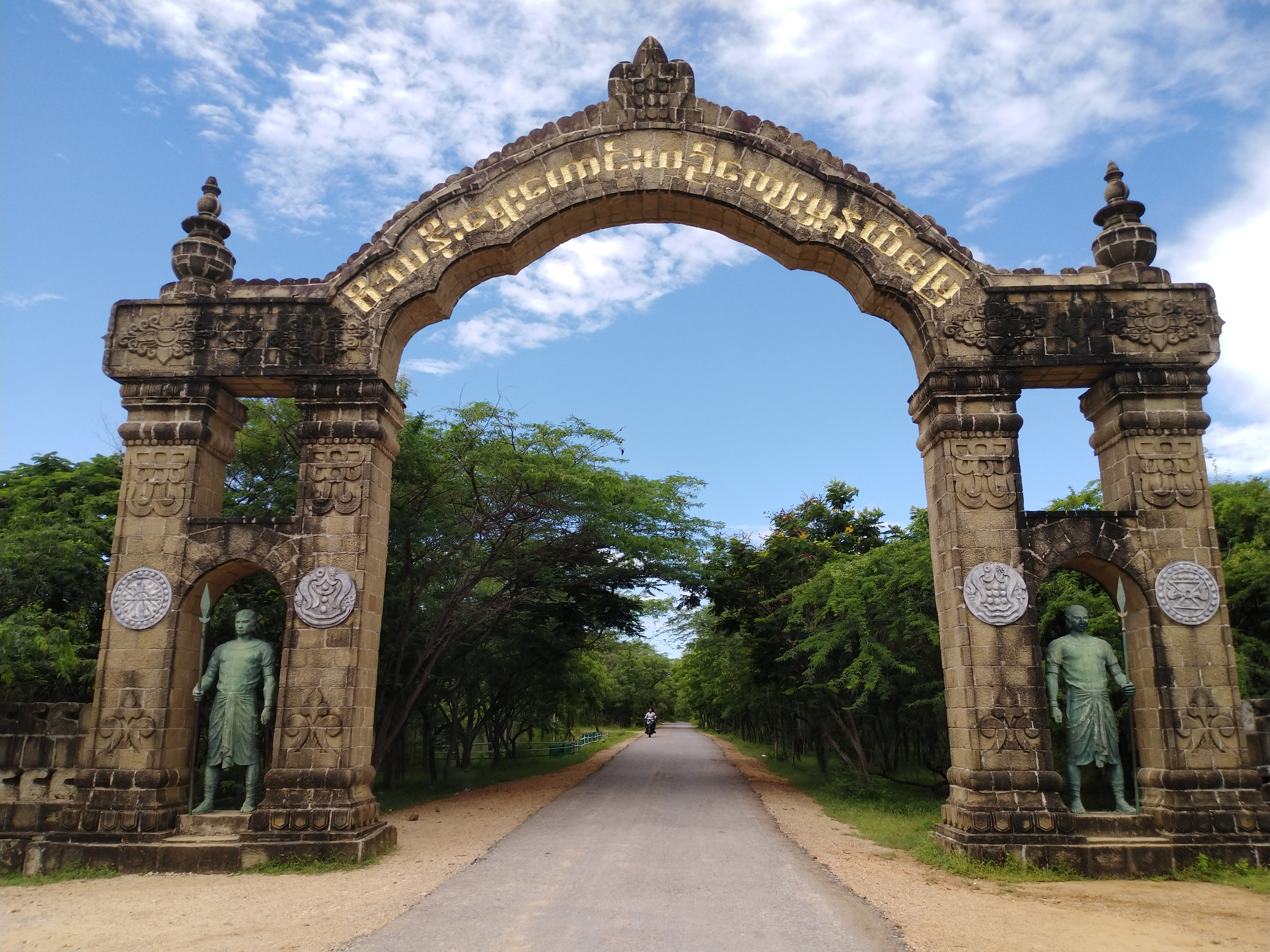
- Gate of Beikthano Historical Sites

- Location in Burma
- Coordinates: 20°0′14″N 95°22′46″E
- Country: Burma
- Region: Magway Region
- District: Magway District
- Township: Beikthano
- Time zone: UTC+6.30 (MST)

Beikthano (Burmese: ဗိဿနိုး, [beɪʔθənó], also known as Panhtwa city), is situated in the irrigated Magway Region, near present-day Taungdwingyi. In the era of the Pyu city-states it was a city of considerable significance, possibly a local capital replacing Sri Ksetra. Today the modest village is noted for its hot springs and archaeological sites. Beikthano, Hanlin, and Sri Ksetra, the ancient cities of the Pyu Kingdom were built on the irrigated fields of the dry zone of the Ayeyawady River basin. They were inscribed by UNESCO on its List of World Heritage Sites in Southeast Asia in May 2014 for their archaeological heritage traced back more than 1,000 years to between 200 BC and 900 AD.

Beikthano, with direct land access to the well-watered Kyaukse plains to its northeast, is the oldest urban site so far discovered and scientifically excavated site. Its remains—the structures, pottery, artefacts, and human skeletons—date from 200 BCE to 100 CE. Named after the Hindu god Vishnu, the city may be the first capital of a culturally and perhaps even politically uniform state in the history of Burma. It was a large fortified settlement, measuring approximately 300 hectares inside the rectangular (3 km by 1 km) walls. The walls and fortifications along it measured six meters thick, and are radiocarbon dated to a period between 180 BCE and 610 CE. Like most subsequent cities, the main entrance of the walls led to the palace, which faced east. Stupas and monastic buildings have also been excavated within the city walls.

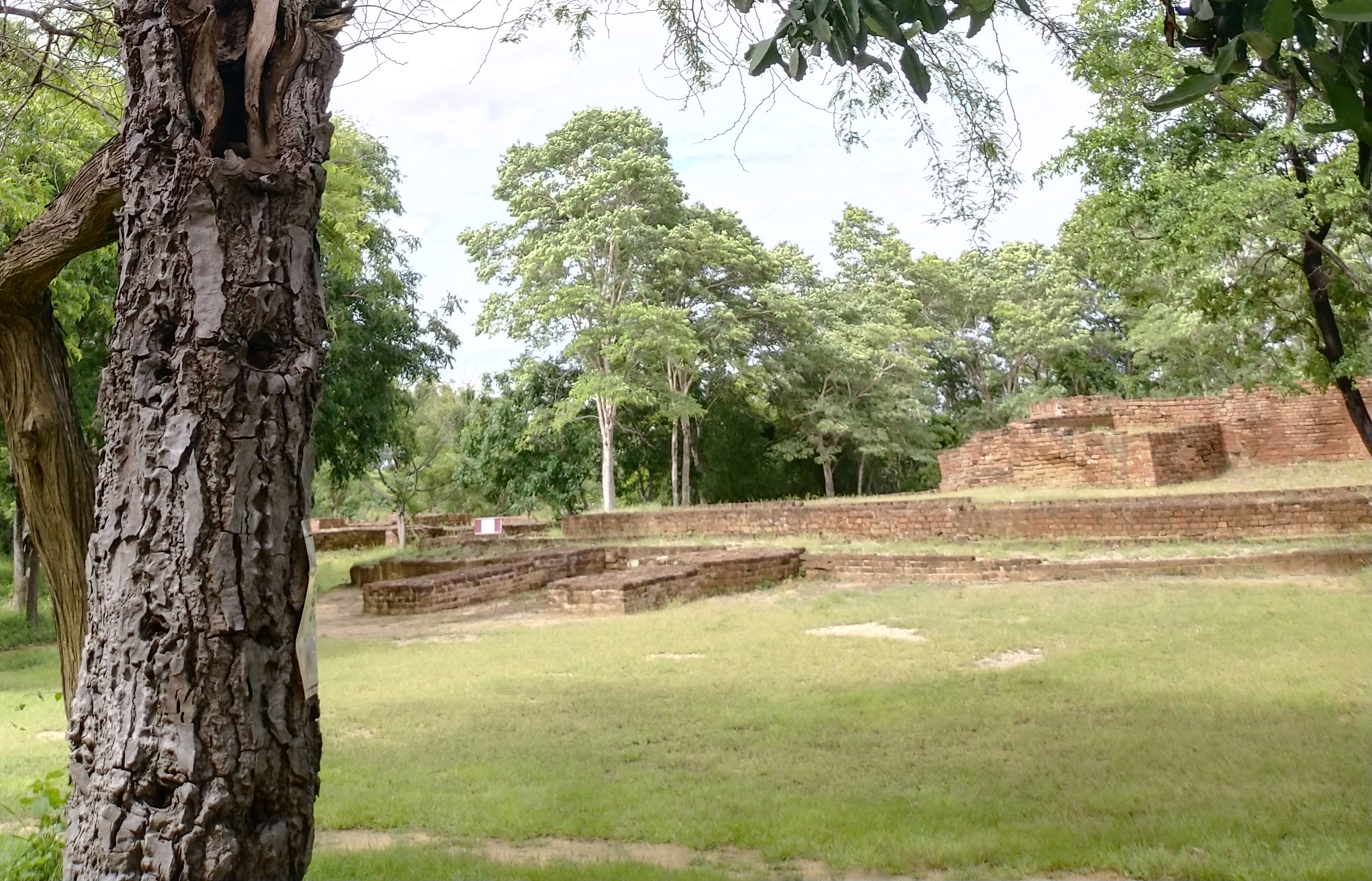
An ancient ruin in Beikthano Pyu City

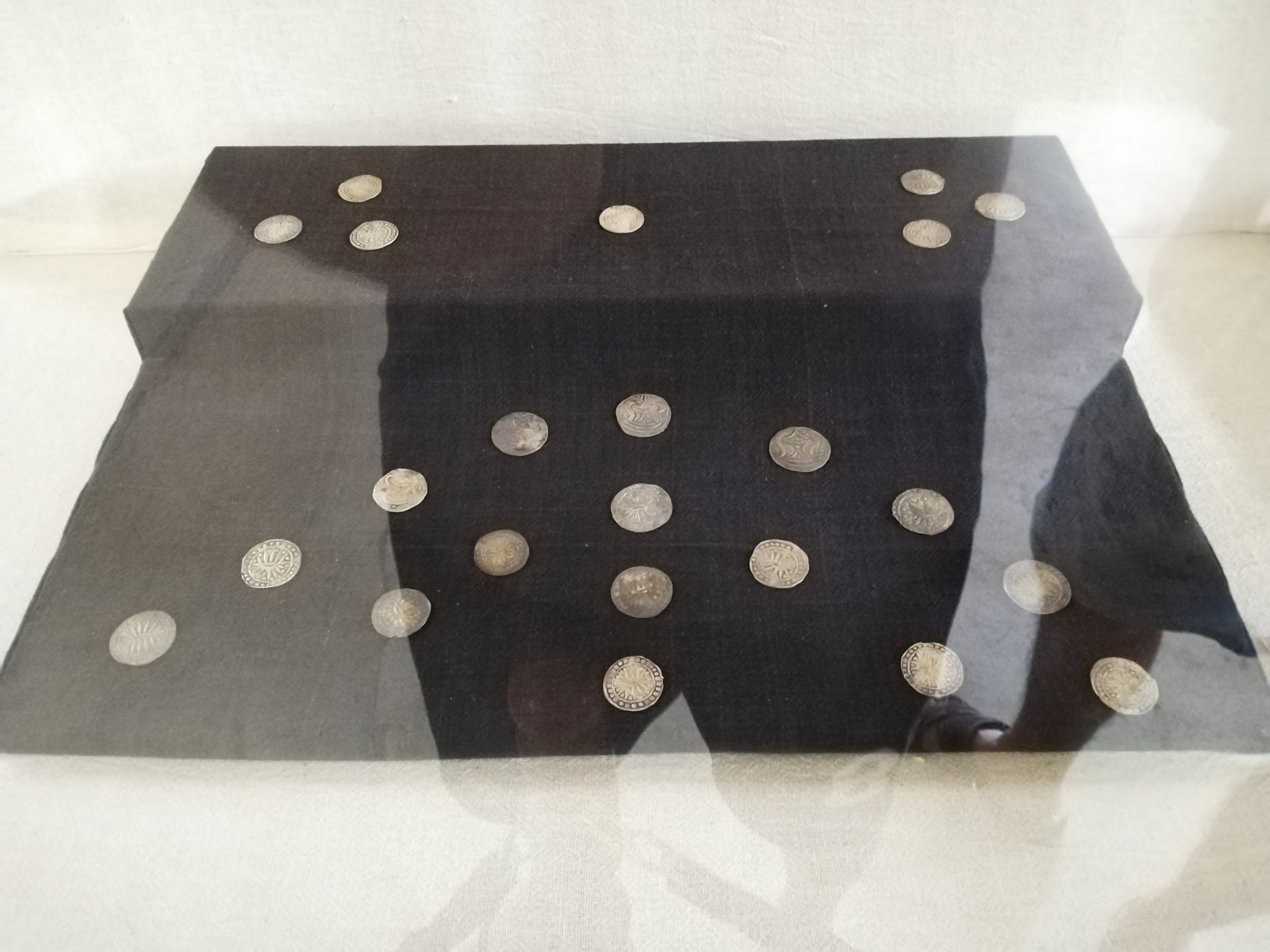
Pyu silver coins displaying in the musium of Beikthano

== Name ==
The name "Beikthano Myo" is the Burmese language rendering of "Vishnu City". According to Michael Aung-Thwin, this name does not seem to be attested in historical chronicles, and it is only applied to the ancient site retroactively by modern scholars.

== Location ==
Beikthano is located 12 miles west of Taungdwingyi Township. Magway Region on the Taungdwingyi-Magway Highway. Its co-ordinates are latitude (20°) North and (95° / 23’) East and is built on ground 450 feet above sea level. The ancient city of Beikthano covered an area of 3.3 square miles. The eastern city wall was 10,000 feet in length. The northern wall was 9,000 feet. The southern wall was 8,000 feet, while the western wall has collapsed owing to soil erosion caused by the action of the Yanpè Creek. Beikthano was defended by two walls, a city wall and an inner palace wall.

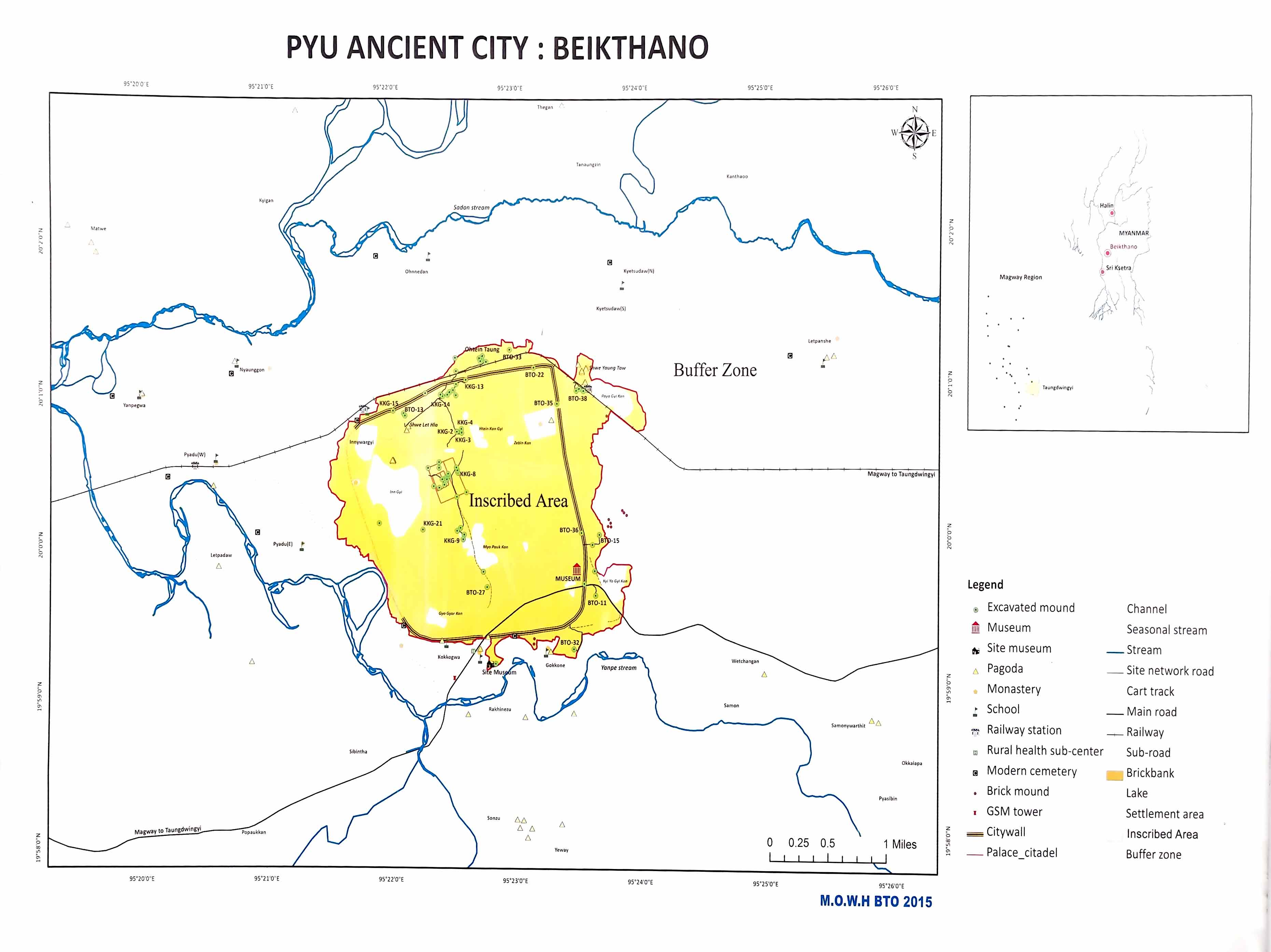
Maps of Beikthano Historical Sites

== History ==
Beikthano is traditionally believed to have been founded some 2,400 years ago by Princess Pan Htwar descended from a still legendary dynasty of Tagaung in Upper Myanmar. The fall of the city is attributed to a mightier king, Duttabaung of Sri Ksetra, who sacked the city, subdued the princess, took her captive and eventually married her. In the present stage of historical research in this country the personalities characterized in the legend are beyond authentic identification. However, the existence of an ancient city called Beikthano (Vishnu City) is testified by the ruins which stand to this day and indicates that the legend may have sprung up from a nucleus of true facts.

Archaeological evidence also points to an earthquake destroying Beikthano around the 2nd century AD and a war around the 3rd and 4th century AD. It 18th century Hmannan Yazawin royal chronicle describes a war between Sri Ksetra and Beikthano which may correspond to this 4th century war. Although Beikthano is geographically a Pyu city state, there is a lack of archaeological evidence to conclusively determine that its inhabitants were Pyu.

== UNESCO inscription ==
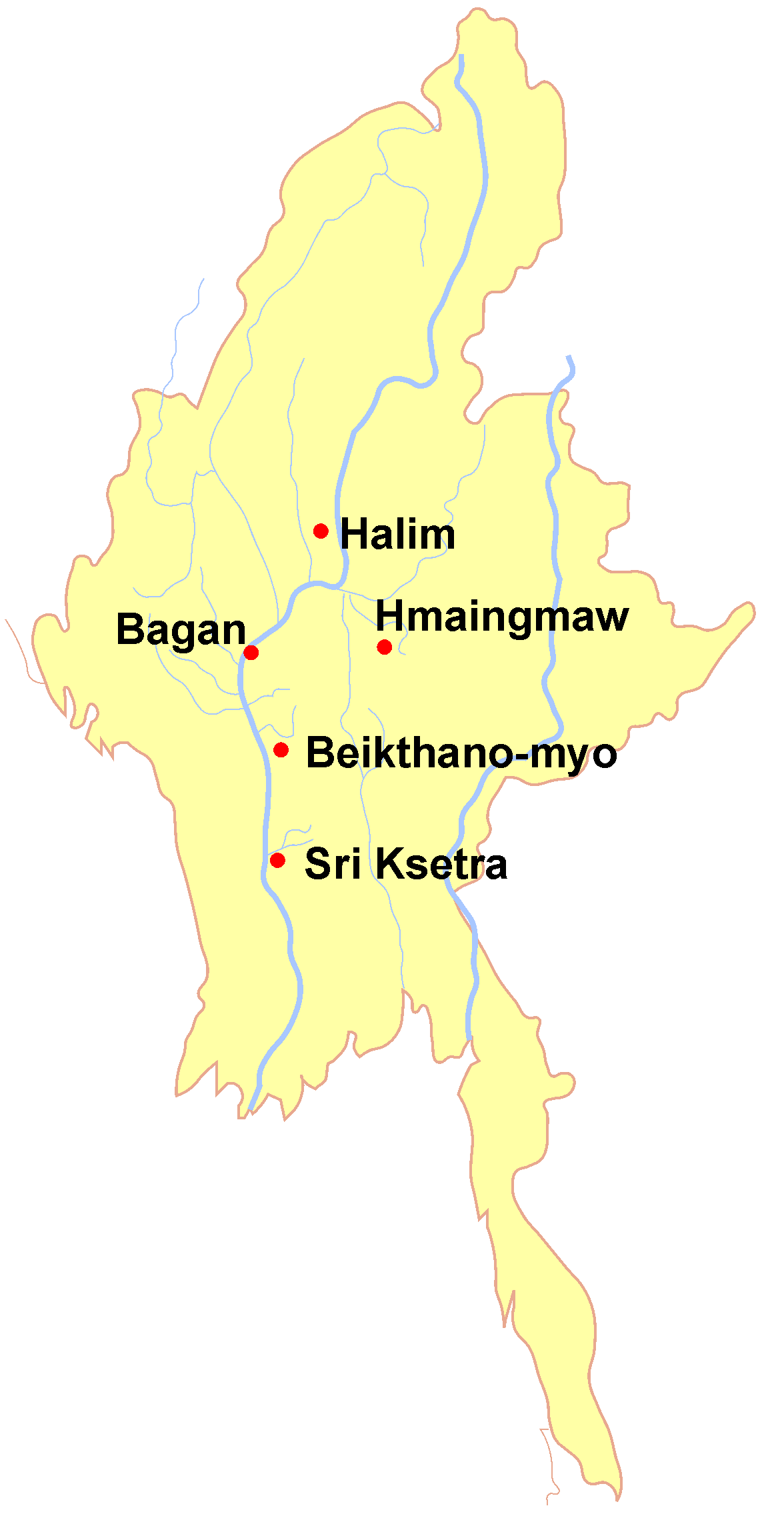
Map of the most important Pyu city-states

In October 1996, Beikthano, Hanlin and Sri Ksetra were proposed to be inscribed on the UNESCO World Heritage List. This proposal was approved by UNESCO in the 38th session of the World Heritage Committee held in May 2014 in Doha, Qatar. According to the UNESCO report, the Pyu Kingdom prospered for over 1,000 years between 200 BC and 900 AD. All three sites are inscribed under Criterion (ii), (iii), and (iv) covering an area of 5,809 hectares (14,350 acres) with a buffer zone of 6,790 hectares (16,800 acres). The integrity assessment by UNESCO of the three sites is: "The completeness and reliability of dated archaeological sequences from the site, with the radiocarbon dates derived from intact architectural features dating back to 190 BCE, provide scientific proof of the entire one-thousand year period of occupation of the cities, and reinforces palaeographic dates provided by inscriptions in Pyu script on artifacts excavated at the site"
