= Duttabaung =

Legendary king of Sri Ksetra Kingdom

- King of Sri Ksetra Kingdom
- Reign: 443 BCE – 374 BCE
- Coronation: 442 BCE
- Predecessor: Sula Thanbawa
- Successor: Duttayan (Yanbaung Min)
- Born: c. 480 BCE; Sri Ksetra
- Died: 373
- Spouse: Sanda Devi; Besandi
- Issue: Duttayan
- House: Duttabaung / Wikrama
- Religion: Buddhism

Duttabaung (Burmese: ဒွတ္တဘောင်မင်းကြီး, also spelt Dwattabaung) was the 3rd king and founder of the Sri Ksetra Kingdom. According to the royal chronicles, he ascended the throne in 444 BCE after the legendary founding of the city of Sri Ksetra by his father Maha Thanbawa. He would rule for seventy years, with his primary legend surrounding his conflict with Beikthano's queen Panhtwar that led to his death after he used a handkerchief made from Panhtwar's clothes.

== Legend ==
According to the Hmannan Yazawin, the royal chronicle of the 19th century Konbaung dynasty, Duttabaung was born to the exiled prince of the Tagaung Kingdom, Maha Thanbawa. Maha Thanbawa and his twin brother Sula Thanbawa founded a kingdom far south of their original home near the modern city of Pyay (also known as Prome) in 484 BCE. Maha Thanbawa was the first king of this new state for six years, followed by Sula Thanbawa for 35 years. Then, on the 101st year of the Buddhist era- around April 442 BCE, Duttabaung became king. Five great signs appeared, which had been prophesised to occur 100 years after the Buddha. Seven great men gathered, having received the divine signs, and turned Sri Ksetra into a city. The prior four towns of Sri Ksetra were centralised into this new city. It was also marked as a city by the building of gates, moats, a tower and a golden palace with the help of the deity Thagyamin (Indra). The palace had three buildings- one for each season with differing numbers of tiers layered on their roofs. When the palace was finished, he was crowned alongside two queens- his Pyu sister Sanda Devi and the Nāga princess Besandi. A hundred nobles from outside Jambudvīpa paid him tribute. At his coronation, he was presented with Areindama, a legendary spear, that he then used as an instrument of royal authority. The spear would later be wielded by Anawrahta in the 11th century when he united and formed the Bagan Kingdom.

Duttabaung is said to have built several Buddhist stupas and prominently emphasised the Buddha's teachings in his rulings and decisions.

Duttabaung is also said to have heard of the supernatural beauty of Princess Thonbanhla of the Taungnyo Kingdom, and summoned her to be his queen. However, his wives and concubines were immediately jealous and conspired to prevent her from meeting the king with false rumours, such as that she was an ogress of such proportions she could not fit through the gate. An alternate version of the legend had the consorts accuse her of withcraft based and exiled her. Thonbanhla was confined to a hut outside the city where she eventually died of sorrow never meeting Duttabuang. Duttabaung uncovered the deception and tried to meet her but found her dead of heartbreak and buried her, and say the princess' spirit in a dream. He dedicated a shrine to her and Thonbanhla was deified.

He is also said to have travelled Jambudvīpa on his bronze boat, the Lin Zin, to collect taxes that had not been paid, including to the land of his cousin Panhtwar, the queen regnant of the Pyu city state of Beikthano. Panhtwar, being devoted to Vishnu, tricked Duttabaung by presenting an innocuous handkerchief that was made from the cloth of her htamein skirt. When he wiped his face with this handkerchief, the mole on his forehead disappeared causing the Nāga princess Besandi to leave and Duttabaung to return heartbroken to his capital. He then accidentally spit into the ocean, angering the Nāga people who took his bronze boat into the depths, killing him.

An alternate version of this story from Beikthano tells that Duttabaung was smitten with love for Panhtwar and attempted to marry her. Panhtwar refused Duttabaung because the previous king of Sri Ksetra, Sula Thanbawa, had abandoned Panhtwar and her mother to take the Nāga princess Bedari as his queen upon ascending the throne. When she refused, Duttabaung waged war and burnt down Beikthano, captured her and made her his queen. Panhtwar's deceit was, in this version, revenge to take him down. However, she allegedly did so in secret plotting with other concubines and it is unknown if she was merely the scapegoat as Duttabaung did not accuse her after using the face-cloth.

While Besandi never bore him a son but Sanda Devi had his only son Duttayan who continued the lineage after Duttabaung was taken away by the Nāga in 374 BCE. Duttabaung reigned for 70 years.

According to New History of Mandalay Hill by Ashin Zawtika Bhivamsa, in c. 442 BCE (BE 101), the ruler of Möng Mit (modern day Momeik) presented one of his daughters to Duttabaung. She was exceptionally beautiful and was named Saw Myawaddy. The other queens grew jealous of Saw Myawaddy and conspired against her, spreading malicious rumors to the king. Enraged, the king was on the verge of issuing an execution order when he recalled the parting request of the ruler of Möng Mit. The latter had asked that if his daughter ever displeased the king, she should be banished rather than executed. Respecting this request, King Duttabaung spared her life but ordered her exile from the kingdom. As Saw Myawaddy traveled upstream along the Irrawaddy River, she reached a location approximately 2,000 ta (about 4 miles) southwest of a hill later known as Mandalay Hill. There, having reached full term with the king's child, she gave birth to a son known as Min Galay ("the Little King"). An Ananda Temple-style pagoda was later built at the site, which came to be known as Thardawya Pagoda (lit. "Pagoda of the Royal Son's Birth"), located below the Mahamuni Buddha Temple. The hill situated slightly to the north of the prince's birthplace was subsequently called Min Galay Taung (lit. "Little King’s Hill"). Over time, according to this account, the name evolved through linguistic change into Mandalay Taung (Mandalay Hill).

== Inconsistencies and historicity ==
The Hmannan itself provides uncertainty about the timeline of events. It notes that in older chronicles, one of the seven great men, Gavampati, is absent. Further, some chronicles also place the founding of the city and palace on the 11th day waxing of Tagu (around April) instead of on the 1st day waxing of Tagu. It also notes an inconsistency over the Lin Zin boat Duttabaung used to sail with and the bronze boat that the Nāga dragged him to his death with- citing that the original clearly indicates the two boats are different, but that chronicles in between the centuries conflate the two boats.

A local legend about the traditional Burmese shampoo tayaw kinpun also suggests that the tayaw and kinpun plants, when mixed with the ran, washed the spell of the handkerchief away and that Duttabaung regained his powers and the mole on his forehead. With his supernatural powers restored, he conquered Beikthano and became known as the "three-eyed king", remaining a glorious king. Furthermore, the alternative legend framing Panhtwar as a beautiful queen was first recorded in the 19th century from local oral history. Colonial historians of the Pyu had dismissed this alternate story for being an unsourced story first written shortly before their time.

According to historians G.H. Luce and Than Tun, current inscriptional evidence from archaeology at the Sri Ksetra site indicate that the kingdom's first dynasty, called the Wikyama (Vikrama) dynasty, was launched with the epochal date of 22 March 638, which later became the Burmese calendar, in 640 AD. Given the evidence for the dating of Sri Ksetra to earlier than the seventh century, it is likely that Pyu kings existed prior to names mentioned on the burial urns. However no archaeological evidence has been from the early 5th century BC date suggested by the Burmese chronicle source.

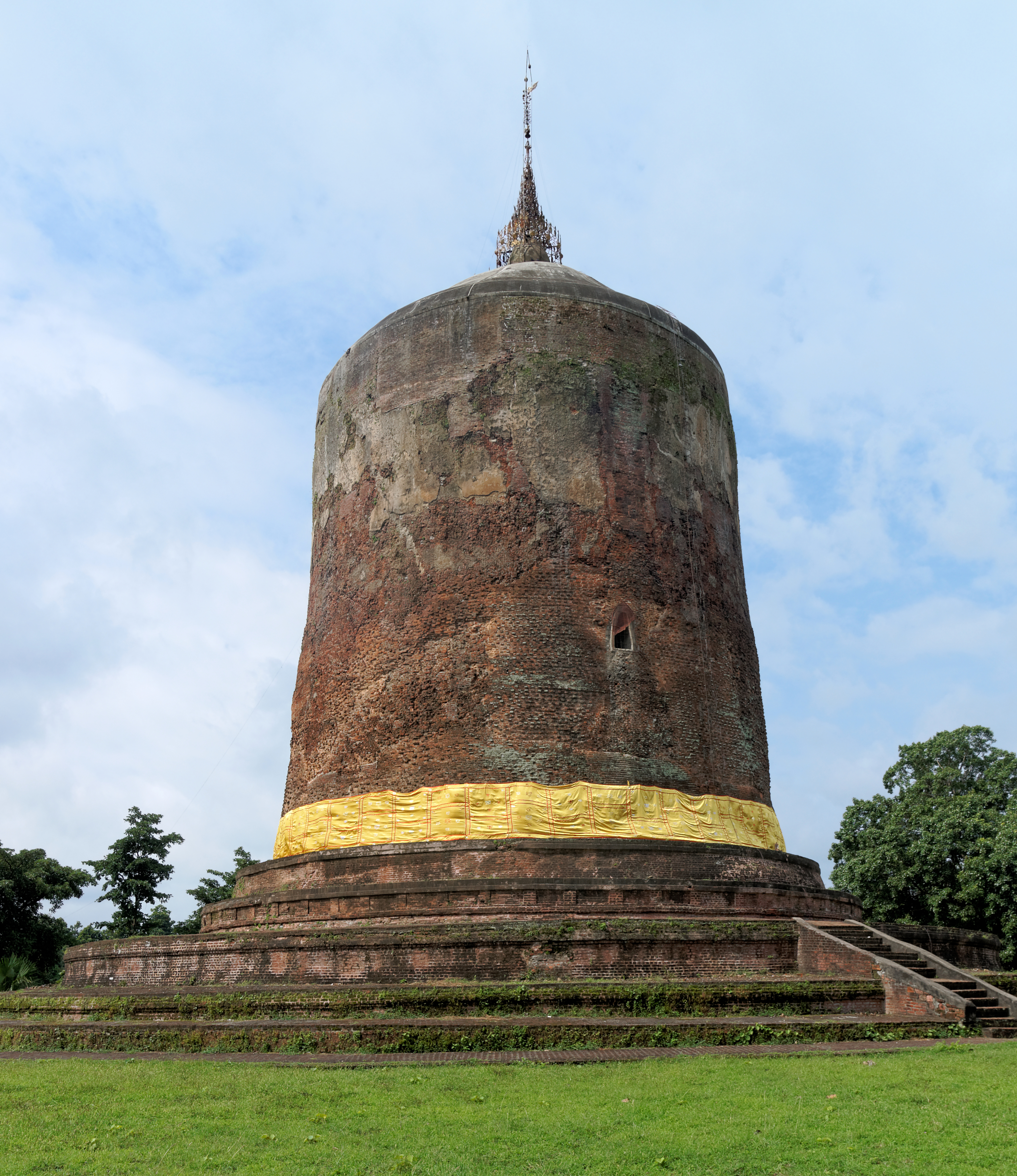
Bawbawgyi Stupa, Sri Ksetra

The "101 years since the Buddha" mentioned by the chronicle may be interpreted to actually be 101 Myanmar Era, placing Duttabaung's coronation at 739 AD. Other analyses of Pyu historiography also reveal a possibility that there were more than one King Duttabaungs- with the Duttbaung attributed to have built the Baw Baw Gyi Stupa in Sri Ksetra around 400AD to be a different ruler with the same name.

Archaeological excavations also show a mixture of Buddhism and Brahmanism at both Sri Ksetra and Beikthano. The legend of the war between the two states, may be symoblising the struggle between Shaivism and Vaishnavism. According to colonial administrator J.G. Scott, Panhtwar's magic drum and Duttbaung's mole are allusions to Shiva and Vishnu's symbols. Archaeologist Ramakrishna Rao identifies the destruction of Duttabaung's mole and Panhtwar's drum as symbolic of the conversion of the Pyu realm from following Hinduism towards Buddhism.

== Legacy ==
Duttabaung is regarded with veneration by the Burmese. For example, water from a well said to have been dug by him is presented as a great honour to visitors.

Duttabaung's story is also important to the Burmese conception of sovereignty as it relates to the nats. When kings go against Buddhist virtues, they lose control of the nat spirits and thereby allow the population to turn against him. The legend of Duttabaung connects Thagyamin to the symbols of power used by the Bagan Dynasty's kings and his fall from grace is narratively tied to later kings' fall from grace.

The story of Duttabaung using Panhtwar's htamein as a face towel is linked with the Burmese sociological concept of hpone - a spiritual power that only men are said to possess. By using the htamein, Duttabaung lost his hpone and thereby died in battle. It became part of the discourse of the 2021 Myanmar protests where the public shame surrounding displaying women's clothes was subverted into a weapon of resistance.

He is also memorialised by Prome Nawade's 15th century poem "Pyay: Pillar of Buddha".

In 2023, statues of Pyu dancers in Pyay were controversially destroyed to make way to build a statue of Duttabaung under the guidance of Sitagu Sayadaw, for alleged astrological purposes based on Sitagu Sayadaw likening military junta leader Min Aung Hlaing as a king full of wisdom.

== Bibliography ==
- Luce, Gordon H. (1985). Phases of Pre-Pagan: language and history. New York: Oxford University Press. ISBN 9780197135952.
- Myanmar Translation Society (1973). Burmese Encyclopedia. Vol. 13. Yangon.
- Phayre, Lt. Gen. Sir Arthur P. (1883). History of Burma (1967 ed.). London: Susil Gupta.
- Pyan Chi (2023). ပျူနိုင်ငံတော်နှင့်အခြားသမိုင်းဆောင်းပါးများ [The Ancient Pyu States and Other Historical Articles]. Yangon: Aung Si Thein.
- Royal Historical Commission of Burma (1832). Hmannan Yazawin (in Burmese). Vol. 1–3 (2014 ed.). Mandalay: Maha Gonyaung Pitaka Publishing.
- Scott, J.G. (1924). Burma from the earliest times to the present day. New York: A. A. Lnopf.
- Than Tun (1964). Studies in Burmese History (in Burmese). Vol. 1. Yangon: Maha Dagon.
- Tin Naing Toe (2013). သမိုင်းအတွေး သမိုင်းအရေး [Historical Thought, Historical Matters]. Lin Lun Khin Publishing.
- Tin, Pe Maung; Luce, Gordon (1923). The Glass Palace Chronicle of the Kings of Burma. London: Oxford University Press.
- Tin Win, Doctor Ma (2002). မင်းဆယ်ပါးရာဇဝင် [History of Ten Kings] (in Burmese). Yangon: Parami Publishing.
