= Pyu city-states =

Group of city-states in present-day Myanmar

Pyu city-states ပျူ မြို့ပြ နိုင်ငံများ Pyu myopya naingngan-myā
- c. 2nd century BCE–c. 1050 CE
- Sites of Pyu city-states in the Irrawaddy valley (modern Myanmar)
- Capital: Sri Ksetra, Halin, Beikthano, Pinle, Binnaka
- Common languages: Pyu
- Religion: Theravada Buddhism, Mahayana Buddhism, Tantric Buddhism
- Government: Monarchy
- Historical era: Classical antiquity
  - Earliest Pyu presence in Upper Myanmar (Burma): c. 2nd century BCE
  - Beikthano founded: c. 180 BCE
  - Pyu converted to Buddhism: 4th century
  - Burmese calendar begins: 22 March 638
  - 2nd Sri Ksetra Dynasty founded: 25 March 739
  - Rise of the Pagan Kingdom: c. 1050 CE
Preceded by	Succeeded by
Prehistory of Burma	Pagan Dynasty

Pyu Ancient Cities
UNESCO World Heritage Site
- Interactive map of Pyu Ancient Cities
- Location: Myanmar
- Includes: 1. Halin; 2. Beikthano; 3. Sri Ksetra
- Criteria: Cultural: (ii)(iii)(iv)
- Reference: 1444
- Inscription: 2014 (38th Session)
- Area: 5,809 ha (14,350 acres)
- Buffer zone: 6,790 ha (16,800 acres)
- Coordinates: 22°28′12″N 95°49′7″E

The Pyu city-states (Burmese: ပျူ မြို့ပြ နိုင်ငံများ [pjù mjo̼.pjɑ̼ nàɪɴŋàɴ mjá]) were a group of city-states that existed from about the 2nd century BCE to the mid-11th century in present-day Upper Myanmar. These city-states were founded as part of the migration of the Pyu people from Tibet to Mainland Southeast Asia by the Tibeto-Burman-speaking Pyu settlers, the earliest inhabitants of Burma of whom records are extant. The thousand-year period, often referred to as the Pyu millennium, linked the Bronze Age to the beginning of the classical states period when the Pagan Kingdom emerged in the late 9th century.

The major Pyu city-states were all located in the three main irrigated regions of Upper Burma: the Mu River Valley, the Kyaukse plains and Minbu region, around the confluence of the Irrawaddy and Chindwin Rivers. Five major walled cities- Beikthano, Maingmaw, Binnaka, Hanlin, and Sri Ksetra- and several smaller towns have been excavated throughout the Irrawaddy River basin. Halin, founded in the 1st century AD, was the largest and most important city until around the 7th or 8th century when it was superseded by Sri Ksetra (near modern Pyay) at the southern edge of the Pyu Realm. Twice as large as Halin, Sri Ksetra was eventually the largest and most influential Pyu centre. Only the city-states of Halin, Beikthano and Sri Ksetra are designated as UNESCO World Heritage Sites, where the other sites can be added in the future for an extension nomination.

The Pyu realm was part of an overland trade route between China and India. The Pyu culture was heavily influenced by trade with India, importing Buddhism as well as other cultural, architectural and political concepts, which would have an enduring influence on the political organisation and culture of Burma. The Pyu calendar, based on the Buddhist calendar, later became the Burmese calendar. The Pyu script, based on the Brahmi script, may have been the source of the Burmese script used to write the Burmese language.

The millennium-old civilisation came crashing down in the 9th century when the city-states were destroyed by repeated invasions from the Kingdom of Nanzhao. The Bamar people set up a garrison town at Bagan (Pagan) at the confluence of the Irrawaddy and Chindwin Rivers. Pyu settlements remained in Upper Burma for the next three centuries but the Pyu gradually were absorbed into the expanding Pagan Kingdom. The Pyu language still existed until the late 12th century. By the 13th century, the Pyu had assumed the Burman ethnicity. The histories and legends of the Pyu were also incorporated into those of the Bamar.

== Background ==
Based on limited archaeological evidence, it is inferred that the earliest cultures existed in Burma as early as 11,000 BCE, mainly in the central dry zone close to the Irrawaddy. The Anyathian, Burma's Stone Age, existed around the same time as the Lower Paleolithic and Middle Paleolithic eras in Europe. Three caves located near Taunggyi at the foothills of the Shan Hills have yielded Neolithic artefacts dated to 10,000–6000 BCE.

About 1500 BCE, people in the region were turning copper into bronze, growing rice, and domesticating chickens and pigs. By 500 BCE, iron-working settlements emerged in an area south of present-day Mandalay. Bronze-decorated coffins and burial sites filled with earthenware remains have been excavated. Archaeological evidence at Samon River Valley south of Mandalay suggests rice-growing settlements that traded with China between 500 BCE and 200 CE.

In about the 2nd century BCE, the Tibeto-Burman-speaking Pyu people began to enter the Irrawaddy River Valley from present-day Yunnan using the Taping and Shweli Rivers. The original home of the Pyu is reconstructed to be Qinghai Lake, which is located in the present-day provinces of Qinghai and Gansu. The Pyu, the earliest inhabitants of Burma of whom records are extant, went on to found settlements throughout the plains region centred on the confluence of the Irrawaddy and Chindwin Rivers that has been inhabited since the Paleolithic. The Pyu realm was longer than wide, stretching from Sri Ksetra in the south to Halin in the north, Binnaka and Maingmaw to the east and probably Ayadawkye to the west. The Tang dynasty's records report 18 Pyu states, nine of which were walled cities, covering 298 districts.

== Archaeology ==
The Pyu people were the earliest people in Southeast Asia to welcome in and adapt Brahmic scripts in order to record their tonal language, inventing tonal markers. Major inscriptions on stone in the Pyu language survive at Sri Ksetra, Hanlin and near Pinle (Maingmaw), and Bagan. The earliest evidence of Pyu writing dates to the third-fourth and fifth-sixth centuries CE.

The Pyu shared a type of urbanism on a wide variety of scales. They had walled spaces with one side sealed by a water tank or a tank outside of the walls. By late prehistory, the Pyu had settled for quite some time in Beikthano in the Yin River Valley and the Nawin River Valley at Sri Ksetra, proving their skills of water control using irrigation systems depending on good knowledge of the conditions in each locality and area. Sri Ksetra contained fields, irrigation canals, water tanks and iron-working sites, as well as monuments, markets and habitation areas both inside and outside the walls, retaining aspects of a cluster of villages.

At both Sri Ksetra and Beikthano, funerary halls with brick walls and wooden pillars containing cremated urn burials have been excavated, providing evidence of a powerful belief system in the elaborate provision of the dead. An aspect of funerary culture at Sri Ksetra not found so far at other Pyu sites are burial terraces, of which there were at least nine major ones outside the southern city walls, each containing hundreds or occasionally thousands of cremation burial urns.

Archaeological surveys have actually so far unearthed 12 walled cities, including five large walled cities, and several smaller non-fortified settlements, located at or near the three most important irrigated regions of precolonial Burma: the Mu River Valley in the north, the Kyaukse plains in centre, and the Minbu region in the south and west of the former two. The city-states were contemporaries of the Kingdom of Funan (Cambodia) and (perhaps) Champa (southern Vietnam), Dvaravati (Thailand), Tambralinga and Takuapa near the Kra Isthmus, and Srivijaya (southeast Sumatra). All these statelets foreshadowed the rise of the "classical kingdoms" of Southeast Asia in the second millennium CE.

== Decline of Pyu city-states ==
It was a long-lasting civilisation that lasted nearly a millennium to the early 9th century until a new group of "swift horsemen" from the north, the (Mranma) (Burmans) of the Nanzhao Kingdom entered the upper Irrawaddy valley through a series of raids. According to the Tang Dynasty chronicles, the Nanzhao began their raids of Upper Burma starting as early as 754 or 760. By 763, the Nanzhao king Ko-lo-feng had conquered the upper Irrawaddy Valley. Nanzhao raids intensified in the 9th century, with the Nanzhao raiding in 800–802, and again in 808–809. Finally, according to the Chinese, in 832, the Nanzhao warriors overran the Pyu country, and took away 3000 Pyu prisoners from Halin. (In 835, the Chinese records say the Nanzhao also raided a state, generally identified by some but not universally accepted to be a Pyu state.)

To be sure, the Pyu and their culture did not disappear just because 3000 of them were taken away. The size of the Pyu realm and its many walled cities throughout the land indicates a population many times over. Indeed, no firm indications at Sri Ksetra or at any other Pyu site exist to suggest a violent overthrow. It is more likely that these raids significantly weakened the Pyu states, enabling the Burmans to move into Pyu territories. At any rate, evidence shows that the actual pace of Burman migration into the Pyu realm was gradual. Radiocarbon dating shows that human activity existed until c. 870 at Halin, the subject of the 832 Nanzhao raid. The Burmese chronicles claim the Burmans founded the fortified city of Pagan (Bagan) in 849 but the oldest radiocarbon dated evidence at Pagan (old walls) points to 980 CE while the main walls point to circa 1020 CE, just 24 years earlier than the beginning of the reign of Anawrahta, the founder of Pagan Empire.

At any rate, the Burmans had overtaken the leadership of the Pyu realm by the late 10th century, and went on to found the Pagan Empire in the middle of the 11th century, unifying the Irrawaddy valley and its periphery for the first time. Nonetheless, the Pyu had left an indelible mark on Pagan whose Burman rulers would incorporate the histories and legends of the Pyu as their own. The Burman kings of Pagan claimed descent from the kings of Sri Ksetra and Tagaung as far back as 850 BCE—a claim dismissed by most modern scholars. Pyu settlements remained in Upper Burma for the next three centuries but the Pyu gradually were absorbed and assimilated into the expanding Pagan Empire. The Pyu language still existed until the late 12th century but by the 13th century, the Pyu had assumed the Burman ethnicity and disappeared into history.

== City-states ==
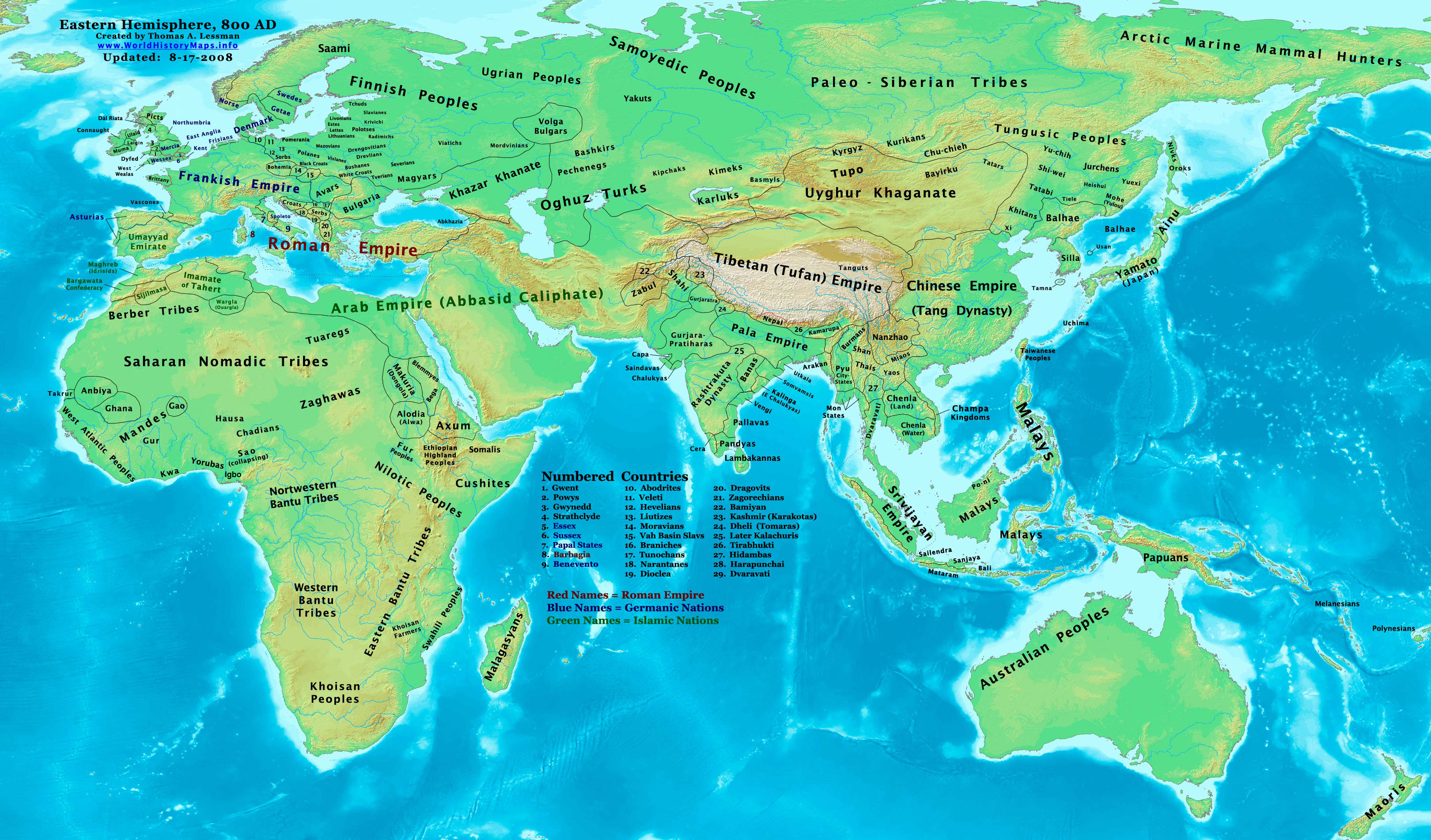
Pyu realm circa 800 CE, before the advent of the Mranma

Of the 12 walled cities excavated thus far, five are the remains of largest Pyu states: Beikthano, Maingmaw, Binnaka, Halin and Sri Ksetra.

=== Beikthano ===
Beikthano (Burmese: ဗိဿနိုး [beɪʔθənó]) situated in the irrigated Minbu region (near present-day Taungdwingyi) with direct land access to the well-watered Kyaukse plains to its northeast, is the oldest urban site so far discovered and scientifically excavated site. Its remains—the structures, pottery, artefacts, and human skeletons—date from 200 BCE to 100 CE. Named after the Hindu god Vishnu, the city may be the first capital of a culturally and perhaps even politically uniform state in the history of Burma. It was a large fortified settlement, measuring approximately 300 hectares inside the rectangular (3 km × 1 km (1.86 mi × 0.62 mi)) walls. The walls and fortifications along it measured 6 metres (20 ft) thick, and are radiocarbon dated to a period between 180 BCE and 610 CE. Like most subsequent cities, the main entrance of the walls led to the palace, which faced east. Stupas and monastic buildings have also been excavated within the city walls.

=== Maingmaw ===
Maingmaw (မိုင်းမော [máɪɰ̃ mɔ́]), also called Mong Mao (not to be confused with Mong Mao), located in the Kyaukse region, was circular in shape, and has tentatively been dated to the first millennium BCE. It is also sometimes called Pinle after the village near its modern site in Myittha Township and should not be confused with Pinle Pyu, a speculated Pyu city in Southern Myanmar. At 2.5 km (1.6 mi) in diameter and 222 hectares, Maingmaw is one of the largest ancient cities on the entire Kyaukse plains. It has two inner enclosure walls, the outer of which is square while the inner one is circular. The plan of a circle within a square suggest a zodiac sign which represents a view of the heavens from the perspective of the sun, the manner in which 19th century Mandalay was also conceptualised. At almost dead centre, a 19th-century temple called Nandawya Paya, which was probably built upon the ruins of an ancient one. The city is bisected by a canal, thought to be contemporary to the city, though no scientific dating has confirmed it. Excavations—the first of which was carried out in 1979—have unearthed many artefacts, including jewellery, silver coins, and funerary urns. Many of the artefacts such as the coins and funerary urns are virtually identical to those found in Beikthano and Binnaka.

=== Binnaka ===
Binnaka (ဘိန္နက [bèɪɰ̃nəka̰]) too was located in the Kyaukse region, and virtually identical to its neighbour Maingmaw in numerous ways. Its brick structures shared the same floor plan as those found at Beikthano and other Pyu sites. Excavations have recovered pre-Buddhist artefacts, gold necklaces, precious stone images of elephants, turtles and lions, distinctive Pyu pottery, terracotta tablets with writing that strongly resembled the Pyu script, and various kinds of acid-etched onyx beads along with others made of amber and jade. Also excavated are distinctive silver coins identical to those found at Beikthano and Binnaka, stone moulds for casting silver and gold ornamental flowers, a gold armlet in association with a silver bowl that has Pyu writing on it, and funerary urns virtually identical to those found Beikthano and Binnaka.

Both Maingmaw and Binnaka may have been contemporary of Beikthano. The chronicles, which do not mention Beikthano at all, do mention the two, though not specifically as Pyu cities. The chronicles state that the ruler of Binnaka was responsible for the fall of Tagaung, the city identified by the chronicles as the original home of Burmese speakers. Binnaka was inhabited until about the 19th century, according to a Konbaung era palm-leaf sittan (record) discovered there.>

=== Halin ===
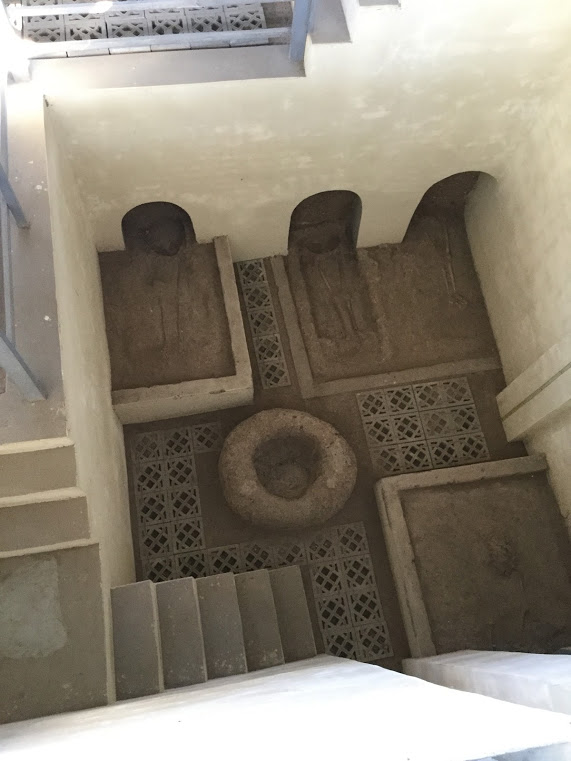
Halin

Halin or Halingyi (ဟန်လင်းကြီး [həlɪ́ɰ̃dʑí]), located in the Mu valley, one of the largest irrigated regions of precolonial Burma, is the northernmost Pyu city so far discovered. The earliest artefacts of Halin—city's wooden gates—are radiocarbon dated to 70 CE. The city was rectangular but with curved corners, and brick-walled. Excavated walls are approximately 3.2 km (2.0 mi) long on the north–south axis and 1.6 km (0.99 mi) on the east–west. At 664 hectares, the city was nearly twice the size of Beikthano. It has four main gates at the cardinal points, and a total of 12 gates, based on the zodiac. A river or canal ran through the city. Traces of a moat exist on all sides except the south, where it was probably not needed, as land was dammed there to create reservoirs.

This design of the city influenced the city planning of later Burmese cities and the Siamese city of Sukhothai. For example, the number of gates and configuration was also found in subsequent major Burmese capitals such as the 11th century Pagan and 19th century Mandalay. The city's configuration was also found at other contemporary cities such as Maingmaw and Beikthano in the Pyu realm and Danyawaddy and Wethali in Arakan as well as later cities such as Sukhothai, which emerged over a millennium later. Structural remains of temples at Halin show that the design of city's temples influenced the 11th to 13th century temples at Pagan. Excavated artefacts point to Halin's Pyu script to be the earliest writing in the Pyu realm (and in Burma). It was based on an earlier version of the Brahmi script (Mauryan and Guptan). Inscriptions at Sri Ksetra show a later version of the same script.

Known for the production of salt, a highly prized commodity in the first millennium, Halin was superseded by Sri Ksetra as the premier Pyu city-state circa 7th century. By the Chinese accounts, Halin remained an important Pyu centre until the 9th century when the Pyu realm came under repeated attacks from the Nanzhao Kingdom. The Chinese records state that the city was destroyed by the Nanzhao warriors in 832 CE, with 3000 of its inhabitants taken away. However, radiocarbon dating reveals human activity to about 870 CE, nearly four decades after the reported sack of the city.

=== Sri Ksetra ===
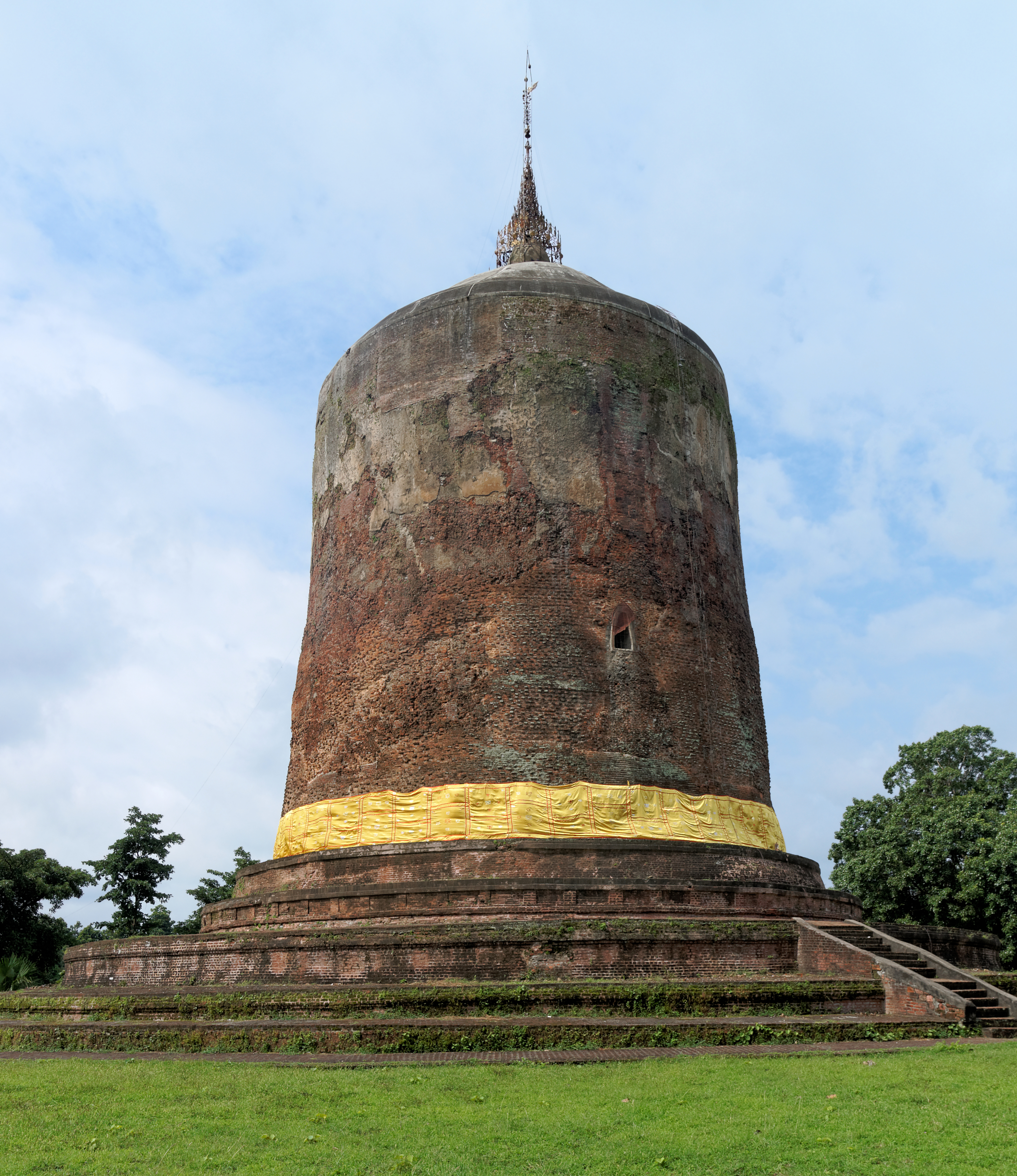
Bawbawgyi Pagoda at Sri Ksetra, prototype of Pagan-era pagodas

Sri Ksetra or Thaye Khittaya (သရေခေတ္တရာ [θəjè kʰɪʔtəjà]; lit., "Field of Fortune" or "Field of Glory"), located 8 km (5.0 mi) southeast of Prome (Pyay) at present-day Hmawza village, was the last and southernmost Pyu capital. The city was founded between the 5th and 7th centuries,although during two of the recent excavations, January to February 2015 and December 2015 to February 2016, led by Janice Stargardt in Yahanda mound at Sri Ksetra, sherds stamped with Buddhist motifs were found, dated from c. 340 +/- 30 CE. and Pyu culture cremation burials around 270 +/- 30 CE. Sri Ksetra likely overtook Halin as the premier Pyu city by the 7th or 8th century, and retained that status until the Mranma arrived in the 9th century. The city was home to at least two dynasties, and maybe three. The first dynasty, called the Vikrama Dynasty, is believed to have launched the Pyu calendar, which later became the Burmese calendar, on 22 March 638. The second dynasty was founded by King Duttabaung on 25 March 739 (11th waxing of Tagu 101 ME).

Sri Ksetra is the largest Pyu site discovered thus far. (Only Beikthano and Sri Ksetra have been extensively excavated. Other important Pyu cities as Maingmaw and Binnaka could yield more artefacts with more extensive excavations.) It occupied a larger area than that of the 11th century Pagan or 19th century Mandalay. Circular in design, Sri Ksetra was more than 13 km (8.1 mi) in circumference and three to four km across, or about 1400 hectares of occupied area. The city's brick walls were 4.5 metres (15 ft) high, and had 12 gates with huge devas (deities) guarding the entrances and a pagoda at each of the four corners.

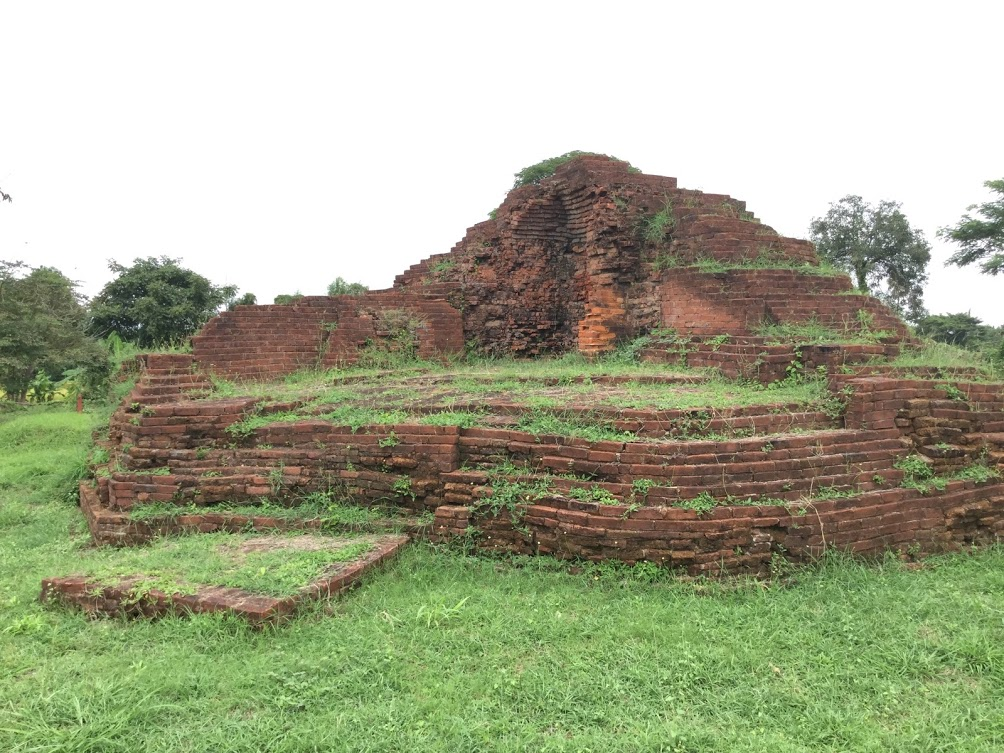
Sri Ksetra

It also has curving gateways, such as those found at Halin and Beikthano. In the centre of the city was what most scholars think represented the rectangular palace site, 518 by 343 metres (1,699 ft × 1,125 ft), symbolising both a mandala and a zata (horoscope), like in Maingmaw. Only the southern half of the city was taken up by the palace, monasteries and houses; the entire northern half consisted of rice fields. Together with the moats and walls, this arrangement ensured that the city could withstand a long siege by enemies.

Sri Ksetra was an important entrepôt between China and India. It was located on the Irrawaddy, not far from the sea as the Irrawaddy delta had not yet been formed. Ships from the Indian Ocean could come up to Prome to trade with the Pyu realm and China. Trade with India brought deep cultural contacts. Sri Ksetra has yielded the most extensive remains of Theravada Buddhism. Religious art suggests several distinct occupations with earlier influences stemming from Southeast India and later influences from Southwest India while 9th century influences include those from the Nanzhao Kingdom. Much of the Chinese account of the Pyu states was through Sri Ksetra. Chinese pilgrims Xuanzang in 648 and Yijing in 675 mentioned Sri Ksetra in their accounts of Buddhist kingdoms of Southeast Asia. The Tang histories mention the arrival at the court of an embassy from the Pyu capital in 801.

=== Tagaung ===
A small but politically significant Pyu site is Tagaung (တကောင်း [dəɡáʊɰ̃]) located in Tagaung, Mandalay Region (about 200-km north of Mandalay) where Pyu artefacts including funerary urns have been excavated. Tagaung pottery is similar in size and cluster positions to other Pyu vessels but is otherwise very different to those further south. This may indicate a degree of influence from other sources or that it is markedly different from the central Pyu culture. The significance of Tagaung is due to the fact that the Burmese chronicles identify Tagaung as the home of the first Burmese kingdom. Aside from Beikthano and Sri Ksetra, most Pyu sites have not seen extensive or any excavation.

=== Pinle ===
The lost city described as Pinle Pyu (ပင်လယ်ပျူ [pɪ̀ɰ̃.lɛ̀ pjù], lit. 'Sea Pyu') is recorded as being located next to the sea. Unlike many other small Pyu sites, the city is speculated to be large in size located downstream from Sri Ksetra.

Some archaeologists believe that ruins near Ingapu, Ayeyarwady Region may be the location of Pinle Pyu. Historian Phone Tint Kyaw led a team to study the area in 2009 and concluded the site may be a Pyu site based on the use of Brahmi script, a script that dates towards the third century BC, and the architectural similarities to other Pyu sites, particularly a site in Shwedaung, Bago Region further up the Irrawaddy River. The ancient site itself was built symmetrically on a mountain ridge designed around stupas and water features. Based on its scale and the administrative societal structures of the Pyu period, the city would have been built by a monarch, rather than a feudal lord. Its absence in the Bagan Kingdom's fourth period records also indicates that the city likely fell into ruin well before the 11th century AD. However, more evidence and investigation is required to analyze the ancient artifacts found in the site. Finds from another site nearby include paleolithic tools and fossilized footprints, indicate that the overall area may be older than other Pyu sites.

== Smaller settlements ==
The New History of the Tang states the kingdom of Mi-ch'en sent an embassy to China in 805, and was attacked by Nanchao in 835.

Many Pyu settlements have been found across Upper Burma in Myinmu Township, near the mouth of the Mu river. One notable site is Ayadawkye Ywa in the Mu valley west of Halin lies south of another recently discovered Bronze Age site called Nyaunggan. Further south in Myingyan Township, west of Maingmaw, the Wati site (also spelled Wa Tee) is the remnants of a circular walled city.

There were also Pyu settlements in Lower Burma that may have been ignored or overlooked by the historical records aimed at legitimizing Upper Burmese kings' lineage. The Sagara (Thagara) site in Dawei is one such site comparable to Tagaung. Archaeological excavations in 2001 revealed several artifacts including terracotta urns in rice fields southeast of the walled site. Near Sagara, the site of Mokti has also revealed similar artifacts. The stupa in Sagara and votive tablets found at the site of Mokti are considered to have many 'Pyu' cultural traits but other artifacts show evidence of many cultural influences.

== Economy ==
=== Agriculture ===
The economy of the Pyu city states was based on agriculture and trade. All important Pyu settlements were located in the three main irrigated regions of Upper Burma, centred on the confluence of the Irrawaddy and Chindwin rivers: Halin in the Mu valley, Maingmaw and Binnaka in the Kyaukse plains, finally Beikthano and Sri Ksetra at or near the Minbu district. (The irrigation projects of the Pyu were later picked up by the Burmans. King Anawrahta of Pagan would build irrigation projects in these three regions in the 1050s to turn them into the main rice granaries of Upper Burma. They would give Upper Burma an enduring economic base from which to dominate the Irrawaddy valley and its periphery in the following centuries.) The Pyu grew rice, perhaps of the Japonica variety.

=== Trade ===
The Pyu realm was an important trading centre between China and India in the first millennium CE. Two main trading routes passed through the Pyu states. As early as 128 BCE, an overland trade route between China and India existed across the northern Burma. An embassy from the Roman Empire to China passed through this route in 97 CE and again in 120 CE. But the majority of the trade was conducted by sea through the southern Pyu states, which at the time were located not far from the sea as much of the Irrawaddy delta had not yet been formed, and as far south as upper Tenasserim coast towns such as Winga, Hsindat-Myindat, Sanpannagon and Mudon where Pyu artefacts have been found. (It is insufficient to conclude however that the Pyu had administrative and military control over these upper Tenasserim coastal towns.) The ports connected the overland trade route to China via present-day Yunnan.

The trading area of the Pyu states spanned across the present-day Southeast Asia, South Asia and China. Artifacts from the 2nd century northwest India to Java and the Philippines have been found at Beikthano. Likewise, Pyu artefacts have been found along the coasts of Arakan, Lower Burma, and as far east as Óc Eo (in present-day southern Vietnam). The Pyu also conducted trade and diplomatic relations with China. In 800 and 801–802, Sri Ksetra sent a formal embassy, along with 35 musicians to the Tang court. According to the Chinese, the Pyu used gold and silver coinage. But only silver coins have survived.

=== Currency ===
A notable feature of the Pyu states is the minting and use of silver coinage. Originated in the Pegu area, these coins date from the 5th century and were the model for most first millennium coinage in mainland Southeast Asia. The earliest type of these coins is not inscribed and depicts a conch on one side and a Srivatsa on the other. Many of the coins had a small hole along the perimeter, and may have also been used as amulets. Remarkably, after the use of coins ceased at the end of Pyu period in the late 9th century, coins did not reappear in the Burmese kingdoms until the 19th century.

== Culture ==
=== Religion ===
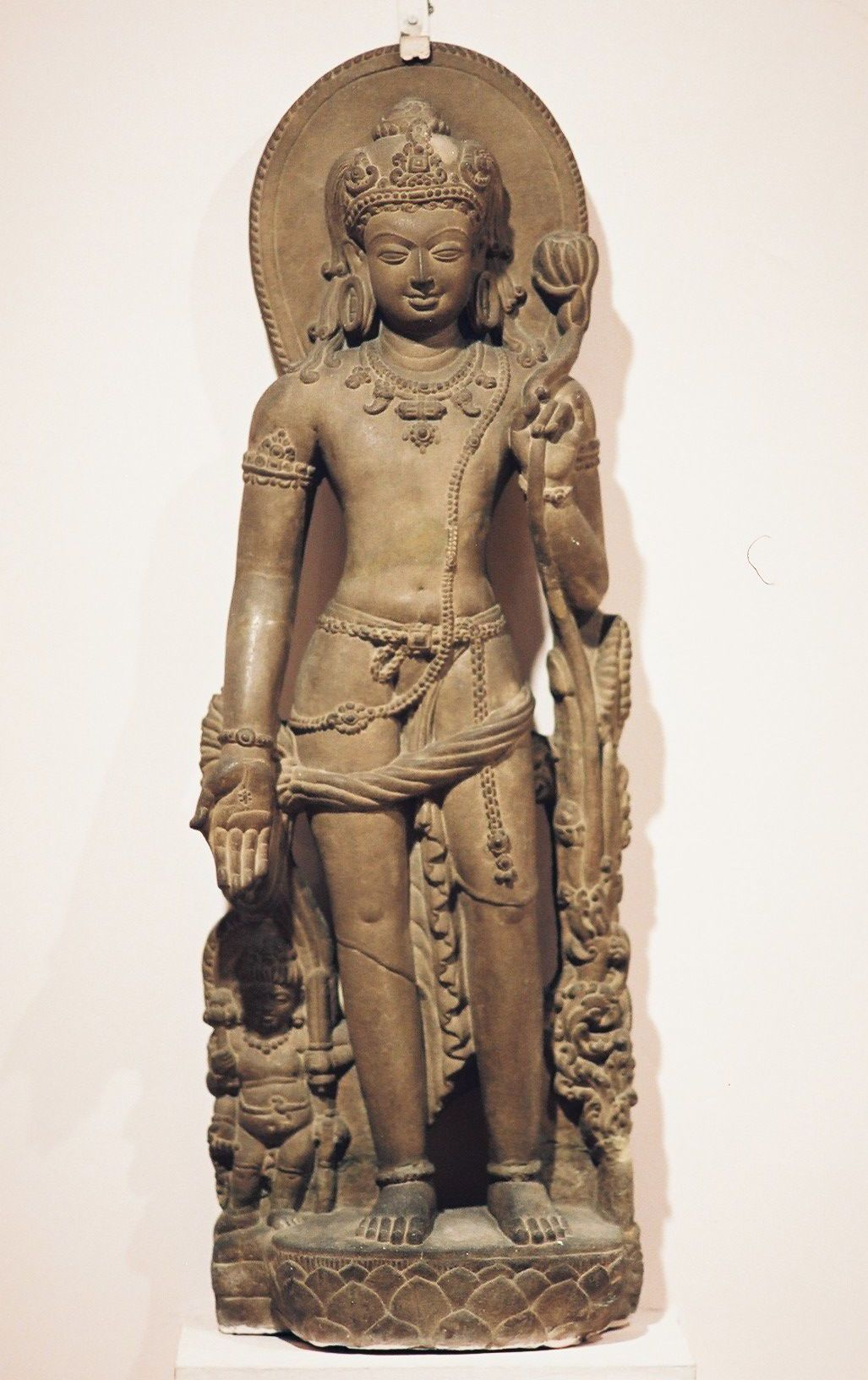
Avalokiteśvara holding a lotus flower. Bihar, 9th century, CE. The Pyu followed a mix of religious traditions.

The culture of Pyu city states was heavily influenced by India. Indian culture was most visible in the southern Pyu realm through which most trade with India was conducted by sea. The names of southernmost cities were in Pali or Sanskrit derived like Sri Ksetra (Thaye Khittaya) and Vishnu (Beikthano). The kings at Sri Ksetra titled themselves as Varmans and Varma. It was not just a southern phenomenon. To varying degrees, northern Pyu cities and towns also became under the sway of Indian culture. The Burmese chronicles claim that the founding kings of Tagaung were descended from no less than the Sakya clan of the Buddha himself.

By the 4th century, most of the Pyu had become predominantly Buddhist, though archaeological finds prove that their pre-Buddhist practices remained firmly entrenched in the following centuries. According to the excavated texts, as well as the Chinese records, the predominant religion of the Pyu was Theravada Buddhism. The Theravada school prevalent in the Pyu realm was probably derived from the Andhra region in southeast India, associated with the famous Theravada Buddhist scholar, Buddhagosa. It was the predominant Theravada school in Burma until the late 12th century when Shin Uttarajiva led the realignment with Ceylon's Mahavihara school.

The archaeological finds also indicate a widespread presence of Tantric Buddhism, Mahayana Buddhism and Hinduism. Avalokiteśvara (Lokanatha) (called Lawkanat in Burmese; လောကနတ် [lɔ́ka̰ naʔ]), Tara, Manusi Buddhas, Vaiśravaṇa, and Hayagriva, all prominent in Mahayana Buddhism, were very much part of Pyu (and later the Pagan) iconography scene. Various Hindu Brahman iconography ranging from the Hindu trinity, Brahma, Vishnu and Shiva, to Garuda and Lakshmi have been found, especially in Lower Burma.

Non-Theravada practices such as ceremonial cattle sacrifice and alcohol consumption were main stays of the Pyu life. Likewise, the greater prominence of nuns and female students than in the later eras may point to pre-Buddhist notions of female autonomy. In melding of their pre-Buddhist practices to Buddhist ones, they placed the remains of their cremated dead in pottery and stone urns and buried them in or near isolated stupas, a practice consistent with early Buddhist practices of interring the remains of holy personages in stupas.

Though their religious beliefs was a syncretic mix of many backgrounds, probably like in the early Pagan period, the outlook of the Pyu reportedly was largely peaceful. Tang Chinese records describe the Pyu as a humane and peaceful people to whom war was virtually unknown and who wore silk cotton instead of actually silk so that they would not have to kill silk worms, and that many Pyu boys entered the monastic life at seven to the age of 20. To be sure, this peaceful description by the Chinese was a snapshot of the Pyu realm, and may not represent the life in the city-states in general.

=== Language and script ===
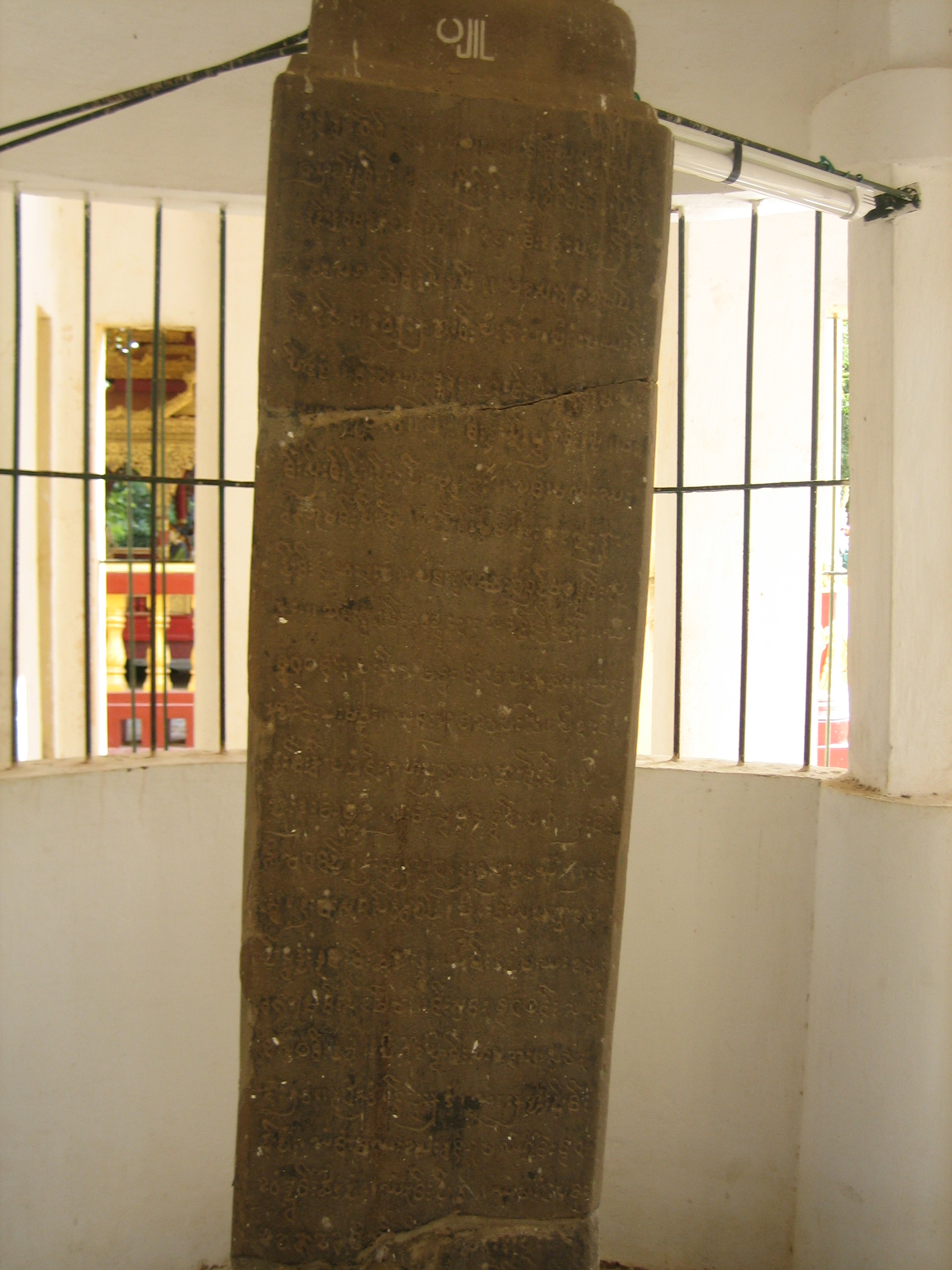
The Myazedi inscription c. 1112–1113 in Pyu

The Pyu language was a Tibeto-Burman language, related to Old Burmese. But it apparently co-existed with Sanskrit and Pali as the court language. The Chinese records state that the 35 musicians that accompanied the Pyu embassy to the Tang court in 800–802 played music and sang in the Fan (Sanskrit) language. Many of the important inscriptions were written in Sanskrit and/or Pali, alongside the Pyu script. Recent scholarship, though yet not settled, suggests that the Pyu script, based on the Brahmi script, may have been the source of the Burmese script used to write the Burmese language. The Pyu sites have yielded a wide variety of Indian scripts from King Ashoka's edicts written in north Indian Brahmi and Tamil Brahmi, both dated to the 3rd and 2nd centuries BCE, to the Gupta script and Kannada script dated to the 4th to 6th centuries CE.

=== Calendar ===
In addition to religion, the Pyu also imported science and astronomical expertise from India. The Chinese records also report that the Pyu knew how to make astronomical calculations. The Pyu calendar was based on the Buddhist calendar. There were two eras in use. The first was the Sakra Era, which was adopted in the Pyu realm in 80 CE, just two years after the new era had come into use in India. A second calendar was adopted at Sri Ksetra in 638, superseding the Sakra Era. The calendar, the first day of which was 22 March 638, later became the Burmese calendar, and is still in use in present-day Myanmar. (The existence of two Pyu calendars has been cause for dispute among scholars trying interpret the dates on the finds.)

== Architecture ==
=== Irrigation structures ===
The Pyu-era architectural practices greatly influenced later Pagan and Burmese architecture. The techniques of building dams, canals and weirs found in pre-colonial Upper Burma trace their origins to the Pyu era and the Pagan era. (Burmans likely introduced new water management methods, especially the canal building techniques which became the prevailing method of irrigation in the Pagan era.)

=== City planning ===
The Pyu city plans, consisted of square/rectangles and circles, were a mix of indigenous and Indian designs. It is believed that circular patterns inside the cities were Pyu while the rectangle or square shape of the outer walls and the use of 12 gates were Indian in origin. According to historian Cooler, "the adoption of Indian concepts of city planning incorporated a belief in the efficacy of the world axis that connects the centermost point in a properly constructed Mandala city with the city of the Gods above (Tavatimsa heaven) in order to assure prosperity throughout the kingdom below". Pyu-era city practices were the forefathers of the latter-day Burmese city and palace designs down to the 19th century Mandalay.

=== Temple design ===
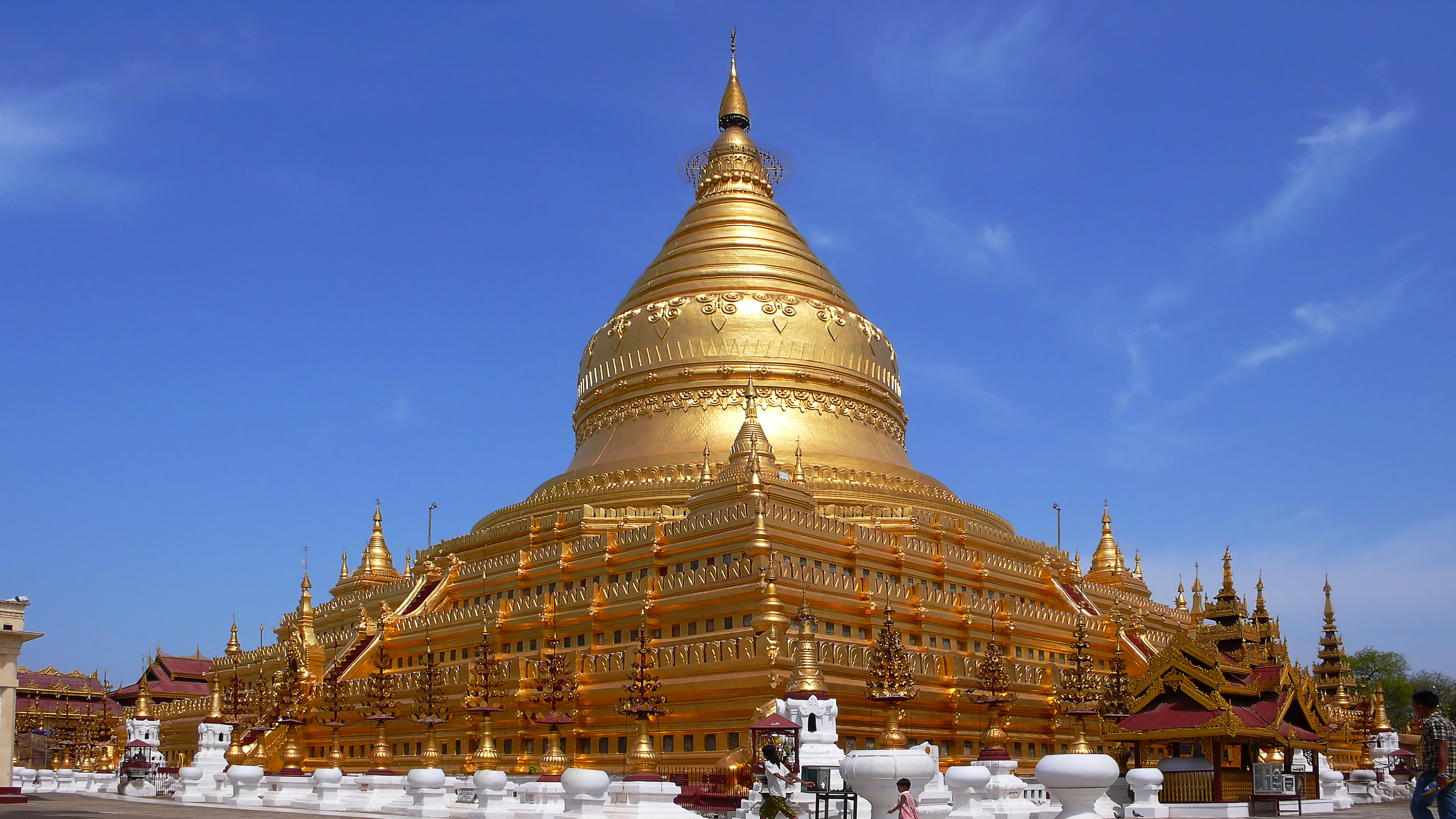
Shwezigon Pagoda (built in the 11th century) at Pagan, based on earlier Pyu design

From the 4th century onward, the Pyu built many Buddhist stupas and other religious buildings. The styles, ground plans, even the brick size and construction techniques of these buildings point to the Andhra region, particularly Amaravati and Nagarjunakonda in present-day southeastern India. Some evidence of Ceylonese contact is seen by the presence of Anuradhapura style "moonstones" discovered at Beikthano and Halin. By perhaps the 7th century, tall cylindrical stupas such as the Bawbawgyi, Payagyi and Payama had emerged at Sri Ksetra.

The Pyu architecture greatly influenced later Burmese Buddhist temple designs. For example, temples at Sri Ksetra such as the Bebe and Lemyethna were prototypes for the later hollow (gu) temples of Pagan. The floor plan of the 13th century Somingyi Monastery at Pagan was largely identical to that of a 4th-century monastery at Beikthano. The solid stupas of Sri Ksetra were in turn prototypes for Pagan's such as the Shwezigon, Shwehsandaw, and Mingalazedi, and ultimately, the Shwedagon in modern Yangon.

== Demography ==
The city-states were mainly populated by the Tibeto-Burman-speaking Pyu people, who like their cousins Burmans are believed to have migrated from the present Qinghai and Gansu provinces in north-central China, via Yunnan Extensive external trade attracted sizeable communities of Indians and the Mon, especially in the south. In the north, trickles of Burmans may have entered the Pyu realm from Yunnan as early as the 7th century. (Modern scholarship however holds that Burmans did not arrive in large numbers until the mid-to-late 9th century, and perhaps as late as the 10th century, according to radiocarbon dating of Pagan's walls.)

The size of population of the Pyu realm was probably a few hundred thousand, given that the 17th and 18th century Burma (about the size of present-day Myanmar) only had about 2 million people.

== Administration ==
The Pyu settlements were ruled by independent chiefs. The chiefs at larger city-states later styled themselves as kings, and established courts largely modelled after the Indian (Hindu) concepts of monarchy. Not all Hindu concepts such as divine kingship were fully adopted due to the presence of Theravada Buddhism. It is not clear if a vassalage-overlord relationship existed between the larger city-states and smaller towns. The Burmese chronicles mention alliances between the states such as one between Beikthano and Sri Ksetra. By and large, each Pyu city-state appeared to have controlled just the city itself.

The large size of the Pyu cities (660 to 1400 hectares) vis-a-vis Pagan (only 140 hectares) suggests that much of the population resided within the walls, as corroborated by the Chinese records. Archaeology in Pagan produced Pyu artefacts across a number of the settlements in the enclosed complex dating to the first millennium, until approximately 1100 C.E. when a shift to a monument-rich state and diffusion beyond walled boundaries is evident.

== Current status of the finds ==
Aside from Sri Ksetra and Beikthano, the rest of the Pyu sites have not been extensively excavated. The care of the sites falls under the purview of the Ministry of Culture's Department of Archaeology. In November 2011, the department reportedly was planning a museum at Sri Ksetra, and working with the UNESCO to gain recognition for Sri Ksetra, Beikthano and Halin as World Heritage Sites and the three old cities were recognised as World Heritage Sites in 2014.

== See also ==
- History of Burma
- Mon city-states
- Pagan Dynasty
