= Sri Ksetra kingdom =

Ancient Pyu city-state in Southern Burma

Kingdom of Sri Ksetra သရေခေတ္တရာ
- c. 3rd – 9th century CE–c. 1050s
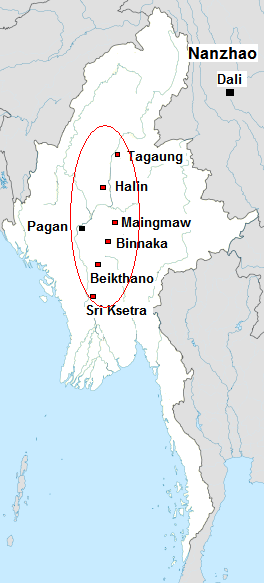
- Capital: Sri Ksetra
- Common languages: Pyu
- Religion: Buddhism, Animism, Vaishnavism
- Government: Monarchy
- Historical era: Classical Antiquity
  - Founding of kingdom: c. 3rd – 9th century CE
  - Launch of Burmese calendar: 21 March 640
  - Duttabaung ascends to throne: 25 March 739
  - Fall of kingdom: c. 1050s
Succeeded by
Pagan kingdom

Sri Ksetra (Śrī Kṣetra, Burmese: သရေခေတ္တရာ ပြည်, Burmese pronunciation: [θəjè kʰɪʔtəjà pjì]; Sanskrit: श्री क्षेत्र, lit. 'Field of Fortune' or 'Field of Glory'), located along the Irrawaddy River at present-day Hmawza, Myanmar, was once a prominent Pyu settlement. The Pyu occupied several sites across Upper Myanmar, with Sri Ksetra recorded as the largest, the city wall enclosing an area of 1,477 hectares, although a recent survey found it enclosed 1,857 hectares within its monumental brick walls, with an extramural area of a similar size, being the largest Southeast Asian city before Angkor times. Issues surrounding the dating of this site has meant the majority of material is dated between the seventh and ninth centuries AD, however recent scholarship suggests Pyu culture at Sri Ksetra was active centuries before this.

Sri Ksetra is the site for much of the Pyu artistic legacy. The arrival of Buddhism into the Pyu cities saw the increased artistic production, with very little surviving from the earlier period of occupation. The vast arraying of surviving material indicates a rich visual culture that was endorsed by the Pyu at Sri Ksetra. The Chinese pilgrims Xuanzang in 648 and Yijing in 675 mentioned the name of Sri Ksetra as 室利差呾羅/室利差怛羅 (Middle Chinese: syit lijH tsrhae tat la) and that it was a Buddhist country.

The Pyu at Sri Ksetra declined in prominence around the ninth century AD. The final mention of the Pyu is found at Pagan, with a twelfth century stone featuring inscriptions in Pyu, Mon, Burmese and Pali.

== History ==
Burmese legends greatly differ from the reconstruction of Pyu history by scholars. A widely held belief, based on the interpretation of the extensive interdisciplinary evidence suggests that Sri Ksetra was founded between the fifth and seventh centuries by the Pyu people. This interpretation has been challenged by the scholars who have argued that it was occupied earlier than these dates. Radiocarbon dating tested on charcoal found at Sri Ksetra produce dates to between 50 – 200 AD, a timeframe that is significantly earlier than previously considered. This early date in the first centuries of the first millennium AD would place the Pyu as one of the earliest urbanised people in Southeast Asia. During two excavation seasons, January to February 2015 and December 2015 to February 2016, led by Janice Stargardt in Yahanda mound at Sri Ksetra, early sherds stamped with Buddhist motifs were found, later dated c. 340 +/- 30 CE and Pyu culture cremation burials around 270 +/- 30 CE.

Sri Ksetra is the largest Pyu site discovered thus far (Beikthano and Sri Ksetra are the only Pyu sites that have been extensively excavated. Other important Pyu cities as Maingmaw and Binnaka could yield more artefacts with more extensive excavations). It occupied an area larger than that of the eleventh century Pagan or nineteenth century Mandalay. The city walls at Sri Ksetra are the largest of any Pyu settlements. Numerous ruined stupas and temples have been discovered both inside and outside the city walls at Sri Ksetra. The three principal stupas that are a feature of the Pyu landscape at Hmawza, Bawbaw gyi, Payama and Paya gyi, are also located outside the walls.

In conjunction to archaeological evidence, there are a number of written records that mention the Pyu, largely found in Chinese historical accounts. The earliest mention is the fourth century AD account by Ch'ang Ch'u, with later accounts by Chinese pilgrims Xuanzang and Yijing in the seventh century AD . In the eighth century AD Tang histories mentioned the arrival at the court of an embassy from the Pyu capital in 801. While these written records assist with the dating of Sri Ksetra and demonstrate cross-cultural interactions, they are fragmented and cannot all be backed by other evidence.

Sri Ksetra was an important entrepôt between China and India. It was located on the Irrawaddy, close to the sea, before the Irrawaddy delta had been formed. Ships from the Indian Ocean travelled to Prome to trade with the Pyu and Chinese. Trade with India brought important cultural influences to Sri Ksetra, including the arrival of Buddhism, which was imposed on existing belief systems. There is strong evidence of a rich Buddhist culture at Sri Ksetra, along with the existence of Hindu religion.

=== Royal names ===
Several inscriptions discovered at Sri Ksetra possess possible royal names and dynastic titles. Below is a table of translated Pyu funerary inscriptions found on four stone burial urns, excavated outside the city walls of Sri Ksetra from what is believed to be a royal burial site. First translated by O. Blagden in 1917, these inscriptions give insights into Pyu kingship and possible dating of Sri Ksetra.

Name	Date of death found in inscription	Equivalent date using Early Pyu Era	Equivalent date using Gupta Era	Equivalent date using Standard Pyu Era	Images
Relative of Thuriya Wikyama	35	113 CE	354 CE	673 CE	
Thuriya Wikyama (Suriya Vikrama)	Fifth month of year 50	128	369	July 688 (4 July to 1 August)	
Hayi Wikyama (Hari Vikrama)	24th day of 2nd month of year 57	135	376	13 April 695	
Thiha Wikyama (Siha Vikrama)	4th day of 2nd month of year 80	158	399	8 April 718	

Current inscriptional evidence indicate two distinct dynastic names, Wikyama (Vikrama) and Warman (Varman). The first dynasty, called the Wikyama (Vikrama) dynasty, is believed by G.H. Luce and Than Tun to have launched the Pyu calendar with the epochal date of 22 March 638, which later became the Burmese calendar, in 640 AD. Given the evidence for the dating of Sri Ksetra to earlier than the seventh century, it is likely that Pyu kings existed prior to names mentioned on the burial urns. Burmese chronicle sources, on the other hand, suggest the Sri Ksetra dynasty was established in 444 BC by King Duttabaung, however no archaeological evidence has been from this early date.

== Legend ==
According to Hmannan Yazawin, the royal chronicle of the Konbaung dynasty, the kingdom of Sri Ksetra was founded by two brothers named Maha Thanbawa and Sula Thanbawa in 484 BC. The brothers were scions of the Tagaung kingdom located in Upper Burma, and ultimately descended from kings Abhiyaza and Dazayaza, both of whom belonged to the Sakya clan of the Buddha. The brothers had been born blind, and ordered to be executed at birth by their own father Thado Maha Yaza for their blindness. Their mother, Keinnayi Dewi, however, had raised them in secret until 482 BC when the father discovered their existence, and ordered them killed once again. Their mother put the blind princes on a raft by their mother down the Irrawaddy river before the executioners of the king arrived. Adrift in the river, the brothers miraculously gained sight with the help of an ogress.

With their newfound vision, the brothers arrived at the environs of Sri Ksetra (near present-day Pyay (Prome)), whose Pyu inhabitants had been at war with Kanyan people. Having to lost their chief to the war, the Pyu nominated the newly arrived Maha Thanbawa as chief. The "kingdom" of Sri Ksetra was founded in 484 CE. (Hmannan does not indicate the extent of the kingdom.) In all, a total of 27 kings of this dynasty are said to have reigned for 578 years.

Hmannan continues that the end of the kingdom came in 94 AD due to a civil war between the Pyu and the Kanyan, two of the three main ethnic groups of the kingdom. (The Mranma (Burmans) were the third.) The Pyu initially emerged victorious over the Kanyan. But the victors soon broke into three rival groups, and a second round of war ensued. Taking advantage of the confusion, a fourth group, the Mon of Lower Burma drove all indigenous groups out of Sri Ksetra. One of the refugee groups led by Thamoddarit, nephew of the last king of Sri Ksetra, wandered on for a dozen years. In 107 AD, Thamoddarit founded the city of Pagan (Bagan) and the Pagan dynasty.

== Monuments and archaeological sites ==
=== Ramparts ===
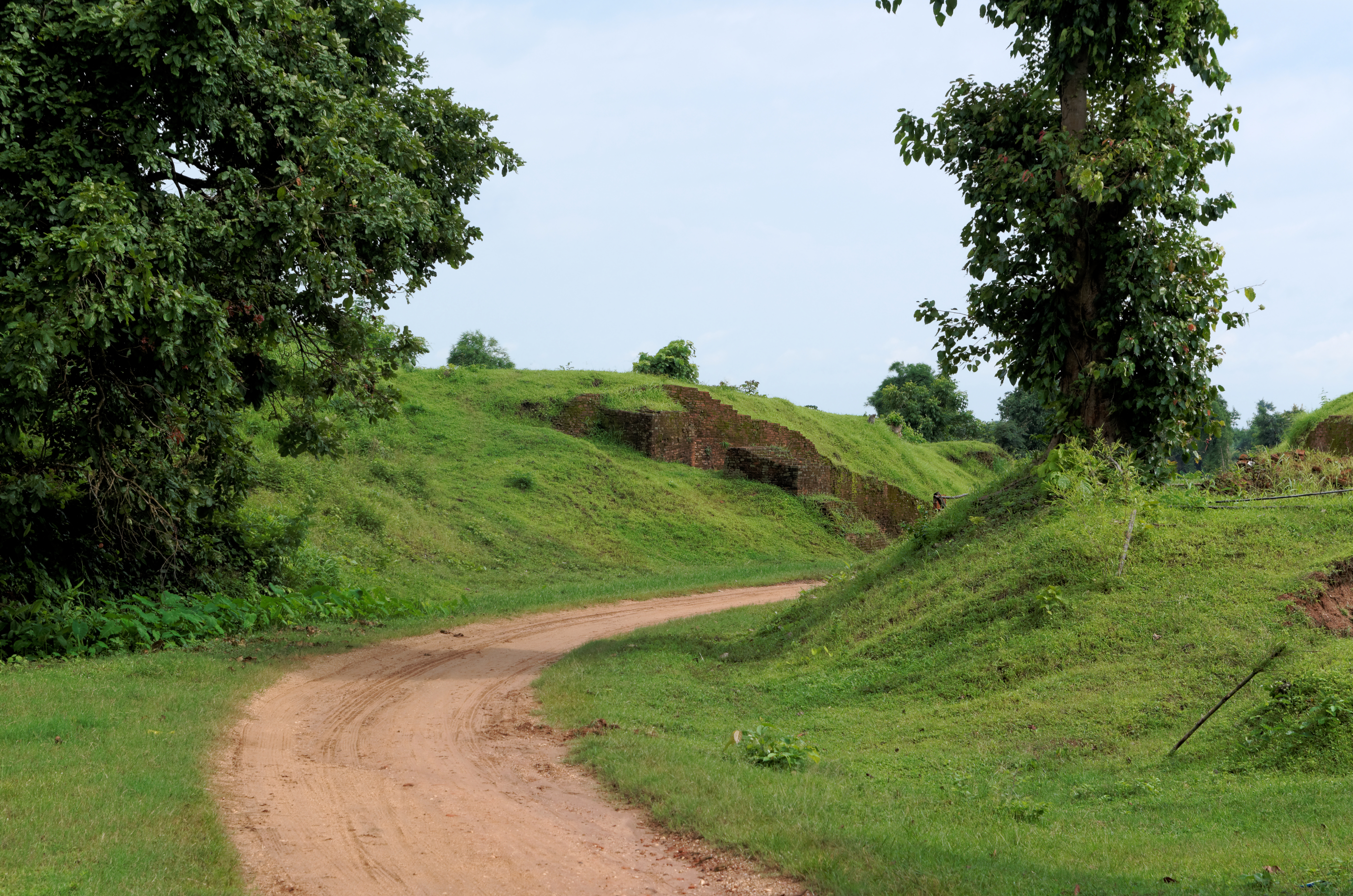
Sri Ksetra, Bago, Myanmar. Yahanda gate seen from outside the city.

Sri Ksetra is a large city site with ruins of many structures, palaces and stūpas. The most prominent feature of the city is the circular plan, marked by a semi-circle of ramparts on the north, south and western sides. Outside the ramparts there was a moat, marked by a succession of tanks in the dry season. At several points in the ramparts, there are prominent gates, and around these gates are shrines and important remains.

=== Payama stūpa ===
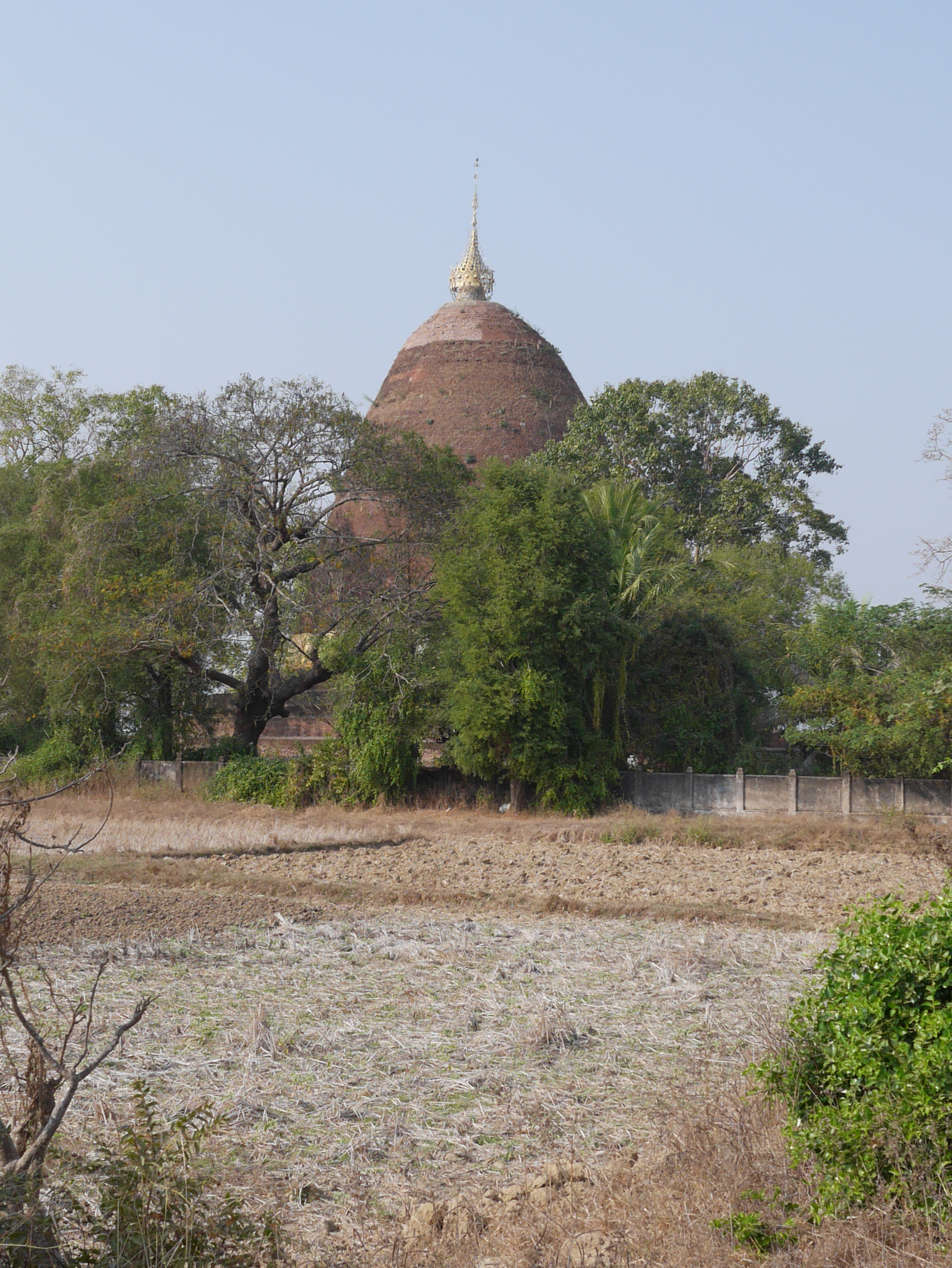
Sri Ksetra, Bago, Myanmar. Payama stūpa from the south.

The Payama stūpa is located north of the ramparts of Sri Ksetra near the village of Koneyoe (at 18°50'3"N 95°18'7"E). It is reported in the Myanmar chronicles to have been built by king Duttabaung to house relics of the Buddha. The structure is built of brick and lime mortar on four terraces. Having the conical shape characteristic of stūpas in early relief sculpture from Sri Ksetra, it is one of the first stūpas of the middle Pyu period and dates between the 4th and 7th centuries.

=== Baw Baw Gyi Paya ===
The Baw Baw Gyi Paya is an important Buddhist stūpa, located to the south of the ramparts of Sri Ksetra (at 18°47'10"N 95°17'7"E). It is a circular brick-built structure, raised on terrace to a height of approximately 46m. The shape of the stūpa is often compared to the Dhamek Stupa at Sarnath in India, with which it is likely coeval. With the fall of Sri Ksetra in the mid-ninth century, king Anawrahta opened the stūpa and removed the relic which was re-installed at this capital in Bagan. In its place, he left behind a number of signed votive tablets.

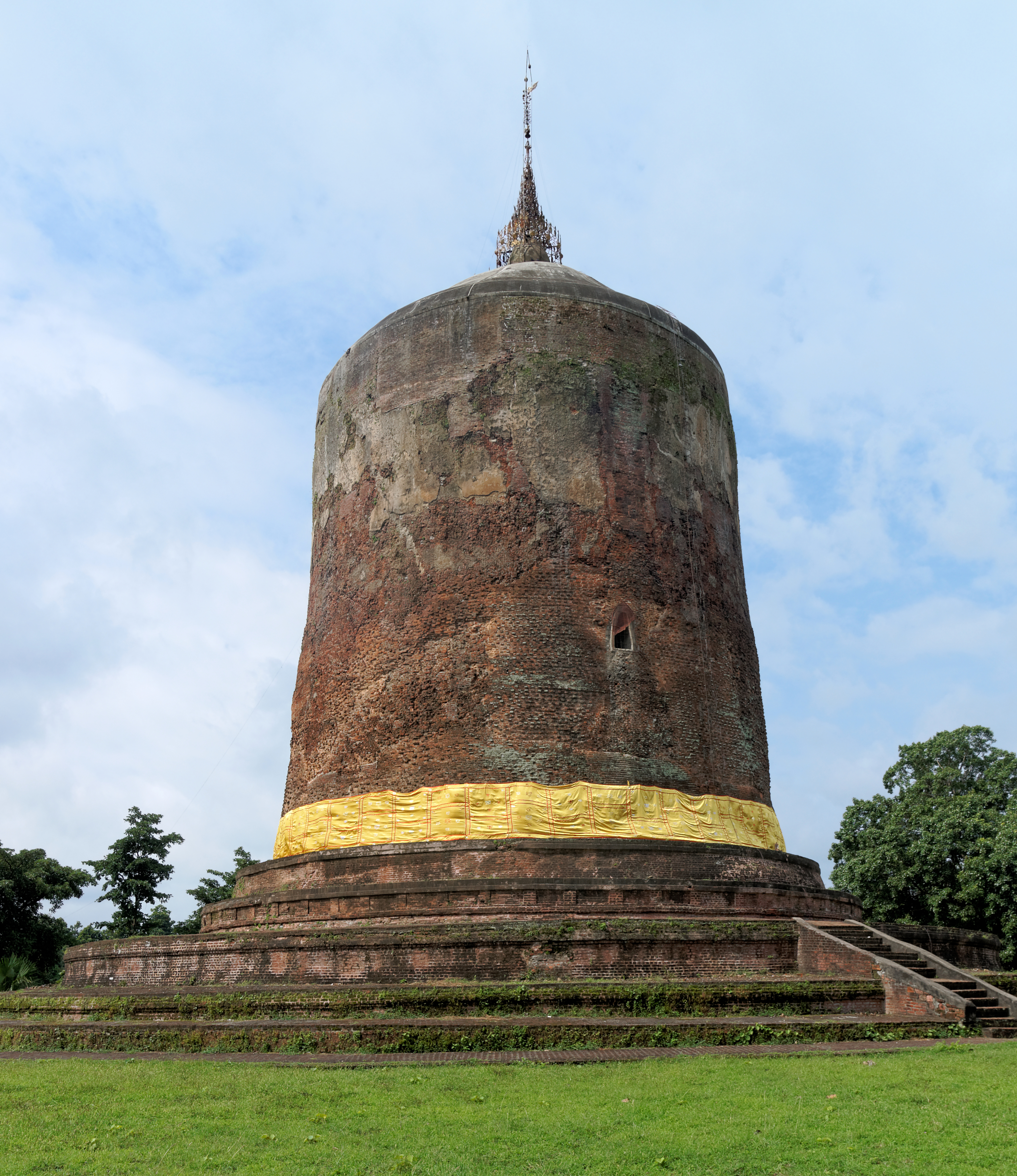
Sri Ksetra, Bago, Myanmar. Baw Baw Gyi from the northwest.

=== Payahtaung complex ===
The Payahtuang complex, numbered HMA.31 according to the Department of Archaeology, is located in the centre of Sri Ksetra near the site museum (at 18°48'25"N 95°17'33"E). The complex comprises several structures: (a) the Payahtaung temple proper, a square building of brick similar in style to some of the buildings in Bagan and dating to the circa tenth century, (b) a modern temple to the east, (c) a ruined brick stūpa, (d) the foundations of a small ruined structure and (e) an octagonal brick building that contained a massive stone urn inscribed in the Pyu language giving what appears to be a memorial record of the Pyu kings. The urn, discovered in March, 1993, is now in the National Museum of Myanmar (Yangon).

=== Khin Ba mound ===
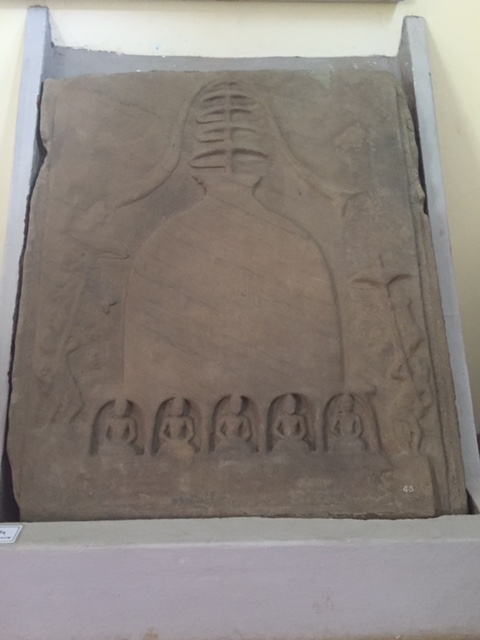
Sri Ksetra, Bago, Myanmar. Stone bas-relief of stūpa in sandstone, found in the Khin Ba mound.

The Khin Ba mound is located inside the ramparts, on the south side of the city, not far from the Tharawaddy gate and Mathe Gyagone stūpa. Located at 18°47'37"N 95°18'0"E, Khin Ba is the site of an ancient stūpa and one of the most important early archaeological sites in Sri Ksetra and Myanmar. First excavated in 1926–27, it has yielded a host of finds now on display in the Sri Ksetra Museum and the National Museum of Myanmar (Yangon). In addition to early terracotta plaques and stone reliefs, the 'great silver reliquary' was found at Khin Ba. The reliquary, inscribed in Pyu and Pali, was accompanied by a series of golden leaves carrying a Buddhist text of the sixth century. It is generally regarded as the oldest surviving example of the Pāli language.

== Art ==
Since the early twentieth century, excavations at this Pyu site have uncovered a significant amount of Pyu art, in contrast to the minimal finds at Beikthano and Halin. The objects recovered from Sri Ksetra can be dated between the fourth and the ninth centuries AD; however, difficulty in dating Pyu art has meant that most artistic remains are broadly dated within this period. An art historical study of a stele discovered at Sri Ksetra suggests a first century AD date, which would make it the earliest Pyu artwork, however, this is contested among scholars. Further scholarship has also demonstrated that the art of the Pyu draws from a range of influences, from both Indian and Southeast Asian cultures.

The artistic remains uncovered at Sri Ksetra are primarily Buddhist. However, the existence of sculpture and fragments depicting Hindu deities, most often Vishnu, suggests that Vaishnavism was practised alongside Buddhism. Remains at Sri Ksetra suggest a thriving Buddhist culture that existed in this Pyu settlement. The variety of Buddhist material includes votive tablets, stone sculptures, bronze and other precious metal sculptures, architectural fragments, and reliquary objects, as well as other artefacts including handmade beads crafted from stone, glass, terracotta and bone; rings; and silver bowls and plates. A chronology of Pyu art, demonstrating developments and characteristics of a 'Pyu' style, has not yet been established.

=== Dating Pyu art ===
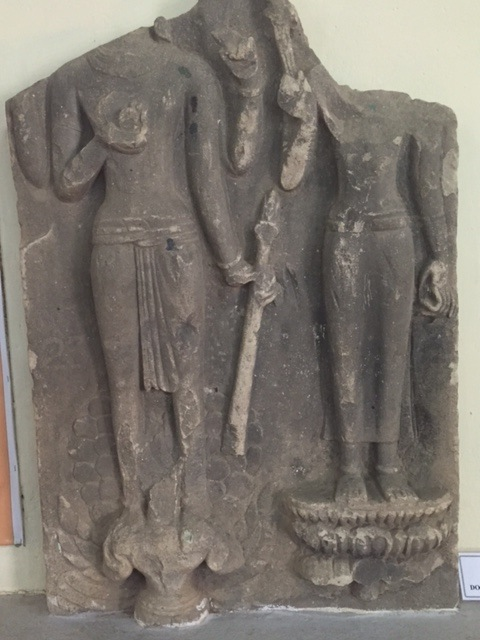
Statue of Vishnu and Lakshmi, sandstone, Pyu period, found near Hmaw Zar station

Dating Pyu art at Sri Ksetra is difficult. Studies conducted at Sri Ksetra have used a variety of methods including radio carbon dating, stylistic analysis and palaeographic studies to determine dates; however, much of the dating is still contested among scholars. A palaeographic study of a gold leaf manuscript containing Pali, recovered from the Khin Ba mound, suggests the script could be dated to the fifth century AD, much earlier then the seventh century AD date to which it had been originally attributed. This study was important in reconsidering the date for the Khin Ba mound; however, its proposed dating has not been accepted by all scholars. An argument against dating Pyu material at Sri Ksetra earlier then the seventh century AD is also based on stylistic comparison, with scholars suggesting that while an artefact may have similar attributes to those of fifth-century AD artefacts in India, fifth-century culture may have been active into the seventh century AD, which would mean that the similarities could point to this later date. Continued research needs to be undertaken at Sri Ksetra to clarify the issues surrounding dating Pyu art.

=== Influences ===
Pyu art at Sri Ksetra reveals a number of influences. The art possesses similar qualities to those of the art of Southern India (including the Gupta and post-Gupta periods), Andhra Pradesh, and Sri Lanka. Silver Buddha sculptures recovered from the relic chamber of the Khin Ba mound display stylistic features also found in Sri Lanka, including broad shoulders, shortened necks, individual hair curls, and transparent robes. While cultural influences on the Pyu are evident from Indian similarities, scholarship has also demonstrated similarities with the Mon of Burma and Dvaravati of Thailand. Buddha and stupa triads, use of megaliths, and shared imagery have been cited as demonstrating the influences of these neighbouring Southeast Asian cultures. The wide-ranging comparisons made in analysing Pyu art demonstrate the complexity of studying the art of this culture.

== See also ==
- Pyu city-states
- Tagaung kingdom
- Early Pagan kingdom
- Prome kingdom

== Bibliography ==
- Aung-Thwin, Michael (1996). "Kingdom of Bagan". In Gillian Cribbs (ed.). Myanmar Land of the Spirits. Guernsey: Co & Bear Productions. ISBN 978-0952766506.
- Aung-Thwin, Michael (2005). The mists of Rāmañña: The Legend that was Lower Burma (illustrated ed.). Honolulu: University of Hawai'i Press. ISBN 9780824828868.
- Blagden, CO (1917). "The 'Pyu' inscriptions", Journal of the Burma Research Society 7: 37 - 44.
- Brown, Robert (2001). "Pyu art: Looking East and West", Orientations 32: 35– 41.
- Charney, Michael W. (2006). Powerful Learning: Buddhist Literati and the Throne in Burma's Last Dynasty, 1752–1885. Ann Arbor: University of Michigan.
- Galloway, Charlotte (2010). "Ways of Seeing a Pyu Mon and Dvaravati Artistic Continuum". Bulletin of the Indo Pacific Prehistory Association 30: 70 – 78.
- Gutman, Pamela and Hudson, Bob (2012–13). "A First Century Stele from Sriksetra." Bulletin de l'École Française d'Extreme-Orient 99: 17–46.
- Htin Aung, Maung (1967). A History of Burma. New York and London: Cambridge University Press.
- Htin Aung, Maung (1970). Burmese History before 1287: A Defence of the Chronicles. Oxford: The Asoka Society.
- Hudson, Bob (2012). "A thousand years before Bagan: radiocarbon dates and Myanmar's ancient Pyu cities". Paper presented at Early Myanmar and its Global Connections Conference, Bagan.
- Luce, G.H. (1970). Old Burma: Early Pagan. Vol. 2. Locust Valley, NY: Artibus Asiae and New York University.
- Luce, Gordon H. (1985). Phases of Pre-Pagan: language and history. New York: Oxford University Press.
- Moore, Elizabeth (2012). The Pyu Landscape: Collected Articles. Myanmar: Department of Archaeology.
- Phayre, Lt. Gen. Sir Arthur P. (1883). History of Burma (1967 ed.). London: Susil Gupta.
- Royal Historical Commission of Burma (1832). Hmannan Yazawin (in Burmese). Vol. 1–3 (2003 ed.). Yangon: Ministry of Information, Myanmar.
- Stargardt, Janice (1995). "The Four Oldest Surviving Pali Texts: the Results of the Cambridge Symposium on the Golden Pali Text of Sri Ksetra (Burma), April 1995". Journal of the Pali Text Society XXI: 199–213.
- Tin, Pe Maung; Luce, Gordon H. (1923). The Glass Palace Chronicle of the Kings of Burma. London: Oxford University Press.
- Than Tun (1964). Studies in Burmese History (in Burmese). Vol. 1. Yangon: Maha Dagon.
- "The Great Silver Reliquary of Sri Ksetra: Where Early Epigraphy and Buddhist Art Meet," The Metropolitan Museum of Art, 35:06, posted by MET Media, 29 May 2014.
