= Min Hti of Arakan =

King of Arakan

Min Hti of Launggyet
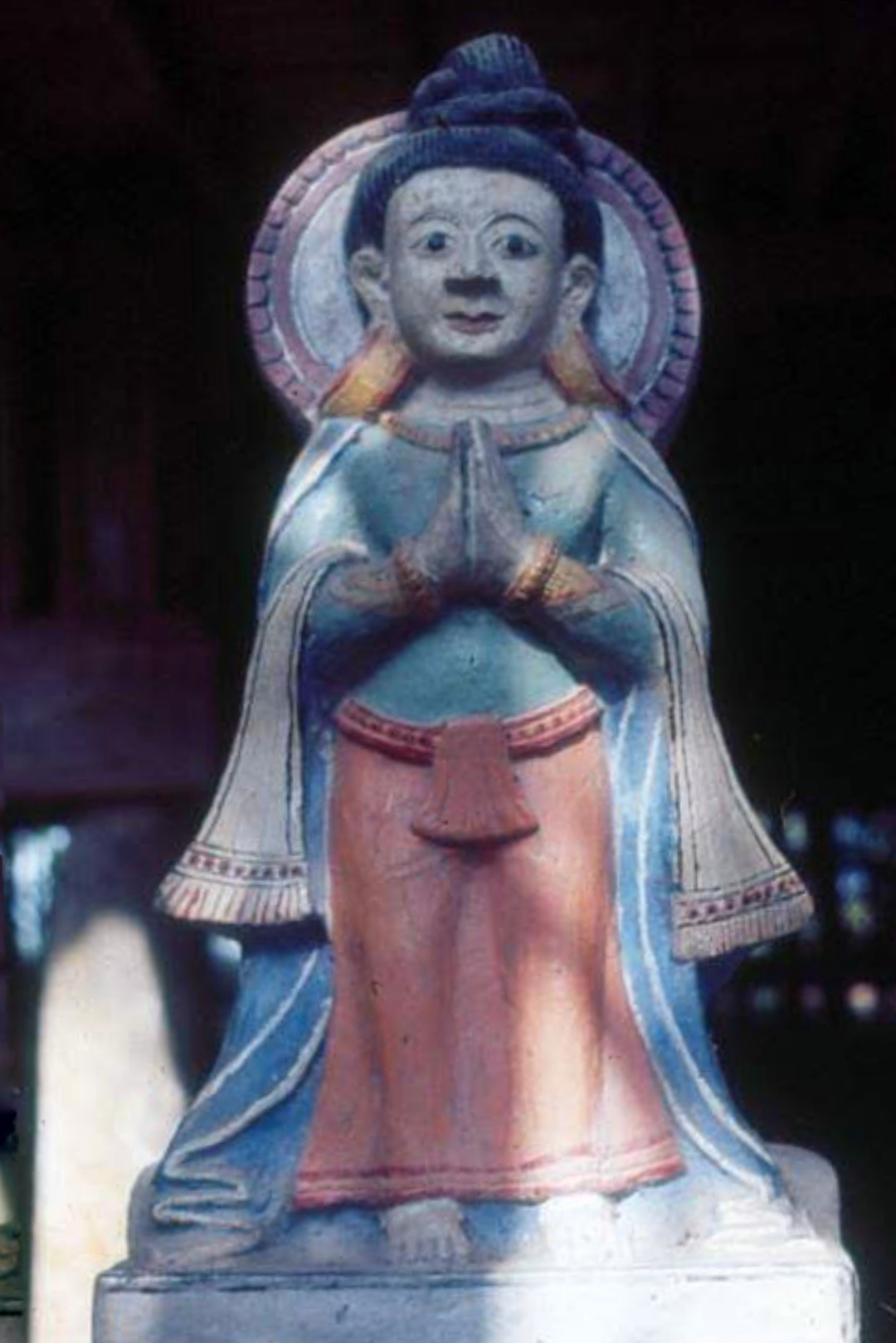
- King Min Hti, depicted as god with four fingers

King of Arakan
- Reign: c. 1279–1374
- Coronation: c. 1295
- Predecessor: Sithabin I
- Successor: Saw Mon II (or Uzana II of Launggyet)
- Born: c. 1273; Launggyet, Arakan
- Died: c. 1374 (aged around 101); Launggyet
- Consort: Saw Sit I (chief queen); Saw Pyo; Saw Nyo; Saw Thanda Phyu
- Issue: Thiwarit of Arakan; Uzana II of Arakan; Thinhse of Arakan; Saw Mar La (daughter); Saw Thamar II (daughter); Min Gahna (daughter); Saw Shwe Pwint (daughter)
Regnal name
- "Shwe Nan Thakhin Meng Mrat Meng Htee" (Prince of the Golden Palace)
Posthumous name
- လေးမြို့ခေတ် လောင်းကြက် မင်းနေပြည်တော် သျှင်ဘုရင်မင်းထီး
- House: Alawmaphyu
- Father: Min Bilu of Launggyet
- Mother: Saw Thamar I
- Religion: Therevada Buddhism

Min Hti (Arakanese: မင်းထီး; c. 1270s (Note: Various sources imply different dates of birth. Per (Sandamala Linkara 1997: 176–178, 178–182), the Arakanese chronicles Razawin Haung and Dhanyawaddy Ayedawbon suggest that he was born c. 1278/79. A non-academic source (Burma Gazeteer 1917: 22–23) implies that he was born c. 1272.) – c. 1373/74; (Note: Various sources give different dates of death. Per (Sandamala Linkara 1997: 176–178, 178–182), the Arakanese chronicles Razawin Haung and Dhanyawaddy Ayedawbon say he died in 751 ME (1389/90) while the main Burmese chronicles (Maha Yazawin Vol. 1 2006: 285–286), (Yazawin Thit Vol. 1 2012: 190), (Hmannan Vol. 1 2003: 410–411) say the king of Arakan died in 735 ME (1373/74), 15 years earlier. (Phayre 1967: 301) and (Burma Gazetteer 1917: 72) give 1385 as the date of death while (Harvey 1925: 369) gives 1374.) Minhti or Mindi) was king of Launggyet Arakan, a former state in Myanmar (Burma), from c. 1279 to c. 1374. He is best known for being claimed as the longest reigning monarch in history, although the exact length of his reign is disputed. He became king at a young age after his father Min Bilu was assassinated by Sithabin I of Arakan. According to the Arakanese chronicles, he is generally considered to have reigned for about 95 years (according to The Guinness Book of World Records). The Guinness Book of World Records, however, recognizes it as the longest "reputed" reign.

The length of Min Hti’s reign may have only been surpassed by Pepi II Neferkare, Pharaoh of Egypt (rule c. 2278–2184 BCE). He is claimed to have ruled for about 94 years according to Manetho, and 90 years according to the Turin Papyrus. Since contemporary documentary evidence dates from his 65th year of reign, the 90+ years may be doubtful. (Note: Two Japanese Emperors, Emperor Suinin (100 years) and Emperor Kōan (102 years) were claimed to have reigned longer than both, but modern scholars dispute these emperors as 'legendary'.)

== Popular tales ==
A popular folk story of King Min Hti recounts when he ordered a new palace to be built and serves as an example of his stern judiciousness. His subjects were known for chewing betel nut, which would stain their fingers. The subjects would then use the palace door posts to clean their fingers, dirtying the door post. The king ordered that everyone entering the palace must wash their hands, and anyone who broke the rule was to have the offending finger cut off. After some time the king, forgetful of his own order, wiped his finger on one of the palace door posts. One of the ministers made a careful note of it, writing down the date and hour when it occurred, but did not remove the dirt from the post. A few days later the king observed the spot on the palace door and angrily ordered his ministers to find the offender and see that he was punished. When the ministers produced the proof of the king's own guilt, the king, with his own sword, cut off his forefinger, saying 'that even a king should not issue orders for himself to break with impunity'. To commemorate the event he had Buddha sculptures erected, and instructed the sculptors to give them only four fingers on their right hands.

== Early life ==
Min Hti was born to King Min Bilu and Queen Saw. Upon hearing the prophecies regarding his son, the king ordered Min Hti to be cast into the Lemro River. The child was luckily saved by some fishermen, and was sent to a remote part of the kingdom. Min Hti was hidden in a village near the upstream of Yoe Chaung or Yoe River nearby Awmara and Lawmara Mountains Ranges: the place where located between modern day Ponnagyun Township and Kyauktaw Township Rakhine State, where he lived prior to his accession to the crown at the age of seven or nine years old.

== Reign ==
Min Hti ascended to the throne by acclamation of his father's legacy in 1279, after the usurper Sithabin I was deposed and executed by his ministers. Min Hti was nine years old, and ruled with his uncle as royal advisor.

In the year 1294, Shans invaded the Kingdom but were repelled. In subsequent years, Min Hti's dominions would be attacked by various groups, including the Shans, the Talaing, the Burmese, and the Thet tribe in the north. In response to various attacks, the king went to Mahamuni Temple, and, depositing his rosary before the idol, vowed to rid of the country of its enemies. Following this, he marched in person to repel the Talaings who had taken control of the southern town of Sandoway. His uncle, Uza-na-gyi, was sent with the army to attack Pagan. Salingathu, his brother in-law, advanced into Pegu, and the general Raza-thin-gyan was sent against the Thet tribe. All of the offensives were successful, and Raza-thin-gyan was able to secure peace through the country along the sea coast as far as the Brahmaputra River.

In the year 1327, the Pinya Kingdom attacked Ramree Island and carried away number of inhabitants. This was followed by another attack from the Shans, who attacked from the Lemro River in 1334. In retaliation, Min Hti ordered his army to cross the Arakan Mountain to raid and annex Thayet. During this campaign, the Governor Min Shin Saw of Thayet and his family were captured and brought to Launggyet. On his return from the campaign, Min Hti founded the town of Ann, lying below the Rakhine Yoma in 1334/1335. The location served as stopover in the passage through the Arakan Mountains leading to Minbu.

In his final years of Min Hti's reign, the Viceroy of Thandwe rebelled against the king. The viceroy had gained possession of a relic of Gotama brought from Ceylon, which he believed would help him become king, however the rebellion was ultimately stopped. Soon after this, King Min Hti died after a reign of 106 years. He died without a legitimate heir to the throne, and control of the kingdom fell to the Launggyet Court. Eventually, his eldest illegitimate son succeeded him.

== Administration ==
Min Hti's administration is remembered as being particularly philosophical. During the early years of his reign, as he was too young to make important political decisions, most were made by his mother, uncle, and a court of minor regents. An example of Min Hti's beliefs can be seen in his decrees. In one he is quoted as writing "If a son is to act out, his father should be investigated, if the daughter is to act out, her mother should be, if a wife is acting out, her husband, and if a student is acting out, their teacher should be judged." This type of philosophy was the defining characteristic of Min Hti's rule: he believed environmental factors contributed to the actions of others, and should not be disregarded when considering culpability.

== Family ==
The King had four consorts and three sons who later succeeded him. The origin of the Mrauk U Royal Family can be traced to King Min Hti through his son Thinhse. The founder of Mrauk U, Min Saw Mon, was the child of Razathu II, who in turn was the son of Thinhse.

=== Consorts and Issue ===
- Chief Queen Consort Saw Sit I (မိဖုရားကြီး စောစစ်), m. 1280s)
  - Eldest crown prince, future King Uzana II of Arakan (ဥစ္စနာငယ်;1315- 1387)
  - Princess Saw Mar-lar, (မင်းသမီး စောမာလာ)
  - Princess Saw Thamar, (မင်းသမီးစောမလာ)
- Queen Consort Saw Nyo, (မိဖုရားစောညို)
- Queen Consort Saw Thanda Phyu, (မိဖုရားစောသန္တာဖြူ)
  - Second crown prince, future King Thinhse of Arakan (သိဥ္စည်းမင်း;1334–1394)
  - Third crown prince, future King Thiwarit of Arakan, (သိဝရာစ်ရာဇာမင်း;1339–1390)

- Queen Consort Saw Pyo,(မိဖုရားစောပျို).
  - Princess Min Gahna, (မင်းသမီးမင်းကဏှာ).
  - Princess Saw Shwe Pyint, (မင်းသမီးစောရွှေပွင့်)

== Descendants ==
- Razathu II – grandson
- Min Saw Mon – great grandson
- Min Razagyi – 5th-generation great grandson
- Thiri Thudhamma −7th-generation great grandson

== Historiography ==
The Arakanese chronicles, Rakhine Razawin Haung, Dhanyawaddy Ayedawbon and Rakhine Razawin Thit, all say that Min Hti reigned for 106 years, although the Dhanyawaddy Ayedawbon contains inconsistent reporting. The British colonial period scholars record his reign as being from 1279 to either 1374 or 1385.

Source	Birth–Death	Age at Accession	Reign	Length of reign	Age at Death	Reference
Rakhine Razawin Haung	c. 1277/78 – 1389/90	6 (7th year)	1283/84 – 1389/90	106	112 (113th year)	(Note: (Sandmala Linkara Vol. 1 1997: 176–178): According to the Razawin Haung chronicle, Min Hti ascended the throne in 645 ME (29 March 1283 to 27 March 1284) in his 7th year (at the age of 6), reigned for 106 years, and died in his 113th year (at age 112) in 751 ME (29 March 1389 to 29 March 1390).)
Dhanyawaddy Ayedawbon	c. 1277/78 – 1389/90	8 (9th year) [sic] 6 (7th year)	1285/86 – 1389/90 (and 1283/84 – 1389/90)	106	112 (113th year)	(Note: The Dhanyawaddy is inconsistent. (Sandmala Linkara Vol. 1 1997: 178) says Min Hti became king in his 9th year (at age 8). But (Sandmala Linkara Vol. 1 1997: 182) says he became king in his 7th year (at age 6), reigned for 106 years, and died in his 113th year (at age 112) in 751 ME (29 March 1389 to 29 March 1390).)
Rakhine Razawin Thit	c. 1277/78 – 1389/90	6 (7th year)	1283/84 – 1389/90	106	112 (113th year)	(Note: (Sandmala Linkara Vol. 2 1999: 206): The author Sandamala Linkara seemed to have chosen the more internally consistent dates of Razawin Haung.)
Maha Yazawin, Yazawin Thit, Hmannan Yazawin	not reported	not reported	? – 1373/74	not reported	not reported	(Note: The main Burmese chronicles all agree that the king of Arakan died in 735 ME (29 March 1373 to 28 March 1374) but do not necessarily agree on who the king was. (Maha Yazawin Vol. 1 2006: 285–286) and (Hmannan Vol. 1 2003: 410–411): King Min Bilu of Arakan died in 735 ME, and King Swa Saw Ke placed his nominee Saw Mon on the Arakanese throne in the same year. (Yazawin Thit Vol. 1 2012: 190) gives the same story except but does not mention the name of the deceased Arakanese king.)
Arthur Purves Phayre	not reported	not reported	1279–1385	106	not reported	(Note: (Phayre 1967: 301) says Min Hti began his reign in 641 ME (29 March 1279 to 27 March 1280), ruled for 106 years, and died in 747 ME (29 March 1385 to 29 March 1386), abbreviating the common era years as 1279–1385. It is unclear where he got the 641 ME. His 641 ME and the 645 ME of the chronicles Razawin Haung and Dhanyawaddy Ayedawbon may have been a result of a copying error. The Burmese numerals ၁ (1) and ၅ (5) can easily be misconstrued or miscopied.)
G.E. Harvey	not reported	not reported	1279–1374	95	not reported	(Note: Per (Harvey 1925: 369), Harvey used Phayre's list of Arakanese monarchs as the base. Hence (Harvey 1925: 371) gives 1279 as the start of Min Hti reign but adds that the reign ended in 1374, and Burmese nominees ruled from 1374 to 1385. Harvey's 1374 seems to be based on the main Burmese chronicles' date of 735 ME (29 March 1373 to 28 March 1374). Over 75% of the 735 ME fell in the year 1373 (29 March to 31 December 1373) while less than a quarter of the year fell in 1374 CE (1 January to 28 March 1374).)

== Bibliography ==
- Harvey, G. E. (1925). History of Burma: From the Earliest Times to 10 March 1824. London: Frank Cass & Co. Ltd.
- Htin Aung, Maung (1967). A History of Burma. New York and London: Cambridge University Press.
- Kala, U (1724). Maha Yazawin (in Burmese). Vol. 1–3 (2006, 4th printing ed.). Yangon: Ya-Pyei Publishing.
- Maha Sithu (1798). Myint Swe; Kyaw Win; Thein Hlaing (eds.). Yazawin Thit (in Burmese). Vol. 1–3 (2012, 2nd printing ed.). Yangon: Ya-Pyei Publishing.
- Phayre, Lt. Gen. Sir Arthur P. (1883). History of Burma (1967 ed.). London: Susil Gupta.
- Royal Historical Commission of Burma (1832). Hmannan Yazawin (in Burmese). Vol. 1–3 (2003 ed.). Yangon: Ministry of Information, Myanmar.
- Sandamala Linkara, Ashin (1931). Rakhine Razawin Thit (in Burmese). Vol. 1–2 (1997 ed.). Yangon: Tetlan Sarpay.
- Smart, R.B., ed. (1917). Burma Gazetteer: Akyab District. Vol. A. Rangoon: Government Printing and Stationery.

Preceded by Sithabin I	King of Arakan; 1279–1374	Succeeded by Saw Mon II
