= Gavampati =

Gavampati may refer to:

- Gavampati (chronicle), a supplementary Mon language chronicle.
- Gavampati (Buddha's disciple), one of the first ten disciples of Buddha to be ordained.
