= Inwa Yazawin =

Burmese chronicle

- Original title: အင်းဝ ရာဇဝင်
- Language: Burmese
- Series: Burmese chronicles
- Genre: Chronicle, History
- Publication date: 14th–15th centuries
- Publication place: Ava Kingdom

Inwa Yazawin (Burmese: အင်းဝ ရာဇဝင်, lit. 'Chronicle of Inwa') is a lost Burmese chronicle that covers the history of the Ava Kingdom. The chronicle's existence was first mentioned in an early 15th-century chronicle called Yazawin Kyaw that did survive. At least some portions survived down to the 1720s as they were referenced in Maha Yazawin, the official chronicle of Toungoo Dynasty.

== Bibliography ==
- Hla Pe, U (1985). Burma: Literature, Historiography, Scholarship, Language, Life, and Buddhism. Singapore: Institute of Southeast Asian Studies. ISBN 9971988003.
- Kala, U (1724). Maha Yazawin Gyi (in Burmese). Vol. 1–3 (2006, 4th printing ed.). Yangon: Ya-Pyei Publishing.
