= Dhanyawaddy Ayedawbon =

Burmese chronicle

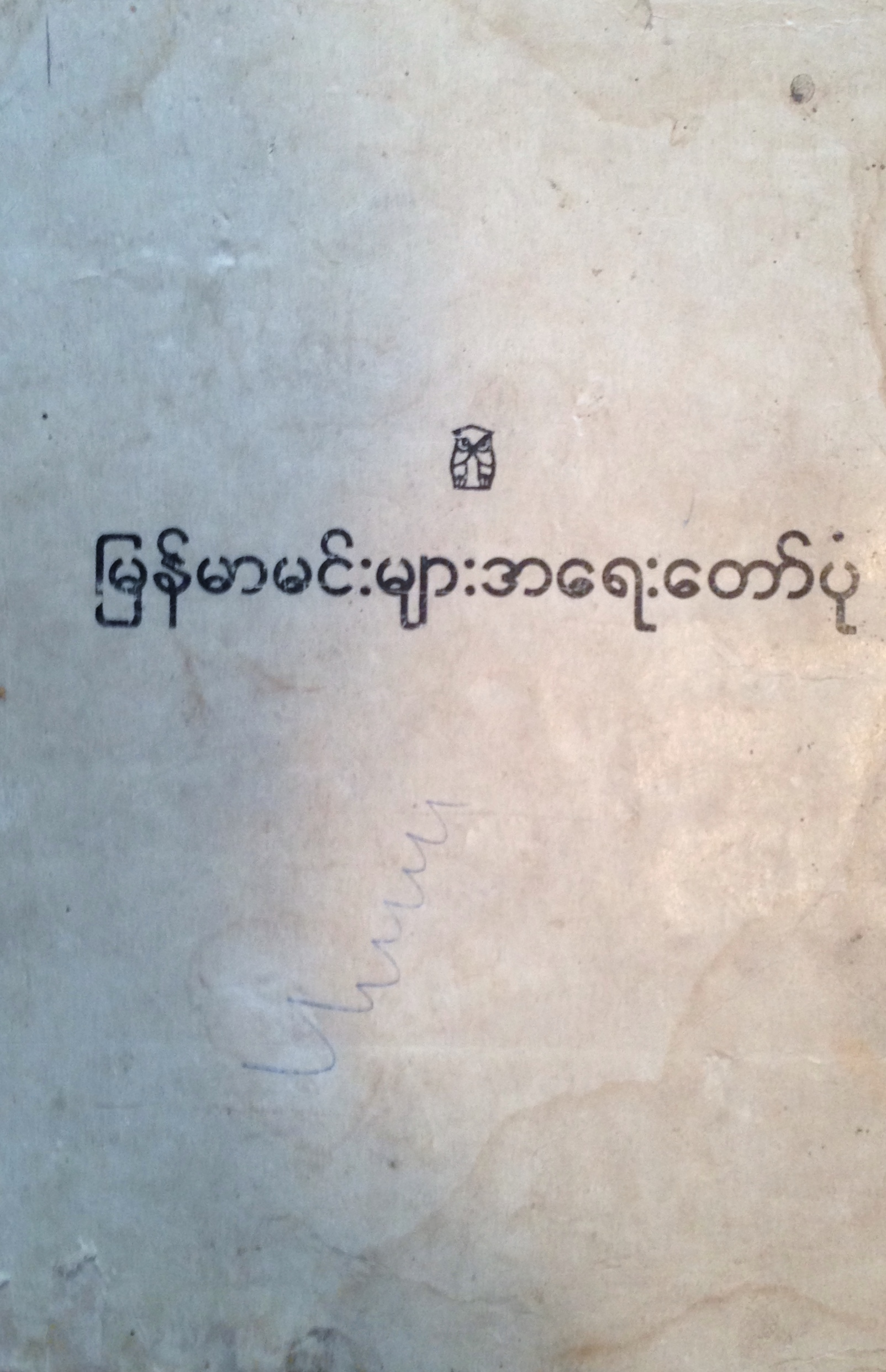
- 1967 publication of five rare Burmese chronicles (Dhanyawaddy, Razadarit, Hsinbyumyashin, Nyaungyan, Alaung Mintaya)
- Author: Rakhine Sayadaw
- Original title: ဓညဝတီ အရေးတော်ပုံ
- Language: Burmese
- Series: Arakanese chronicles
- Genre: Chronicle, History
- Publication date: 10 February 1788
- Publication place: Kingdom of Burma
- Preceded by: Min Razagri Aredaw Sadan
- Followed by: Mizzimadetha Ayedawbon

Kawitharabi Thiri-Pawara Agga-Maha-Dhammarazadiraza-Guru (Burmese: ကဝိသာရာဘိ သီရိပဝရအဂ္ဂမဟာ ဓမ္မရာဇာဓိရာဇဂုရု; Pali: Kavisārābhi Sīripavara Aggamahādhammarājādhirājaguru), commonly known as Dhanyawaddy Ayedawbon (Burmese: ဓညဝတီ အရေးတော်ပုံ) is a Burmese chronicle covering the history of Arakan from time immemorial to Konbaung Dynasty's annexation of Mrauk-U Kingdom in 1785. It was written soon after the annexation to salvage Arakanese history after most of Mrauk-U's historical records were burned down by Konbaung forces in 1785. Rakhine Sayadaw, a Buddhist monk, tried to piece together the portions that escaped the indiscriminate destruction, and completed it in 1788. According to G.E. Harvey, a British colonial period historian, the chronicle may not be as reliable as it is "a third-hand piece of work".

The chronicle covers from c. 825 BCE from the reign of legendary King Kanyaza Gyi to the Konbaung annexation in 1785. Like most Arakanese chronicles, this chronicle provides a short account of legendary kings, and starts a more detailed coverage with King Sanda Thuriya (146–198). It also contains many homilies and wise counsels on good governance given to various kings by wise men and ministers. It provides the most detailed accounts, starting with King Pa-Gyi (Min Bin) to the last king of Arakan, Maha Thammada.

== Bibliography ==
- Harvey, G. E. (1925). History of Burma: From the Earliest Times to 10 March 1824. London: Frank Cass & Co. Ltd.
- Myint-U, Thant (2006). The River of Lost Footsteps—Histories of Burma. Farrar, Straus and Giroux. ISBN 978-0-374-16342-6.
- Thaw Kaung, U (2010). Aspects of Myanmar History and Culture. Yangon: Gangaw Myaing.
