= Hanthawaddy Hsinbyushin Ayedawbon =

16th-century Burmese chronicle

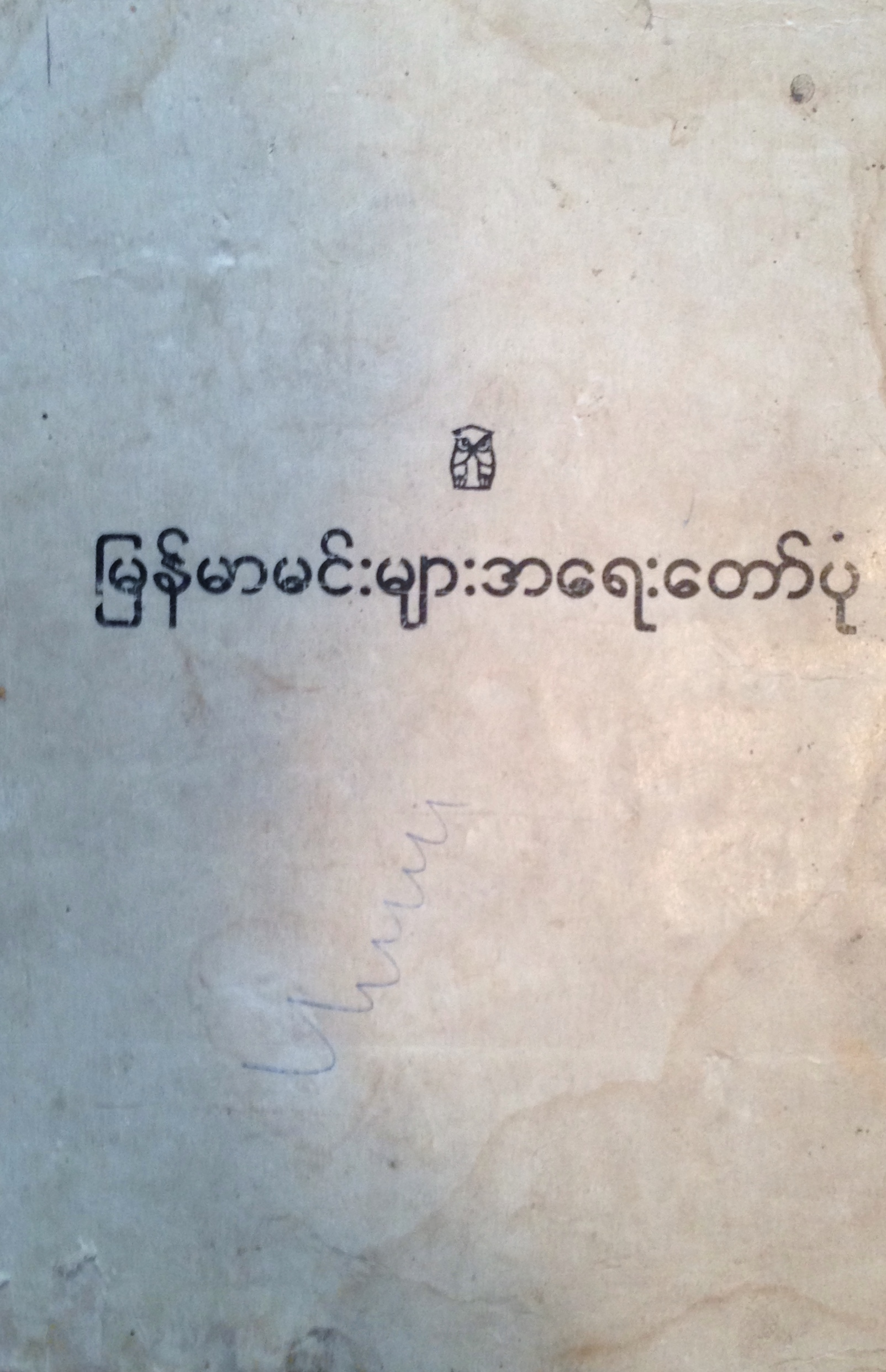
- 1967 publication of five rare Burmese chronicles (Dhanyawaddy, Razadarit, Hsinbyumyashin, Nyaungyan, Alaung Mintaya)
- Author: Yazataman
- Original title: ဟံသာဝတီ ဆင်ဖြူရှင် အရေးတော်ပုံ
- Language: Burmese
- Series: Burmese chronicles
- Genre: Chronicle, History
- Publication date: 1579
- Publication place: Kingdom of Burma

Hanthawaddy Hsinbyushin Ayedawbon (Burmese: ဟံသာဝတီ ဆင်ဖြူရှင် အရေးတော်ပုံ) is a 16th-century Burmese chronicle of King Bayinnaung of Toungoo Dynasty. Though it is a biographic chronicle, it is a detailed account of the reign. The detailed coverage begins in 1550, right after the death of King Tabinshwehti, and ends in 1579, two years before the end of the reign.

The chronicle was commissioned by the king's eldest son Nanda and brothers Minkhaung II of Toungoo, Thado Dhamma Yaza II of Prome and Thado Minsaw of Ava in 1564. It was compiled by Yazataman, a senior minister at Bayinnaung's court. He was a cavalry regiment commander, and served in several military campaigns under kings Tabinshwehti and Bayinnaung. He also served at Bayinnaung's successor Nanda's court.

The author mentions that he compiled the chronicle using contemporary sources and some inscriptions, and that he considered 235 records of notable events that took place during the reign and selected 35 major events from the list. Most of the selected events are military campaigns, and are covered in detail. A few non-military events covered are the building of a new palace and a new royal capital, the construction of four pagodas in the four corners of the capital Pegu, and the conferring of the kingship of Lan Na to his son Nawrahta Minsaw. It also provides accounts of the king's efforts to propagate Theravada Buddhism, the construction and repairing of pagodas, the banning of animal and human sacrifices in the new conquered Shan States, and the standardization of weights and measures in his empire.

The oldest extant palm-leaf manuscript copy of the original, copied on 4 January 1672 (5th waxing of Pyatho 1033 ME), is stored at the Universities Historical Research Center in Yangon. The next oldest copy is a mimeographed copy made in 1839 of an existing manuscript.

== Bibliography ==
- Thaw Kaung, U (2010). Aspects of Myanmar History and Culture. Yangon: Gangaw Myaing.
