= Nyaungyan Mintaya Ayedawbon =

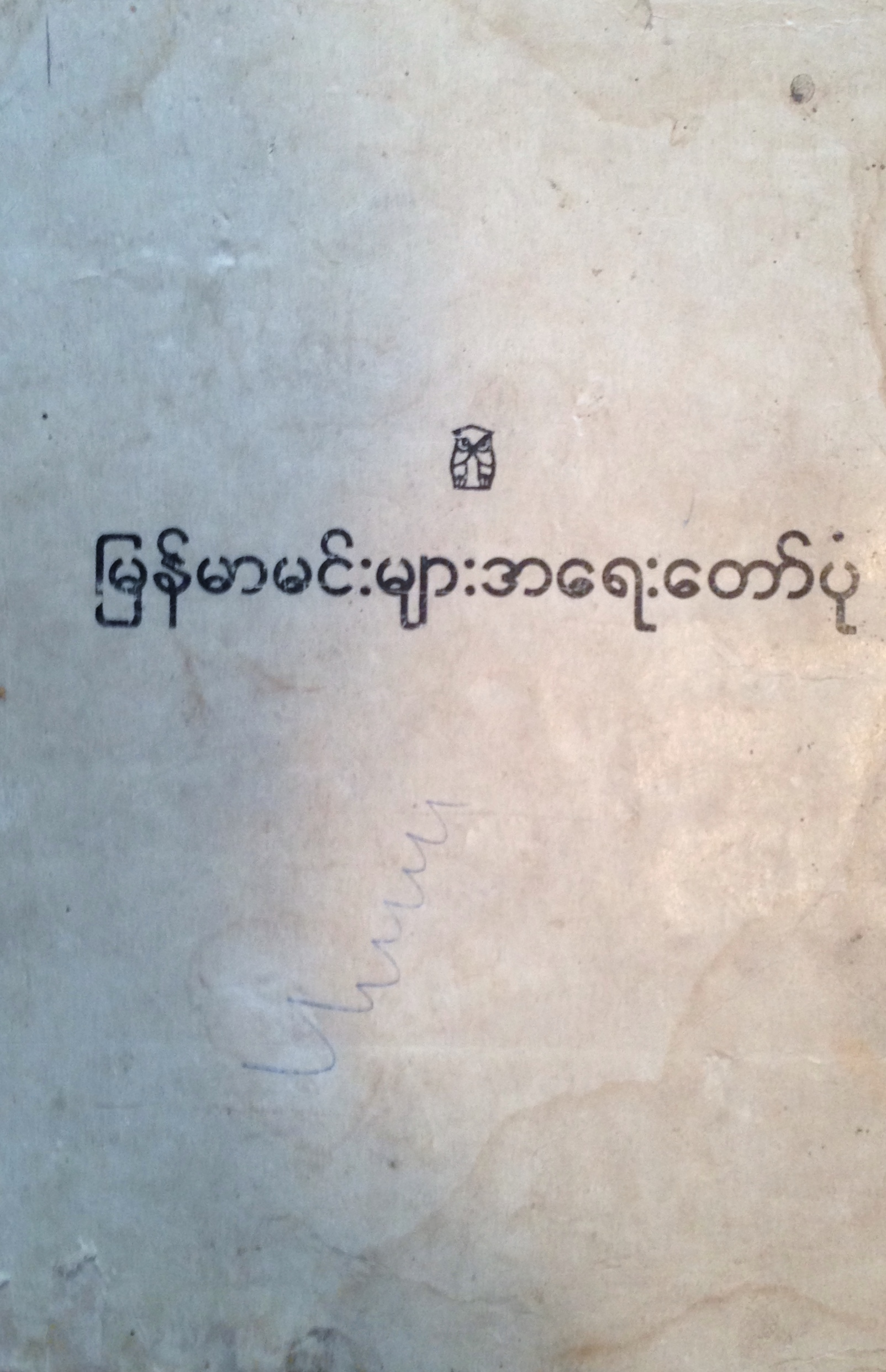
- 1967 publication of five rare Burmese chronicles (Dhanyawaddy, Razadarit, Hsinbyumyashin, Nyaungyan, Alaung Mintaya)
- Author: Maha Atula Dammikayaza or Letwe Nawrahta
- Original title: ညောင်ရမ်း မင်းတရား အရေးတော်ပုံ
- Language: Burmese
- Series: Burmese chronicles
- Genre: Chronicle, History
- Publication date: 1770s
- Publication place: Kingdom of Burma

Nyaungyan Mintaya Ayedawbon (Burmese: ညောင်ရမ်း မင်းတရား အရေးတော်ပုံ) is an 18th-century Burmese chronicle of King Nyaungyan (r. 1599–1605) of the Toungoo dynasty.

The chronicle was written by an early Konbaung period writer, believed to be either Maha Atula Dammikayaza or Letwe Nawrahta. According to scholarship, it is a compilation of two earlier works: Minye Deibba Eigyin, a chronicle in verse written by Shin Than Kho in 1608, and Maha Yazawin, the standard chronicle of the Toungoo dynasty written in 1724.

== Bibliography ==
- Thaw Kaung, U (2010). Aspects of Myanmar History and Culture. Yangon: Gangaw Myaing.
