= Pagan Yazawin =

- Original title: ပုဂံ ရာဇဝင်
- Language: Burmese
- Series: Burmese chronicles
- Genre: Chronicle, History
- Publication date: 16th century
- Publication place: Kingdom of Burma

Pagan Yazawin (Burmese: ပုဂံ ရာဇဝင်; also known as Pagan Yazawin Haung (lit. 'Old Chronicle of Pagan') is a 16th-century Burmese chronicle that covers the history of the Pagan Dynasty. One palm-leaf manuscript copy of the chronicle is stored at the Universities Historical Research Center in Yangon.

== Bibliography ==
- Goh, Geok Yian (2009). "Myanmar's Relations with China from Tagaung through Hanthawati-Taungngu Periods". In Ho Khai Leong (ed.). Connecting & Distancing: Southeast Asia and China. Institute of Southeast Asian Studies. ISBN 9789812308566.
- Lieberman, Victor B. (September 1986). "How Reliable Is U Kala's Burmese Chronicle? Some New Comparisons". Journal of Southeast Asian Studies. XVII (2). Cambridge University Press: 236–255. doi:10.1017/s002246340000103x.
