= Nidana Arambhakatha =

Nidāna Ārambhakathā
- Language: Mon
- Series: Burmese chronicles
- Genre: Chronicle, History
- Publication date: c. 1538 to 17th century
- Publication place: Ramanya

Nidāna Ārambhakathā (Burmese: နိဒါန အာရမ္ဘကထာ; lit. 'Preface to the Legend') is a Mon language chronicle. It is supposedly part of a larger treatise called Ramann'-uppatti-dipaka ("An Explanation of the Origins of Ramannadesa"). The surviving copy of Nidana is dated to the 18th century although the copy says its original manuscript was compiled in year 900 ME (1538/39 CE). Moreover, at least some parts of it were likely written during the early 17th century.

== Bibliography ==
- Aung-Thwin, Michael A. (2005). The Mists of Rāmañña: The Legend that was Lower Burma (illustrated ed.). Honolulu: University of Hawai'i Press. ISBN 9780824828868.
- Wade, Geoff (2012). "Southeast Asian Historical Writing". In José Rabasa; Masayuki Sato; Edoardo Tortarolo; Daniel Woolf (eds.). The Oxford History of Historical Writing: Volume 3: 1400-1800. Vol. 3 (illustrated ed.). Oxford University Press. p. 752. ISBN 9780199219179.
- Shorto, Harry L. Nidana Ramadhipati-katha. Unpublished typescript translation of pp. 34-44, 61-264 of Phra Candakanto (editor). On binding Rajawamsa Dhammaceti Mahapitakadhara. Pak Lat, Siam (1912). No Date
- Shorto, Harry L. (1961). ""A Mon Genealogy of Kings: Observations on the Nidana Arambhakatha," In In D. G. E. Hall (ed.). Historians of South-East Asia". London: Oxford University Press.
