= Inzauk Razawin =

Burmese chronicle

- Original title: အင်းစောက် ရာဇဝင်
- Language: Burmese
- Series: Burmese chronicles
- Genre: Chronicle, History
- Publication place: Arakan

Inzauk Razawin (Burmese: အင်းစောက် ရာဇဝင်) is an Arakanese (Rakhine) chronicle covering the history of Arakan.

== Bibliography ==
- Sandamala Linkara, Ashin (1931). Rakhine Razawin Thit (in Burmese). Vol. 1–2 (1997–1999 ed.). Yangon: Tetlan Sarpay.
