= Pyay Yazawin =

Chronicle from Myanmar, giving an account of the Prome Kingdom

- Original title: ပြည် ရာဇဝင်
- Language: Burmese
- Series: Burmese chronicles
- Genre: Chronicle, History
- Publication date: 16th century
- Publication place: Kingdom of Burma

Pyay Yazawin (Burmese: ပြည် ရာဇဝင်, lit. 'Chronicle of Pyay (Prome)') is a lost Burmese chronicle that covers the history of Pyay (Prome), including that of Prome Kingdom from 1278 to 1542. It was referenced in the later chronicles of Maha Yazawin and Hmannan Yazawin.

== See also ==
- List of rulers of Prome

== Bibliography ==
- Royal Historical Commission of Burma (1829–1832). Hmannan Yazawin (in Burmese). Vol. 1–3 (2003 ed.). Yangon: Ministry of Information, Myanmar.
