= Maha Razawin =

- Original title: မဟာ ရာဇဝင်
- Language: Burmese
- Series: Burmese chronicles
- Genre: Chronicle, History
- Publication place: Arakan
- Pages: 1,776 palm-leaves

Maha Razawin (Burmese: မဟာ ရာဇဝင်), is an Arakanese (Rakhine) chronicle covering the history of Arakan. The surviving portions of the chronicle consist of 148 palm-leaf manuscript bundles (1,776 palm-leaves).

== Bibliography ==
- Harvey, G. E. (1925). History of Burma: From the Earliest Times to 10 March 1824. London: Frank Cass & Co. Ltd.
