= Dawei Yazawin =

- Original title: ထားဝယ် ရာဇဝင်
- Language: Burmese
- Series: Burmese chronicles
- Genre: Chronicle, History
- Publication date: 1795
- Publication place: Kingdom of Burma

Dawei Yazawin (Burmese: ထားဝယ် ရာဇဝင်) is an 18th-century Burmese chronicle that covers the history of Dawei (Tavoy) region. It was written in 1795, three decades after Burma regained the region from Siam.

== Bibliography ==
- Charney, Michael W. (25 July 2002). "Living Bibliography of Burma Studies: The Primary Sources" (PDF). London: SOAS.
