= Myauk Nan Kyaung Yazawin =

- Author: Myauk Nan Kyaung Sayadaw
- Original title: မြောက်‌နန်းကျောင်း ရာဇဝင်
- Language: Burmese
- Series: Burmese chronicles
- Genre: Chronicle, History
- Publication date: 1660s
- Publication place: Kingdom of Burma

Myauk Nan Kyaung Yazawin (Burmese: မြောက်‌နန်းကျောင်း ရာဇဝင်; lit. 'Chronicle of the Northern Royal Monastery') is a 17th-century Burmese chronicle commissioned by King Pye (r. 1661–1671) and written by Myauk Nan Kyaung Sayadaw, a Buddhist monk. It is an abridged history of Burmese kings to the era.

== Bibliography ==
- Royal Historical Commission of Burma (1829–1832). Hmannan Yazawin (in Burmese). Vol. 1–3 (2003 ed.). Yangon: Ministry of Information, Myanmar.
