= Pawtugi Yazawin =

- Author: Father Ignacio de Brito and Johannes Moses (Baba Sheen)
- Original title: ပေါ်တူဂီ ရာဇဝင်
- Language: Burmese
- Series: Burmese chronicles
- Genre: Chronicle, History
- Publication date: early 19th century
- Publication place: Kingdom of Burma

Pawtugi Yazawin (Burmese: ပေါ်တူဂီ ရာဇဝင်) is a Burmese chronicle that covers the history of the Portuguese, especially their rule at Syriam (Thanlyin) from 1599 to 1613. The oral history was first compiled in the early 19th century by Father Ignacio de Brito and Johannes Moses (Baba Sheen). (Note: (Harvey 1925: xvi–xvii) speculates that the chronicle was "probably within a generation of De Brito's death (1613).") It was first published in 1918 in Yangon.

It is the first and only chronicle to claim that Natshinnaung converted to Roman Catholicism.

== Bibliography ==
- Harvey, G. E. (1925). History of Burma: From the Earliest Times to 10 March 1824. London: Frank Cass & Co. Ltd.
- Than Htut, U; U Thaw Kaung (2003). "Myanmar Historical Fiction and Their Historical Context" (PDF). Manusya: Journal of Humanities (3). Bangkok: Chulalongkorn University.
