= Myeik Yazawin =

Chronicle of the city of Myeik, Tanintharyi Region, Myanmar

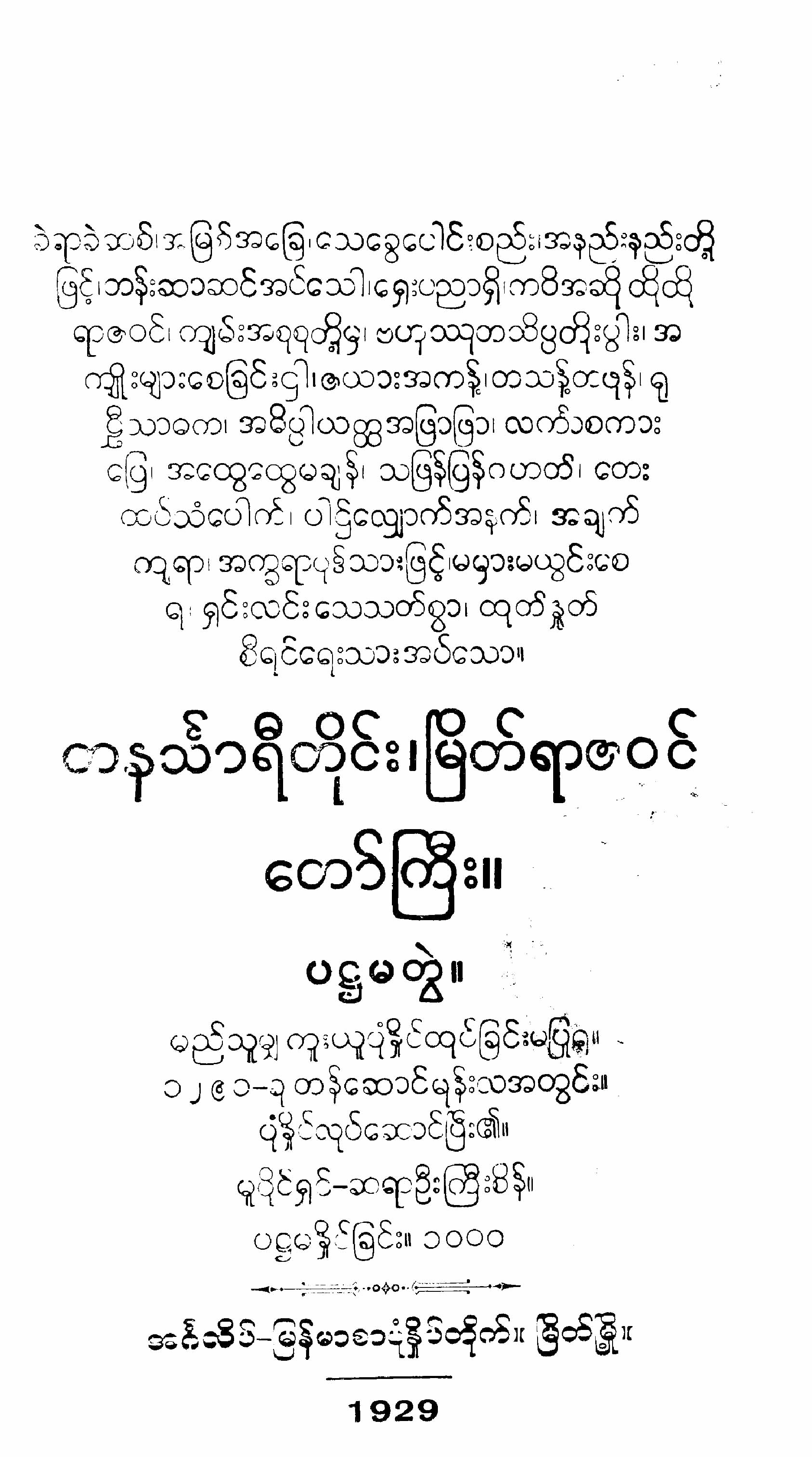
- Front cover of Myeik Yazawin
- Original title: မြိတ် ရာဇဝင်
- Translator: J.S. Furnivall
- Language: Burmese
- Series: Burmese chronicles
- Genre: Chronicle, History
- Publication date: 1795
- Publication place: Kingdom of Burma

Myeik Yazawin (Burmese: မြိတ် ရာဇဝင်) is an 18th-century Burmese chronicle that covers the history of Myeik region. It was written three decades after the Burmese annexation of the region from Siam. It has been translated into English by J.S. Furnivall.

== Bibliography ==
- Charney, Michael W. (25 July 2002). "Living Bibliography of Burma Studies: The Primary Sources" (PDF). London: SOAS.
