= Maha Razawin (Saya Me) =

- Original title: မဟာ ရာဇဝင်
- Language: Burmese
- Series: Burmese chronicles
- Genre: Chronicle, History
- Publication date: c. 1840
- Publication place: Arakan
- Pages: 288 palm-leaves

Saya Me's Maha Razawin (Burmese: ဆရာမည်၏ မဟာရာဇဝင်), is an Arakanese (Rakhine) chronicle covering the history of Arakan. The surviving portions of the chronicle consist of 24 palm-leaf manuscript bundles (288 palm-leaves).

== Bibliography ==
- Harvey, G. E. (1925). History of Burma: From the Earliest Times to 10 March 1824. London: Frank Cass & Co. Ltd.
