= Mizzimadetha Ayedawbon =

- Author: Ne Myo Zeya Kyawhtin
- Original title: မဇ္ဈိမဒေသ အရေးတော်ပုံ
- Language: Burmese
- Series: Arakanese chronicles
- Genre: Chronicle, History
- Publication date: 17 November 1823
- Publication place: Kingdom of Burma
- Preceded by: Dhanyawaddy Ayedawbon
- Followed by: Maha Razawin (Saya Mi)

Mizzimadetha Ayedawbon (Burmese: မဇ္ဈိမဒေသ အရေးတော်ပုံ) is a Burmese chronicle covering the history of Arakan after Konbaung Dynasty's annexation of Mrauk-U Kingdom from 1785 to 1816. It was written in 1823 by Ne Myo Zeya Kyawhtin, the Konbaung governor of Sandoway (Thandwe), who was born to a Rakhine (Arakanese) father and a Bamar (Burman) mother of Ava royalty.

The chronicle consists of three sections. Section I covers the Arakanese/Rakhine resistance from 1785 to 1795, and how it was crushed. Section II covers Chin Byan's rebellion from 1798 to 1811. Part III covers the mission sent by King Bodawpaya to India to collect ancient religious manuscripts as well as to collect intelligence on the British expansion in India. It includes royal orders of Bodawpaya in connection with the mission, records about an Indian princess and her retinue sent to the king, and a royal order to widen the road between Thandwe and Pyay.

Historian Yi Yi does not consider this a full-fledged chronicle, pointing out that the author himself had termed it sadan (treatise).

== Bibliography ==
- Thaw Kaung, U (2010). Aspects of Myanmar History and Culture. Yangon: Gangaw Myaing.
