= Burmese chronicles =

Royal chronicles in Myanmar

The royal chronicles of Myanmar (Burmese: မြန်မာ ရာဇဝင် ကျမ်းများ [mjəmà jàzəwɪ̀ɰ̃ tɕáɰ̃ mjá]; also known as Burmese chronicles) are detailed and continuous chronicles of the monarchy of Myanmar (Burma). The chronicles were written on different media such as parabaik paper, palm leaf, and stone; they were composed in different literary styles such as prose, verse, and chronograms. Palm-leaf manuscripts written in prose are those that are commonly referred to as the chronicles. Other royal records include administrative treatises and precedents, legal treatises and precedents, and censuses.

The chronicle tradition was maintained in the country's four historical polities: Upper Burma, Lower Burma, Arakan and the Shan states. The majority of the chronicles did not survive the country's numerous wars as well as the test of time. The most complete extant chronicles are those of Upper Burma-based dynasties, with the earliest extant chronicle dating from the 1280s and the first standard national chronicle from the 1720s.

The subject matter of the chronicles is mainly about the monarchs, and the chronicles provide little information about the general situation of the kingdom. Nor were they written solely from a secular history perspective but rather at times to provide "legitimation according to religious criteria" of the monarchy. Nevertheless, the chronicles' "great record of substantially accurate dates" goes back at least to the 11th century. Latest research shows that even the pre-11th century narratives, dominated by legends, do provide a substantially accurate record of "social memory", going back over three millennia.

Myanmar possesses the most extensive historical source material in Southeast Asia, and the Burmese chronicles are the most detailed historical records in the region. Yet much of the extant Burmese records have not been properly maintained, and many of the less well-known chronicles are yet to be studied systematically.

== Overview ==
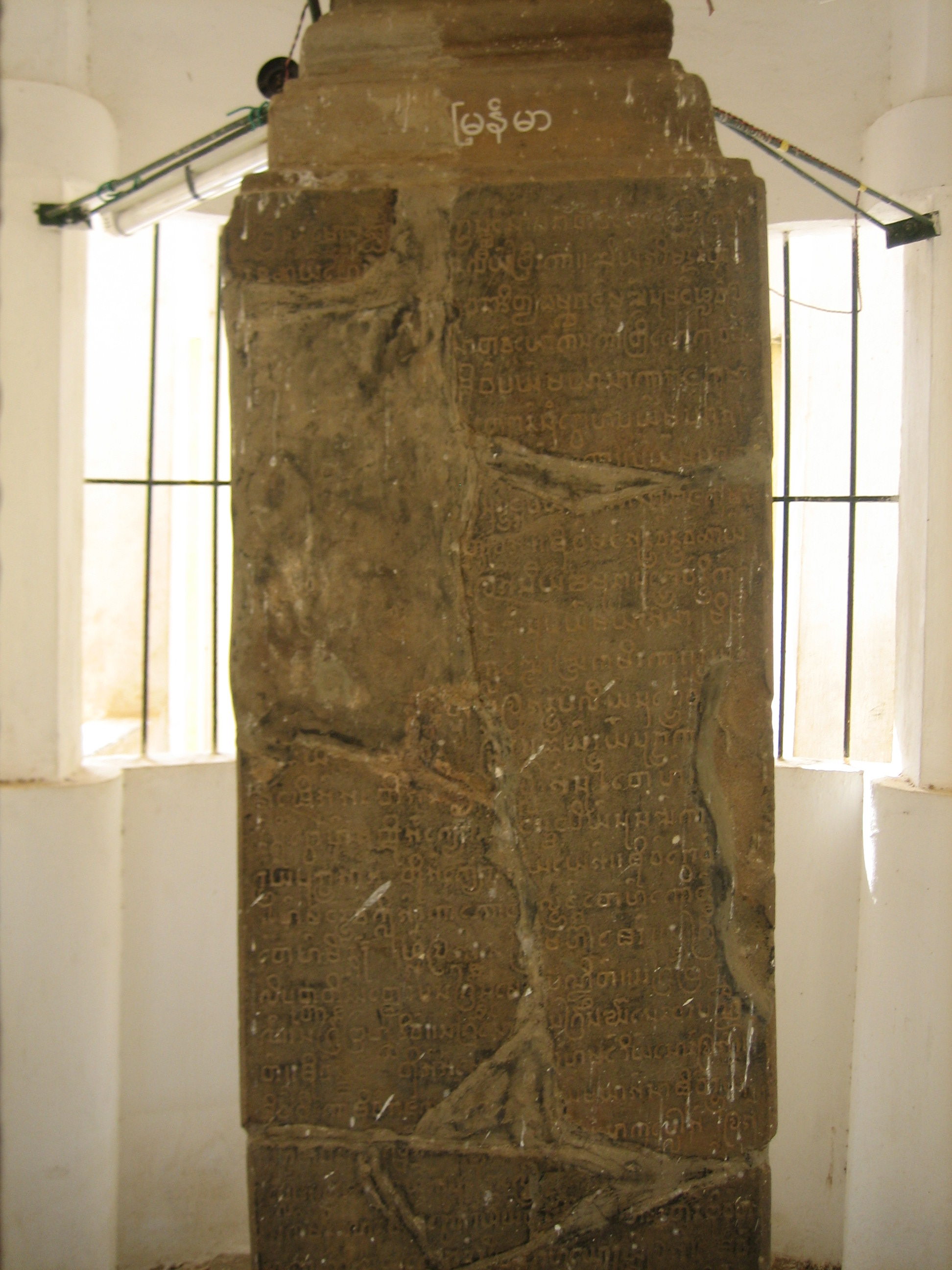
Myazedi Inscription in Burmese

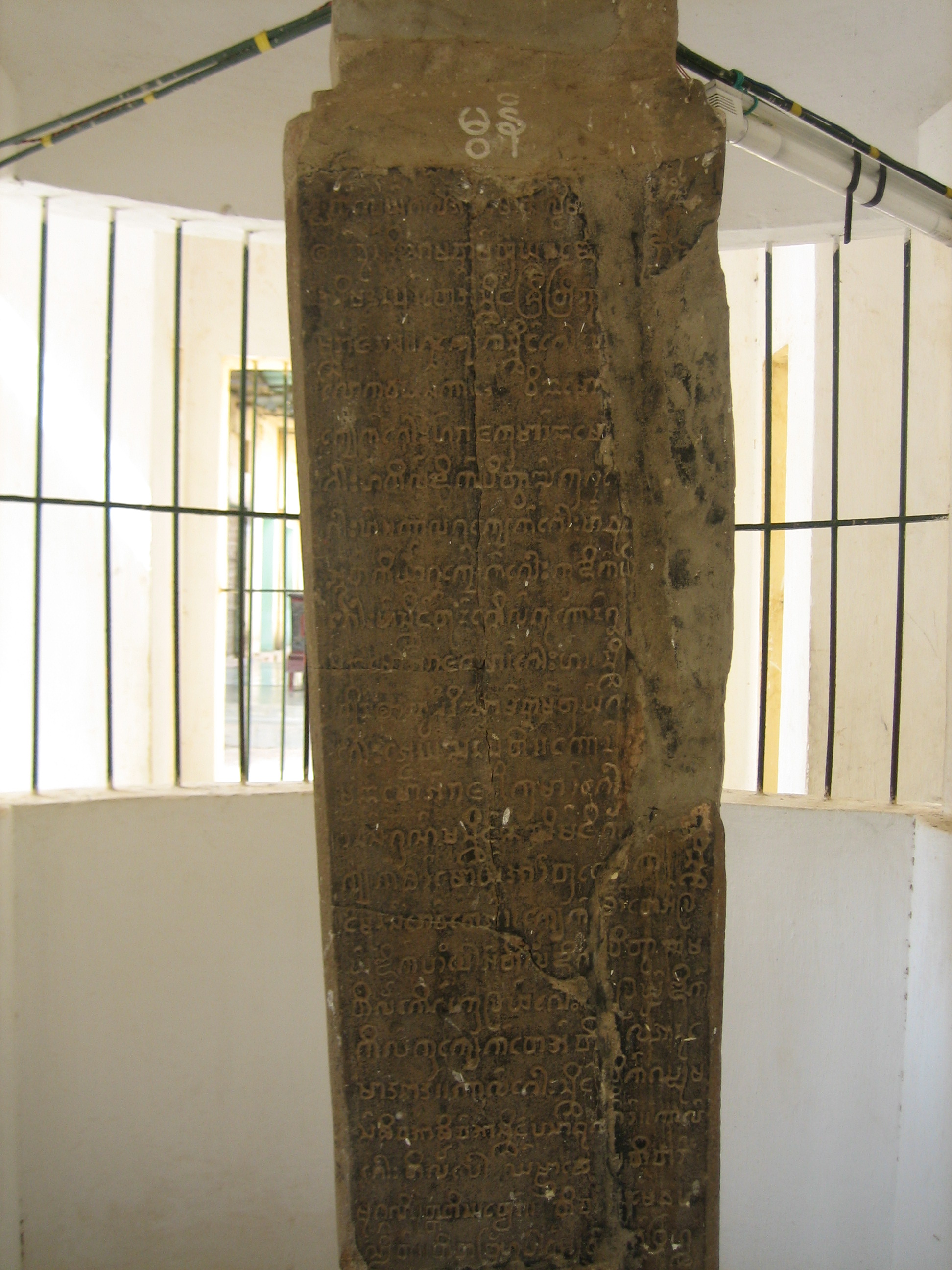
in Mon

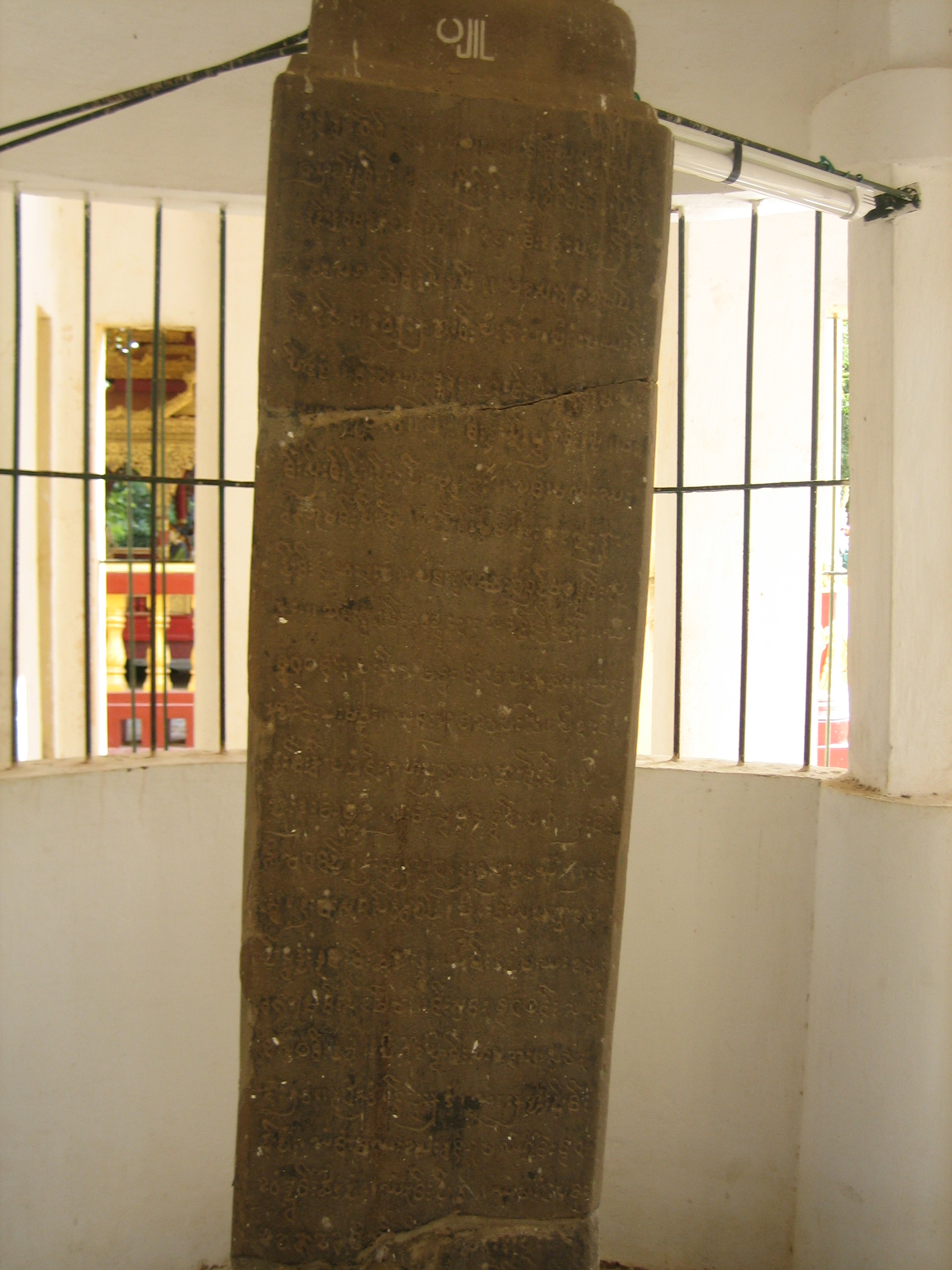
in Pyu

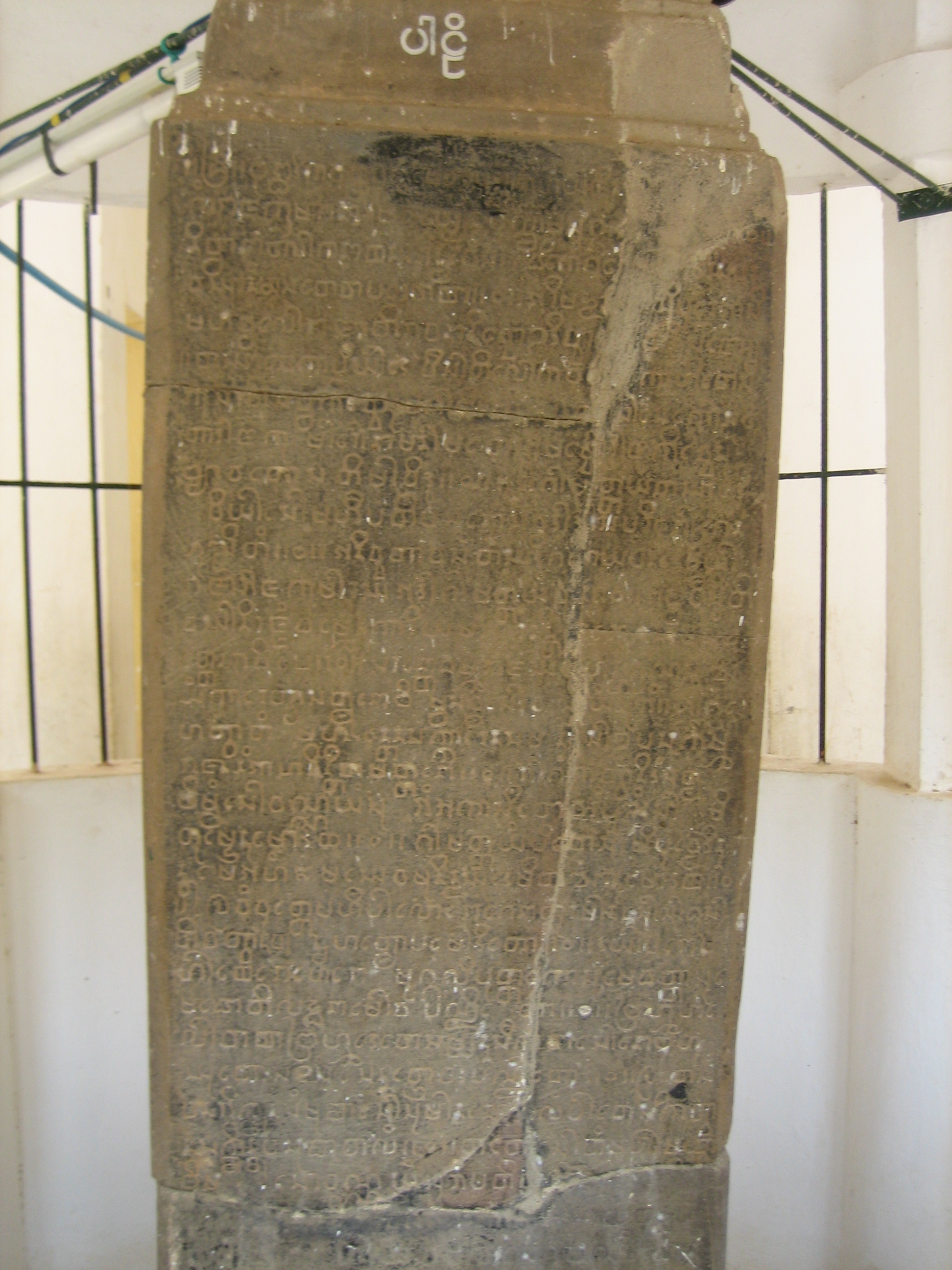
in Pali

The Burmese royal chronicles are "detailed and continuous registers of events in chronological order", revolving "chiefly around the Burmese kings". The chronicles by themselves offer little or no commentary on the situation of the kingdom of the regular people inside or outside the capital unless the king happened to be involved in the event. Other royal records such as legal treatises and precedents (dhammathats (ဓမ္မသတ်)) and censuses (sittans (စစ်တန်း)) and the chronicles of regional courts as well as temple histories (thamaings (သမိုင်း)) need to be consulted to get a glimpse of the life outside the palace.

The royal records were written on different media and in different literary styles. They can be inscriptions on stone (ကျောက်စာ) and bells (ခေါင်းလောင်းစာ), or more commonly, they were written on palm-leaf manuscripts (ပေစာ) and on special thick sheets of paper called parabaiks (ပုရပိုက်). (Note: (Raghavan 1979: 6): Parabaiks are thick sheets of paper that are blackened, glued and folded together. In general, parabaiks contain non-religious matter such as medicine, mathematics, astronomy, astrology, history, social and economic matters, poetry, etc., and are much more important to the study of Burmese history.) They also came in different literary styles: in prose (yazawins (ရာဇဝင် and ayedawbons (အရေးတော်ပုံ); in verse (eigyins (ဧချင်း) and mawguns (မော်ကွန်း)); and as chronograms (yazawin thanbauk (ရာဇဝင် သံပေါက်)).

The prose versions are those most commonly referred to as the chronicles. In general, Yazawins ("chronicle of kings" from Pali rāja-vaṃsa) are a record of events in chronological order of kings organised by dynasties whereas ayedawbons ("memoirs of royal events/struggles") are more detailed records of more celebrated kings. These definitions are loose generalisations: some ayedawbons are full-fledged chronicles of several kings (e.g., Razadarit Ayedawbon) or even dynasties (e.g., Dhanyawaddy Ayedawbon) while some yazawins such as Zatadawbon Yazawin and Yazawin Kyaw have narrower scopes. (Note: (Aung-Thwin 2005: 121–124): Zatadawbon covers regnal dates of kings from Pagan to Konbaung periods while Yazawin Kyaw covers religious history.)

== Inscriptions ==
Inscriptions, most of which were set up by the kings, the royal families and their court officials as well as wealthy families, are the earliest surviving royal records. Most surviving inscriptions are from religious dedications, and contain valuable historical material; indeed, they represent the primary extant historical record down to the 16th century.

Inscriptions are considered most accurate of all Burmese historiographic material because they are less susceptible to copying errors due to their longevity. A typical stone inscription lasts many centuries while the average life of a palm leaf record is only 100 to 150 years. Though some stone inscriptions too were recast, and some copying errors (mostly in spelling) have been identified, they do not show the same degree of copying errors of palm-leaf records, many of which were recopied many times over. The oldest extant inscriptions in Burma are dated to the 3rd and 2nd centuries BCE in Pyu city-states. Inscriptions were still "rare in the 5th to the 10th centuries but from the 11th, there is literally a deluge of them". The earliest original inscription in Burmese is dated 1035 CE; an 18th-century recast stone inscription points to 984 CE.

Inscriptions have been invaluable in verifying the events described in the chronicles written centuries later. The Myazedi inscription (1112), for example, confirmed the reign dates of kings Anawrahta to Kyansittha given in Zatadawbon Yazawin while disproving Hmannan's dates for those. (Myazedi, inscribed in four scripts, is the Rosetta Stone that helped unlock the Pyu language.) Likewise, King Bayinnaung's Shwezigon Pagoda Bell Inscription (1557) provides the exact dates of 17 key events of his first six years in power, enabling modern historians to check the chronicles. However, not all inscriptions are reliable records of secular events. The famous Kalyani Inscriptions (1479), for example, make claims of legitimacy of the Hanthawaddy monarchy on religious grounds.

Myanmar possesses the largest number of historical stone inscriptions as well as most complete historical records in all of Southeast Asia. The first systematic effort to preserve the inscriptions was launched by King Bodawpaya per the royal order dated 23 July 1783 to check then existing chronicles with inscriptional evidence. By 1793, over 600 inscriptions from throughout the country were copied (recast), and kept at the capital Amarapura. European scholars in the British colonial period greatly expanded the collection effort, with a 1921 edition of Epigraphia Birmanica by Charles Duroiselle listing some 1500 inscriptions in original spelling and a large photograph of each text. The most complete set of inscriptions, called She-haung Myanma Kyauksa Mya (ရှေးဟောင်း မြန်မာ ကျောက်စာများ; lit. "Ancient Inscriptions of Myanmar") was only recently published by Yangon University's Department of Archaeology in five volumes from 1972 to 1987. Aside from over 500 Pagan period inscriptions, most of the other stone inscriptions have not been studied systematically.

== Early chronicles ==
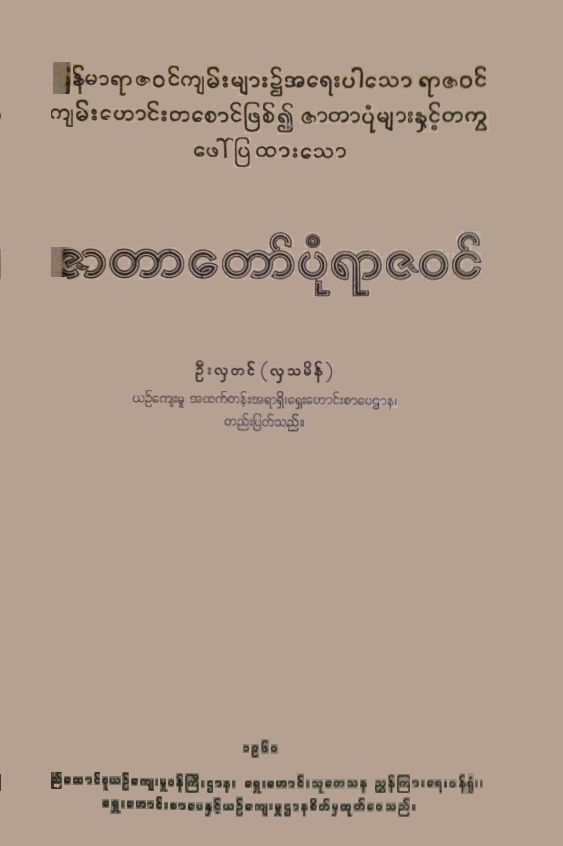
Cover of 1960 publication of Zatadawbon Yazawin Chronicle

Early chronicles on palm-leaf manuscripts are those written prior to the 18th century when national chronicles first emerged. Of the earliest chronicles, those of Pagan and early Ava (to early 15th century), whose names have been mentioned in inscriptions and later chronicles, only two supplementary chronicles from the late 13th and early 15th centuries survived. The rest of early chronicles date only from the 16th century. (Note: (Aung-Thwin 2005: 121–124, 358): Zatadawbon is the earliest surviving chronicle, whose first portions may have been written circa 1285. The next extant chronicle is Yazawin Kyaw (1502 and 1520). (Harvey 1925: xvi-xvii): the rest of them do not date before the 16th century.)

Many of the early chronicles did not survive for a number of reasons. First, the earliest manuscripts prior to the 15th century were rare and extremely costly. (A 1273 Pagan manuscript of Tripiṭaka cost 3000 kyats of silver, which could buy over 2000 hectares of paddy fields.) The cost of producing manuscripts (creating as well as recopying) did come down in the Ava period as literacy rates improved, and the Burmese literature "grew more voluminous and diverse". Even then, most did not survive warfare, the main factor in destruction of historical records in Burmese history. Burmese history is littered with instances of conquering forces destroying the conquered's records: Pagan records in 1287 during the Mongol invasions; Ava records in 1525 and in 1527 by the armies of Confederation of Shan States; Hanthawaddy records in 1565 by a rebellion; Toungoo records in 1600 by Mrauk-U forces; more Toungoo records in 1754 by Restored Hanthawaddy; remaining Hanthawaddy records in 1757 by Konbaung forces; Arakanese records in 1785 by Konbaung; Konbaung records in 1885 by the British. Perhaps not surprisingly, the most complete surviving chronicles are those of Upper Burma-based dynasties, which often were the victors of the wars. Even for those that survived the wars, "there were no record-room methods; mildew, ants, the accident of fire prevented many manuscripts reaching a great age". Those that survived did so only because private individuals outside the capital had painstakingly copied the original palm leaf manuscripts. (Note: See (Thaw Kaung 2010: 13–37) on the chronicle writers and copiers, many of whom were monks and hailed from outside Ava (the capital). Copying the manuscripts was a painstaking and at times error-prone process. See (Pan Hla 1968: 3–4) and (Sein Myint 2007: 30–34) on copying errors. For a more detailed analysis on how chronicles were changed or altered, see (Aung-Thwin 2005: 121–153) which covers all the standard chronicles and all known Mon chronicles.) The survival of the manuscripts was also facilitated by the increasing literacy rates in the Irrawaddy valley. In the 15th century, when the literacy rate was still low, the scribal work was chiefly handled by monks, but by the late 18th century, it was routinely handled by commoners as adult male literacy exceeded 50 percent. (Note: See (Lieberman 2003: 188–190) on the literacy rates of pre-colonial Burma. The first British censuses find that adult male literacy, defined as the ability to read and write simple materials, exceeded 50 percent. The 1891 census, conducted five years after the last Anglo-Burmese War, finds 62.5% of all adult males (age 25 and over) in Upper Burma were literate. Excluding non-Burmans would have raised this figure even higher. Female literacy was very low. A mere 1.5% of girls over age five were in school compared to 53.2% of boys who were. A 1901 census finds only 5.5% of the females in all of Burma were literate although the rate for Burman women was higher. (Steinberg 2009: 23–24): According to early British observers, "Burma was the most literate state between Suez and Japan", and one early 19th-century British observer "believed that Burmese women had a higher percentage of literacy than British women.")

As a result, the earliest surviving "chronicles" were not even the full official chronicles of their own era. The earliest extant chronicle, Zatadawbon Yazawin ("The Royal Horoscopes Chronicle") first written in the late 13th century by court astrologers was primarily a record of regnal dates of Upper Burma's kings. Likewise, the next surviving chronicle, the Yazawin Kyaw ("The Celebrated Chronicle"), written in 1502, was mainly a religious document; only one-seventh of the treatise concerned the affairs of Burmese kings down to 1496. Indeed, it was not even meant to be an authoritative chronicle as its author stated there was already an existing chronicle of the Ava court.

In general, the early chronicles can be categorised as (1) histories of the rival kingdoms of 14th to 16th centuries, (2) ancient histories of kingdoms of previous eras (pre-14th century), and (3) biographies of famous kings.

Topic	Examples
1. Histories of contemporary kingdoms	Zatadawbon Yazawin ("Royal Horoscopes Chronicle"); Yazawin Kyaw ("Celebrated Chronicle"); Inwa Yazawin ("Chronicle of Ava Kingdom); Ketumadi Yazawin ("Chronicle of Early Toungoo Dynasty"); Hanthawaddy Yazawin ("Chronicle of Hanthawaddy kingdom"); Zinme Yazawin ("Chronicle of Lan Na"); Pawtugi Yazawin ("Chronicle of the Portuguese in Burma")
2. Histories of ancient kingdoms	Tagaung Yazawin ("Chronicle of Tagaung Kingdom"); Pagan Yazawin Haung ("Old Chronicle of Pagan Dynasty")
3. Biographies of famous kings	Razadarit Ayedawbon (of King Razadarit and his predecessors); Hanthawaddy Hsinbyushin Ayedawbon (of King Bayinnaung)

Many of the early chronicles in some form had survived at least to the early 18th century since they were referenced by Maha Yazawin. An analysis of the passages of the chronicles directly quoted in Maha Yazawin shows that the referenced chronicles were most probably 16th century copies of the original chronicles, judging by their use of language, and most likely incomplete and partial copies, judging by their lack of specific dates, prior to the Toungoo period.

== National chronicles ==
The first comprehensive national chronicle emerged only in 1724. Subsequent chronicles were heavily influenced by the first chronicle.

=== Maha Yazawin ===
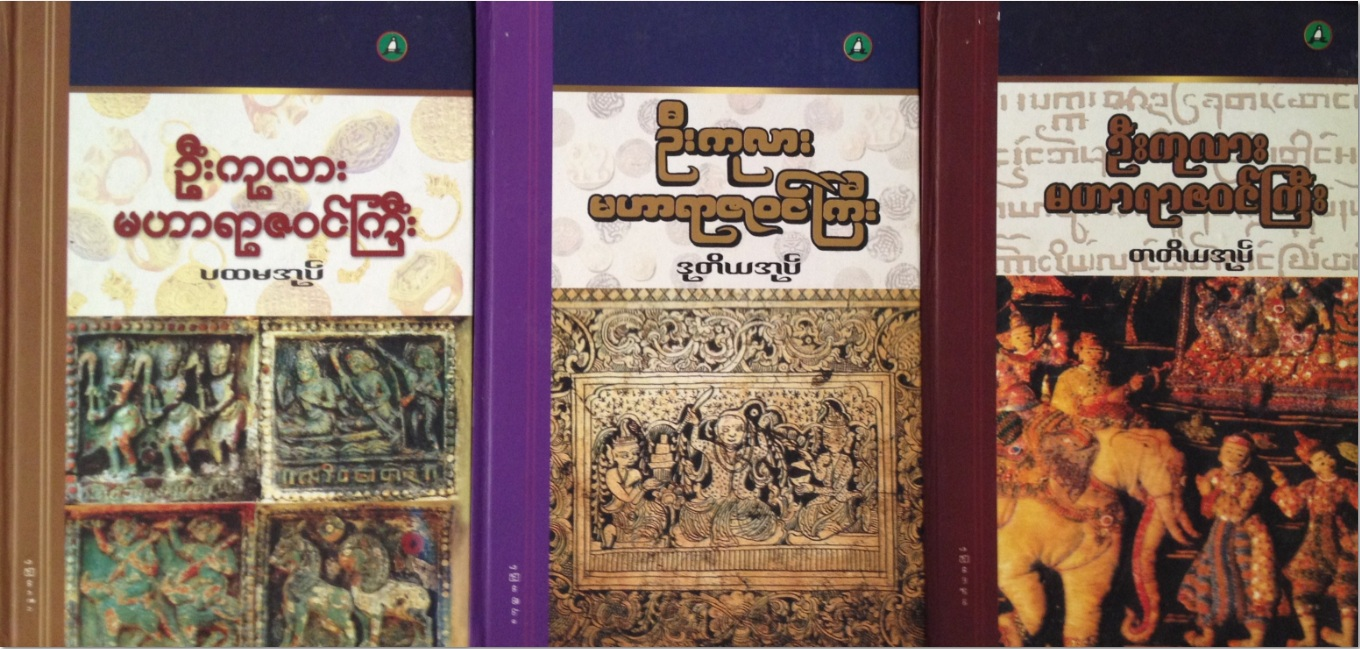
2006 reprint of Maha Yazawin

The Maha Yazawin (Great Chronicle), (Note: Formerly romanized as the Maha-Radza Weng.) completed in 1724 with a minor update in 1729, was composed by U Kala, an official at the Toungoo court. It was the first major chronicle in Burma to synthesize all the ancient, regional, foreign and biographic histories to which he had access. Kala weaved all the regional Burmese chronicles as well as foreign (Mahavamsa and the Ayutthaya Chronicle) together to form a consistent national narrative. (Note: (Aung-Thwin 2005: 136–139): Kala also referenced Zinme Yazawin (Chiang Mai Chronicle). It would not have been considered a foreign chronicle because at that time, Chiang Mai or Lan Na was another Burmese Shan State, albeit the largest and most important one.) Kala wrote three versions by length: Maha Yazawin Gyi (full version, 21 volumes), Yazawin Lat (medium version, 10 volumes), Yazawin Gyok (abridged version, 1 volume). Since it was written in the late Toungoo period, Maha Yazawin provides its most specific information on dates and descriptions of various events Toungoo kings partook. It traces the life of each king chronologically, wherever possible, from his birth to the grave or his dethronement. However, its narrative of the earlier periods is far more sketchy, offering only the year, not the specific date, in most cases. It shows that Kala did not have the full versions of earlier chronicles, and that he did not check any inscriptions, which would have yielded more specific dates and double-checked the events.

=== Yazawin Thit ===
The next major chronicle, Yazawin Thit ("New Chronicle"), written in 1798, was an attempt to check Maha Yazawin with epigraphic evidence. (It is the first historical document in Southeast Asia compiled in consultation with epigraphic evidence. It shows that historians in Southeast Asia were using epigraphy for sourcing and verification around the same time as the practice was first used in Europe, even if Twinthin's methods may not have "evolved into a formal method".) Its author, Twinthin Taikwun Maha Sithu, consulted over 600 stone inscriptions, which he had collected and copied from around the kingdom between 1783 and 1793 per King Bodawpaya's decree, to verify the accuracy of Maha Yazawin. It was the only Burmese chronicle (other than Zatadawbon Yazawin) to organise itself by dynasties and periods whereas all others had been organised strictly along the linear order of kings, and the first to link the origins of Burmese monarchy to Buddhism.

The chronicle updates the events up to 1785, and contains several corrections and critiques of earlier chronicles. However, the chronicle was not well received, and ultimately rejected by the king and the court who found the critiques of earlier chronicles excessively harsh. It became known as A-pe-gan Yazawin (အပယ်ခံ ရာဇဝင်, the "Discarded Chronicle").

Nonetheless, when Hmannan Yazawin, the first officially accepted chronicle of Konbaung Dynasty, appeared in 1832, it had incorporated many of Yazawin Thit's corrections, in particular regnal dates of Pagan period kings. Modern scholarship notes the chronicle's innovative use of epigraphy but does not find the chronicle's criticisms harsh. Rather, scholarship maintains that for its criticisms and corrections, the chronicle largely retains traditional narratives, and "was —as elsewhere in the world —written with didactic intentions".

=== Hmannan Yazawin ===
Hmannan Yazawin, known in English as the "Glass Palace Chronicle", was compiled by the Royal Historical Commission in 1829–1832. The chronicle covers events right up to 1821, right before the First Anglo-Burmese War (1824–1826). The commission consulted several existing chronicles and local histories (thamaings) and the inscriptions collected by Bodawpaya, as well as eigyins, poetry describing epics of kings and mawguns, panegyric poems. Although the compilers disputed some of the earlier accounts, they by and large retained the accounts of Maha Yazawin and Yazawin Thit. The most important development was Hmannan's disposal of the hitherto prevalent pre-Buddhist origin story of Burmese monarchy, and linkage of the monarchy to the clan of the Buddha and the first king of Buddhist mythology, Maha Sammata. (The head of the Royal Historical Commission, Monywe Sayadaw, also wrote a similar chronicle to Hmannan called Maha Yazawin Kyaw ("Great Celebrated Chronicle") in 1831. The learned monk had been writing the chronicle prior to his appointment, and completed his own chronicle because he did not agree with some of the points in Hmannan.)

The second part of Hmannan, also called the Second Chronicle, was written in 1867–1869 by another committee of scholars. It covers the events up to 1854, including the first two Anglo-Burmese wars. The Second Chronicle's account of the two wars, according to historian Htin Aung, was "written with the objectivity of a true historian, and the great national defeats were described faithfully in detail." The posthumous names of "Bodawpaya" ("Royal Lord Grandfather") and "Bagyidawpaya" ("Royal Lord Paternal Uncle") were introduced in this chronicle; the kings respectively were grandfather and paternal uncle to King Mindon who had commissioned the chronicle.

The third instalment came in 1905, nearly twenty years after the end of Burmese monarchy, and was written by Maung Maung Tin, who had a distinguished career in the British administration. Tin updated the chronicle to 1885, to the fall of the monarchy, relying mainly on the court records obtained from several members of the royal library and also on the papers seized by the British and kept in libraries. (Almost all the records of the Konbaung Dynasty had gone up in flames as drunken British soldiers burned down the royal library soon after King Thibaw's surrender in 1885.) (Note: (Myint-U 2006: 30); The wanton destruction of the buildings of the palace ended only in 1901 when Viceroy Lord Curzon issued an order to preserve what was left of the palace.) Tin updated the chronicle in 1921, and included the death of King Thibaw in 1916 as a postscript.

=== List of national chronicles ===
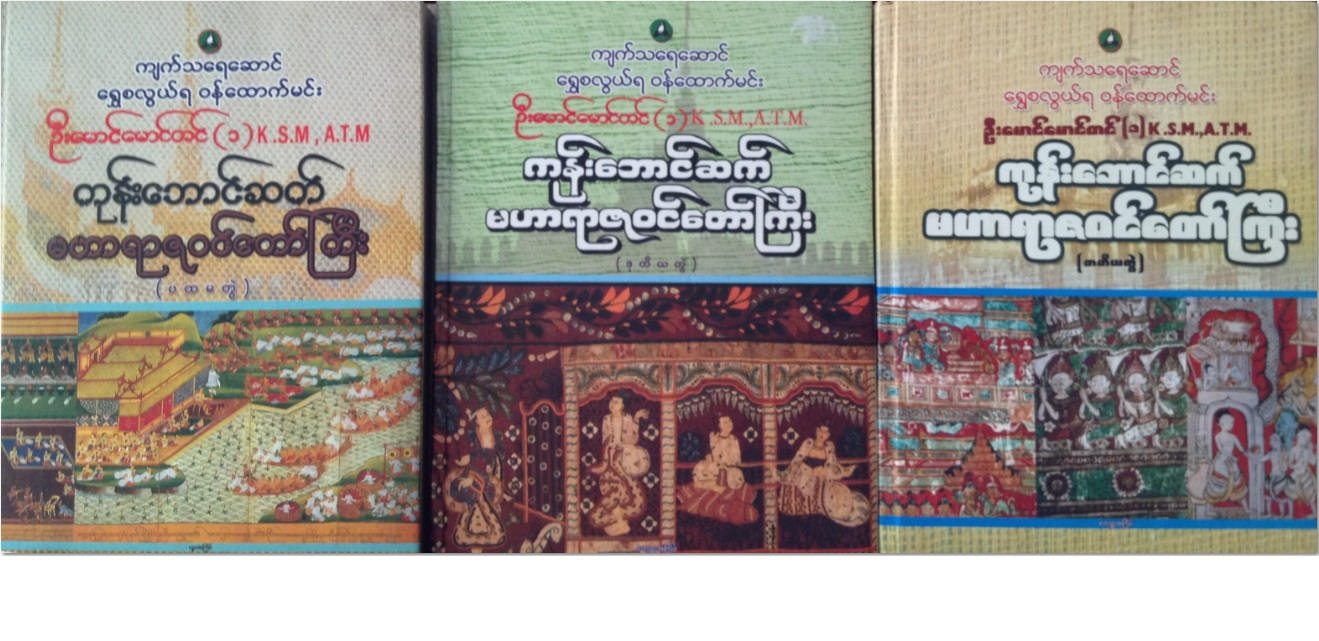
Hmannan Part III or Konbaung Set Yazawin

The following is a list of standard chronicles with two notable exceptions. Though officially commissioned by King Bodawpaya, Yazawin Thit was not accepted by the Konbaung court as its official chronicle. It is included in this list because Hmannan retains many of Yazawin Thit's corrections. Likewise, Konbaung Set Yazawin or Hmannan Yazawin Part III was written after the monarchy was abolished, and thus not official.

Name	Date(s)	Author(s)	Brief
Maha Yazawin; The Great Chronicle	1724	U Kala	The first major chronicle; covers Burmese monarchy from time immemorial to October 1711
Yazawin Thit; The New Chronicle	1798	Twinthin Taikwun Maha Sithu	First chronicle to use epigraphy to verify prior events; covers up to 1785; rejected by the Konbaung court
Hmannan Yazawin, Part I The Glass Palace Chronicle, Part I	1832	Royal Historical Commission	Covers up to 1821
Hmannan Yazawin Part II; The Glass Palace Chronicle, Part II	1869	Royal Historical Commission	Covers up to 1854; also called the Second Chronicle
Hmannan Yazawin Part III; The Glass Palace Chronicle, Part III	1905	Maung Maung Tin	Covers 1752–1885; commonly called Konbaung Set Yazawin

== Biographic chronicles ==
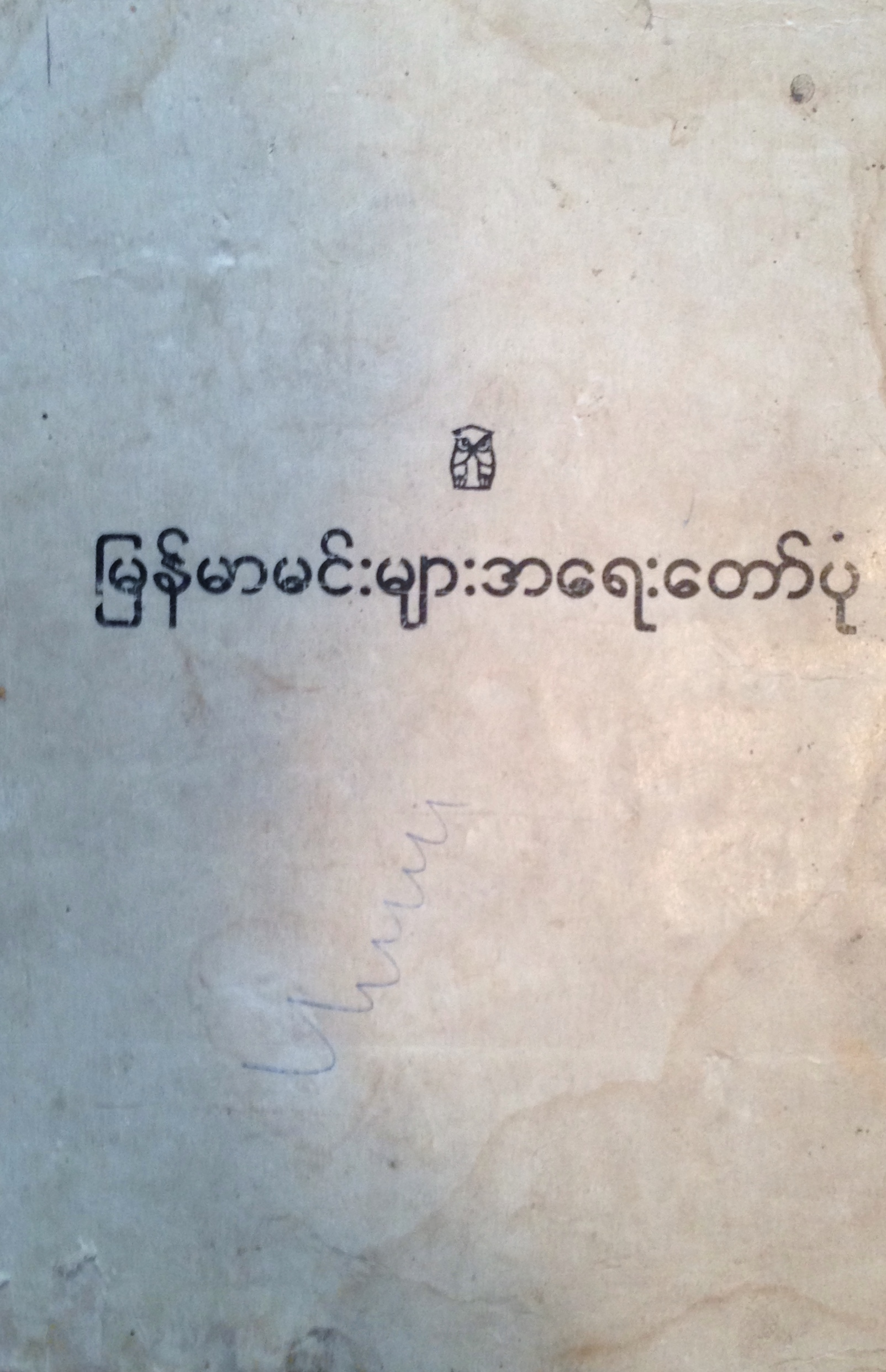
1967 collection of five rare ayedawbon chronicles: Dhanyawaddy, Razadarit, Hsinbyumyashin, Nyaungyan, Alaung Mintaya

Usually named ayedawbons, biographic chronicles cover the life of more celebrated kings such as Razadarit, Bayinnaung, Nyaungyan and Alaungpaya in detail. Note: Razadarit Ayedawbon is actually the first half of the Hanthawaddy chronicle. At least two Alaungpaya biographies by different original authors exist. Hsinbyushin Ayedawbon is actually about the reign of King Bodawpaya, not the more famous Hsinbyushin and Bodawpaya's brother, King Hsinbyushin.

Name	Date(s)	Author(s)	Brief
Zatadawbon Yazawin; The Royal Horoscopes Chronicle	c. late 13th to 19th centuries	Various court historians	Earliest surviving chronicle, continuously updated and handed down by court historians from generation to generation Mainly covers regnal dates of kings from Pagan to Konbaung periods, and horoscopes of 36 select kings from Pagan to early Restored Toungoo periods, as well as those of Konbaung kings.
Razadarit Ayedawbon; The Chronicle of Razadarit	c. 1550s–1565	Binnya Dala	Burmese translation of first half of Hanthawaddy Yazawin (1287–1421)
Hanthawaddy Hsinbyushin Ayedawbon; The Chronicle of Bayinnaung	c. 1580	Yazataman	Covers the life of King Bayinnaung to 1579
Alaung Mintayagyi Ayedawbon; The Chronicle of Alaungpaya	c. 1766	Letwe Nawrahta	Covers the life of King Alaungpaya (1714–1760); two versions in existence, also one by Twinthin Taikwun
Alaungpaya Ayedawbon; The Chronicle of Alaungpaya	c. 1760	Twinthin Taikwun Maha Sithu	Covers the life of King Alaungpaya (1714–1760); two versions in existence, also one by Letwe Nawrahta
Nyaungyan Mintaya Ayedawbon; The Chronicle of Nyaungyan	c. 1760	Maha Atula Dammikayaza or Letwe Nawrahta	Covers the life of King Nyaungyan; based on Minye Deibba eigyin written in 1608 by Shin Than Kho
Hsinbyushin Ayedawbon; The Chronicle of Bodawpaya	c. 1786–1790	Letwe Nawratha	Covers the early reign of King Bodawpaya (1782–1786), despite the title; still in the original palm leaf manuscript form, never been published

== Regional chronicles ==
Regional chronicles are the histories of various small kingdoms such as (Hanthawaddy kingdom and Mrauk-U Kingdom) and tributary vassal states (Early Toungoo, Prome, major Shan states of Lan Na, Kengtung, Hsenwi and Hsipaw) which maintained their own court and court historians. The regional chronicles were most relevant during the small kingdoms (warring states) period of Burmese history (14th to 16th centuries). The tradition of local court histories vanished in the Irrawaddy valley starting in the 17th century when Restored Toungoo kings integrated the entire valley into the core administrative system. The chronicle tradition continued only in farther major tributaries such as Kengtung and Lan Na, and indeed in the independent kingdom of Mrauk-U until it was conquered by Konbaung Dynasty in 1785. (Note: See (Lieberman 2003: 158–202) for administrative and economic reforms begun by Restored Toungoo kings and continued by Konbaung Dynasty. Regional courts in the Irrawaddy valley were vanquished, and the number and power of Shan courts greatly reduced.)

=== Upper Burma ===
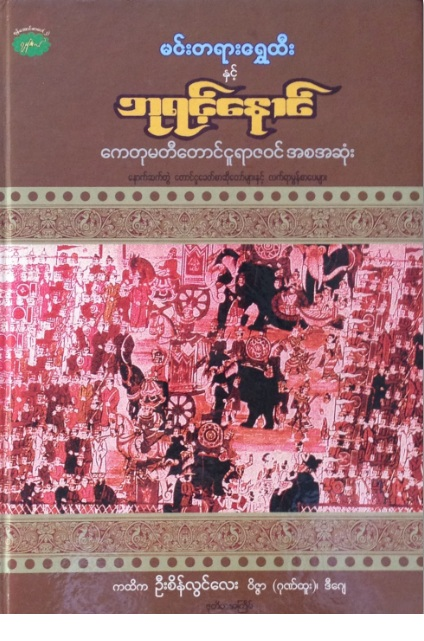
Ketumadi Toungoo Yazawin

Name	Date(s)	Author(s)	Brief
Pagan Yazawin	16th century		Known as Pagan Yazawin Haung (Old Pagan Chronicle); One palm-leaf manuscript stored at the Universities Historical Research Center, Yangon
Pagan Yazawin Thit	19th century	U Bhe	New Pagan Chronicle; Formally, "Yaza Wunthalini Pagan Yazawin Thit"
Inwa Yazawin	14th–16th centuries		Full chronicle did not survive. Extant portions referenced by Maha Yazawin.
Toungoo Yazawin	c. 1480s	Shin Nyana Thikhangyi	An 1837 version of an earlier copy survives; Covers rulers of Toungoo/Taungoo from 1279 to 1613. Detailed history begins only from 1481, from the start of the reign of Min Sithu
Pyay Yazawin	c. 16th century		Covers rulers of Prome/Pyay 1287–1542
Myauk Nan Kyaung Yazawin	1661	Myauk Nan Kyaung Sayadaw	An abridged history compiled per request of King Pye

=== Ramanya ===
The original Mon language chronicles of the two main Mon-speaking kingdoms of the second millennium did not survive in their full form. The chronicles of the Hanthawaddy kingdom (1287–1539, 1550–1552) were destroyed in 1565 during a rebellion led by ex-Hanthawaddy officials that burned down the whole city of Pegu (Bago). Likewise, most of the records of Restored Hanthawaddy Kingdom (1740–1757) were destroyed in 1757 by Konbaung forces. Therefore, the earliest extant chronicles are only parts of the original chronicles. The first half (1287–1421) of the original Hanthawaddy Yazawin had been translated into Burmese by Binnya Dala as Razadarit Ayedawbon before the 1565 rebellion, and the Burmese translation has survived. (To be precise, four oldest palm-leaf copies conjecturally dated to mid 18th century survived. In all, nine slightly different versions of existed according to a 1968 analysis by historian Nai Pan Hla. Pan Hla re-translated one of the versions back to Mon in 1958. He also wrote a new (tenth) version in 1968, synthesising the Burmese versions of Razadarit, Pak Lat's version, and the accounts in Hmannan as well as modern research.)

Other extant chronicles are even more limited in scope: they are mainly supplementary chronicles dealing with specific topics. Nidana Arambhakatha ("Preface to the Legend") covers the genealogy of kings, and was supposedly part of a larger treatise called Ramann'-uppatti-dipaka ("An Explanation of the Origins of Ramannadesa"). The surviving copy of Nidana is dated to the 18th century although the copy says its original manuscript was compiled in year 900 ME (1538/39 CE). Another chronicle called Gavampati, likely compiled between the 18th and 19th centuries, mainly covers the early (legendary) history, claiming its early monarchs' linkage to the Buddha. Another 18th-century chronicle, Slatpat Rajawan Datow Smim Ron ("History of Kings"), written by a monk, was also a religion/legend-centric chronicle although it does cover secular history from Sri Ksetra and Pagan to Hanthawaddy periods. Like Gavampati, and Hmannan of the same period, Slatpat too linked its kings to the Buddha and Buddhist mythology.

Indeed, the most complete compilation of the history of Mon kingdoms would have to wait until 1910 and 1912 when Pak Lat Chronicles was published in a two-volume set. It was reportedly based on the stash of manuscripts found at Pak Lat, then an ethnic Mon enclave east of Bangkok. (The provenance and chronology of the manuscripts used in the publications are uncertain, and had not yet been studied by a Burma Mon scholar as of 2005.) Pak Lat weaves together all existing Mon narratives, including the history of Thaton Kingdom, Gavampati's linkage with the Buddha, the Hanthawaddy Chronicle from monarchs Wareru to Shin Sawbu (1287–1472), and Nidana's genealogy of kings.

Name	Date(s)	Author(s)	Brief
Nidana Arambhakatha; Preface to the Legend	c. 1538		Supplementary chronicle dealing with genealogy of kings
Razadarit Ayedawbon; The Chronicle of Razadarit	c. 1550s–1565	Binnya Dala	Burmese translation of first half of Hanthawaddy Yazawin (1287–1421)
Gavampati	c. 1710 to 19th century		Supplementary chronicle covering legendary early history
Slapat Rajawan (Bago Rajawan)	1766	Sayadaw Athwa	Covers 17 dynasties from the legendary times to the Hanthawaddy period
Lik Amin Asah; Account of the Founding of Pegu	1825		Legendary early history
Pak Lat Chronicles	1910–1912	Unknown	The most complete compilation of Mon chronicles in existence; the provenance of the original manuscripts are yet to be studied.

=== Arakan ===
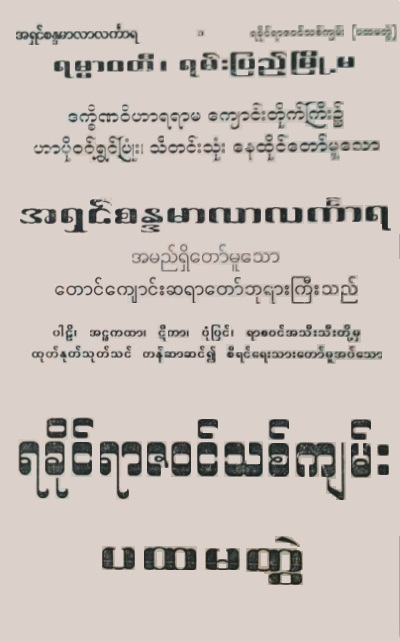
1997–1999 reprint of Rakhine Razawin Thit

Although the earliest extant work of Arakanese literature in Arakanese (Burmese) script, Rakhine Minthami Eigyin ("Lullaby for a Princess of Arakan"), was written only in 1455, Arakanese chronicle tradition most likely began at least a century earlier. (The Burmese script had already been in use at the Arakanese court at least since the 1330s when the future King Swa Saw Ke of Ava was educated there. According to Pamela Gutman, the use of Burmese script appeared for the first time in the Le-Mro period (11th to 15th centuries) on stone inscriptions.) Much earlier Devanagari inscriptions exist (as early as c. 550 CE) but it does not appear that the Arakanese chronicles consulted the inscriptions in any case because later court historians could not read the earliest inscriptions. Indeed, to date, most of the inscriptions have not been fully examined, or translated. (Note: (Singer 2008: 16–17); only a portion of the Ananda Chandra inscriptions was translated into English in 1930, and into Burmese in 1975.)

Though Arakanese chronicles may have been written circa the 14th century, all extant Arakanese chronicles were written between the 18th and 20th centuries, from before the destruction of Mrauk-U to the before the Second World War. Arakanese palm-leaf chronicles held in Myanmar by the National Library and Yangon University, and those in the British Library and Museum of the Asiatic Society of Bengal in Calcutta date from 1775 to 1887.

Most of Mrauk-U's historical works did not survive the burning of the royal library by the Konbaung forces in 1785. Only portions escaped the indiscriminate destruction. An Arakanese monk tried to salvage the wreckage as much as he could by promptly compiling the Dhanyawaddy Yazawin. He completed it in 1788 but the chronicle may not be as reliable as it is "a third-hand piece of work". Colonial period scholars had to piece together the extant portions of Maha Razawin (148 angas or 1776 palm-leaves), Do We's Rakhine Razawin (48 angas / 576 leaves), Saya Mi's Maha Razawin (24 angas / 288 leaves). In the late 20th century, historian San Tha Aung could confirm only eight of the supposed 48 historical works of Arakanese history. Even of the extant eight, he was unsure of the reliability of the information prior to 1000 CE.

All Arakanese Arakanese chronicles remain untranslated into English. It means the Arakanese accounts have not been open to (non-Burmese reading) international scholars. According to historian Michael Charney, the Arakanese accounts need to be checked since "the references to Arakan in the chronicles of Arakan’s neighbors, such as Pegu, Ayudhya, and Ava are on the whole biased or ill-informed." Like other Burmese chronicles, Arakanese chronicles linked their kings to the Buddha and Buddhist mythology. The surviving chronicles were written to legitimize the right of Arakan to independent rule, and by doing so greatly exaggerated the duration of Arakanese presence in the region, even though Arakanese began migrating into Arakan around the ninth century, and gained control of the region by the 11th century. For instance, the Dhanyawaddy Ayedawbon presents Arakans an independent kingdom for at least three millennia.

Name	Date(s)	Author(s)	Brief
Maha Razawin			
Rakhine Razawin		Do We	
Inzauk Razawin			
Razawin Linka			
Min Razagri Aredaw Sadan; Also called Razawin Haung (Old Chronicle)	c. 1775		
Dhanyawaddy Ayedawbon	1788	Rakhine Sayadaw	Covers history of Arakan from 825 BCE to 1785 CE
Mizzimadetha Ayedawbon	1823	Ne Myo Zeya Kyawhtin	History of Arakan (1785–1816) from the fall of Mrauk-U to 1816
Maha Razawin (Saya Me)	c. 1840	Saya Me	Palm leaf manuscript collected by the British
Rakhine Razawin Thit	1931	Shin Sandamala Linkara	Compilation of all extant prior Arakanese chronicles in a single narrative.

=== Shan states ===
The rulers of Shan states, called saophas (sawbwas), held court even as they paid tribute to their larger neighbours. Some of the larger Shan states such as Lan Na (Chiang Mai), Kengtung, Hsenwi, Hsipaw and Mong Yawng also maintained their own histories down to the 19th century, similar to what other vassal states such as Prome and Toungoo did in the 14th and 16th centuries. (Lan Na was tributary to Burma from 1558 to 1775.) At any rate, only Lan Na and Kengtung, the two largest Shan states, had sizeable chronicles. Moreover, the earliest extant copies of Lan Na date only from the 18th century even though the original copy of Jinakalamali of Chiang Mai is said to have been compiled in 1527. The rest of the smaller Shan state chronicles (Hsenwi, Hsipaw, etc.) date only from the 19th century. Like their Burmese and Mon counterparts, various Shan chronicles also claim their sawbwas' descent from the clan of the Buddha, which British colonial period scholars took to be a sign of copying from Hmannan and as a sign of their recent nature. G.E. Harvey, a colonial period scholar, found the extant Shan chronicles "consistently reckless with regard to dates, varying a couple of centuries on every other leaf", and discarded them.

The Shan local histories were written in a variety of Shan scripts. Jinakalamali was originally written in Pali, Zinme Yazawin in Lan Na script, and Kengtung Yazawin in Khun script, for example. (At least six Shan scripts—Tai Long, Tai Hkamti, Tai Neu, Khun, Tai Yun (Kengwi), Tai Yun (Lan Na) were in use in Burmese Shan states.) Excluding Lan Na chronicles, only Kengtung Yazawin has been fully translated into English as the Padaeng Chronicle and the Jengtung State Chronicle. (Two Lan Na chronicles of the Chiang Mai Chronicle and the Nan Chronicle have also been translated into English.) (Note: See (Wyatt 1998: Chiang Mai Chronicle) and (Ratchasomphan and Wyatt 1994: The Nan Chronicle))

Name	Date(s)	Author(s)	Brief
Jinakalamali	1527 (c. 1788)	Ratanapanna Thera	Mostly about religious history with a section on early Lan Na kings The original manuscript, written in Pali, did not survive. Earliest surviving version c. 1788.
Zinme Yazawin	18th century	Sithu Gamani Thingyan	Chronicle of Chiang Mai (Lan Na) under Burmese rule
Kengtung Yazawin			Formally, the Padaeng Chronicle and the Jengtung State Chronicle
Hsenwi Yazawin	c. 19th century?		
Hsipaw Yazawin	c. 19th century?		Covers from 58 BCE but likely a much recent work
Mong Yawng Yazawin	c. 19th century?		

=== Miscellaneous ===
There are also chronicles that fall outside of general categorisation. Pawtugi Yazawin covers the history of the Portuguese, especially their rule at Syriam (Thanlyin) from 1599 to 1613. Dawei Yazawin and Myeik Yazawin are chronicles of Tavoy (Dawei) and Myeik (Mergui), compiled after the Burmese conquest of Tenasserim in 1765.

Name	Date(s)	Author(s)	Brief
Dawei Yazawin; The Chronicle of Tavoy	1795		
Myeik Yazawin; The Chronicle of Mergui	1795?		Translated into English by J.S. Furnivall
Pawtugi Yazawin	early 19th century	Ignacio de Brito and Johannes Moses	Covers the Portuguese of Burma and their rule at Syriam (Thanlyin)

== Supplementary sources ==
=== Chronicles in verse ===
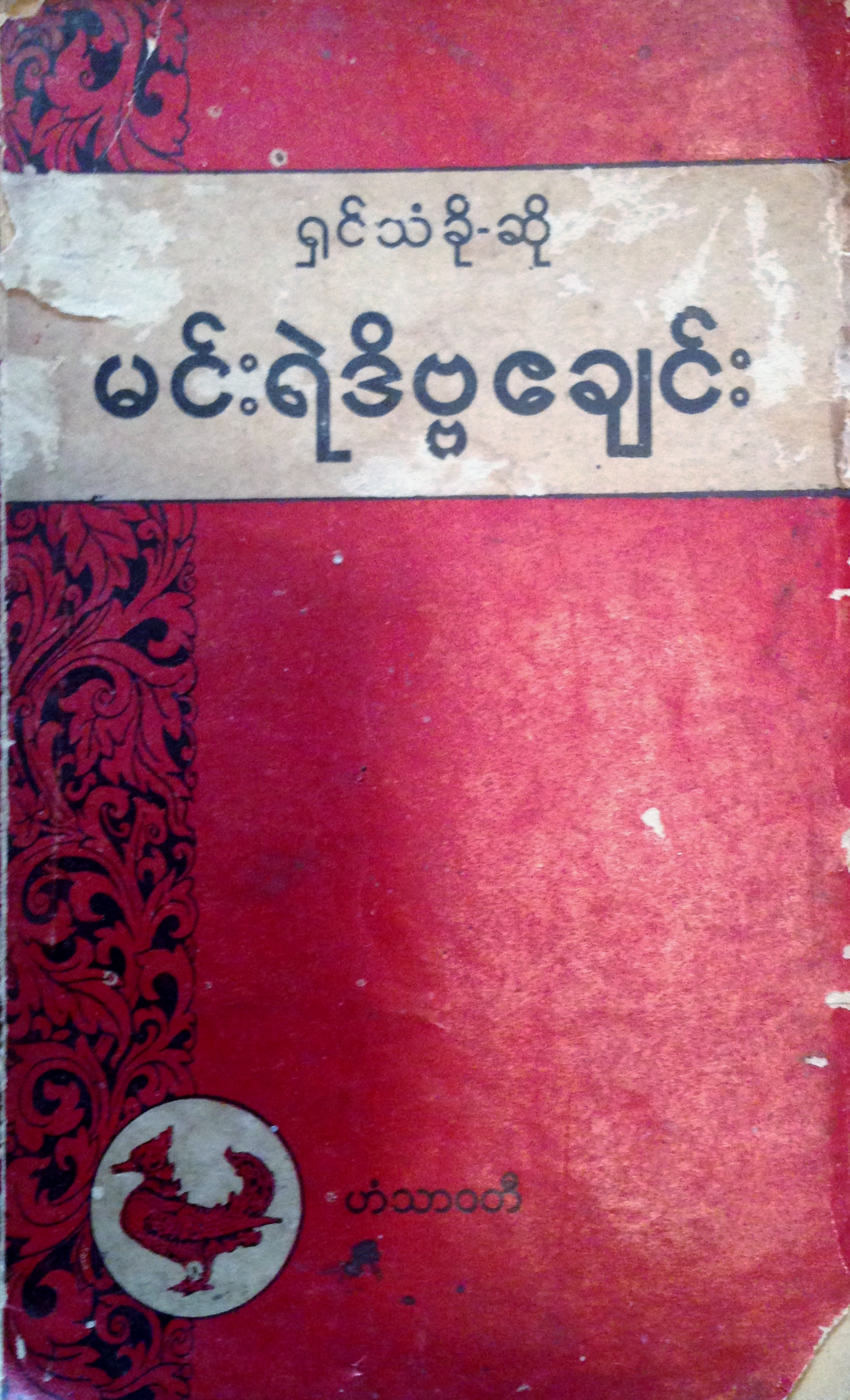
1967 copy of Minye Deibba Eigyin

The chronicles were also written in verse, chiefly in eigyin or mawgun forms, and secondarily in the form of yazawin thanbauk. Eigyins are elaborate lullabies for young princes and princesses, written to inform the royal children of their genealogy and the achievements of their forebears. Since the antiquity of the royal family's genealogy mattered greatly, the poets did their best to trace the ancestors as far back as they could, with considerable use of their own imagination. The earliest eigyin (Mauktaw Eigyin, or more commonly known as Rakhine Minthami Eigyin) dates from 1455, and is also the earliest extant Burmese poetry on palm-leaf. Over 40 royal eigyins are on record. Mawguns are panegyric poems, composed as a rule to commemorate an important event. The subjects range from the arrival of a white elephant at the court to the conquest of Siam, from the completion of a canal to an essay on cosmology. The earliest mawgun dates from 1472. The poet's duty was to glorify the event in an ornate language in verse. There are more than 60 extant mawguns. Both eigyin and mawgun were composed in four-syllable lines, albeit in different styles. A few yazawin thanbauks, or historical epigrams or chronograms, from the 18th and 19th centuries have also survived. The often lengthy thanbauks list the pairings of year dates to historical events.

With their poetical imagery and excessive glorification, eigyins, mawguns and thanbauks are of high literary value but of limited historical value. Some of the more well known chronicles in verse are:

Name	Date(s)	Author(s)	Brief
Rakhine Minthami Eigyin	1455	Adu Min Nyo	Earliest extant Arakanese literature as well as Burmese poetry on palm-leaf manuscripts; about Princess Saw Shwe Kra, favourite daughter of King Ba Saw Pru
Pyay Zon Mawgun	1472	Shin Htwe Nyo	Earliest mawgun; composed by an army officer about suppression of a rebellion at Prome (Pyay)
Thakin Htwe Eigyin	1476	Shin Thuye	Earliest eigyin outside of Arakan; about Thakin Htwe, daughter of Thado Kyaw, Lord of Salin
Shwe Sa-daing Hsindaw	1510	Shin Htwe Nyo	About a royal elephant of King Shwenankyawshin
Minye Deibba Eigyin	1608	Shin Than Kho	Basis for Nyaungyan Mintayagyi Ayedawbon
Yodaya Naing Mawgun	1767	Letwe Nawrahta	Covers the Siege of Ayutthaya (1766–1767); Original manuscript rediscovered in 2003.
Dhanyawaddy Naing Mawgun	1785	Letwe Nawrahta	Covers the Konbaung conquest of Arakan
Minzet Yazawin Thanbauk	early 19th century	Monywe Sayadaw	Covers 14 dynasties up to 1782

=== Administrative treatises and precedents ===
Court scholars also wrote administrative treatises and precedents. The two most well known, Zabu Kun-Cha Po Yaza Mu Haung (ဇမ္ဗူကွန်ချ ဖိုးရာဇာ မူဟောင်း) (c. early 15th century) and Mani Yadanabon (မဏိရတနာပုံ) (1781) are compilations of precedents but also provide an outline of the prior dynasties down to the era in which they were written. Mani Yadanabon, for example, is "a repository of historical examples illustrating pragmatic political principles worthy of Machiavelli". Furthermore, many of these treatises—expositions on institutions, royal insignia, ranks and technical terms—help interpret the chronicles since many of the terms are obsolete.

Name	Date(s)	Author(s)	Brief
Zabu Kun-Cha	c. 1410s	Min Yaza of Wun Zin	Precedents and judgments during the reigns of Swa Saw Ke, Tarabya and Minkhaung I; Only an 1825 copy of the original survives. Later incorporated into Mani Yadanabon.
Lawka Byuha	1755	Inyon Mingyi	Oldest extant work on the protocols of Burmese royalty
Mani Yadanabon	1781	Shin Sandalinka	Updates the precedents and judgments of the early Ava period as reported by Zabu Kun-Cha with later period judgments those by including Binnya Dala (the author of Razadarit Ayedawbon)
Wawhara Linathta Dipani	1830	Hlethin Atwinwun	Exposition on administrative terms of Konbaung Dynasty, on titles of kings and officials
Yazawwada	1831		A treatise on advice to kings
Shwebon Nidan	1878	Zeya Thinkhaya	Explanatory work on technical terms re: the palace and the royal paraphernalia
Myanmar Min Okchokpon Sa-dan	1931–1933	U Tin of Pagan	Five volume work on the administrative machinery and personnel from top-to-bottom.
Shwenanthon Wawhara Abhidan	?	U Tin of Mandalay	Contains valuable information on institutions, insignia, ranks of the royal administration

=== Law treatises and precedents ===
Dhammathats are treatises on law used by Burmese royal courts. Hpyat-htons (also spelled pyattons) are legal precedents by earlier kings. The earliest extant legal treatise Dhammavisala Dhammathat dates from the 12th century while the more well known Mon language Wareru Dhammathat dates from the 1290s. The earliest dhammathats were mainly written in Pali, and were accessible only to the court elite and clergy. Though modeled after the Hindu legal treatise Manusmriti in terms of organization, the content of Burmese dhammathats is mostly Burmese customary law with early dhammathats containing "between 4% and 5%" of the Hindu legal treatise Manusmriti. The Wareru was translated into Burmese, Pali and Siamese, and was the basic law of the First Toungoo Empire. After the empire's fall in 1599, the Code lived on—albeit in adapted forms—in the main successor states. In Siam, it coexisted with other legal codes until King Rama I compiled a new legal code in 1805. The new Siamese law's core 18 chapters share "substantial similarities to King Wareru's code", and the new code adds 21 more chapters. In Burma, the Code morphed into a more Buddhist-centric version by 1640. The new treatise often supports Burmese customary law "with explicitly Buddhist scriptural justifications".

An 1899 analysis by historian U Gaung lists a total of 36 dhammathats that had survived in some form. Some of the more well known law treatises and precedents are:

Name	Date(s)	Author(s)	Brief
Alaungsithu Hpyat-hton	c. 1174–1211	Court of Sithu II	Compilation of legal rulings by King Sithu I; commissioned by his grandson, King Sithu II
Wareru Dhammathat	c. 1290/91	Court of Wareru	Used to be known as the earliest extant law treatise
Dhammathat Kyaw	1580	Court of Bayinnaung	Update of Wareru Dhammathat
Hanthawaddy Hsinbyumyashin Hpyat-hton	1580	Court of Bayinnaung	Rulings of King Bayinnaung
Manu Thara Shwe Myin Dhammathat	1630s	Kaingsa Mingyi	Burmese customary law "with explicitly Buddhist scriptural justifications
Manu Kye Dhammathat	1755	Maha Thiri Ottma Zeya	Compilation of previous law books; extremely popular because it was in vernacular Burmese, and not Pali
Manu Wunnana Shwe Myin Dhammathat	1771	Wunna Kyawhtin	Compilation of earlier law books in Burmese; also updated it in 1772 in Burmese and in Pali with the help of the monk Taungdwin Sayadaw

=== Censuses ===
Sittans, or censuses/revenue inquests, were used by the kings to determine their tax collection and military manpower base. The censuses collected data on the size of population, number and description of villages, arable land, products and taxes. Kings since Pagan times had graded each town and village by the taxes and levy it could raise. The first known instance of a sittan was ordered per the royal decree dated 12 March 1359 while the first nationwide census was commissioned in 1638. The next two national censuses were commissioned in 1784 and 1803. The 1784 census shows the kingdom had a population of 1,831,487, excluding "wild tribes" and the recently conquered Arakan.

Name	Date(s)	Commissioned by	Brief
Thalun Min Sittan	1638	King Thalun	First nationwide revenue inquest
Bodawpaya Sittan, Part I	1784	King Bodawpaya	Second national revenue inquest
Bodawpaya Sittan, Part II	1803	King Bodawpaya	Third national revenue inquest

=== Histories of religion and religious monuments ===
The country's many pagodas and temples also maintain a historical record, usually a stone and/or bell inscription, called thamaing. They furnish important historical information about the religious dedications by the royalty and the wealthy donors. Each thamaing purports to give the history of the founder of the building and of its subsequent benefactors. Such documents include notices of secular events. In addition, some learned monks also wrote chronicles on the history of Buddhism from the time of the Buddha to their present day. The two well known religious chronicles are:

Name	Date(s)	Author(s)	Brief
Yazawin Kyaw; The Celebrated Chronicle	1502, 1520 (Note: (Aung-Thwin 2005: 124, 358): The first part finished in 1502; the second part in 1520.)	Shin Maha Thilawuntha	Mostly covers religious history Only 1/7th concerns Burmese history since it was meant to be supplementary to the official chronicle of the Ava court, which did not survive.
Thathanawin	1861	Pannasami	Sasanavamsa, Chronicle of the Religion; written by a monk, tutor of King Mindon

== Analysis ==
=== Quantity ===
The general fullness of the national historical records of the countries which comprised the Burmese empire is remarkable. They represent a marked contrast to the scantiness, or total absence of such writings, among the ancient Hindu kingdoms. The annals of Siam do not appear to have been kept with the same regularity and fullness as those of Burma, though they furnish an outline of prominent events.

— Arthur Purves Phayre (Note: (Harvey 1925: 343): The Siamese records were wiped out in 1767 when Ayutthaya was sacked by the Royal Burmese Army. As a result, the reconstructed chronicle of Siam was an outline of prominent events, and its chronology off by decades.)

The overall number of the chronicles outside the inscriptions is "modest" due to their destruction in the country's repeated bouts of warfare. Most of the extant material is that of Upper Burmese dynasties, which by the virtue of winning the majority of the wars "possessed an abiding palace and a continuous tradition". The sparseness of the chronicles of Ramanya (Lower Burma), Arakan and Shan states belies the long histories of these former sovereign states, which for centuries were important polities in their own right. Even the Upper Burmese chronicles still have many gaps and lack specificity, especially with regard to pre-Toungoo (pre-16th century) eras.

Still, Myanmar has the highest amount of historical source material in all of Southeast Asia. British colonial period scholars, who were the first ones to reconstruct Burma's history in a "scientific" way and made invaluable efforts to systematically preserve the records, and cast a highly sceptical eye toward the chronicle narratives, nonetheless praised the relative completeness of the extant Burmese material compared to those of Southeast Asian and even Indian states. D.G.E. Hall summarises that "Burma is not the only Southeast Asian country to have large collections of this indispensable source material and precious heritage of the past; no other country surpasses her."

=== Scope ===
The scope of the chronicles is rather narrow. The coverage mostly revolves around the activities of the monarch and the royal family, and offers little perspective on the general situation of the kingdom outside the palace unless the monarch happened to be involved in the event. Remote regions would make an appearance only if they were part of the king's itinerary, or were involved in rebellions or military campaigns. Other records—legal and administrative treatises, censuses and regional chronicles—do provide valuable complementary views. On balance, however, the royal records overall remain heavily monarch-centered: they "tell little of general conditions, and their story is not of the people of Burma but simply that of the dynasties of Upper Burma."

=== Influences ===
The earliest chronicles, such as Yazawin Kyaw and Maha Yazawin were modelled after Mahavamsa. The early Buddhist history (and mythology) came right from the Sri Lankan chronicle. But much of the extant chronicle tradition (both in prose and verse) and the "sophistication in use and manipulation of an expanded Burmese vocabulary and grammar" are legacies of the Ava period.

The Burmese chronicles have been used in Thai historians' effort to reconstruct the Thai history before 1767 for the original Siamese chronicles were destroyed during the sack of Ayutthaya by the Burmese army. In particular, the pre-1767 chronology of Thai history follows that of Burmese chronicles. (The prior reconstructed dates of the 19th century Siamese chronicles had been off by nearly two decades before historians realised it in 1914.)

=== Historicity and accuracy ===
It is impossible to study these, especially in conjunction with other native records, without acquiring considerable respect for them. No other country in Indo-China can show so impressive a continuity. The great record of substantially accurate dates goes back for no less than nine centuries, and even earlier legends have a substratum of truth.

— G.E. Harvey

The chronicles can be divided in two parts: the early mythical origin legends and later factual history. The chronicle narratives start out with early origin myths, and eventually, they slowly change from being mythical to largely factual. Historians treat the Pagan Empire period (1044–1287) as the dividing period between mythical legends and the factual history. The Pagan period narratives still contain a number of legends—according to Harvey, "half the narrative told as historical down to the 13th century is probably folklore"—but the period's "deluge" of inscriptions provide a wealth of information to check the veracity of these narratives. Even the later portions of the chronicles, which have been shown to be largely factual, still were not written purely from a secular history perspective but rather also achieve what Aung-Thwin calls "legitimation according to religious criteria" of the Burmese monarchy.

==== Early history (pre-11th century) ====
Reconstruction of this part of the early Burmese history has been ongoing, and the views of the scholarship evolving. European scholars of the colonial period saw in the narratives mostly the "legends" and "fairly tales", and outright dismissed all of early history as "copies of Indian legends taken from Sanskrit or Pali originals". They highly doubted the antiquity of the chronicle tradition, and dismissed the possibility that any sort of civilisation in Burma could be much older than 500 CE. This assessment was the mainstream view at least to the 1960s. Some did vigorously challenge the views but the dismantling of the views would have to wait until more archaeological evidence came in. (Note: (Aung-Thwin 2005: 295): Although a number of scholars of Burmese origin had expressed their disagreement with the then prevailing interpretation in Burmese language works, Htin Aung was the first scholar who openly challenged then mainstream views in English. See (Htin Aung 1967: 341–344) for Htin Aung's charge of European scholarship's biases. Htin Aung was roundly criticized for his critiques. See (Hall 1968) for Hall's scathing response, and (Htin Aung 1970) for his "Defence of the Chronicles" in response. (Hla Pe 1985) criticizes Htin Aung for what Hla Pe deemed (Htin Aung 1970)'s direct attacks on G.H. Luce; (Aung-Thwin 2005: 295) however finds some of Htin Aung's "refutation, especially of Luce's arguments quite convincing"; overall, Aung-Thwin calls Htin Aung's Defence of the Chronicles "a reasonable critique" of then prevailing views but "not one that advanced the field in a substantive way with regard to hard data.")

Modern scholarship, with the benefit of latest research, now holds a far more nuanced view. Latest research shows that when stripped of the legendary elements, which are now viewed as allegories, the chronicle narratives largely conform to the evidence. Archaeological evidence shows that many of the places mentioned in the royal records have indeed been inhabited continuously for at least 3500 years. For example, at Tagaung, the site of the first Burmese kingdom according to the chronicles, the latest evidence supports the existence of both Tagaung eras (c. 9th century BCE to 1st century CE) reported in the chronicles. On the other hand, evidence suggests many of the early "kingdoms" (Tagaung, Sri Ksetra and Pagan) were contemporary to each other for long periods, and did not exist in a serial fashion as reported in the chronicles. The chronicle narratives of the pre-11th century history are social memory of the times.

==== Post-Pagan ====
The royal records become increasingly more factual where "after the 11th century, the chronology of Burmese chronicles is reliable." One major reason is that Burmese chroniclers could read the inscriptions of the previous eras. It was not the case in Champa, Cambodia and Siam, where "scripts have in the course of centuries undergone such profound changes that the compilers of later chronicles could not read the earlier inscriptions". Likewise, a 1986 study of Maha Yazawin by Lieberman finds much of the history for the 16th century, which was also witnessed by many Europeans, largely factual. To be sure, the post-Pagan narratives are not without issue. According to Harvey, "the chronicles abound in anachronisms, and in stock situations which recur regularly"; the chroniclers regarded "general conditions in early times being the same as those in their own day, the 18th century". Moreover, the troop figures reported in the chronicles for the various military campaigns are at least an order of magnitude higher than the actual number possible given the size of the population and transportation mechanisms of the era.

== Current status ==
Despite Myanmar's possession of large amounts of historical material, many of the records have not been properly maintained, or used for research. Universities' Central Library (UCL) at the University of Yangon is Myanmar's biggest academic library and plays a pivotal role in collecting and preserving historical Burmese manuscripts. UCL has the largest collection of traditional manuscripts in the country, including 15,000 palm-leaf manuscripts and 4,000 parabaiks. The National Library of Myanmar holds 10,000 bundles of palm-leaf manuscripts, which have been collected from private donations and monasteries. Many more rolls of palm-leaf manuscripts remain uncollected, and are moldering in monasteries across the country without proper care as well as under attack by unscrupulous treasure hunters. Efforts to digitise the manuscripts have not materialised. Few have been studied systematically since the Burma Research Society closed the doors in 1980. The society had published the Journal of the Burma Research Society (JBRS) over (1300 articles in 59 volumes) between 1910 and 1980.

== Bibliography ==
- Gerry Abbott, Khin Thant Han, ed. (2000). The Folk-Tales of Burma: An Introduction (Illustrated ed.). Leiden; Boston; Cologne: Brill. p. 392. ISBN 978-90-04-11812-6.
- Allot, Anna; Patricia Herbert; John Okell (1989). Patricia Herbert, Anthony Crothers Milner (ed.). South-East Asia: Languages and Literatures : a Select Guide. University of Hawaii Press. ISBN 978-0-8248-1267-6.
- Aung-Thwin, Michael A. (November 1996). "The Myth of the "Three Shan Brothers" and the Ava Period in Burmese History". The Journal of Asian Studies. 55 (4). Cambridge: Cambridge University Press: 881–901. doi:10.2307/2646527. JSTOR 2646527. S2CID 162150555.
- Aung-Thwin, Michael A. (2005). The Mists of Rāmañña: The Legend that was Lower Burma (illustrated ed.). Honolulu: University of Hawai'i Press. ISBN 978-0-8248-2886-8.
- Aung Tun, Sai (2009). History of the Shan State: From Its Origins to 1962. Chiang Mai: Silk Worm Books. ISBN 978-974-9511-43-5.
- "Burma Press Summary from The Working People's Daily" (PDF). The Working People's Daily. 1 (6). Ibiblio. September 1987.
- Charney, Michael W. (25 July 2002). "Living Bibliography of Burma Studies: The Primary Sources" (PDF). London: SOAS.
- Charney, Michael W. (25 July 2002). "Living Bibliography of Burma Studies: The Secondary Literature" (PDF). London: SOAS.
- Charney, Michael W. (2004). "From Exclusion to Assimilation: Late Precolonial Burmese Literati and "Burman-ness"" (PDF). London: SOAS.
- Charney, Michael W. (2006). Powerful Learning: Buddhist Literati and the Throne in Burma's Last Dynasty, 1752–1885. Ann Arbor: University of Michigan.
- Cochrane, W.W. (1915). The Shans. Vol. 1. Yangon: Superintendent, Government Printing.
- Goh, Geok Yian (2009). "Myanmar's Relations with China from Tagaung through Hanthawati-Taungngu Periods". In Ho Khai Leong (ed.). Connecting & Distancing: Southeast Asia and China. Institute of Southeast Asian Studies. ISBN 978-981-230-856-6.
- Gutman, Pamela (2001). Burma's Lost Kingdoms: Splendours of Arakan. Bangkok: Orchid Press. ISBN 978-974-8304-98-4.
- Hall, D.G.E. (1960). Burma (3rd ed.). Hutchinson University Library. ISBN 978-1-4067-3503-1.
- Hall, D.G.E. (1961). Historians of South East Asia. London: Oxford University Press.
- Hall, D.G.E. (August 1968). "Review of A History of Burma by Maung Htin Aung". The Journal of Asian Studies. 27 (4). Ann Arbor: The University of Michigan: 909–910. doi:10.2307/2051625. JSTOR 2051625. S2CID 211512934.
- Hardiman, John Percy (1901) [1900]. Sir James George Scott (ed.). Gazetteer of Upper Burma and the Shan States, Part 1. Vol. 1–2. Government of Burma Printing.
- Harvey, G. E. (1925). History of Burma: From the Earliest Times to 10 March 1824. London: Frank Cass & Co. Ltd.
- Royal Historical Commission of Burma (1832). Hmannan Yazawin (in Burmese). Vol. 1–3 (2003 ed.). Yangon: Ministry of Information, Myanmar.
- Hla Pe, U (1985). Burma: Literature, Historiography, Scholarship, Language, Life, and Buddhism. Singapore: Institute of Southeast Asian Studies. ISBN 978-9971-988-00-5.
- Htin Aung, Maung (1967). A History of Burma. New York and London: Cambridge University Press.
- Htin Aung, Maung (1970). Burmese History before 1287: A Defence of the Chronicles. Oxford: The Asoka Society.
- Hudson, Bob (2004). "The Origins of Bagan: The archaeological landscape of Upper Burma to AD 1300". Sydney: University of Sydney.
- Huxley, Andrew (2005). Paul Williams (ed.). "Buddhism and Law: The View from Mandalay". Buddhism: Buddhism in South and Southeast Asia. Taylor & Francis. ISBN 9780415332330.
- "Journal of the Burma Research Society". IG Publishing. Archived from the original on 12 September 2017.
- Kala, U (1724). Maha Yazawin Gyi (in Burmese). Vol. 1–3 (2006, 4th printing ed.). Yangon: Ya-Pyei Publishing.
- Lieberman, Victor B. (September 1986). "How Reliable Is U Kala's Burmese Chronicle? Some New Comparisons". Journal of Southeast Asian Studies. 17 (2). Cambridge University Press: 236–255. doi:10.1017/s002246340000103x. ISBN 978-0-521-80496-7. S2CID 155077963.
- Lieberman, Victor B. (1993). Anthony Reid (ed.). "The Seventeenth Century in Burma: A Watershed?". South East Asia in the Early Modern Era: Trade, Power and Belief. Cornell University Press. ISBN 9780801480935.
- Lieberman, Victor B. (2003). Strange Parallels: Southeast Asia in Global Context, c. 800–1830, volume 1, Integration on the Mainland. Cambridge University Press. ISBN 978-0-521-80496-7.
- Lingat, R. (1950). "Evolution of the Conception of Law in Burma and Siam" (PDF). Journal of the Siam Society. 38 (1). Siam Society Heritage Trust: 13–24.
- Maha Thilawuntha, Shin. Pe Maung Tin (ed.). Yazawin Kyaw (in Burmese) (2006, 4th printing ed.). Yangon: Ya-Pyei Publishing.
- Mangrai, Sao Sai Mong (1981). The Padaeng Chronicle and the Jengtung State Chronicle Translated. Ann Arbor: University of Michigan.
- Moore, Elizabeth H. (2011). McCormick, Patrick; Jenny, Mathias; Baker, Chris (eds.). "The Early Buddhist Archaeology of Myanmar: Tagaung, Thagara, and the Mon-Pyu dichotomy". The Mon over Two Millennia: Monuments, Manuscripts, Movements. Bangkok: Institute of Asian Studies, Chulalongkorn University: 7–23. ISBN 978-616-551-328-9.
- Myint-U, Thant (2006). The River of Lost Footsteps—Histories of Burma. Farrar, Straus and Giroux. ISBN 978-0-374-16342-6.
- Pan Hla, Nai (1968). Razadarit Ayedawbon (in Burmese) (8th printing, 2005 ed.). Yangon: Armanthit Sarpay.
- Phayre, Lt. Gen. Sir Arthur P. (1883). History of Burma (1967 ed.). London: Susil Gupta.
- Raghavan, V. (1979). "Preservation of Palm Leaf and Parabaik Manuscripts and Plan for Compilation of a Union Catalogue of Manuscripts" (PDF). UNESCO.
- Ratchasomphan, Sænluang; David K. Wyatt (1994). David K. Wyatt (ed.). The Nan Chronicle (illustrated ed.). Ithaca: Cornell University SEAP Publications. ISBN 978-0-87727-715-6.
- Sandamala Linkara, Ashin (1931). Rakhine Yazawinthit Kyan (in Burmese). Vol. 1–2 (1997 ed.). Yangon: Tetlan Sarpay.
- Sein Lwin Lay, Kahtika U (2006). Mintaya Shwe Hti and Bayinnaung: Ketumadi Taungoo Yazawin (in Burmese) (2nd printing ed.). Yangon: Yan Aung Sarpay.
- Sein Myint (January 2007). "Writers of Inscriptions and Writers of History". Myanmar Vista Research Magazine (in Burmese). 1 (1). Yangon: 30–34.
- Singer, Noel F. (2008). Vaishali And The Indianization Of Arakan. New Delhi: APH Publishing. ISBN 978-81-313-0405-1.
- Steinberg, David I. (2009). Burma/Myanmar: what everyone needs to know. Oxford University Press. ISBN 978-0-19-539068-1.
- Than Htut, U; U Thaw Kaung (2003). "Myanmar Historical Fiction and Their Historical Context" (PDF). Manusya: Journal of Humanities (3). Bangkok: Chulalongkorn University.
- Than Tun (1964). Studies in Burmese History (in Burmese). Vol. 1. Yangon: Maha Dagon.
- Thaw Kaung, U (2010). Aspects of Myanmar History and Culture. Yangon: Gangaw Myaing.
- Wade, Geoff (2012). "Southeast Asian Historical Writing". In José Rabasa; Masayuki Sato; Edoardo Tortarolo; Daniel Woolf (eds.). The Oxford History of Historical Writing: Volume 3: 1400-1800. Vol. 3 (illustrated ed.). Oxford University Press. p. 752. ISBN 978-0-19-921917-9.
- Woolf, Daniel (2011). A Global History of History (reissue, illustrated ed.). Cambridge, UK: Cambridge University Press. ISBN 978-0-521-69908-2.
- Wyatt, David K. (1998). Chiang Mai Chronicle. Ithaca: Cornell University SEAP Publications.
- Zon Pann Pwint (9 May 2011). "Uphill fight to preserve palm leaf texts". The Myanmar Times. Yangon. Archived from the original on 14 May 2014.
- Zon Pann Pwint (15 August 2011). "Scholar updates 200-year-old poem". The Myanmar Times. Yangon.
