= Hsinbyushin Ayedawbon =

18th-century Burmese chronicle

- Author: Letwe Nawrahta
- Original title: ဆင်ဖြူရှင် အရေးတော်ပုံ
- Language: Burmese
- Series: Burmese chronicles
- Genre: Chronicle, History
- Publication date: 1786–1791
- Publication place: Kingdom of Burma

Hsinbyushin Ayedawbon (Burmese: ဆင်ဖြူရှင် အရေးတော်ပုံ) is an 18th-century Burmese chronicle of the first four years of King Bodawpaya of the Konbaung dynasty. Despite the name Hsinbyushin, it is not the chronicle of Bodawpaya's famous brother King Hsinbyushin.

The chronicle covers the early reign up to 1786, and consists of 74 palm leaves with 12 lines to a leaf. It provides a detailed account of how the new capital of Amarapura was built, the 1784–1785 Arakan campaign under Crown Prince Thado Minsaw, and how the Mahamuni Buddha was brought back to Amarapura. Moreover, it includes the palace customs, including how royal appurtenances were arranged, court dresses, etc., which are not found in the main chronicles.

== Bibliography ==
- Thaw Kaung, U (2010). Aspects of Myanmar History and Culture. Yangon: Gangaw Myaing.
