= Pagan Yazawin Thit =

Yaza Wunthalini Pagan Yazawin Thit
- Author: U Bhe
- Original title: ပုဂံ ရာဇဝင်သစ်
- Language: Burmese
- Series: Burmese chronicles
- Genre: Chronicle, History
- Publication date: 19th century
- Publication place: Kingdom of Burma

Yaza Wunthalini (Burmese: ရာဇဝံသဇာလိနီ; Pali: Rājavaṃsajālinī) or more commonly known as Pagan Yazawin Thit (Burmese: ပုဂံ ရာဇဝင်သစ်; lit. 'New Chronicle of Pagan') is a 19th-century Burmese chronicle that covers the history of the Pagan Dynasty.

== Bibliography ==
- Goh, Geok Yian (2009). "Myanmar's Relations with China from Tagaung through Hanthawati-Taungngu Periods". In Ho Khai Leong (ed.). Connecting & Distancing: Southeast Asia and China. Institute of Southeast Asian Studies. ISBN 9789812308566.
