= Lik Amin Asah =

- Language: Mon
- Series: Burmese chronicles
- Genre: Chronicle, History
- Publication date: 1825
- Publication place: Kingdom of Burma

Lik Amin Asah is a Mon language chronicle that strictly covers the legendary early history of its kings and founding of the city of Hanthawaddy Pegu (Bago). It was written in 1825 during the First Anglo-Burmese War.

== Bibliography ==
- Aung-Thwin, Michael A. (2005). The Mists of Rāmañña: The Legend that was Lower Burma (illustrated ed.). Honolulu: University of Hawai'i Press. ISBN 9780824828868.
- Wade, Geoff (2012). "Southeast Asian Historical Writing". In José Rabasa; Masayuki Sato; Edoardo Tortarolo; Daniel Woolf (eds.). The Oxford History of Historical Writing: Volume 3: 1400-1800. Vol. 3 (illustrated ed.). Oxford University Press. p. 752. ISBN 9780199219179.
