= Gavampati (Buddha's disciple) =

Enlightened monastic disciple of Lord Buddha

Gavampati Thera

Personal life
- Born: Varanasi
- Known for: One of the first ten disciples of Gautama Buddha
- Occupation: Monk

Religious life
- Religion: Buddhism

Senior posting
- Teacher: Gautama Buddha

Gavāṃpati was one of the earliest disciples of the Gautama Buddha and is considered one of the 80 great disciples in early Buddhism. He was among the first ten monks to be ordained and to attain the state of Arhat.

== Legacy ==
In Southeast Asia, particularly in Thailand, Laos, Cambodia, and the Shan States, Gavāṃpati became a highly venerated figure. In Thailand, he is often represented in amulet form as Phra Pidta. Among the Mon people, the cult of Gavāṃpati has survived for centuries and remains a significant aspect of regional Buddhist devotion.
