= Gavampati (chronicle) =

1710 Burmese chronicle

- Language: Mon
- Series: Burmese chronicles
- Genre: Chronicle, History
- Publication date: c. 1710 to c. 1820s
- Publication place: Toungoo Dynasty, Konbaung Dynasty, or British Burma

Gavampati (Burmese: ဂဝံပတိ; Pali: Gavaṃpati) is a supplementary Mon language chronicle that covers legendary early history. H.L. Shorto dates the only extant palm-leaf manuscript to c. 1710, and translated it into English in his article called "Gavampati Tradition." (Note: (Aung-Thwin 2005: 419): Shorto's translation as of 2005 had not been published. Aung-Thwin referenced a typescript copy in possession of Prof. Victor L. Lieberman, University of Michigan.) However Michael Aung-Thwin points out some of the terms in the text are decidedly early 19th century, and some or all of Gavampati may have been added during or shortly after First Anglo-Burmese War (1824–1826).

== Bibliography ==
- Aung-Thwin, Michael A. (2005). The Mists of Rāmañña: The Legend that was Lower Burma (illustrated ed.). Honolulu: University of Hawai'i Press. ISBN 9780824828868.
