= Yazawin Kyaw =

16th-century Burmese Buddhist chronicle

- Author: Shin Maha Silavamsa
- Original title: ရာဇဝင် ကျော်
- Language: Burmese
- Series: Burmese chronicles
- Genre: Chronicle, History
- Publication date: 1502 (Part I); 1520 (Part II)
- Publication place: Ava Kingdom

Maha Thanmada Wuntha (Burmese: မဟာသမ္မတဝံသ, IPA: [məhà θàɰ̃məda̰ wʊ̀ɰ̃θa̰]; Pali: Mahā Sammata Vaṃsa) or more commonly known as Yazawin Kyaw (Burmese: ရာဇဝင် ကျော်, [jàzəwɪ̀ɰ̃ tɕɔ̀]; the Celebrated Chronicle) is an early 16th-century chronicle of Buddhist religious history and Burmese history. It is recognized as the earliest extant chronicle in Burmese history despite not being the first one in line.

The chronicle was written in two parts by Shin Maha Silavamsa, the famous learned monk, author and poet. The first part, written in 1502, is mainly a religious history document, and essentially a Burmese version of the Mahavamsa and Dipavamsa. The first part focuses on the kings of ancient India and Ceylon, according to Buddhist mythology and history. In 1520, the author added a supplement about the Burmese kings down to 1496. In all, only one-seventh of the treatise concerns the affairs of Burmese kings as it was not intended to be an authoritative chronicle. The author stated there was already an existing chronicle of the Ava court.

== Bibliography ==
- Aung-Thwin, Michael A. (2005). The Mists of Rāmañña: The Legend that was Lower Burma (illustrated ed.). Honolulu: University of Hawai'i Press. ISBN 9780824828868.
- Charney, Michael W. (2006). Powerful Learning: Buddhist Literati and the Throne in Burma's Last Dynasty, 1752–1885. Ann Arbor: University of Michigan.
- Hla Pe, U (1985). Burma: Literature, Historiography, Scholarship, Language, Life, and Buddhism. Singapore: Institute of Southeast Asian Studies. ISBN 9789971988005.
- Maha Thilawuntha, Shin (1928). Pe Maung Tin (ed.). Yazawin Kyaw (in Burmese) (4th printing, 2010 ed.). Yangon: Burma Research Society (original publisher), Ya-Pyei (4th printing).
