= Rakhine Razawin Haung =

- Original title: ရခိုင် ရာဇဝင်ဟောင်း
- Language: Arakanese
- Series: Burmese chronicles
- Genre: Chronicle, History
- Publication date: c. 1775
- Publication place: Arakan

Min Razagri Aredaw Sadan (Burmese: မင်းရာဇာကြီးအရေးစာတမ်း), or more commonly known as Rakhine Razawin Haung (Burmese: ရခိုင် ရာဇဝင်ဟောင်း), is an Arakanese (Rakhine) chronicle covering the history of Arakan.

== Bibliography ==
- Charney, Michael W. (2004). "From Exclusion to Assimilation: Late Precolonial Burmese Literati and "Burman-ness"" (Document). London: SOAS.
