= Alaung Mintayagyi Ayedawbon =

Burmese historical chronicle

Mintayagyi Ayedawbon
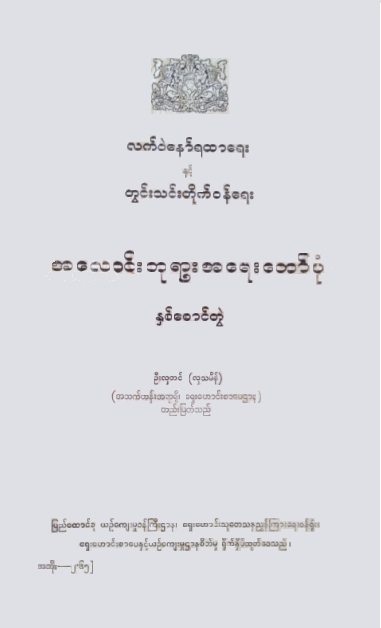
- Cover of 1961 publication of both versions
- Author: Letwe Nawrahta or Twinthin Taikwun Maha Sithu
- Original title: အလောင်းဘုရား အရေးတော်ပုံ
- Language: Burmese
- Series: Burmese chronicles
- Genre: Chronicle, History
- Publication date: 1752–1760; 1961 (first publication)
- Publication place: Kingdom of Burma

Alaung Mintayagyi Ayedawbon (Burmese: အလောင်း မင်းတရားကြီး အရေးတော်ပုံ, also known as Alaungpaya Ayedawbon (Burmese: အလောင်းဘုရား အရေးတော်ပုံ), is one of two biographic chronicles of King Alaungpaya of Konbaung Dynasty. Both versions trace the king's life from his purported ancestry from King Sithu II of Pagan Dynasty down to his death from an illness from his campaign against Siam in 1760. Both contains many details, though not all the same, of the king's 8-year reign.

Scholarship agrees that both chronicles are contemporary accounts of the king by his ministers but does not agree on the authorship. Both versions were kept at the Royal Library of the last two Konbaung kings, Mindon and Thibaw. According to U Yan, the Royal Librarian, one version is by Letwe Nawrahta and the other is by Twinthin Taikwun Maha Sithu. One of the versions was published in 1883, and again in 1900 as Alaungpaya Ayedawbon.

The second version was first published only in 1961, alongside the first version, with both versions under names Alaung Mintayagyi Ayedawbon and Alaungpaya Ayedawbon. According to the editor of the 1961 edition Hla Thamein, the second version was written by Letwe Nawrahta. But historian Yi Yi disagrees, after a careful side-by-side comparison of both texts, stating that both versions were written by Twinthin Taikwun. Another scholar, Kyauk Taing, who like Yi Yi made a side-by-side analysis agrees with Yi Yi and Hla Thamein about the 1883 version but disagrees with them that Twinthin or Letwe Nawrahta wrote the 1961 version.

== Bibliography ==
- Thaw Kaung, U (2010). Aspects of Myanmar History and Culture. Yangon: Gangaw Myaing.
- Letwe Nawrahta and Twinthin Taikwun (c. 1760). Hla Thamein (ed.). Alaungpaya Ayedawbon (in Burmese) (1961 ed.). Ministry of Culture, Union of Burma.
