= Traditional games of Myanmar =

Myanmar has a number of traditional games, sports, and martial arts. Some of these games were designed to teach people how to protect themselves and their communities.

== Traditional games ==
=== Chinlone ===
Chinlone (Burmese: ခြင်းလုံး, pronounced [t͡ɕʰɪ́ɰ̃.lóʊɰ̃]), also known as caneball, is the traditional national sport of Myanmar (Burma). It is non-competitive, typically with six people playing together as one team. The ball used is normally made from hand-woven rattan, which sounds like a basket when hit. Similar to the game of hacky-sack, chinlone is played by individuals passing the ball among each other within a circle without using their hands. However, in chinlone, players walk while passing the ball, with one player in the center of the circle. The point of the game is to keep the ball from hitting the ground while passing it back and forth as creatively as possible. The sport of chinlone is played by men, women, and children, interchangeably and often together. Although very fast, chinlone is meant to be entertaining and fluid, as if it were more of a performance or dance.

=== Phankhon ===
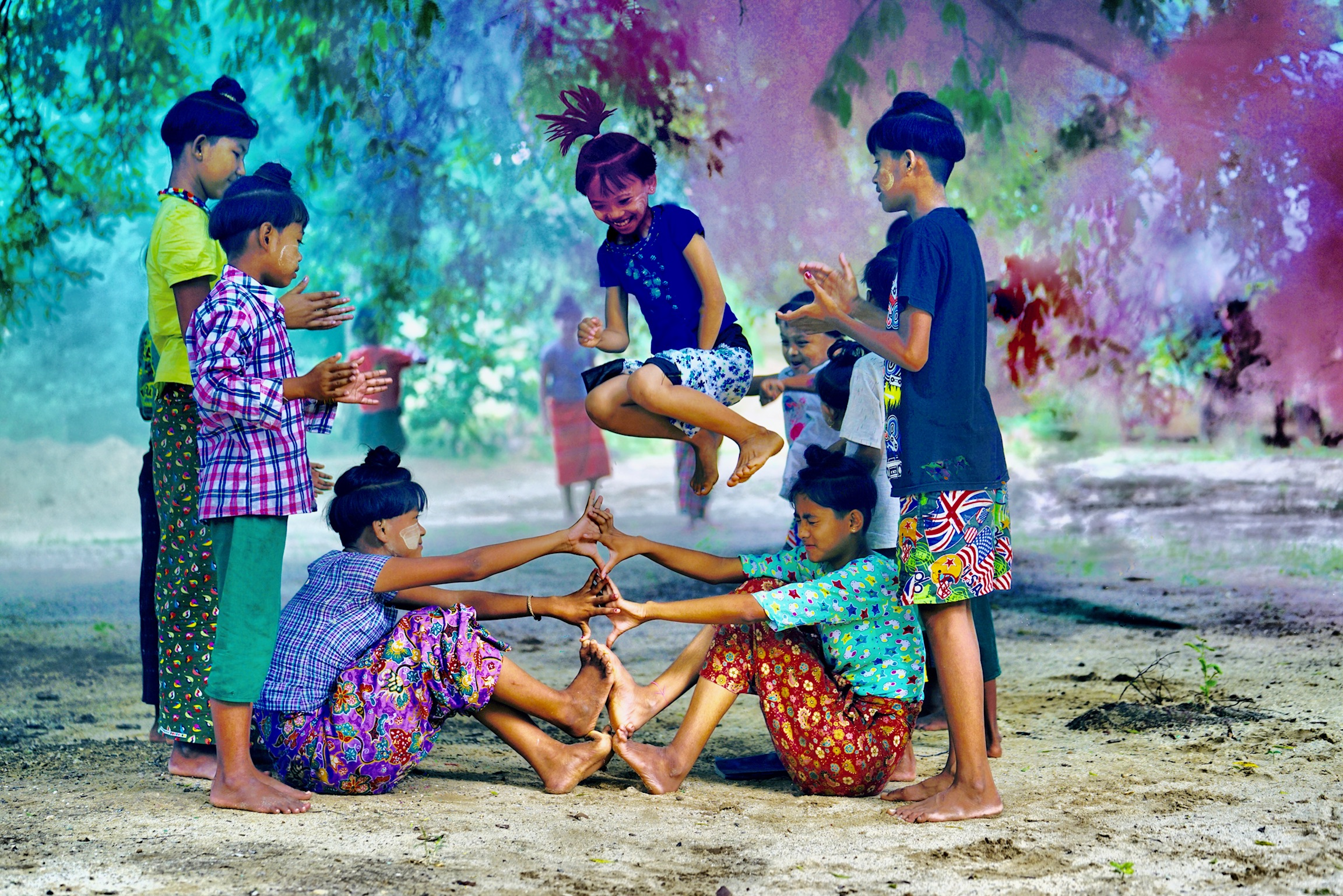
Children of Set Set Yo Village in Myanmar demonstrating the fifth and final round of phankhon, or "High Jump Game." This traditional game is played by children in Myanmar. A similar game called Luksong tinik is played by Filipino children.

Phankhon (Burmese: ဖန်ခုန်တမ်း) is a traditional children's game in Myanmar. The game is played mostly by girls, though young boys will sometimes join in. Phankhon requires two teams comprising four to five players. There is an offensive team and a defending team. The offensive team must hop on one leg over five different human obstacles created by the “defending” team. With each round, the defending team adds an obstacle to make the jumps higher.

=== Gaung ohn yite ===
In this game, two opponents sit on a bar elevated above the ground and attempt to knock each other off by hitting each other with a pillow.

== Variations of tag ==
=== Zum-zum ===
There are two players on each team in this traditional game of Myanmar. The defenders can not tackle the raider in this variant; they can only attempt to tag the raider before the raider escapes. If the raider escapes without executing or receiving a tag, then the game continues with the other side raiding.

=== Htote si toe ===
Htote si toe (meaning "border-crossing game") is a tag game in which offensive players attempt to cross the lines of a narrow field without being tagged by defenders standing on those lines.

== Martial arts ==
=== Lethwei ===
Let-hwei or Lek Whay (UK: /ˈlɛk hweɪ/ or US: /ˈlɛk weɪ/, LEH-k way ; Burmese: လက်ဝှေ့, IPA: [lɛʔ.ʍḛ]), also called Burmese boxing, is a full contact combat sport originating from Myanmar and is considered one of the most brutal martial arts in the world. Lethwei fighters use stand-up striking techniques such as kicks, knees, elbows and punches. The use of headbutts is also permitted. Fighters compete bareknuckle, wrapping their hands with only tape and gauze. Disallowed in most combat sports, headbutts are important weapons in a Lethwei fighter's arsenal, giving Lethwei its name of the "Art of nine limbs". In traditional rules, each corner is allowed one two-minute timeout per fight to revive a KO’d fighter. This, combined with its bareknuckle nature, gave Lethwei a reputation for being one of the bloodiest and most violent martial arts. Although popular throughout Myanmar, Lethwei has been primarily and historically associated with the Karen people of the Kayin State; the vast majority of competitive Lethwei fighters are ethnolinguistically of Karen descent.

=== Naban ===
Naban (Burmese: နပန်း, pronounced [nəbáɰ̃]) is a traditional form of grappling from Myanmar. Naban is integrated into other fighting styles instead of existing as a separate martial art. Originally based on Indian wrestling, it is practiced primarily in rural areas. Naban is especially popular among the Kachin and Chin people who have Himalayan origins. Techniques include joint locks, strikes to pressure points, palm strikes, foot strikes and chokeholds. All parts of the opponent's body are legal targets.

=== Kyin ===
Kyin (Burmese: ကျင်) is a form of wrestling from Myanmar. It is practiced by the Rakhine people in Myanmar. Tournaments of this sport are usually held during big occasions, for example, Rakhine State Day events.

In Kyin wrestling tournaments, practitioners usually put on a display of warming-up dancing, which is called "kyin kwin" in the local language. Then the fighting begins. The rules are simple. No punching. No touching on the face, and no attacking below the belt. The wrestler who throws his opponent to the ground a fixed number of times wins.

The walls near the cave of Shite-thaung Temple which was built in 1531 show early depiction of the sport of kyin wrestling.

== Board games ==
=== Sittuyin ===
Sittuyin (Burmese: စစ်တုရင်), also known as Burmese chess, is a strategy board game created in Myanmar. It is a direct offspring of the Indian game of chaturanga, which arrived in Myanmar in the 8th century thus it is part of the same family of games such as chess and shogi. Sit is the modern Burmese word for "army" or "war"; the word sittuyin can be translated as "representation of the four characteristics of army"—chariot, elephant, cavalry and infantry.

In its native land, the game has been largely overshadowed by Western (international) chess, although it remains popular in the northwestern regions.

== Equestrian sports ==
=== Polo ===
Polo is a stick and ball game that is played on horseback as a traditional field sport, and is one of the oldest known team sports in the world.

Polo was popular among royals in Myanmar, as evidenced by historical illustrations.

== See also ==
- Traditional games of South Asia
