= Rakhine people =

Ethnic group in Myanmar

ရခိုင်လူမျိုး (Rakhine)
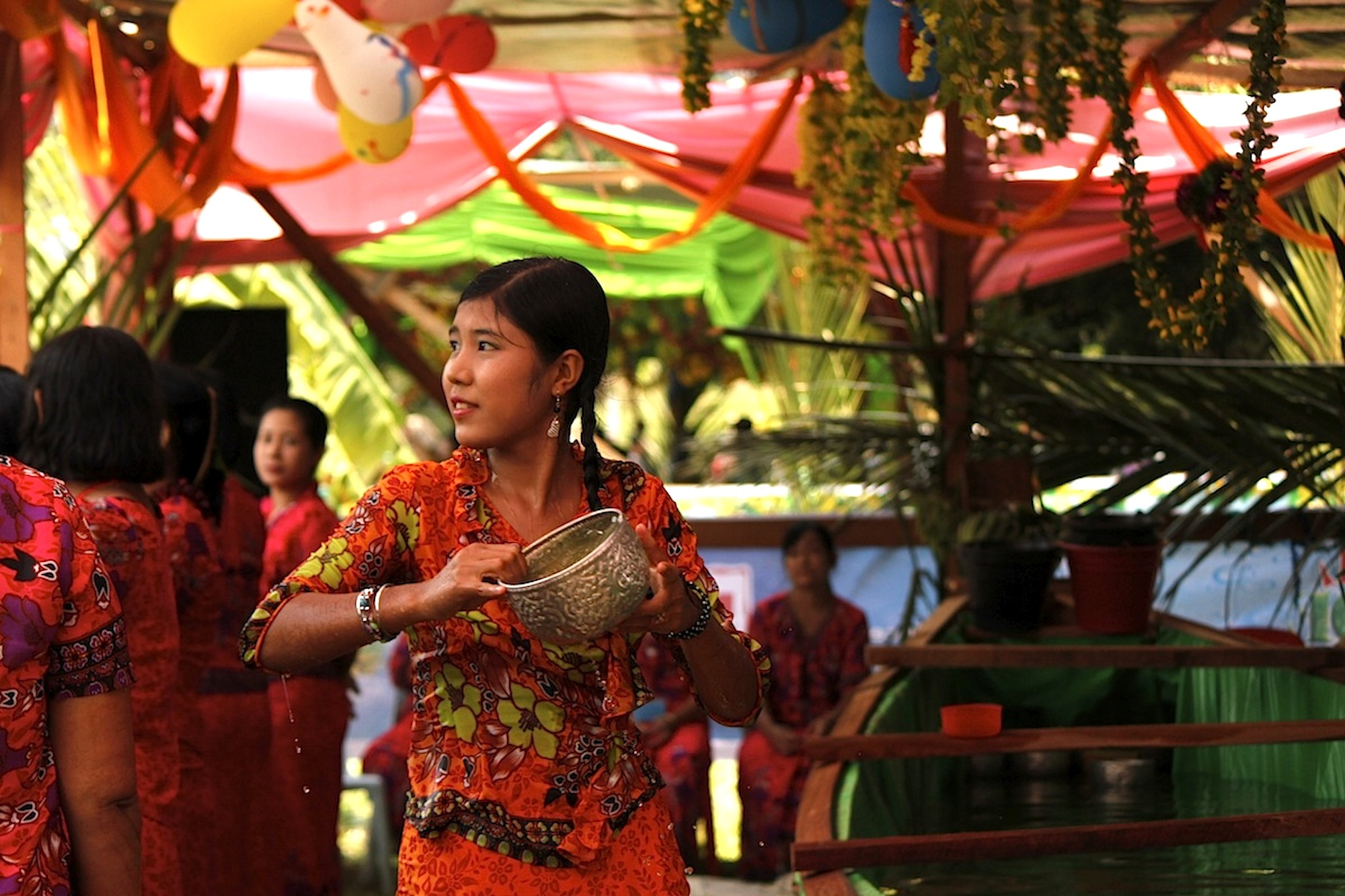
- A Rakhine girl tosses water at revellers during the Thingyan.

Regions with significant populations
- Myanmar: 2,000,000 (2019)
- India: 50,000
- Bangladesh: 11,195
- Malaysia: 10,000
- United States: 2,603

Languages
- Rakhine, Burmese

Religion
- Theravada Buddhism

Related ethnic groups
- Bamar; Marma; Kamein; Danu; Intha; Achang; Taungyo; Other Tibeto-Burman-speaking peoples

- People: Rakhain lu-myo
- Language: Rakhain batha (ရခိုင်လူမျိုး)
- Country: Rakhine, Myanmar

The Rakhine (Burmese and Rakhine: ရခိုင်လူမျိုး) or Arakanese are a Southeast Asian ethnic group in Myanmar (Burma) forming the majority along the coastal region of present-day Rakhine State (formerly called Arakan), although Rakhine communities also exist throughout the country, particularly in the Ayeyarwady and Yangon Regions. They constitute approximately 4.61% or more of Myanmar's total population. Rakhine communities also exist in Bangladesh's Chittagong Hill Tracts and India's Northeastern states.

The Rakhine people consist of seven different ethnic groups: Rakhine, Kamein, Kwe Myi, Daingnet, Maramagyi, Mru and Thet. Among them, the Rakhine are the majority in Rakhine State and have long been influenced by their proximity to India and have formed trading links with the subcontinent. The Thet, Kamein, Daingnet and Marma are the minority ethnic groups living in the hills.

The Rakhines are predominantly Theravada Buddhist. Their language contains similarities with the Burmese language and they are very close to Burma in culture and traditional dress. They have developed their own kingdoms, dynasties, scripts, coins, costumes, culture, and dialects.

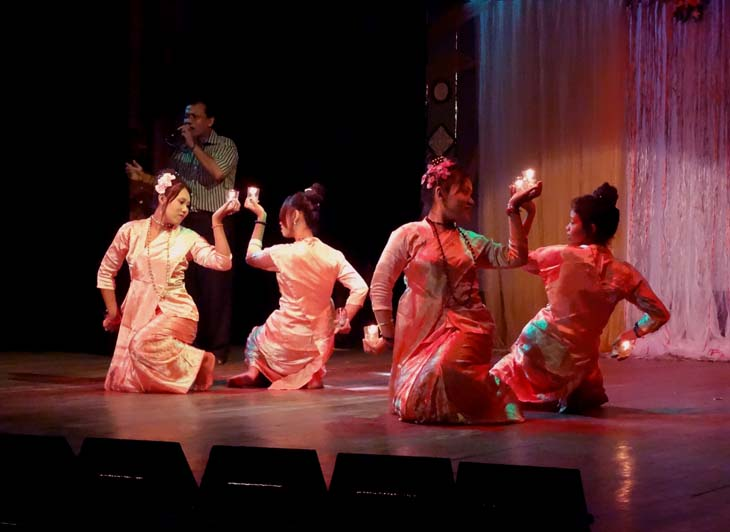
Marma dancers

The Rakhine people have a variety of appearances, showing a mix of traits from both South Asian and East Asian backgrounds. Rakhine men mostly wear a sarong called lungyi, while the women also wear a sarong called thabein. The Rakhine people celebrate several key festivals including Sangrain and Buddha Purnima.

== Ethnonyms ==
"Rakhine" (less commonly spelt Rakhaing) is the contemporary ethnonym and name of the region in Rakhine, Burmese, and English today. The word is extant to the mid-11th century, appearing on a pillar inscription at Shite-thaung Temple, and also appears in European, Persian, and Ceylonese accounts by the 15th century.

The term Rakhine may have come from the Pali word "Rakkhapura" from "Rakkhita" meaning the land of the people of Rakhasa (Rakhasa > Rakkha > Rakkhaing > Rakhaing) who were given this name in honor of their preservation of their national heritage and ethics or morality. The word Rakhine means, "one who maintains his own race." In the Rakhine language, the land is called Rakhinepray, the ethnic Rakhine are called Rakhinetha.

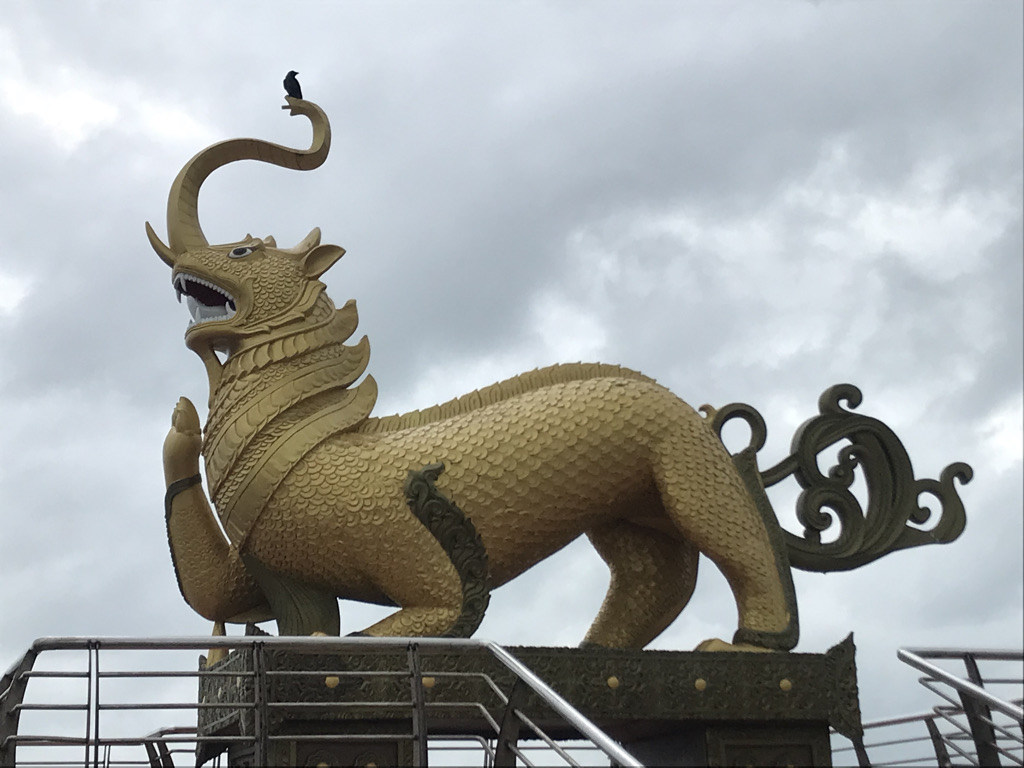
Statue of Nawarupa in Sittwe, chimeric creature in Rakhine mythology.

U Kala's Maha Yazawin traces the word's etymology to Alaungsithu's conquest of the region during the Pagan era, but epigraphic evidence to support the underlying theory remains scant. Arthur Phayre traces the etymology to the Sanskrit or Pali words for 'monster' or 'demon' (rākṣasa and rakkhasa) respectively, which is more likely. Some Rakhine inhabitants now prefer the alternative spelling of ရက္ခိုင်.

Between the 17th and 18th centuries, the Rakhine began calling themselves Mranma (မြန်မာ) and its derivatives, as attested by texts like the Rakhine Minrazagri Ayedaw Sadan and the Dhanyawaddy Ayedawbon. The word, which is also cognate with Bamar and is the Rakhine pronunciation of "Myanmar," continues to be used by their descendants in Bangladesh, who are known as the Marma. By this period, the Bamar began to call the Rakhine the Myanmagyi (မြန်မာကြီး; lit. 'great Mranma / Myanma'), as attested by contemporaneous Burmese and foreign sources. The ethnonym reflected their common ancestral kinship ties with the Buddhist-professing Bamar, with whom the Rakhine identified.

By 1585, European, Persian, and Bengali accounts began describing the Rakhine and Buddhist groups like Barua people as the Magh and its derivatives (e.g., Mogh, Mugh, Mog, etc.). The word's etymology is likely to derive from Magadha, the name of an ancient Buddhist kingdom. The term Magh (or Mog) has historically been used in Bengali accounts to refer to the Marma people and the Arakanese/Rakhine. With the rise of the Shunga dynasty and the decline of Buddhism in Magadha, many local Buddhists are believed to have migrated east, settling between Chittagong and the Arakan Yoma mountains. This eventually lead to the growth of the Arakan Kingdom, which expanded into Chittagong.

British authorities adopted the ethnonym Arakanese for the Rakhines by the late 19th century. After 1991, the Burmese government changed the official English name of the ethnic group to Rakhine, as part of a broader effort to indigenize the country's English ethnonyms and place names.

== History of Rakhine ==
The Rakhine State, also known as Arakan, in Myanmar is the home to the Rakhine people. The history of Rakhine is divided into seven parts – the independent kingdoms of Dhanyawadi, Waithali, Lemro, Mrauk U, Burmese occupation from 1785 to 1826, British rule from 1826 to 1948 and as a part of independent Burma from 1948.

=== Ancient Kingdoms (4th century CE – 1429) ===
Dhanyawadi is considered the first Kingdom of Arakan. The earliest recorded evidence indicates that the kingdom was established around the 4th century CE. It served as a significant cultural and political center in the region. The kingdom was known for its flourishing trade, connecting Southeast Asia with the Indian subcontinent. According to legends, the Gautama Buddha is said to have visited the city of Dhanyawadi during his travels to spread Buddhism in 554 BC. The remnants of Dhanyawadi's architecture and artifacts offer insights into the early history and society of Arakan.

It is later estimated that the Arakanese world shifted from Dhanyawadi kingdom to Waithali kingdom (which was a part of Chandra dynasty). The Anandachandra Inscription, dated to 729 AD, reveals that the people of the Waithali Kingdom practiced Mahayana Buddhism.

King Min Hti is one of the famous Arakan kings, known for being one of the longest reigning monarchs in world history, although the exact length of his reign is unknown. During the Le-Mro period (818–1406), it is known that he ruled the Launggyet Dynasty of Arakan from c. 1279 to 1373/74.

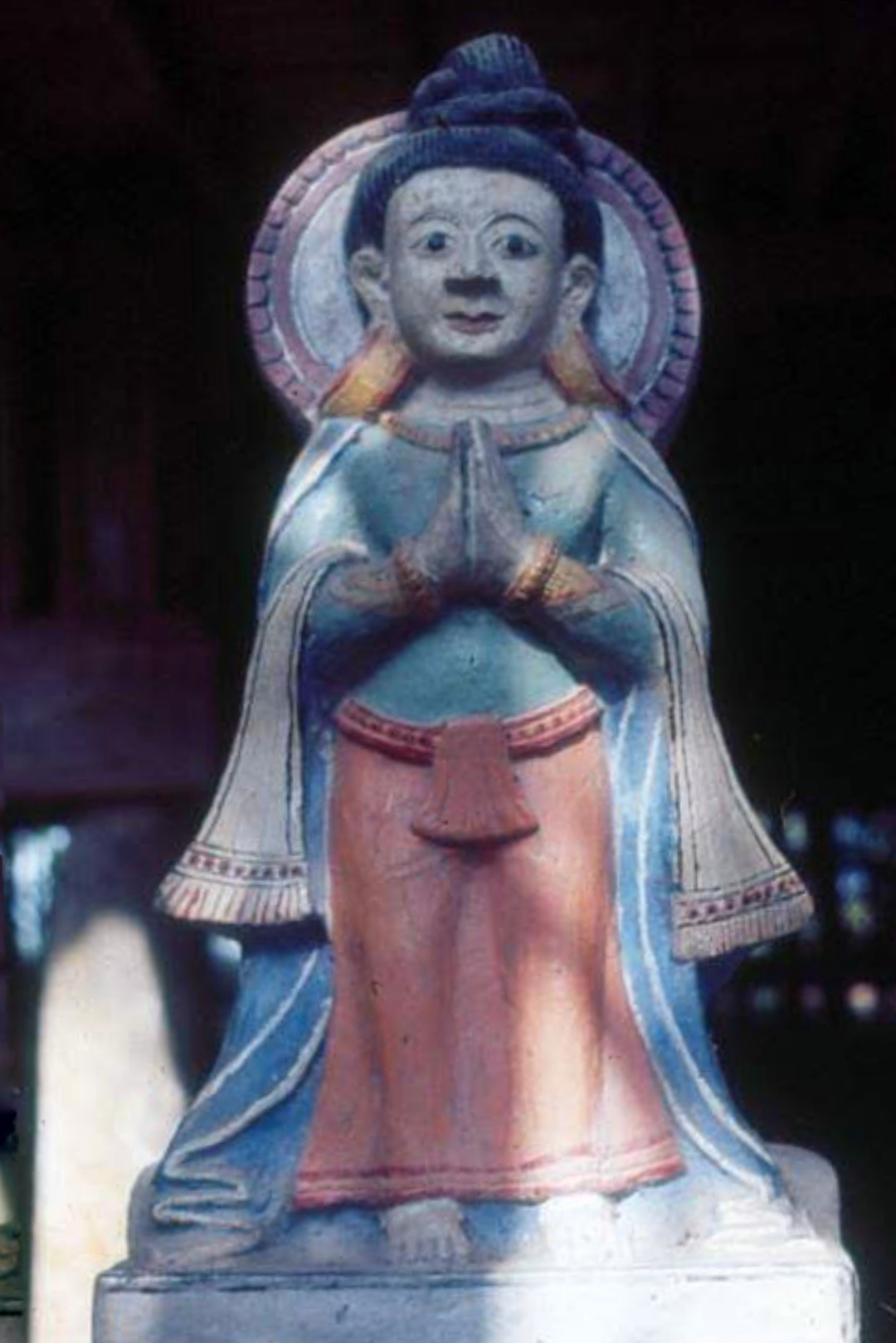
King Min Hti of Arakan

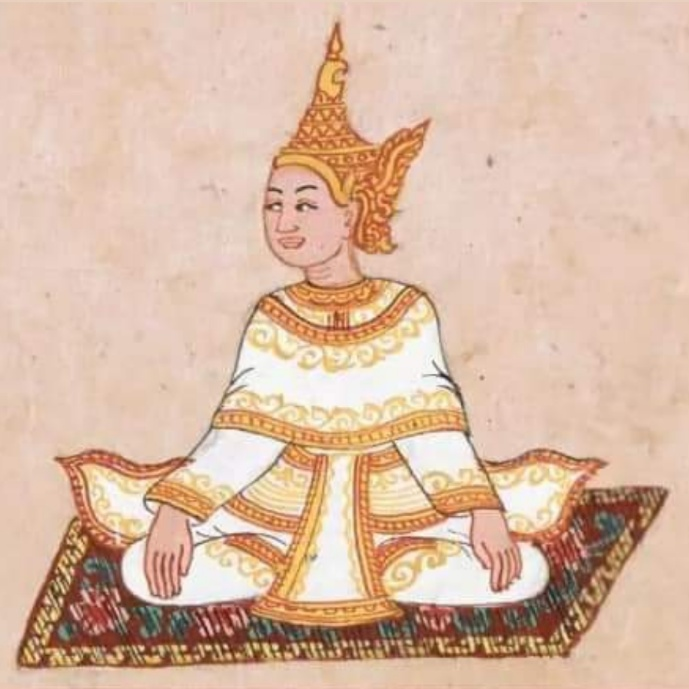
Maha Thammada, the last king of Arakan

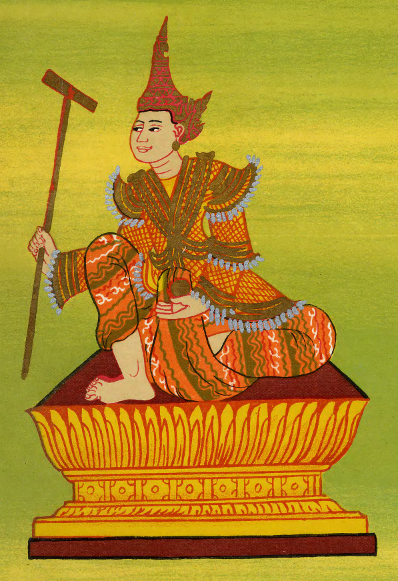
Anawrahta, king of Launggyet Arakan

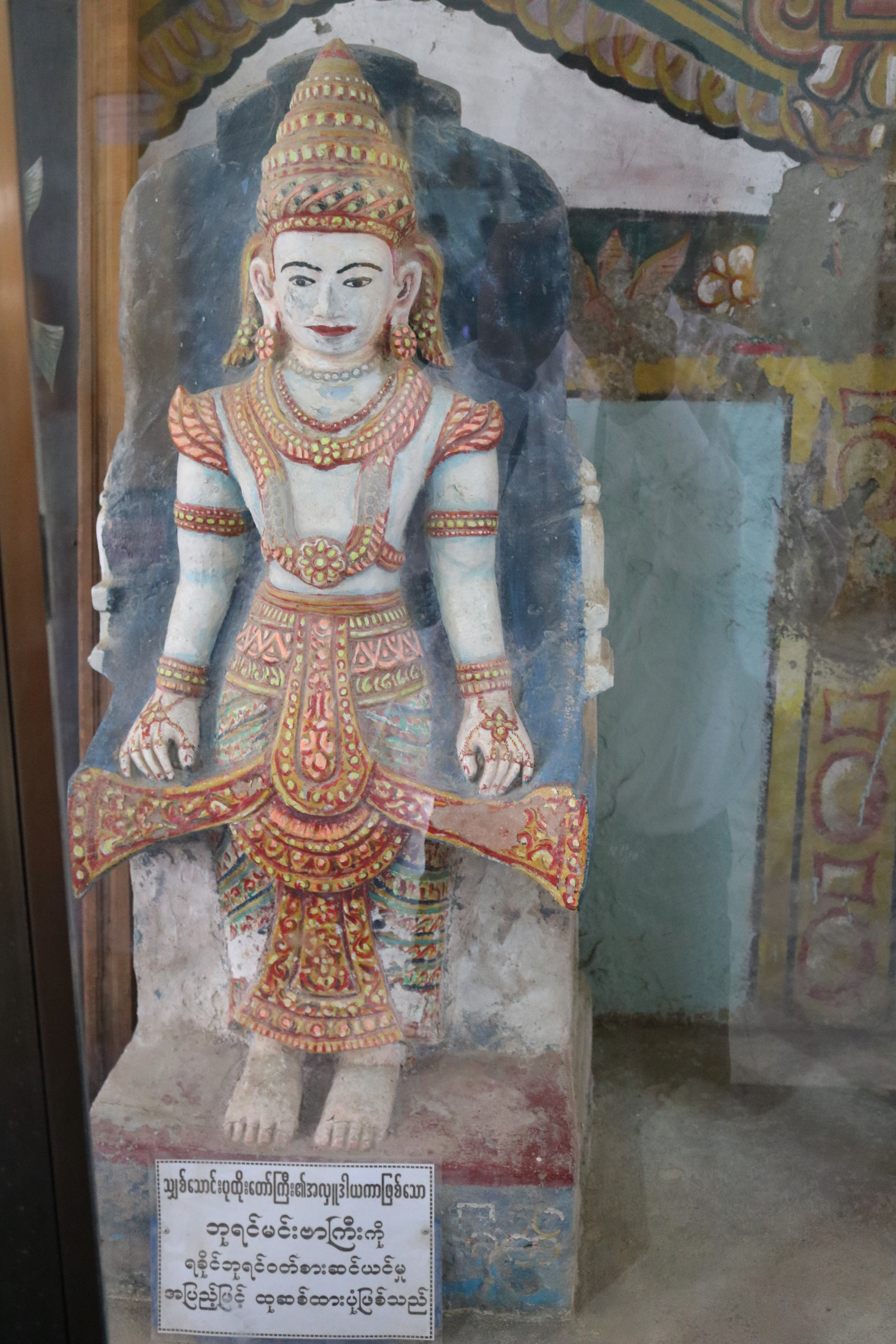
King Min Bin Statue

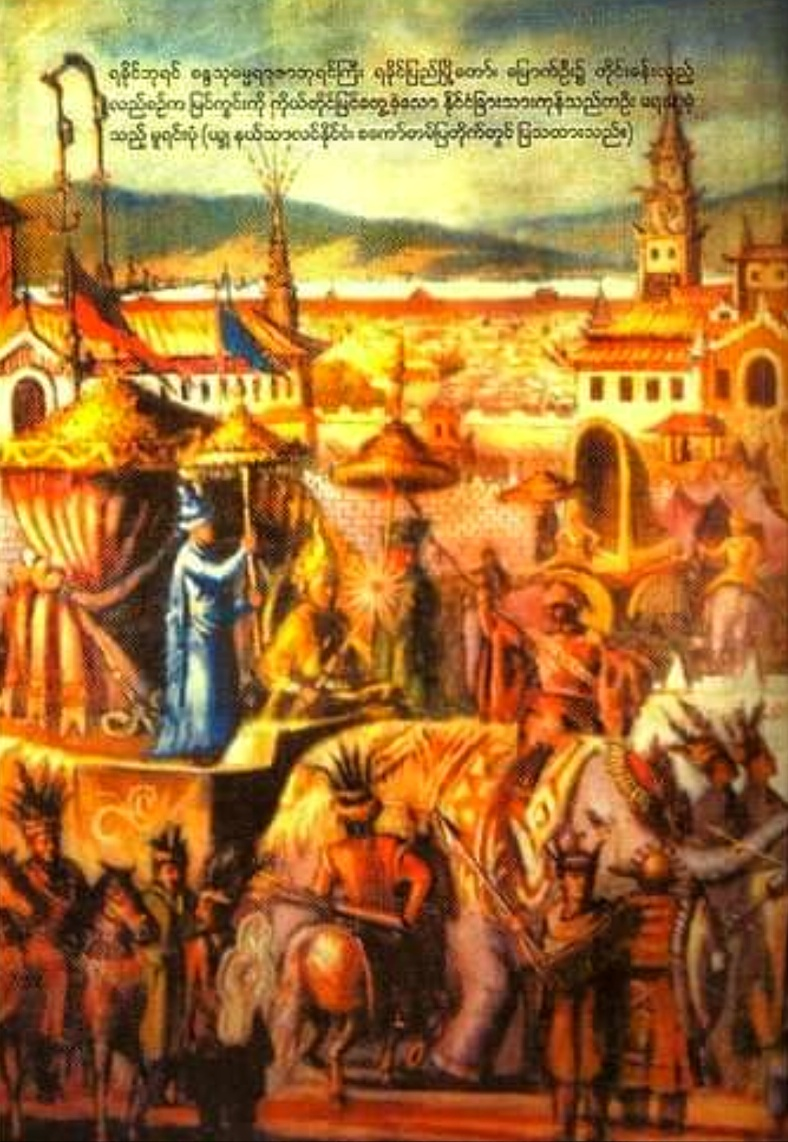
King Sanda Thudhamma of Arakan.

The Arakan kingdoms have always been predominantly Buddhist, with the majority known today as the Rakhine people. Although some of the kings had Muslim titles (nicknames) during the Kingdom of Mrauk U, as it was under Bengal Sultanate influence, none of them adopted the religion; they remained as Buddhists.

=== Mrauk-U Kingdom (1429–1785) ===
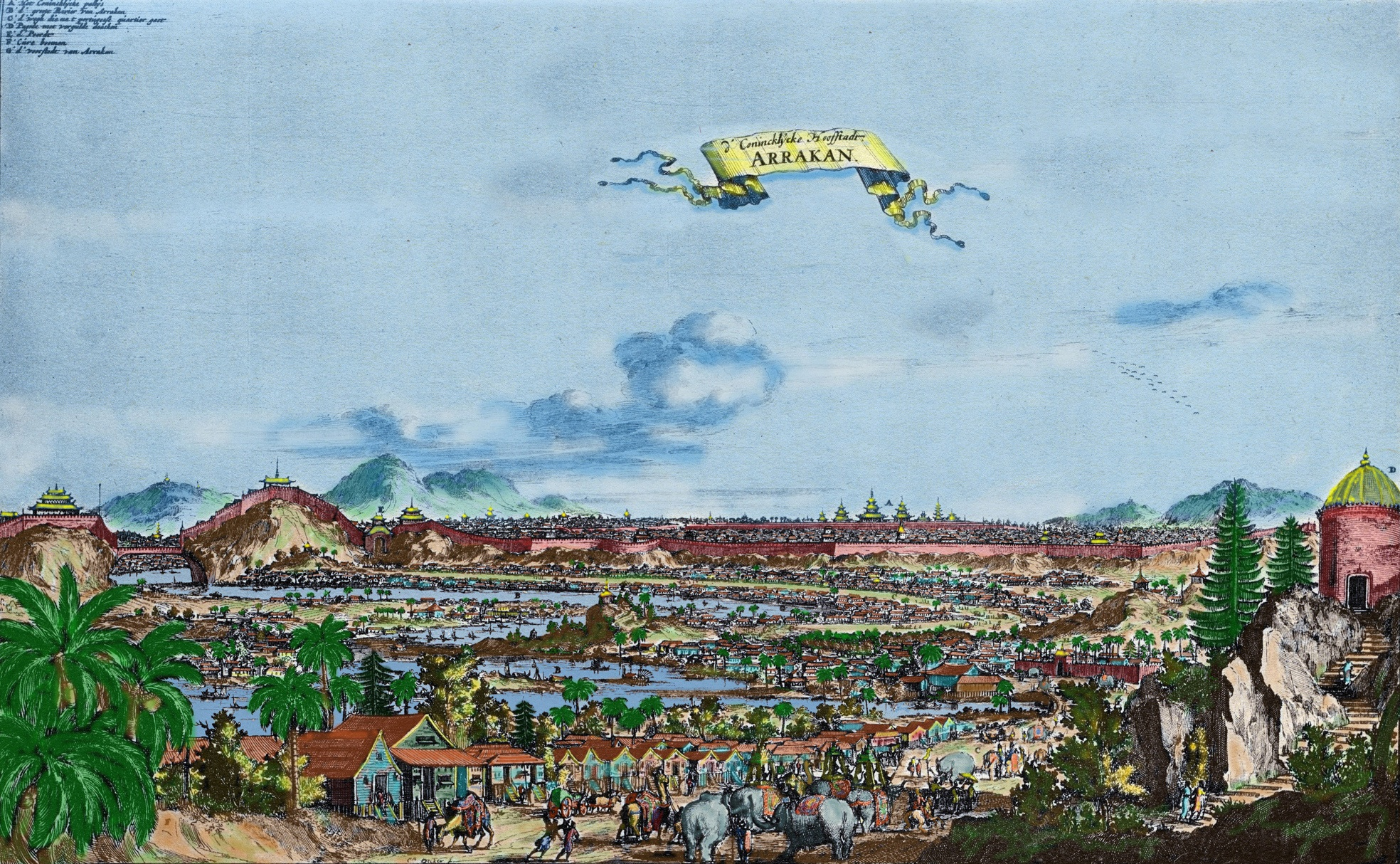
View of Mrauk-U in 17th century

The Kingdom of Mrauk U was the largest kingdom of the Arakan (Rakhine) Kingdom, encompassing the Chittagong region of Bangladesh and the Rakhine State of Myanmar. Arakanese chronicle records that more than six million shrines and pagodas flourished in Mrauk-U. A British archaeologist, Emil Forchhammer noted that "in durability, architectural skill, and ornamentation the Mrauk-U temples far surpass those on the banks of Irrawaddy." Illustrative examples of Mrauk U period architecture include the Shite-thaung and Htukkanthein Temples.

Mrauk-U Kingdom started initially as a part of the Bengal Sultanate from 1429 to 1437 and later they got independence from Bengal. Chittagong was later conquered by Mrauk-U Kingdom around 1542. The kingdom gained full control over the Bay of Bengal coastline. However, in 1666, after a war with the Mughal Empire, it lost control of Chittagong. The Arakanese king Min Razagyi (ruling 1593–1612) conquered the areas and styled himself as the highest and most powerful king of Arakan, Chacomas, and Bengal in a 1607 letter to Portuguese mercenary Filipe de Brito e Nicote.

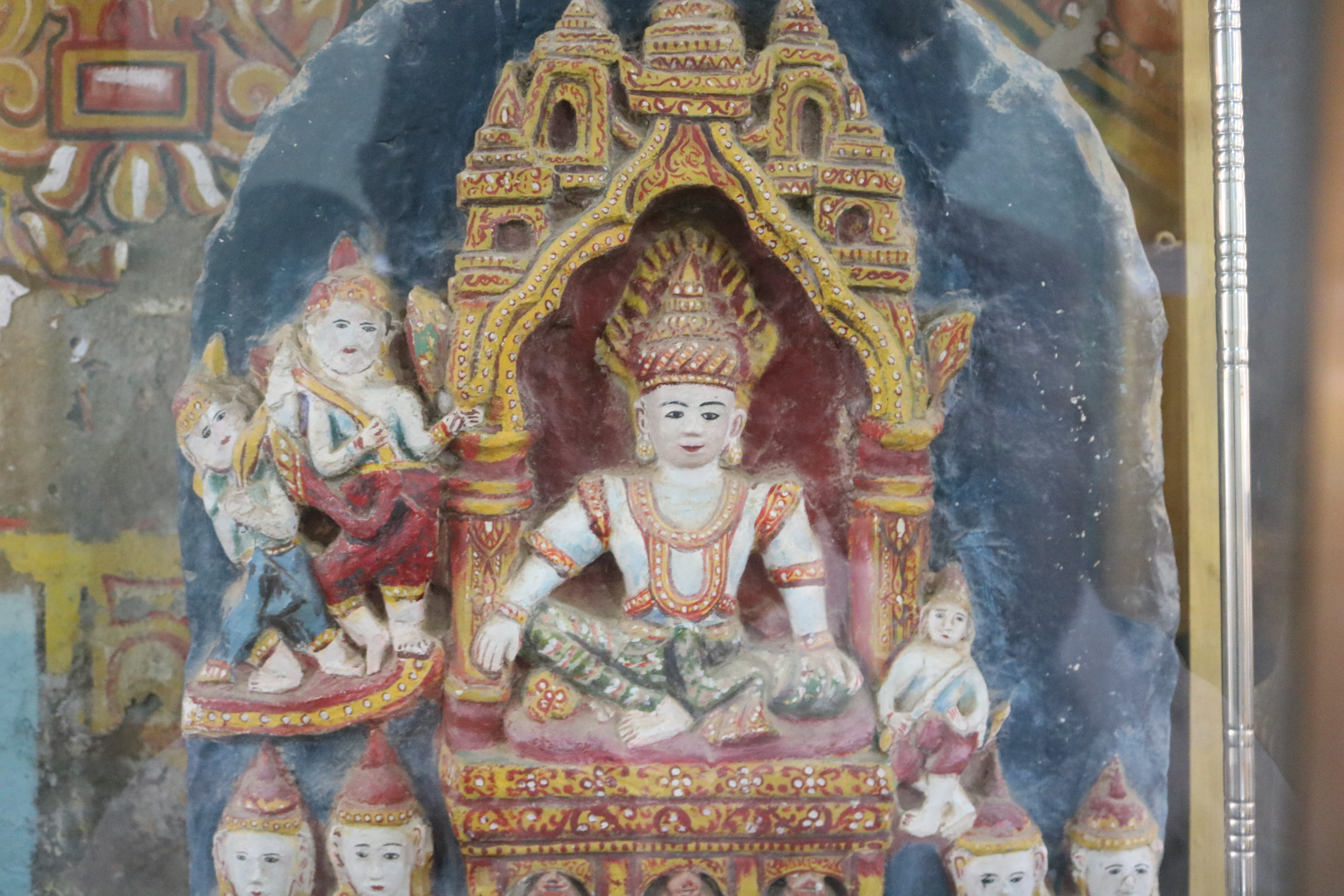
Min Razagyi, Raza II of Mrauk-U မင်းရာဇာကြီး

In 1546 CE, while the Arakanese king Min Bin was fighting a battle with the Burmese, the Sak king attacked Northern Arakan Roma and occupied the Arakanese-controlled Chacomas of the Northern Arakan Mountains. After his initial military successes against Bengal and Tripura (1532–34), Min Bin began to regard himself "as a world conqueror or cakravartin", and in commemoration of his victory in Bengal he built the Shitthaung Temple, one of the premier Buddhist Pagodas of Mrauk-U. His expansionist drive was to run into serious obstacles however. His control of Bengal beyond Chittagong was largely nominal and he, like the sultans of Bengal before him, never solved Tripuri raids into Bengal. Min Bin also led to the Toungoo–Mrauk-U War (1545–1547) which resulted in Mrauk U successfully defending its territory and maintaining independence, deterring further Toungoo invasions for decades. He survived the invasions and later provided military aid to Ava, hoping to stop Toungoo's advance into Upper Burma.

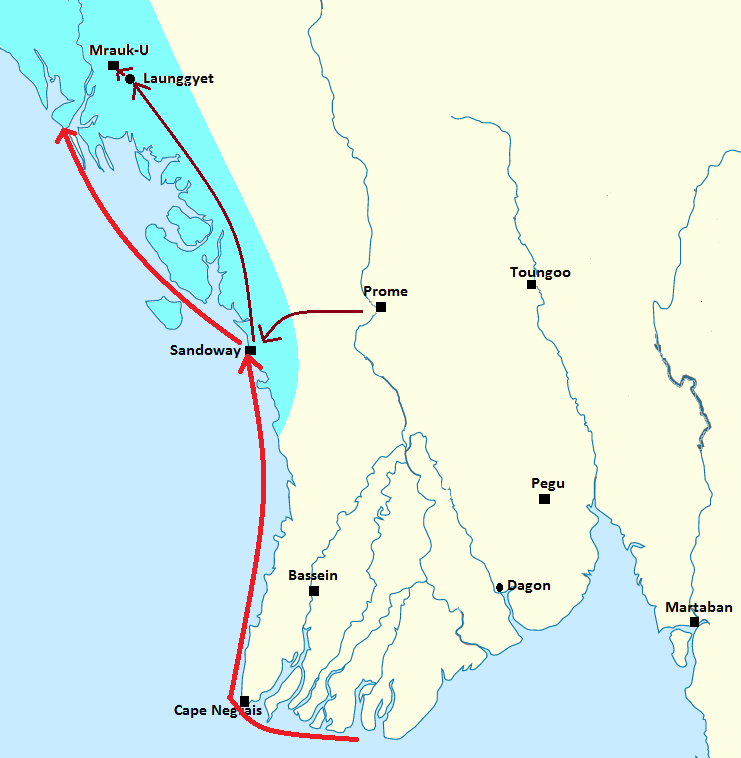
Toungoo–Mrauk-U War

=== Colonial Period (World War II) ===
After the Bamar's Konbaung Dynasty's annexation of Arakan in 1785, the Mrauk U Kingdom came to an end and an estimated 35,000 people from Arakan sought refuge in the Chittagong region of British Raj and parts of northeastern India by 1799. They fled to find protection under the British Raj. Many Rakhine Buddhists also escaped by sea to the Barisal region, where their descendants still live today.

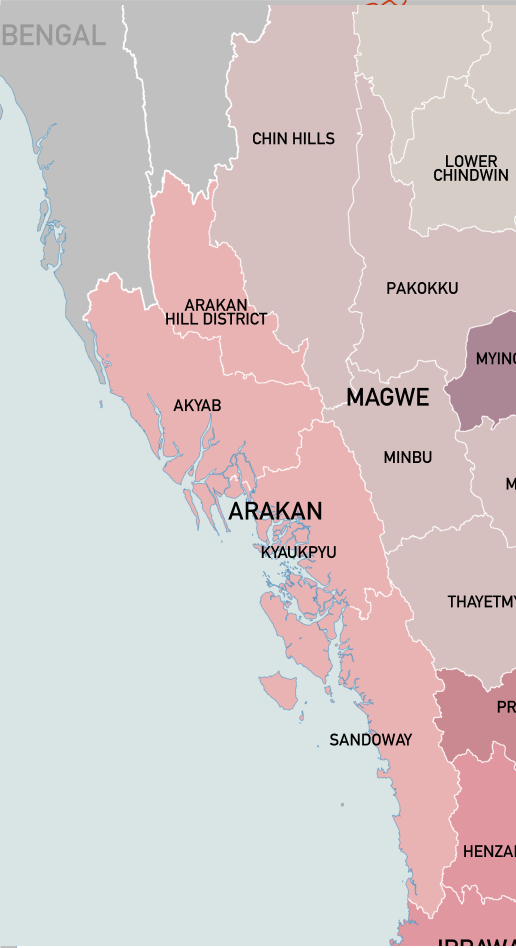
Map of Arakan Division during British Burma

In the First Anglo-Burmese War, Rakhine fought on both sides likely hoping for better autonomy but as the British began to win, most Rakhines chose to side with the British and Arakan became a part British Burma at the end of the war. Sittwe was subsequently established as the new capital of the region. However, the Rakhines soon revolted against British rule when it became clear they had no intention of restoring the old Rakhine kingdom. Despite fighting bravely, it was suppressed by superior British Indian military technology.

Arakan was occupied by Japanese forces in 1942 during World War II as part of the Burma campaign. Several military operations, including the Arakan Campaign of 1942–1943, were conducted in the region. Arakan was granted autonomy under Japanese occupation and was provided with its own military force known as the Arakan Defence Force. The Rakhine Buddhists allied with the Japanese forces against the British. But early 1945, the Arakanese switched allegiance to the Allies and fought against the Japanese. British forces, with Allied support, recaptured Arakan in 1945. Sayadaw U Ottama, a prominent Rakhine Buddhist monk and nationalist leader, had played a significant role in the anti-colonial movement against British rule.

Wages in Arakan Division were much higher than in British India. The area was known for producing a lot of rice, and Sittwe became one of the top ports for rice exports, with ships coming from Europe and China.

=== Rakhine State (1948 – present) ===
After the British Raj's decline, Arakan was incorporated into Burma (now Myanmar). In 1989, the Burmese military junta changed the region name of Arakan to Rakhine State.

Rakhine State is one of the poorest regions in Myanmar. Off its coast lies some islands such as Ramree, Cheduba, and Myingun.

== Ancestral origins ==
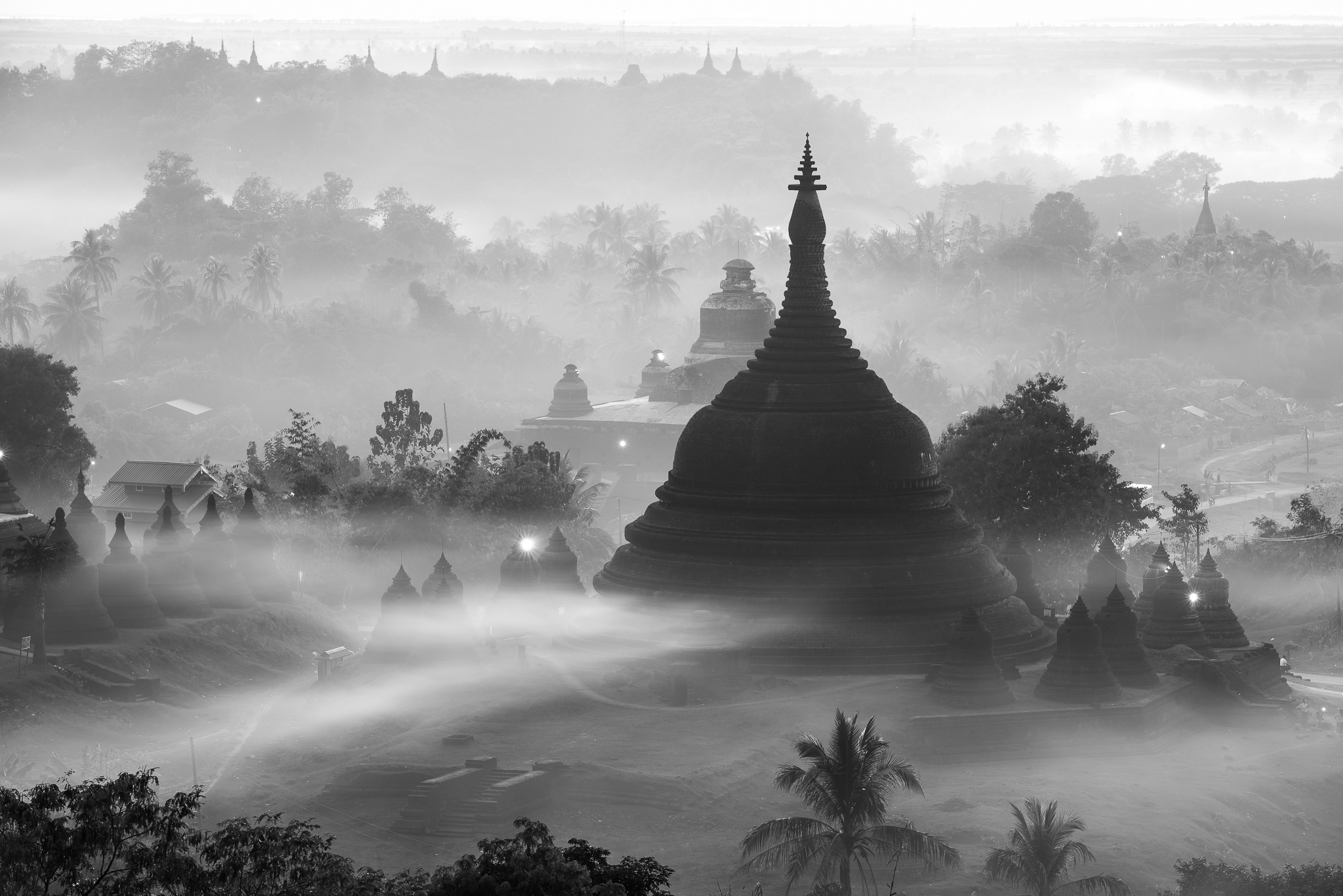
The pagodas at Mrauk-U pagodas are part of modern-day Rakhine identity.

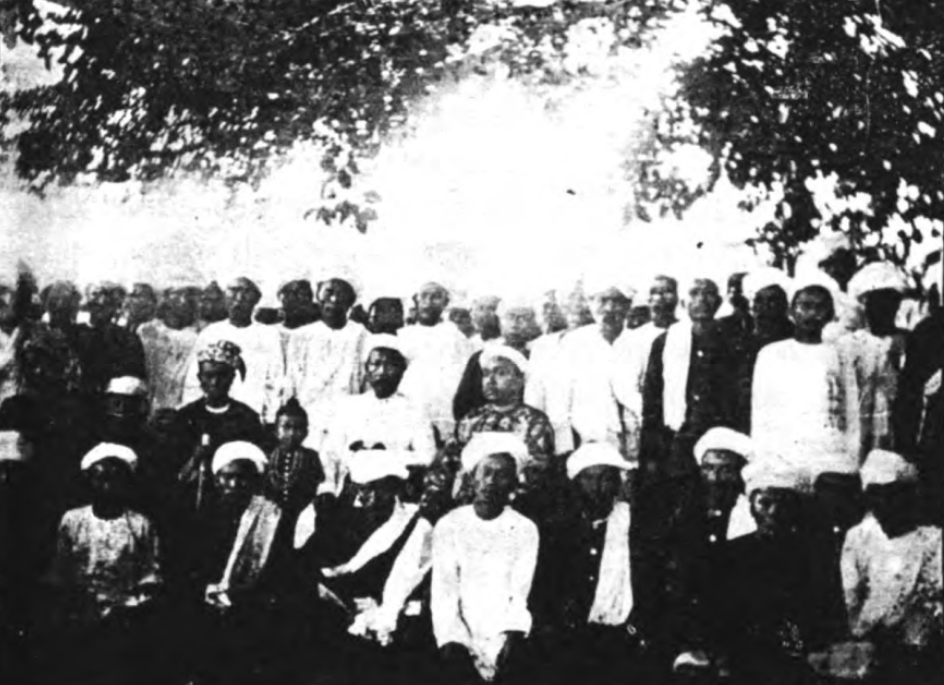
Group of Bandarban Marmas with Bohmong in centre, c. 1906

Arakanese legends and some Rakhine people claim that they are Aryans who came from Shakya in India. On the other hand, they might be mixed with Indo-Aryans and Tibeto-Burman. Kanyans of Irrawaddy Valley with later integrated into Arakanese race. Rakhine and Burmese are very closely related languages, which both descend from Old Burmese. 3000 or 2800 years ago, The Chandra dynasty that ruled Dhanyawadi and Waithali was more likely Indo-Aryan in origin. Arakanese legends claim that the Unknown ethnic are founder of Dhanyawadi. Now they are mixed with Rakhine people.

By the 9th century Rakhine people have founded Le-Mro, Le-Mro in the Rakhine language means "four cities," which refers to the four ancient Rakhine cities. In 1103, they had consolidated control of the region, becoming a tributary state of the Pagan Empire until 1167. In 1406–1429, Kingdom of Ava occupied the Northern Rakhine. Southern Rakhine was not occupied by the Bagan Empire and the Ava Kingdom. In 1429, founder of Kingdom of Mrauk U, the king Min Saw Mon reclaimed the Arakanese throne with the help of the Bengal, and ruled the kingdom. But as a vassal of Bengal 1429 to 1430. Rakhine oral traditions and written records also describe several alternative origin myths, including one that traces the Rakhine back to an intermarriage between a highland Mro and a lowland queen, and another that traces the ancestry of Rakhine monarchs back to Mahasammata, the legendary first monarch of the world.

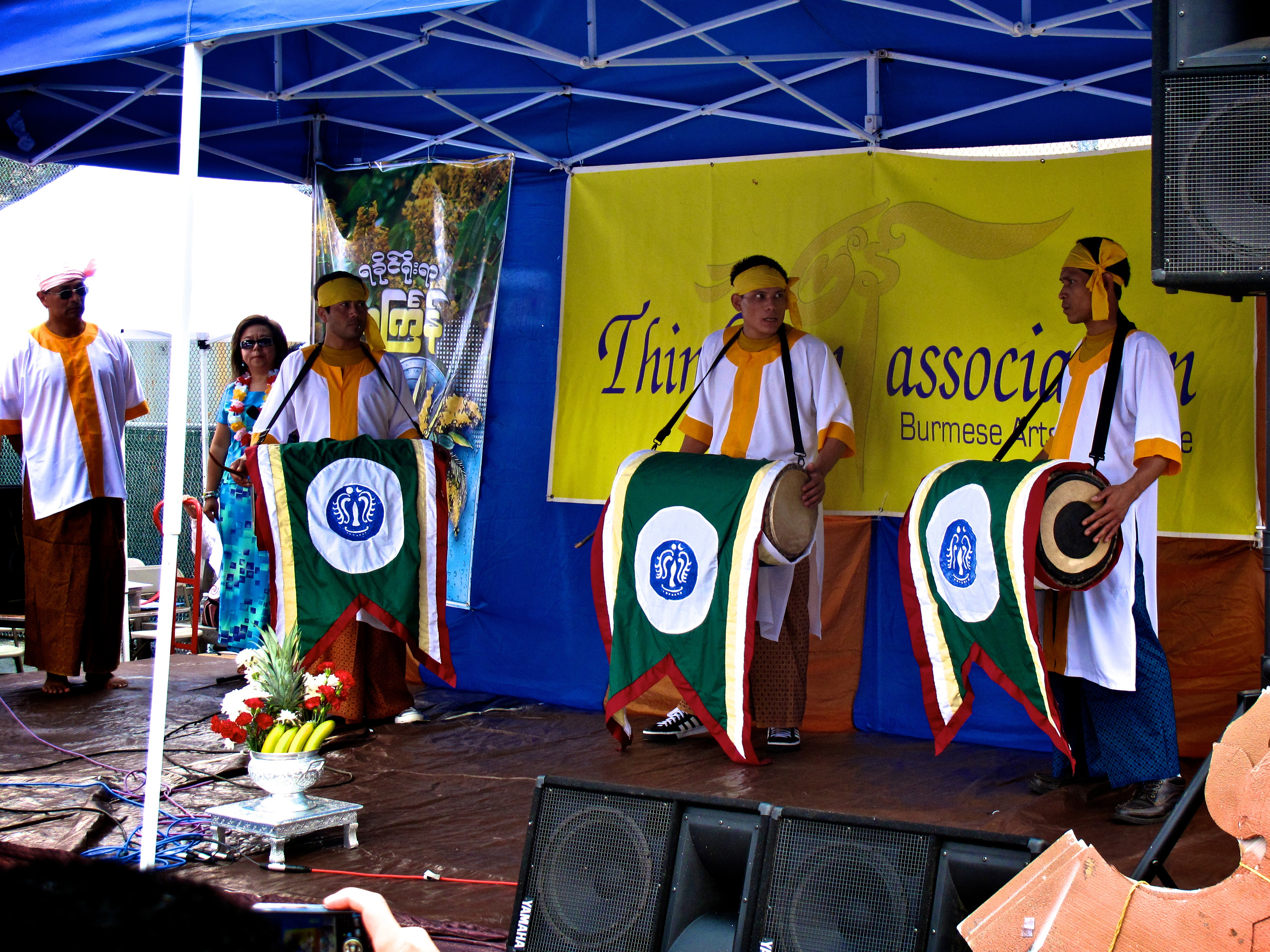
Rakhine drummers at Thingyan (Burmese New Year Festival), in New York City

After the Kingdom of Mrauk U was annexed by the Konbaung Kingdom in 1784, Rakhine refugees began settling in Cox's Bazar and Patuakhali District. The British colonial officer of the East India Trading Company, Captain Hiram Cox, was given the task of providing land to the refugees in 1799. An estimated 100,000 refugees were settled in Cox's Bazar, Chittagong Hill Tracts, and Patuakhali by the East India Company government. They settled in Patuakhali District and Barguna District in the 19th century.

=== Genetic studies ===
It can be difficult to distinguish a Rakhine person from a Bamar person, the predominant ethnic group in Myanmar, based solely on physical appearance, unless the individual is wearing traditional Rakhine clothing or speaking the Rakhine language.

Genetic analysis of the Rakhine population in Bangladesh based on 17 Y-chromosomal STR loci revealed 157 unique haplotypes with a discrimination capacity of 0.723. Phylogenetic studies show that the Rakhine are genetically closer to East Asian populations, particularly Koreans and Japanese, indicating shared ancestral links. Although some Rakhines display a notable range of physical appearances, featuring both South Asian and South East Asians. On the other hand, the Marma population, who are known to be the descendents of Rakhine people seems to share a high frequency of Indian and a low frequency of East Asian specific maternal haplogroups. Genetic studies indicate that the Rakhine population mainly shares certain similarities with East Asian groups, particularly in specific Y-chromosomal markers, though these genetic patterns do not necessarily correlate with all aspects of their physical appearance. Despite this diversity, all identify as Rakhine, a community comprising seven ethnic groups.

Their names are typically in Rakhine and Burmese language having Bamar honorifics and also using astrology-based naming system resembling Burmese names.

== Political parties and armed groups ==
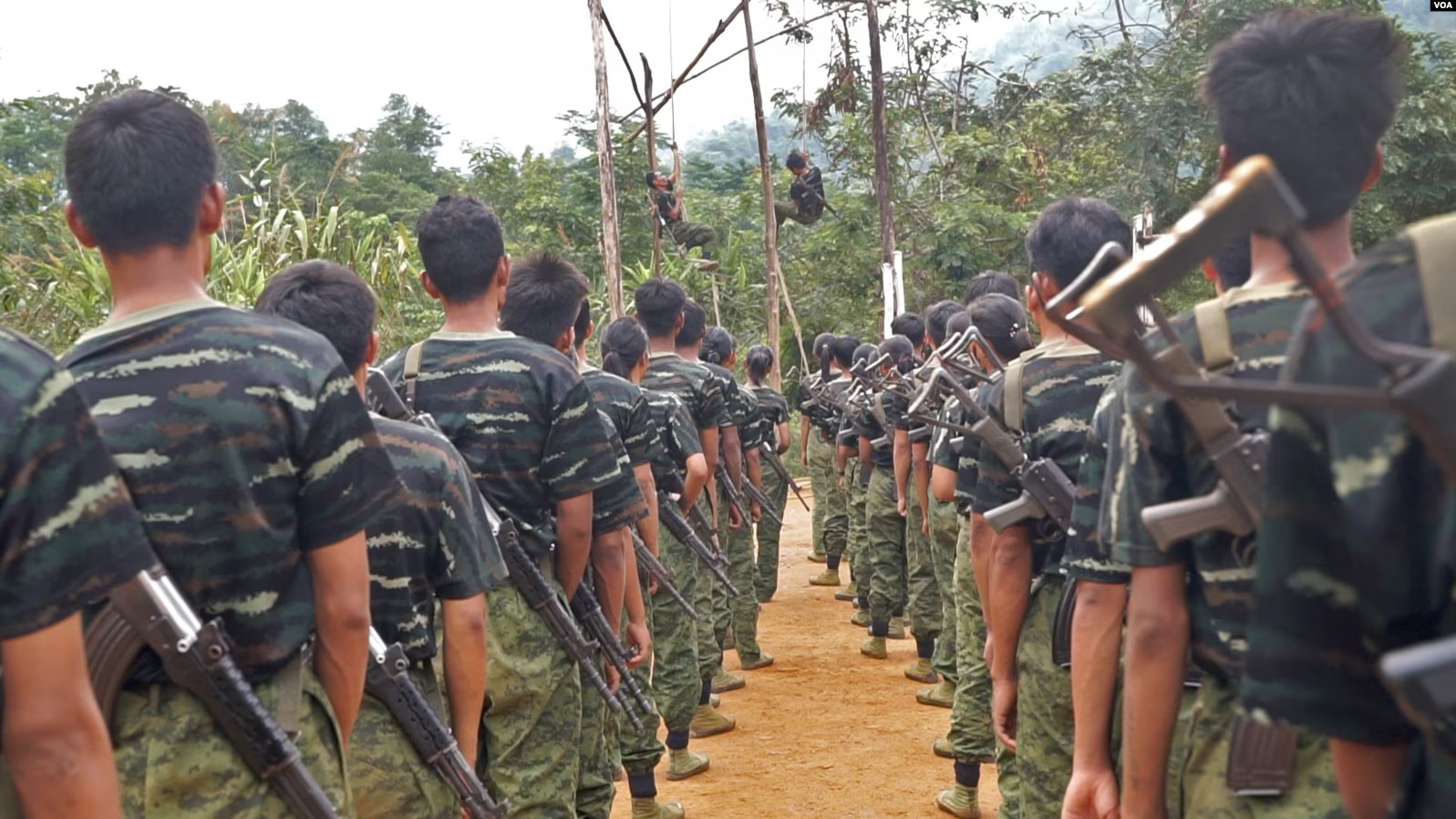
Young Rakhine Army Troops

The key political parties associated with the Rakhine people include the Arakan National Party (ANP), Arakan League for Democracy (ALD), Arakan Front Party (AFP), Arakan National Council (ANC), United League of Arakan (ULA) and the Rakhine Nationalities Development Party (RNDP). All of these parties commonly advocate for the rights and interests of the Rakhine ethnic group. Among these parties, some, like the ANP, AFP, and RNDP, are accused of anti-Rohingya, Islamophobia, and promoting hardline ethnic nationalism and ultranationalism.

There are also ethnic armed organizations associated with the Rakhine people which includes the Arakan Army (AA), Arakan Liberation Army (ALA), Arakan Independence Alliance (AIA), and the Arakan Army in Kayin State. These groups aim to secure greater autonomy and self-determination for the Rakhine people.

=== Arakan Army ===
The most notable ethnic armed organisation among the Rakhine People and rebel groups in Myanmar is the Arakan Army. Founded in April 2009, the AA is the military wing of the United League of Arakan (ULA). It is currently led by Commander-in-Chief Major General Twan Mrat Naing and vice deputy commander-in-chief Brigadier General Nyo Twan Awng. The Arakan Army states that the objective of its armed revolution is to restore the sovereignty of the Arakan people. It was declared a terrorist organization in 2020 by Myanmar, and again by the State Administration Council junta in 2024.

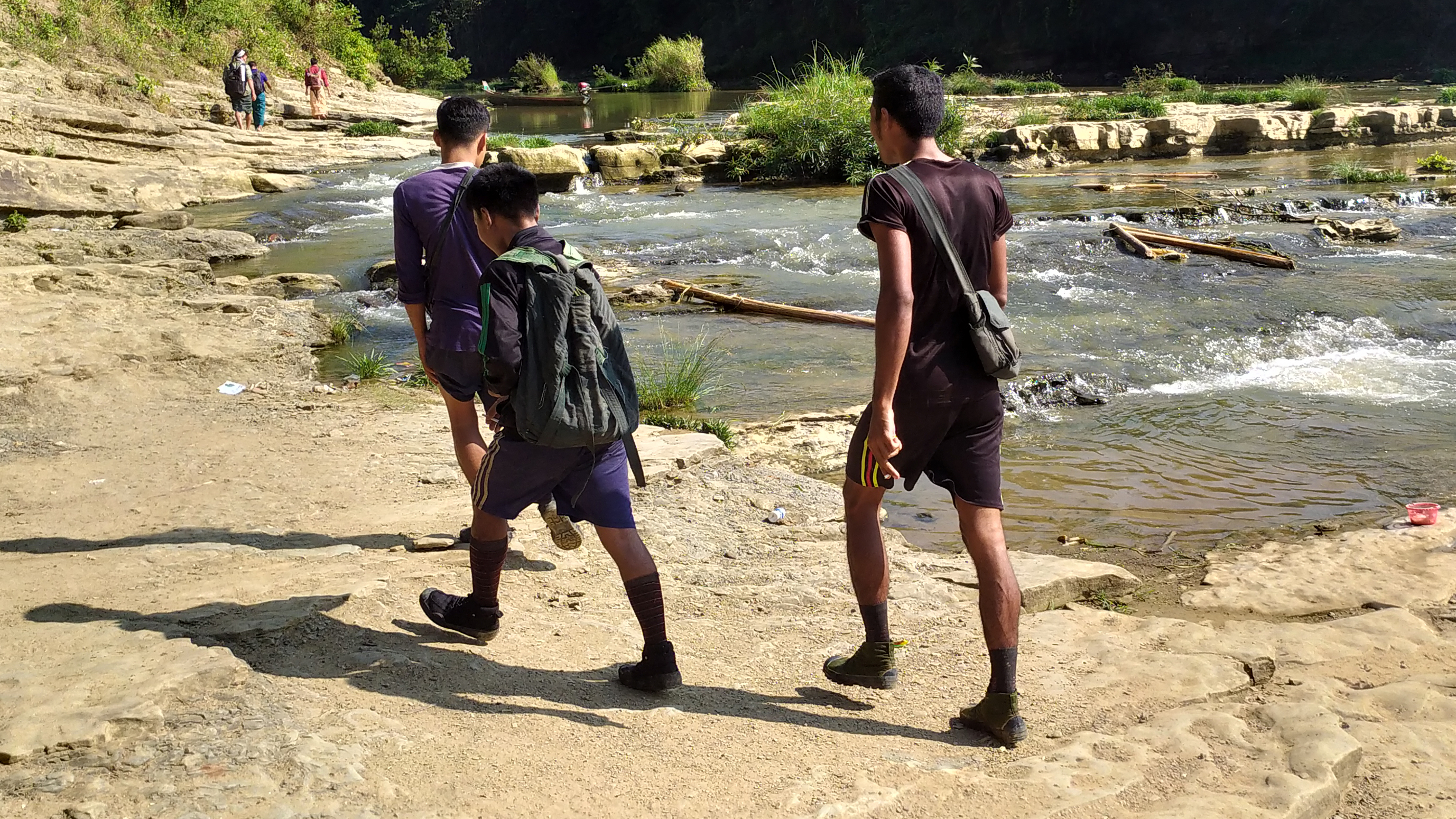
Arakan Army soldiers in 2021

The ideology of the Arakan Army is centered on the following:

- Arakanese Nationalism: A focus on promoting and preserving the identity and culture of the Arakanese people.
- Arakanese Self-Determination: Advocacy for the right of the Arakanese to govern themselves and make decisions about their own political future.
- Confederalism: Support for a confederal system that allows for greater autonomy and self-governance within a broader political framework.

Flag of the Arakan Army

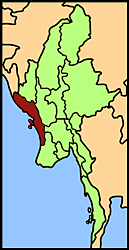
Location of Rakhine

The Rakhine Army has significantly challenged the Burmese junta's military might and has garnered considerable support among local populations.

== Rakhine in Bangladesh and India ==
Rakhine people share some historical and cultural similarities with several Northeastern Indian and Bangladesh tribes, particularly those in the Chittagong Hill Tracts, Mizoram, and Manipur. Communities like the Marma people of Rakhine have cultural parallels with the Chakma and Tripuri tribes in India.

Besides Bangladesh and India, significant Rakhine diasporas exist in Singapore, Japan, Malaysia and Thailand.

=== Bangladesh ===
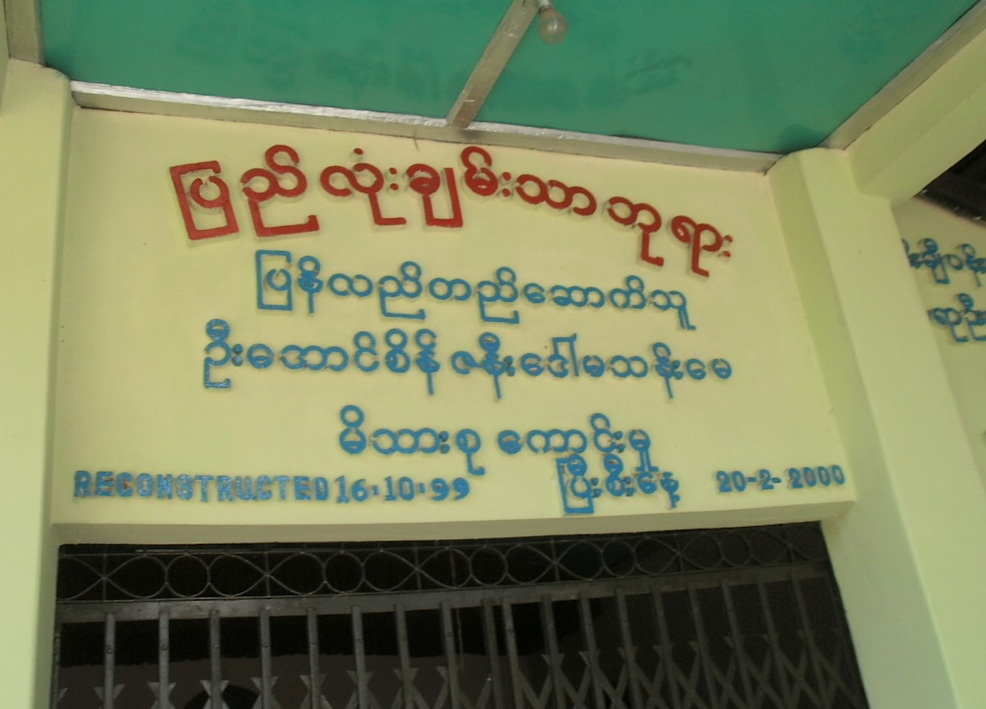
Rakhine script at a Bangladeshi Buddhist pagoda

According to the 2022 census, there are about 11,195 Rakhines living in Bangladesh. Outside of Myanmar, a sizable Rakhine community exists in the southeast districts of Bangladesh, namely in Khagrachhari, Rangamati, Bandarban and southern Cox's Bazar, with the Mong circle in Khagrachari having administrative duties. There is a small community of Rakhine people inhabiting the coastal areas of Patuakhali, Borguna and Cox's Bazar, having migrated to Bangladesh from Myanmar before the formation of these two contemporary countries. The total population of the community as of 2020 is 16,000. The Rakhine people and the local Bengali population developed a unique dialect through which they could communicate. The Rakhine people were able to preserve their culture, language, and religion in Bengal. Rakhines observe Rakhine festival such as Sanggreng and Nai-chai ka. The last Rakhine language school in Kuakata closed in 1998 due to shortage of funds, In January 2006, Chin Than Monjur, opened a Rakhine language community school which expanded into three news schools and used Rakhine language books from Myanmar. The schools were forced to close due to shortage of funds.

=== India ===
A small population of Rakhine people or their descendents referred as the Barua, Magh, or Marma people exists in India, primarily in the state of West Bengal and Northeastern parts. Around 35,722 Marma people resides in the Tripura state of India. These communities are believed to have migrated from Myanmar's Rakhine State and are predominantly Theravada Buddhists. The Barua and Magh communities in India are officially recognized as Scheduled Tribes (ST), and they have integrated into local society while preserving aspects of their distinct identity. Rakhine descendants spread as far north as Tripura state in India, where they are known as the Mog.

In November 2017, over 1,500 Rakhine Buddhists crossed into Mizoram due to clashes between the Arakan Army and Myanmar's military. While Mizoram has been supportive of refugees with shared ethnic ties, the influx of Rakhine Buddhists presented a different scenario between Mizo-Rakhine relations.

=== Persecution ===
The 150-year old Khaddya Song Chansai Rakhine cemetery in Taltali Upazila, Barguna District of Bangladesh was forcefully taken by local land grabbers in 2017. The Rakhine population in the Barguna and Patuakhali Districts decreased by 95%, from 50,000 in the 20th century to 2,561 in 2014, with Rakhines leaving Bangladesh due to illegal land-grabbing, forced encroachment and persecution. Lands owned by them in the districts decreased by 81%. Rakhine land is also being taken over by politicians in Patuakhali District.

== Culture ==
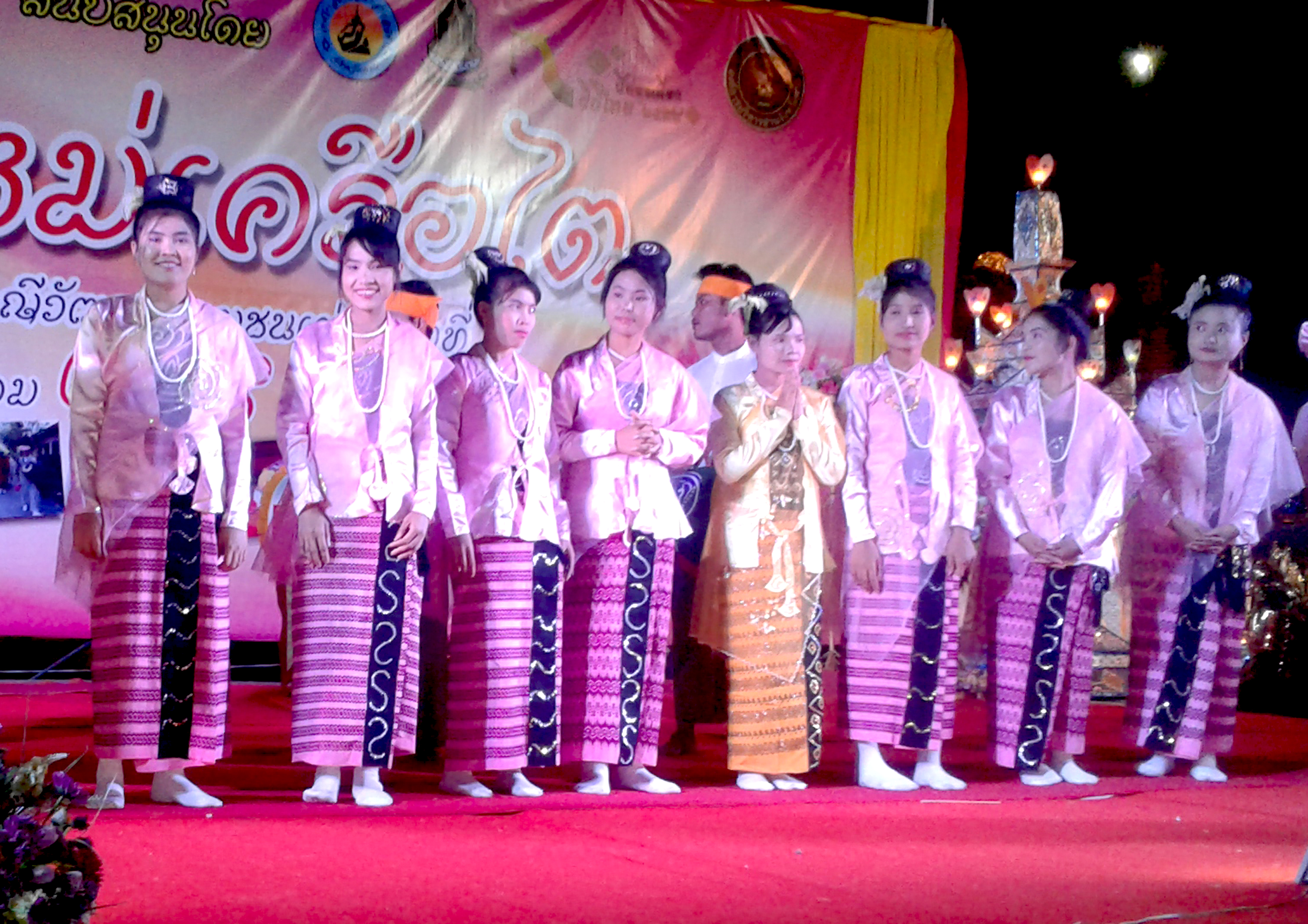
Rakhine women in their traditional attire

The Rakhine are one of the four main Buddhist ethnic groups of Burma (the others being the Burman, Shan and Mon people). Rakhine culture is similar to the mainstream Burmese culture but with more Indian influence, likely due to its geographical isolation from the Burmese mainland divided by the Arakan Mountains and its closer proximity to India. Traces of Indian influence remain in many aspects of Arakanese culture, including its literature, music, and cuisine. The traditional Rakhine kyin wrestling is a cherished game in their culture. Rakhine mont di, consisting of rice vermicelli noodles, is popular dish across Myanmar.

=== Religion ===
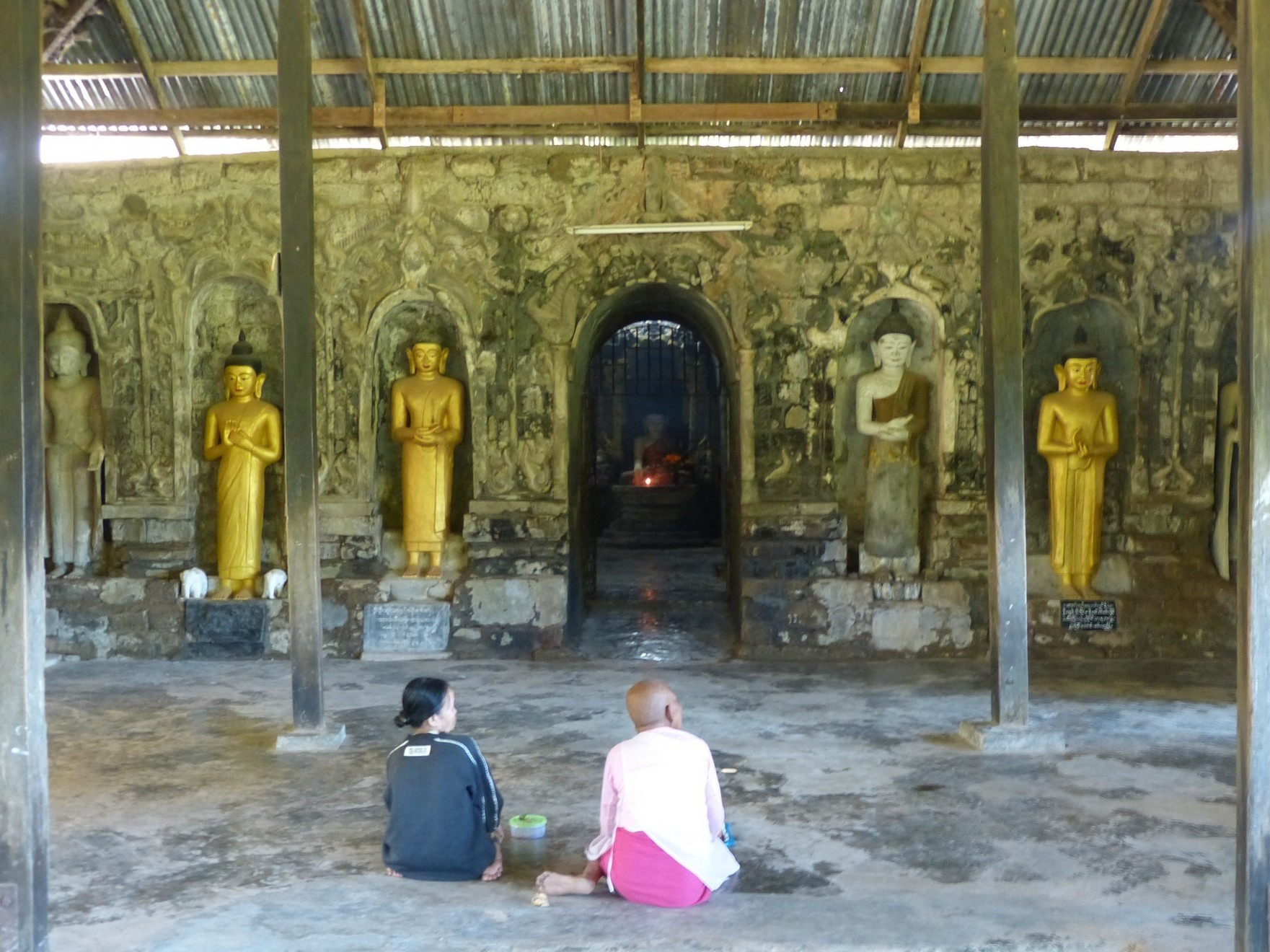
Buddhism in Rakhine State

Almost all Rakhine people are followers of Theravada Buddhism. Rakhine State is home to many Buddhist temples.

Rakhine residing in Bangladesh, mainly in the Cox's bazar and Barishal area also follows Buddhism. The ancient Rakhines were traditionally sun and moon worshippers, but with the emergence of Buddhism, they gradually embraced the faith. It is believed that the Rakhine king Sanda Thuriya adopted Buddhism between 580 and 520 BCE.

=== Literature ===
The history of the Arakanese can be traced through the Arakanese chronicles, which include works such as Maha Razawin, Rakhine Razawin, Rakhine Razawin Haung, Dhanyawaddy Ayedawbon, Rakhine Razawin Thit and others. These texts remain untranslated to English still.

=== Festivals ===
==== Sangrai festival ====
Sangrai is one of the main traditional ceremonies of the Marmas and Rakhines in which they celebrate the New Year with their own rules. In the case of the Marmas, it is celebrated according to their Burmese calendar.

The main attraction of Sangrai is the water sport called Marmara "Ri Long Poye". This water sports festival is held on the last day of Sangrai festival. Sangrai water sports are performed not only by the Marmas, but also by the Dai tribes of Southeast Asia, Myanmar, Thailand, Laos, Cambodia and China in mid-April. In Myanmar, such events are called "Thingyan" and in Thailand and Laos this ceremony is called "Sankran". "Sankran" in Thai means change. Sangrai actually means saying goodbye to the old year and welcoming the new year. At the same time, the new Jhum farming season in the Chittagong Hill Tracts begins after Sangrai. Not only Jhum farming, the Marmaras do not get married again after the Maghi full moon until Sangrai, which means that the Marmaras in Sangrai mean to start anew by throwing away all the old things, including the beginning of the new year. And so the Marmaras celebrate the New Year with a joyous ceremony in the hope of blessings and good wishes.

==== Buddha Purnima ====
The Rakhine People also observe the Buddha Purnima (Vesak). It is also known as the Buddha's Birthday worldwide. This is the anniversary of three important events in Buddha's life—his birth, his attainment of enlightenment, and his death. It is observed on the full moon day of the month of Vaisakha (usually in May).

==== Pavarana Purnima ====
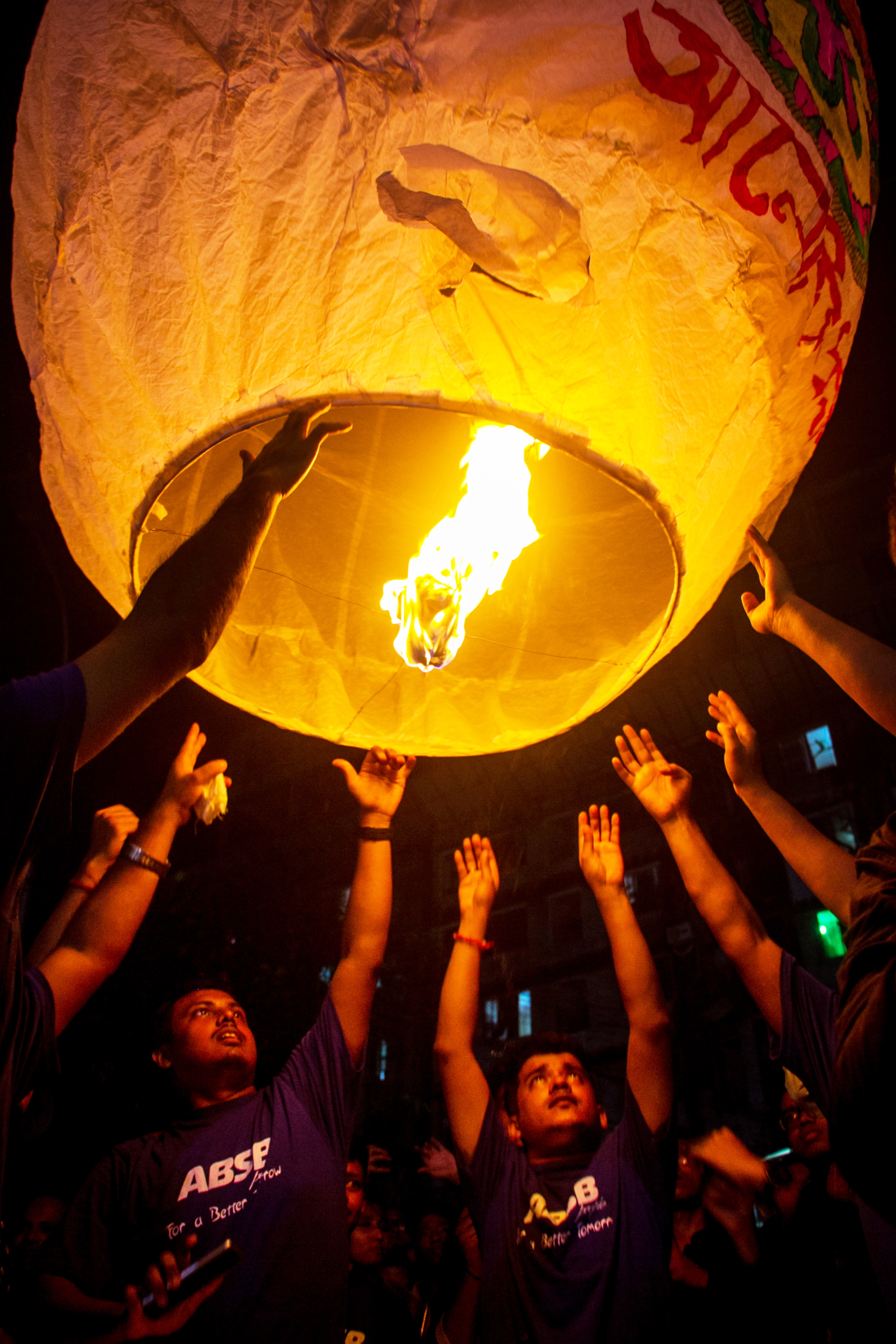
Buddhist devotees flying lanterns during pavarana purnima in Bangladesh

Pavarana is a Buddhist holy day which is also celebrated by the Rakhine people on Aashvin full moon of the lunar month. This usually occurs on the full moon of the 11th month. It marks the end of the three lunar months of Vassa, sometimes called "Buddhist Lent." The day is marked in some Asian countries where Theravada Buddhism is practiced. On this day at night, lanterns are blown into the sky to honor the heritage of Gautam Buddha.

=== Flag ===
Flag of Rakhine

The Rakhine flag features two colors, white and red, with the Shrivatsa symbol placed at the center on a blue circular background.

The Shrivatsa symbol at the centre is the symbol of Rakhine State and its people.

=== Foods ===
Rakhine cuisine is known for its bold, flavorful dishes that often feature seafood, reflecting the coastal nature of the Rakhine State. Traditional dishes like Mont di, a spicy rice noodle soup with fish broth, and Rakhine Monti, a pungent noodle soup, are staples that highlight the region's love for bold, savory tastes. The cuisine also features a variety of seafood, including prawns, crab, and fish, often prepared in flavorful curries or grilled to perfection. Another notable dish is Rakhine Moat Te Thoat, a refreshing salad made with rice vermicelli, fish cake, and fried beans. Rakhine food is distinguished by its emphasis on spiciness, sourness, and the use of locally sourced ingredients.

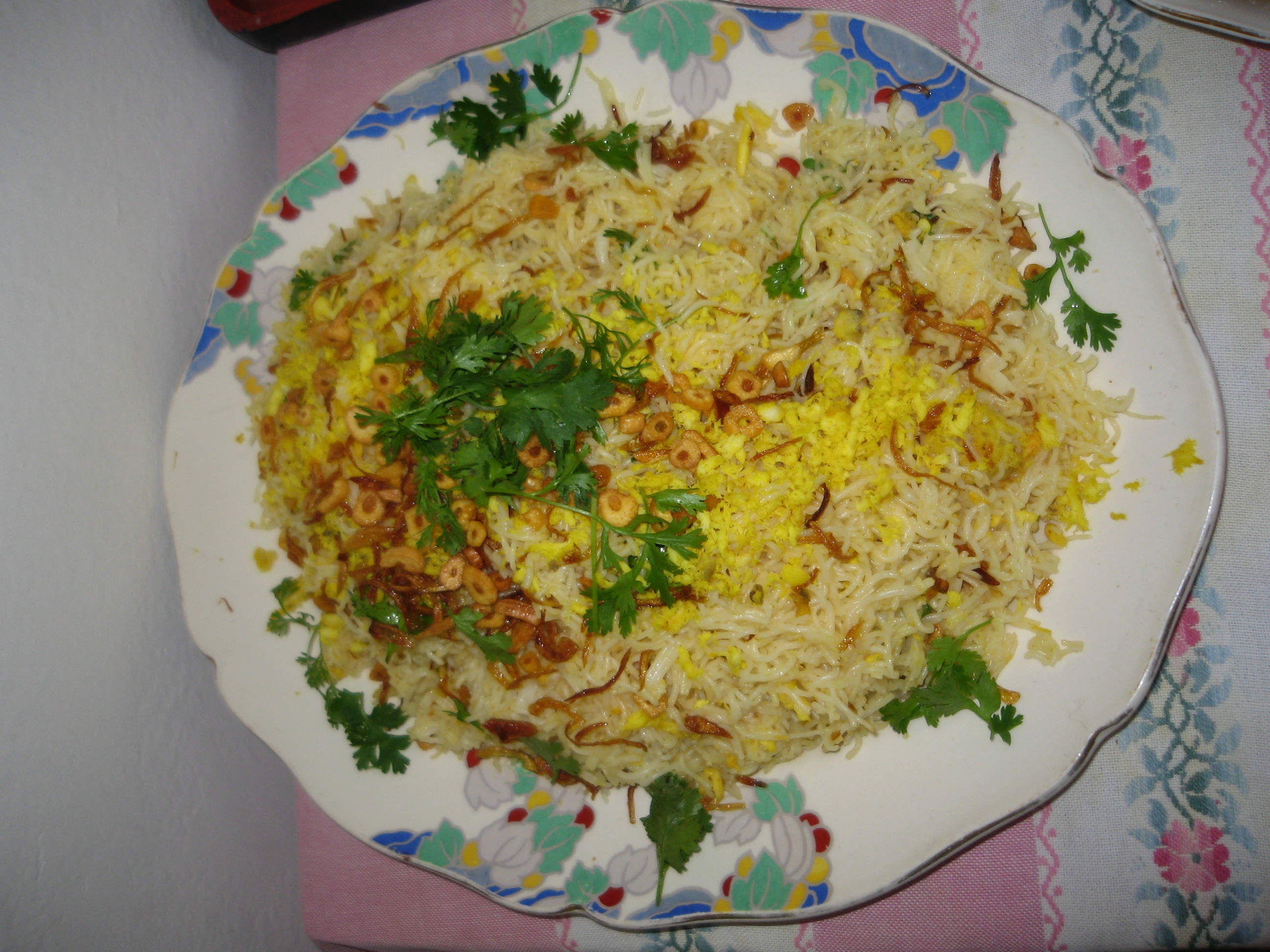
Rakhine Mont Di

=== Calendar ===
The Rakhine calendar is a traditional variant of the Burmese lunisolar calendar. It was launched by King Thuriya Thehta of the Dhanyawadi Kingdom. The Arakanese calendar mainly uses the older Makaranta system. In this system, intercalary months are regulated by the Metonic cycle of 19 years, as propounded by the Hindu astronomer Raja-Mathan. Notably, in great leap years, the Arakanese calendar adds an extra intercalary day to the month of Tagu, unlike the Burmese calendar, which adds it to Nayon. It is also used by the Chakma and Marma ethnic of Bangladesh.

=== Sports ===
Rakhine traditional sports are deeply rooted in the region's cultural heritage, with wrestling and boat racing being particularly prominent. Among the prominent sports is Kyin Wrestling, known locally as "Kyin," is a traditional form of wrestling which is significant cultural practice among the Rakhine people. Competitions are often held during major events, such as Rakhine State Day, and feature participants engaging in a display of warming-up dances called "kyin kwin" before the matches commence. The rules are straightforward: no punching, no touching the face, and no attacks below the belt. The winner is determined by throwing the opponent to the ground a set number of times.

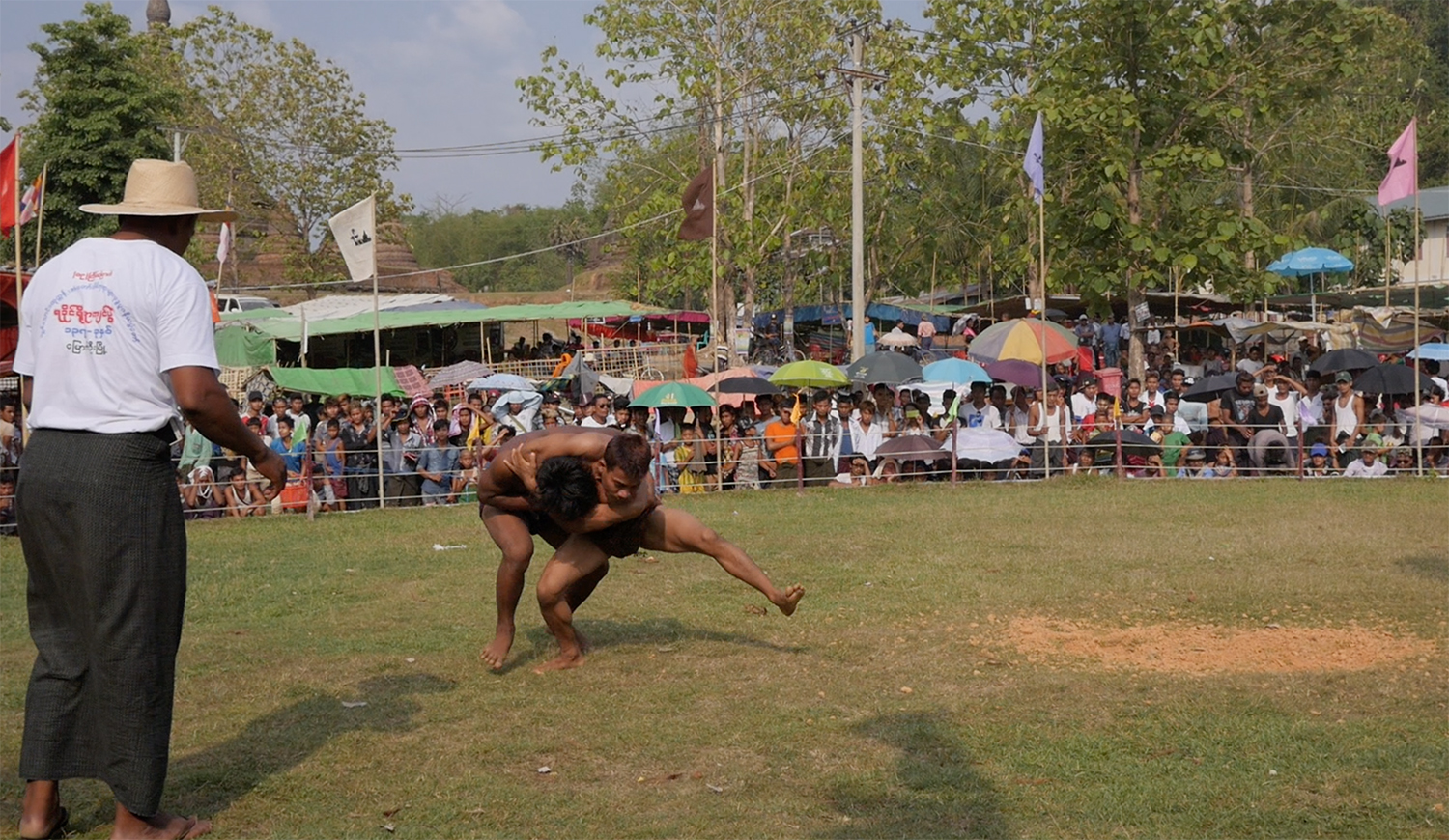
Rakhine Kyin Wrestling during Thingyan Festival in Mrauk-U

Another popular traditional sport is boat racing. Boat races are a cherished tradition in Rakhine, typically held during the monsoon season when the tides are favorable. The practice dates back to the reign of former Rakhine kings and continues to be celebrated annually.

During the Burmese month of Tabodwe, the Rakhines hold tug-of-war ceremonies called yatha hswe pwe (ရထားဆွဲပွဲ).

=== Clothing ===
The traditional attire of Rakhine are very much likely similar to Burmese people with a very minor difference. Men wear woven longyis, collarless shirts, traditional jackets called taikpon and Gaungbaung. Women wear Blouses with decorated designs, a long black piece of fabric (belt/ခါးပတ်) that is tied around the waist, another long piece that is folded and pinned on the belt, a jacket called Htaingmathein on the outside, a shawl called pawa (ပဝါ) that is put on the left shoulder and pinned on the right hip with a pin , and as well as Htamein (Burmese Sarong) but in a different pattern such as of Rakhine Style Acheik. Women style their hair specifically for Rakhine Traditional Dress, they wear their hair into a high up bun with hair pieces that are looped on the right and left on the bun, they usually also have gems and rhinestones adornments on the front face of the bun. On the back, a flower called Thazin is pinned on the women’s right side and secured with hair pins.

Picture of a Rakhine Hlaingmathein, belt (left), and decorative piece (right)

=== Wedding ===
The Rakhines celebrate their wedding ceremony which is referred as thamet tet pwe (meaning "ceremony of the son-in-law's ascent"). During the event, the groom wears a taungshay paso and gaung baung, while the bride is dressed in an outfit featuring a htaingmathein jacket adorned with celestial beings, birds and a lion. A wedding table is prepared with paddy seeds and silver coins sprinkled across it, symbolizing prosperity and fertility. The couple then wears ceremonial wedding headdresses (ဦးသျှောင်). A sacred thread is wrapped around the wedding table multiple times. The couple offers morsels of food to their parents before removing their headdresses. The groom places his headdress on the bride's head, formalizing the wedding.

=== Dance ===
The oil lamp dance (ဆီမီးကွက်အက) is a notable Rakhine dance performance in which a lighted wick of cotton, soaked in oil and placed in an earthenware saucer, serves as the centerpiece. The dance is known to have originated during the Dhanyawadi Dynasty. The oil lamp dance is incorporated into many of their cultural performances, primarily as an expression of devotion to the Buddha. Initially presented as a sacred offering to the Buddha, the traditional oil lamp is sometimes also frequently replaced with a candle. The Shin Daing dance is also another significant cultural dance of the Rakhine heritage.

== Language ==
The Rakhine language is a Tibeto-Burman language spoken in western Myanmar, primarily in the Rakhine State. Closely related to Burmese, the language is spoken by the Rakhine and Marma peoples; it is estimated to have around one million native speakers and it is spoken as a second language by a further million.

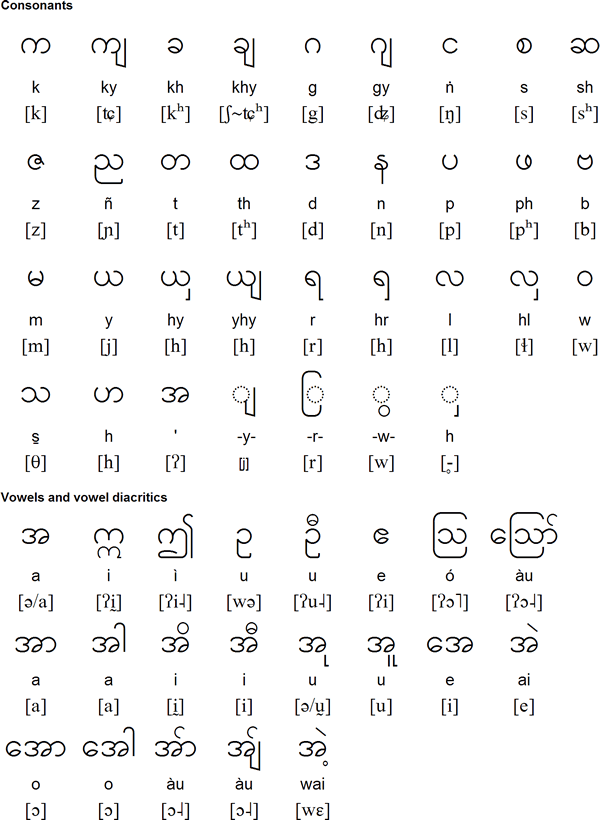
Arakanese or the Rakhine language alphabets

It is closely related to and generally mutually intelligible with Burmese. Notably, Rakhine retains an /r/ sound that has become /j/ in Burmese. Rakhine utilises the Burmese alphabet.

Rakhine State is home to Sanskrit inscriptions that date from the first millennium to the 1000s. These inscriptions were written in Northern Brahmic scripts. However, these inscriptions are not ancestral to Arakanese epigraphy, which mainly uses the Mon–Burmese script. While some Arakanese have coined the term "Rakkhawunna" (Rakkhavaṇṇa) to describe a script that predates the usage of written Burmese, there is no contemporary lithic evidence to support the existence of such a script.

== Notable Rakhine ==
- Aung Zan Wai, politician
- Nay Toe, actor
- Pe Myint, government minister
- U Ottama, colonial activist and monk
- Twan Mrat Naing, Arakanese revolutionary and commander in chief of the Arakan Army
- Nyo Twan Awng, Vice commander in chief of the Arakan Army
- Aung Lwin, Arakanese actor and director
- Kyaw Zaw Oo, Arakanese politician
- Daw Kyan, historian and writer
- Kaiser, musician
- Zun Than Sin, model, musician, and beauty pageant titleholder
- Yadanar Phyu Phyu Aung, actress and singer
- Nay Htet Lin, actor
- Shine, musician
- Min Thway, actor & singer
- Aye Tha Aung, politician
- Aye Maung, politician and chairperson of the Arakan National Party
- Kyaw Kyaw, politician
- Min Thway, singer and actor
- Thar Nge, singer
- Kyaw Soe Oo, Myanmar Reuters journalist
- Wai Sein Aung, politician
- Maung Maung Win, footballer
- Thiha Htet Aung, footballer
- Aye Nu Sein, lawyer and politician
- Yadanar My, singer
- Honey Nway Oo, former actress and current officer in the Student Armed Force (SAF).
- Chue Lay, Actress
- Aung Rakhine, Bangladeshi Rakhine Film Director
- Rani Yan Yan, Current queen of Chakma circle
- Kyaw Kyaw Win, politician and lawyer

== See also ==
- History of Rakhine
- Arakan
- List of Arakanese monarchs

== Bibliography ==
- Aye Chan (Autumn 2005). "The Development of a Muslim Enclave in Arakan (Rakhine) State of Burma (Myanmar)" (PDF). SOAS Bulletin of Burma Research. 3 (2). Archived from the original (PDF) on 12 July 2013.
- Charney, Michael W. (1999). 'Where Jambudipa and Islamdom Converged: Religious Change and the Emergence of Buddhist Communalism in Early Modern Arakan, 15th–19th Centuries.' PhD Dissertation, University of Michigan.
- Charney, Michael (2005). Buddhism in Arakan:Theories and Historiography of the Religious Basis of Ethnonyms. Arakan History Conference. Bangkok: Chulalongkorn University. Archived from the original on 26 September 2021.
- Leider, Jacques P. (2004). 'Le Royaume d'Arakan, Birmanie. Son histoire politique entre le début du XVe et la fin du XVIIe siècle,' Paris, EFEO.
- Loeffner, L. G. (1976). "Historical Phonology of Burmese and Arakanese Finals." Ninth International Conference on Sino-Tibetan Languages and Linguistics, Copenhagen. 22–24 Oct. 1976.
