= Flag of Rakhine State =

Arakanese flag

Rakhine State
- Use: Civil and state flag
- Proportion: 2:3
- Design: A bicolour of white and red, charged with the Shrivatsa symbol on a blue disk in the centre.

The flag of Rakhine State in Myanmar is a bicolour of white and red, charged with the Shrivatsa, a historical symbol of Arakan, on a blue disk in the centre. The bicolour of the flag has been adopted by various ethnic-Rakhine organisations and political parties, often with different symbols in the centre.

== Flag variants ==
Flag commonly used by Rakhine nationalist organisations, most notably the Arakan Liberation Party/Army

Flag of the Rakhine Nationalities Development Party
