= Yadanar Phyu Phyu Aung =

Burmese actress and singer

- ရတနာဖြူဖြူအောင်
- Born: 7 August 1991 (age 35); Kyaukphyu, Rakhine State, Myanmar
- Other name: Putu
- Education: Dagon University
- Occupations: Actress, singer
- Years active: 2008–present
- Height: 1.60 m (5 ft 3 in)
- Awards: People Choice Award (runway competition held by Excellent Choice 2009); Miss Chinese Award (Mister and Miss Chinese runway competition 2009)
- Musical career
- Genre: Pop
- Instruments: Vocals; guitar; piano

Yadanar Phyu Phyu Aung (Burmese: ရတနာဖြူဖြူအောင်; born 7 August 1991) is a Burmese actress and singer of ethnic Rakhine descent. She acted as a leading actress in over 30 films and 2 big screen movies Nat Khat Mhar Tae Tite Pwal and Kaung Kin Mhar Ayoke Yay Tae Kyal. She has been nominated as the Best Supporting Actress with the film Nat Khat Mhar Tae Tite Pwal for 2015 in Myanmar Motion Picture Academy Awards 2014/2015. Her song Mhyaw Lint Yin was listed in Top 100 chart on Joox.

== Early life ==
Yadanar Phyu Phyu Aung was born on 7 August 1991 in Kyaukphyu, Rakhine State, Myanmar to ethnic Rakhine parents. She graduated with a degree, Bachelor of Arts from Dagon University.

== Career ==
=== Modelling career ===
She has been trained as a professional model in Stars & Models International in 2008. Her first-ever runway was in Myanmar International Fashion Week Runway Show after she has finished her training. Since then, she participated in many other famous runway shows and gained success as a professional runway model. She won People Choice Award in runway competition held by Excellent Choice 2009. She also won Miss Chinese Award in Mister and Miss Chinese runway competition 2009.

=== Acting career ===
She started her acting career by starring in her debut film Ma Chaw Sal Yaut Ko Ta Yaut. Then she starred in 7 other films as a supporting actress. She acted as a leading actress in over 30 films and 2 big screen Nat Khat Mhar Tae Tite Pwal and Kaung Kin Mhar Ayoke Yay Tae Kyal. Three of her films, Chocolate, She, Take Sate Taw Than Yaw Sin and Big Screen Nat Khat Mhar Tae Tite Pwal were gained popularity among audiences in Myanmar and led to increased recognition for Yadanar Phyu Phyu Aung. She has been nominated as the Best Supporting Actress with the film Nat Khat Mhar Tae Tite Pwal for 2015 in Myanmar Motion Picture Academy Awards 2014/2015.

=== Music career ===
Her music career started in 2011. The first step, she featured in duet song Kan Kaung Dal with Famous Singer, Aww Ratha in Shwe FM 2nd Anniversary album. She then featured in song Nga Bawa and she gained enormous success and recognition. She released her single songs Mat Ma Pyal, Mile Paung Kuday and Mhyaw Lint Yin.

== Filmography ==
=== Film ===
- Chocolate (ချောကလက်)
- Heart Target (နှလုံးသားပစ်မှတ်)
- Tain Ngwet Phyu (တိမ်ငွေ့ဖြူ)
- Kyite Tar Sar Oo Nauk Taw Phauk Ma Sar Nae (ကြိုက်တာစား ဦးနှောက်တော့ဖောက်မစားနဲ့)
- Silent Attachment (တိတ်ဆိတ်သောသံယောဇဉ်)
- Kar Yan Nyi Tae Eain Ka Lay (ကာရံညီတဲ့အိမ်ကလေး)
- She (သူမ)
- Shuee Shaung (ရွှီရှောင်)
- Kaung Kin Pyauk Tae Kyal (ကောင်းကင်ပျောက်တဲ့ကြယ်)
- Adin Myo Thu Myar (ဧဒင်မြို့သူများ)
- A Yake Pyee Taw Thu (အရိပ်ပြီးတော့ သူ)
- Min Nae A Thu (မင်းနဲ့အတူ)

=== Film (Cinema) ===
- Nat Khat Mhar Tae Tite Pwal (နက္ခတ်မှားတဲ့တိုက်ပွဲ) (2015)
- Kaung Kin Mhar Ayoke Yay Tae Kyal (ကောင်းကင်မှာအရုပ်ရေးတဲ့ကြယ်) (on Sky Net Cinema Pay Per View) (2019)

=== Television series ===
Year	English title	Myanmar title	Network	Notes
2018	Late Pyar Khaung Moe	လိပ်ပြာခေါင်မိုး	Media 7	mini web series

== Discography ==
=== Album ===
- Eain Met Ka Lay

=== Singles ===
- Kan Kaung Dal with Aww Ratha from Shwe FM 2nd Anniversary album
- Nga Bawa
- Mat Ma Pyal
- Mile Paung Kuday
- Mhyaw Lint Yin
- Darling (17 July 2020)
