= Phankhon =

Children's game in Myanmar

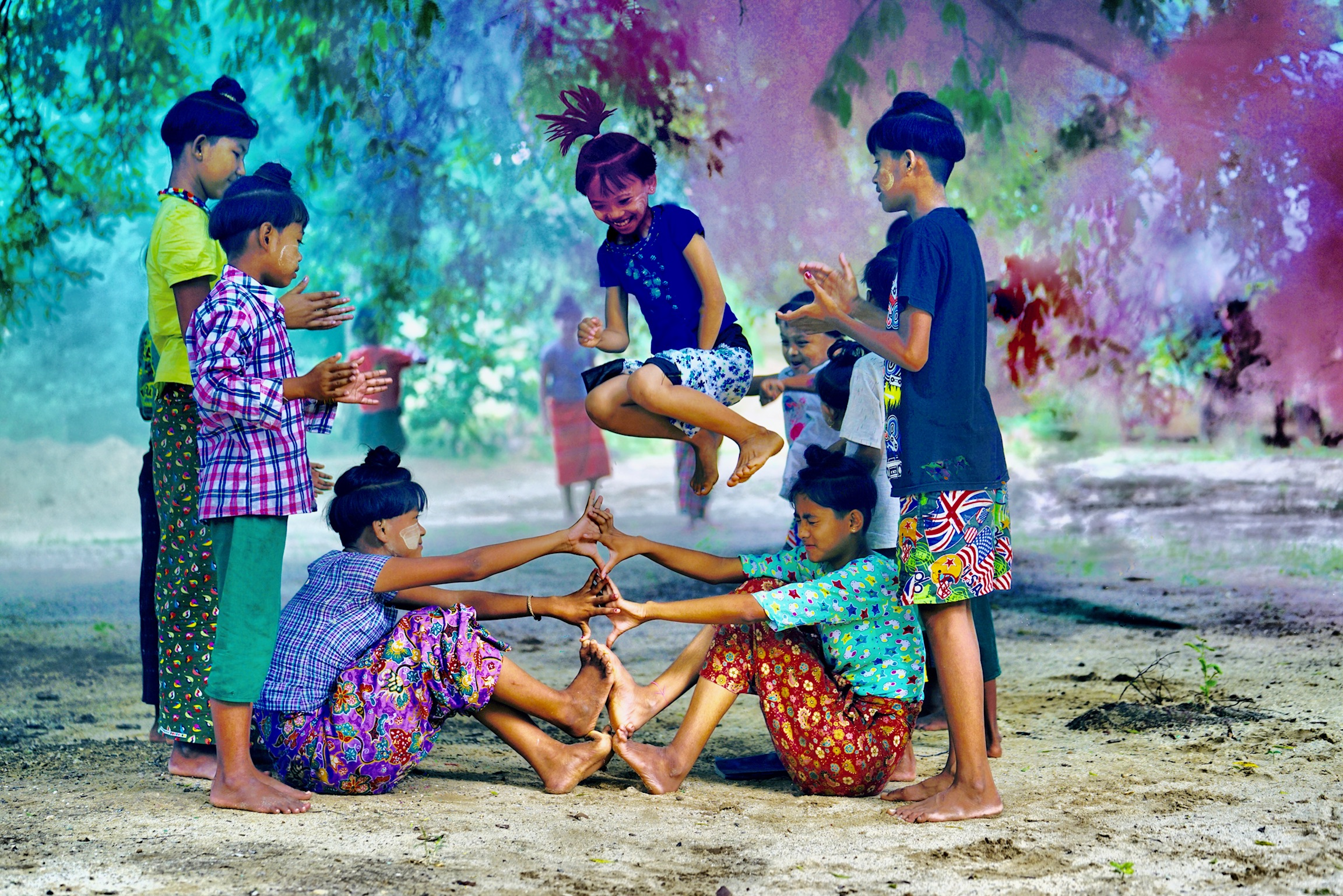
Children of Set Set Yo Village in Myanmar demonstrating the fifth and final round of phankhon, or "High Jump Game." This traditional game is played by children in Myanmar. A similar game called Luksong tinik is played by Filipino children.

Phankhon (Burmese: ဖန်ခုန်တမ်း) is a traditional children's game in Myanmar. The game is played mostly by girls, though young boys will sometimes join in. Phankhon requires two teams comprising four to five players. There is an offensive team and a defending team. The offensive team must hop on one leg over five different human obstacles created by the “defending” team. With each round, the defending team adds an obstacle to make the jumps higher.

== Rules ==
=== First round ===
In the first level, two members of the defending team sit on the ground facing each other, legs slightly spread, with the soles of their feet touching. The other team then hops one-legged, one-at-a-time, over the tangle of legs. For each team member who successfully jumps over two feet, one point is given to the team. If the player touches the obstacle, they are not allowed to continue to the next level.

=== Second round ===
Once each player has a turn, the hurdle becomes more difficult. The two players on the ground close their legs together, thus creating a wider obstacle. The rules remain the same: touch the obstacle and you are out. Jump successfully and you make it to the next level and give a point to your team.

=== Third round ===
In the third round, the obstacle is doubled in height when the seated players place one leg above the other in such a way that the toes of the bottom foot support the heel of the other. The two players remain like this with their soles still touching. The jumpers who survive move on to round four and each earns a point for their team.

=== Fourth round ===
Next, the obstacle is raised slightly when one of the players on the ground rests one of her palms on the toes of her highest foot. Her teammate sitting opposite her meets her fingers with an outstretched arm. Successful attackers score a point for their team. Those who fail are out.

=== Fifth round ===
In the last round, the players place another palm on top of the ones they already have outstretched. As with the other games, successful players score a point for their teams. When there are no attackers left, the teams switch places.

== Variants ==
=== The Philippines ===
A similar game, Luksong tinik (English: "Jump Over The Thorns of a Plant") is a popular game in the Philippines. This version originated in Cabanatuan city, Philippines and is played by two teams with equal numbers of players.

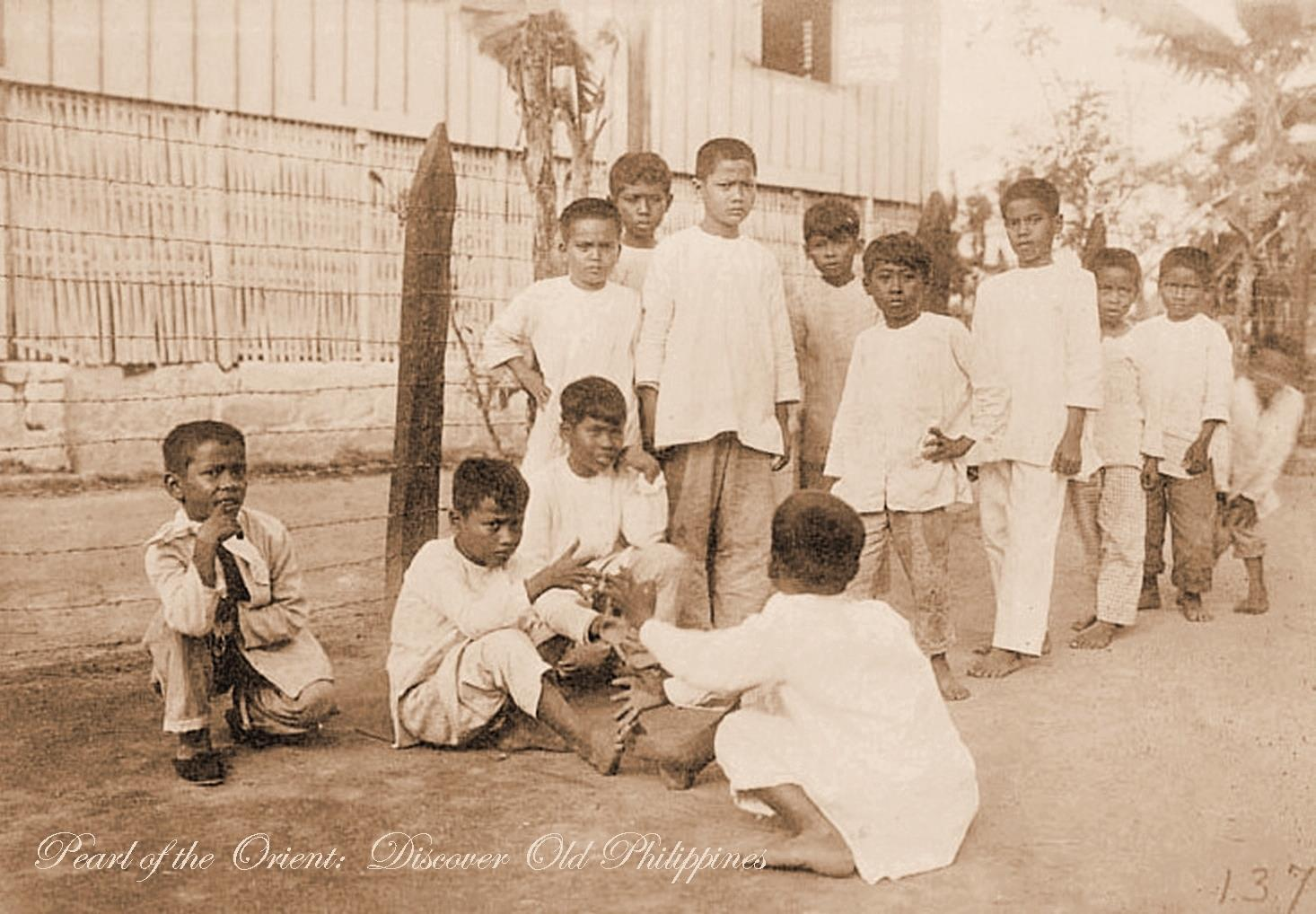
Luksong Tinik in Manila, 1910. Photographic Image from the Smithsonian Libraries [National Anthropological Archives]

Each team designates a leader, the nanay (mother), while the rest of the players are called anak (children). The players chosen to be nanay are usually the ones who can jump the highest. The game involves players sitting on the ground and other players jumping over parts of their body. The nanay and anak jump over the other team's feet, which represent the tinik, or thorn. The two players on the ground who comprise the tinik add a foot (soles touching) or hand to the height of the tinik after all players have jumped the 1st round. The players set a starting point, wherein enough runway is given to ensure a high-enough jump to not hit the hands or feet of the players who make up the tinik. If a player accidentally hits the hands or feet of the tinik, they will be removed from that round or must replace the players on the ground as the new tinik.
