= Htaingmathein =

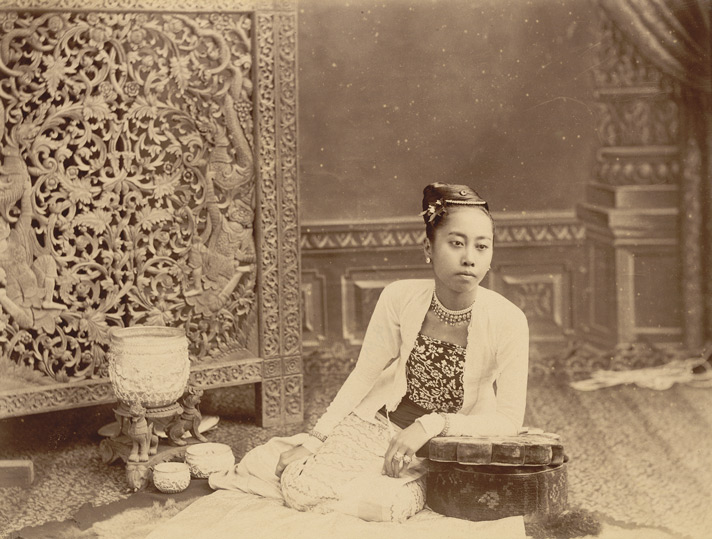
- In this colonial-era photo, a Burmese woman is dressed in a yinkhan (bodice), and htaingmathein (jacket).
- Type: Jacket
- Material: Various (inc. satin, lace, silk, cotton)
- Place of origin: Myanmar (Burma)

Htaingmathein (Burmese: ထိုင်မသိမ်း; Burmese pronunciation: [tʰàɪɴməθéɪɴ]) is the name of a traditional Burmese buttonless hip-length jacket, sometimes with flared bottoms and embroidered sequins. Htaingmathein in Burmese literally means "does not gather while sitting," referring to the fact that the tight-fitting jacket does not crumple up when sitting. This jacket was popular among the aristocratic classes during the Konbaung dynasty, and is now most commonly worn by females as part of a wedding dress, or as traditional dance costume. The htaingmathein is worn over a bodice called yinkhan (ရင်ခံ, [jɪ̀ɴkʰàɴ]). Historically, the htaingmathein also had a pair of pendulous appendages on both sides called kalano (ကုလားနို့).

== Gallery ==
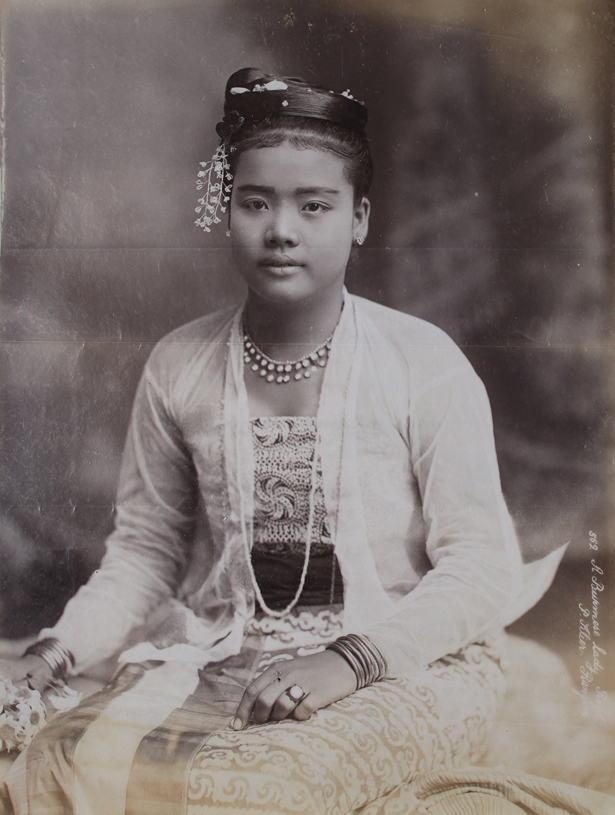

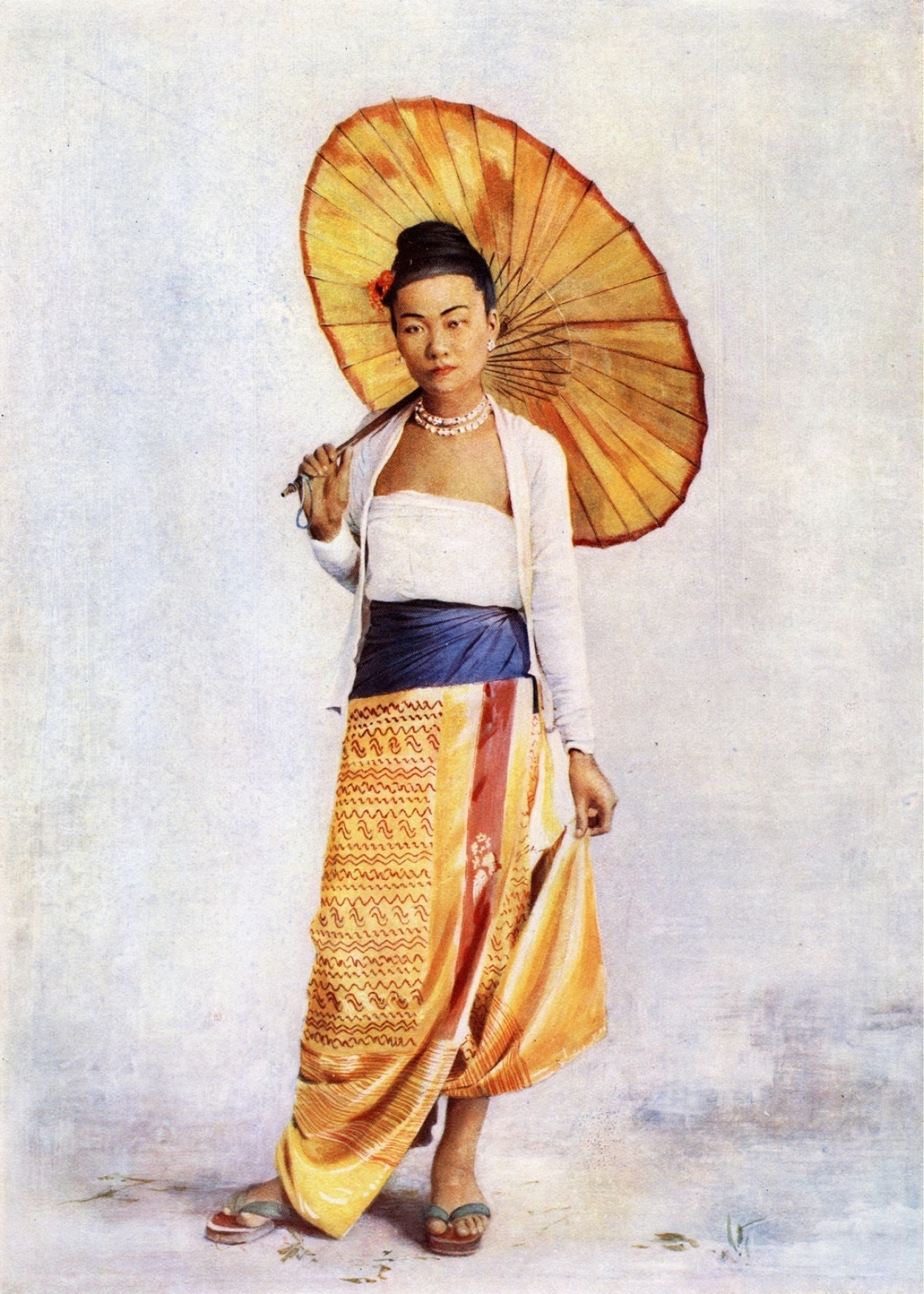

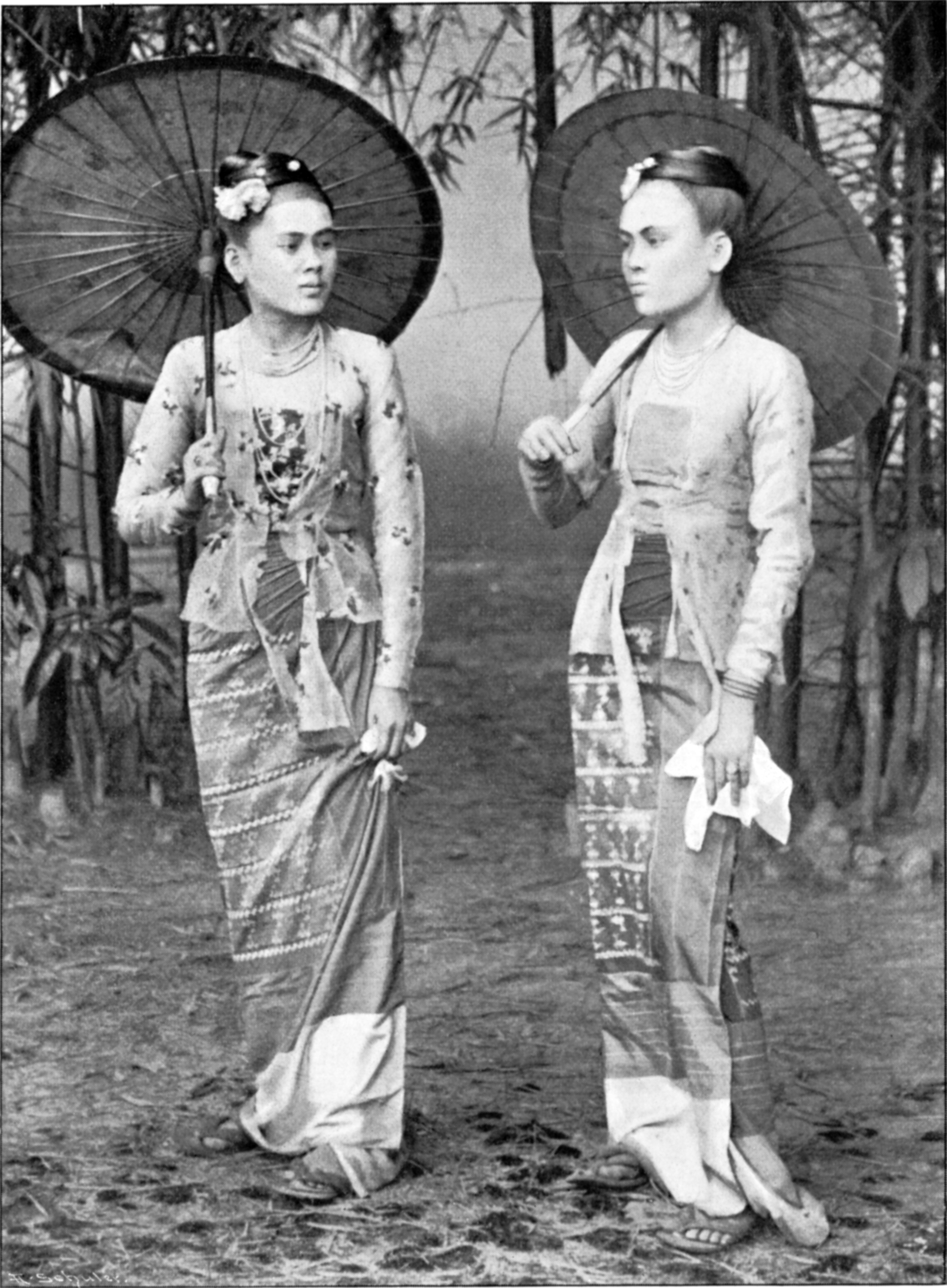

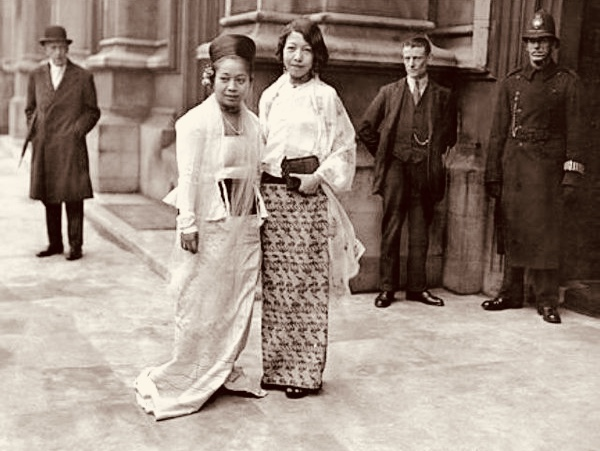

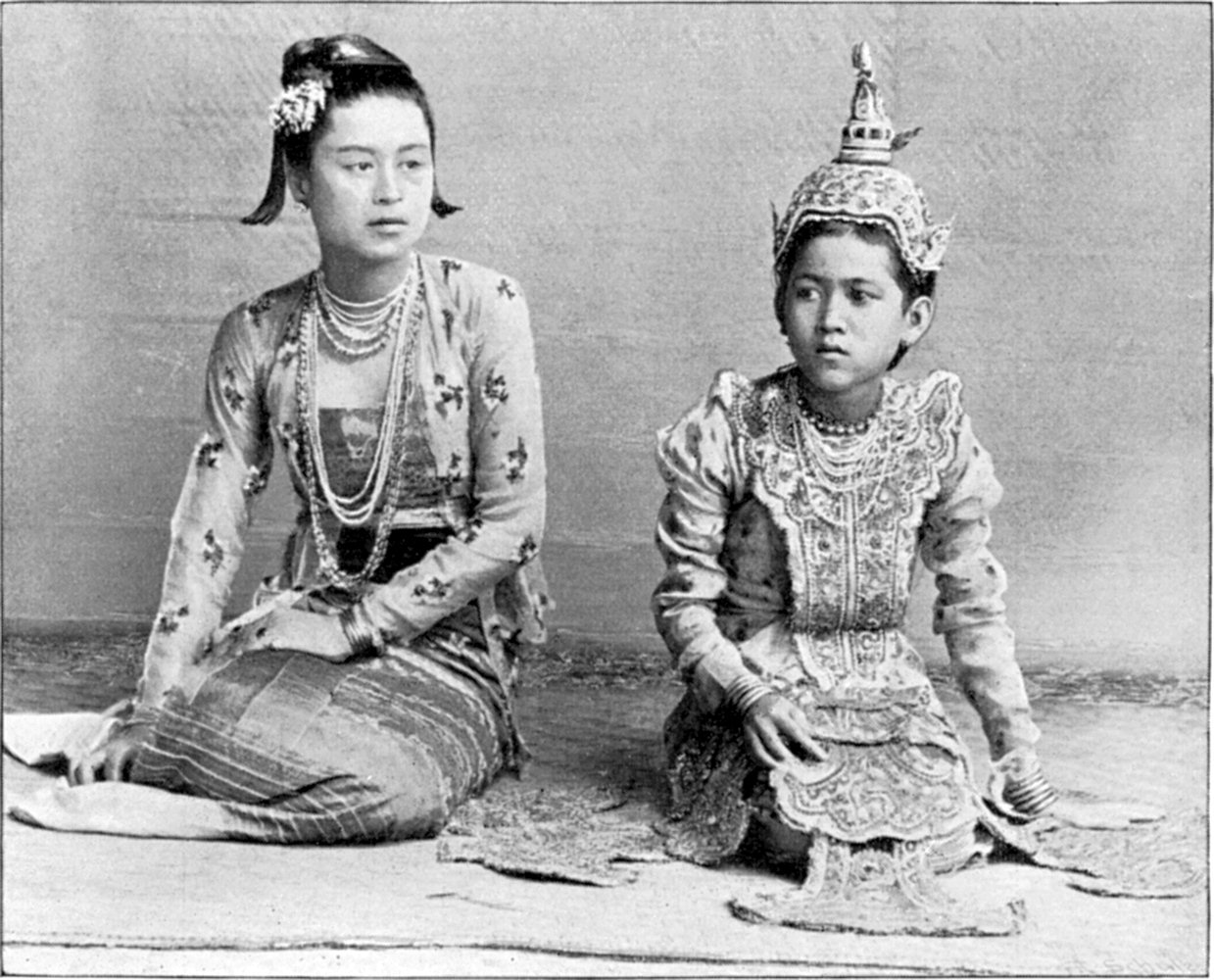

== See also ==
- Burmese clothing
- Kebaya
