= Luksong tinik =

Children's game in the Philippines

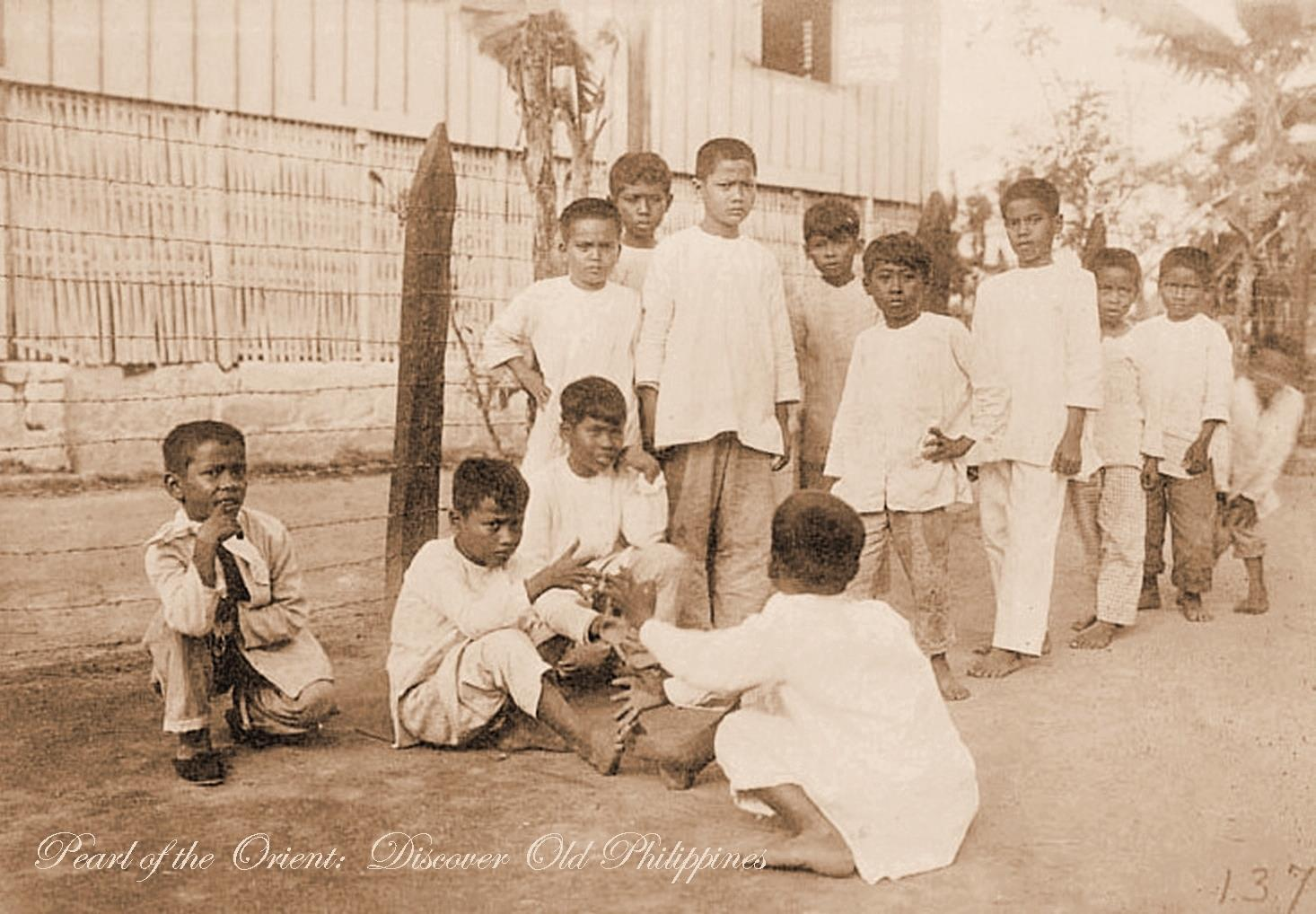
Luksong tinik in Manila, 1910. Photographic image from the Smithsonian Libraries National Anthropological Archives

Luksong tinik (English: "jumping over thorns") is a popular game in the Philippines. It is originated in Cabanatuan, Nueva Ecija, played by two teams with equal numbers of players. Each team designates a leader, the nanay (mother), while the rest of the players are called anak (children). The players chosen to be nanay are usually the ones who can jump the highest. The game involves players sitting on the ground and other players jumping over parts of their body.

Essentially, each person jumps over other people's feet which is meant to be the tinik, which one foot/hand of the two players sitting on the ground will be added after all players have jumped the first round.

In Myanmar, a similar game is known as Hpan Khone and is played mostly by girls.

This game can be challenging and is in the category Traditional Filipino games.
