= Kyin =

Wrestling form in Myanmar

Kyin (Burmese: ကျင်) is a form of wrestling from Myanmar. It is practiced by the Rakhine people in Myanmar. Tournaments of this sport are usually held during big occasions, for example, Rakhine State Day events.

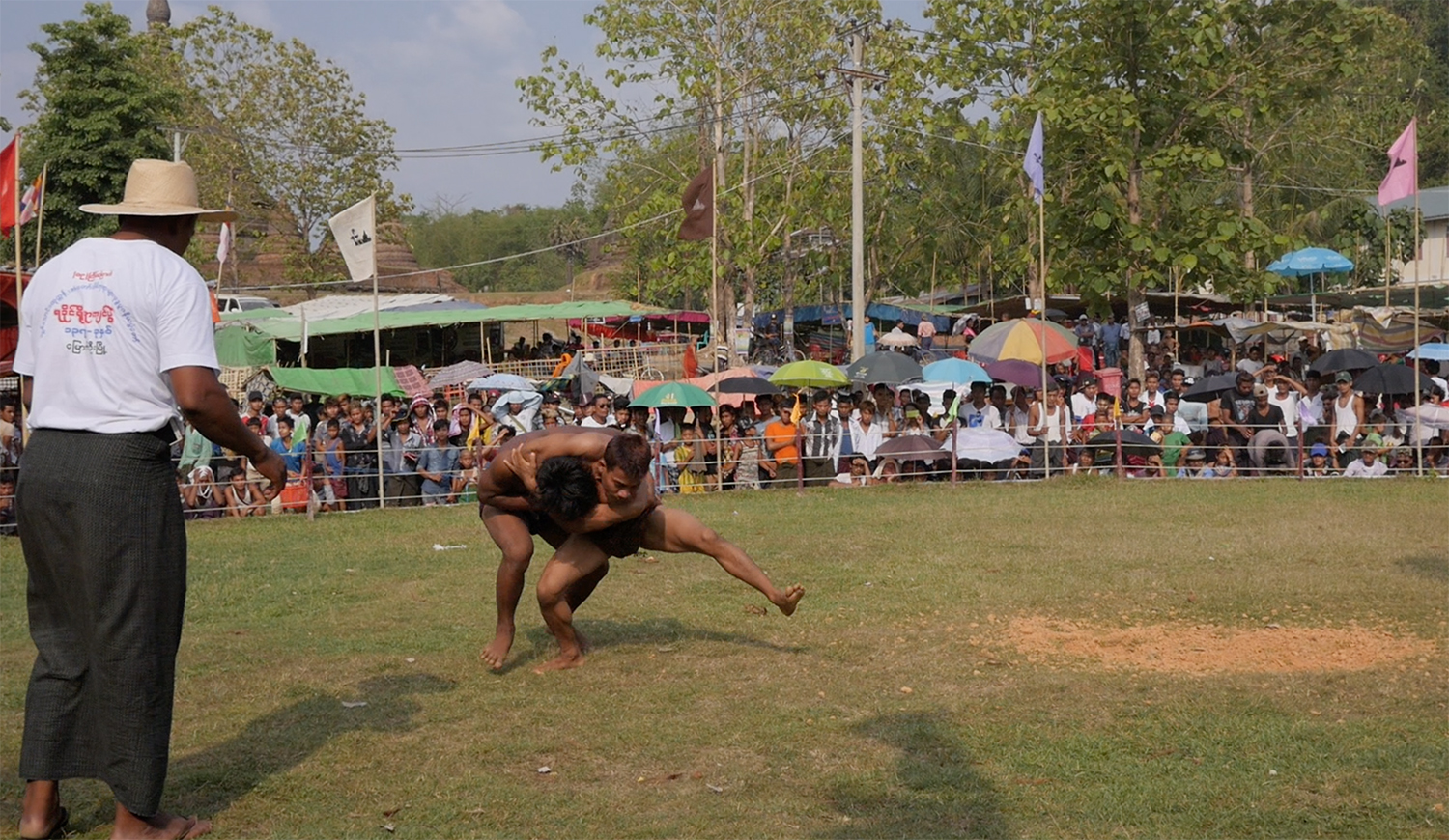
Rakhine Kyin Wrestling during 2017 Thingyan Festival in Mrauk-U

In Kyin wrestling tournaments, practitioners usually put on a display of warming-up dancing, which is called "kyin kwin" in the local language. Then the fighting begins. The rules are simple. No punching. No touching on the face, and no attacking below the belt. The wrestler who throws his opponent to the ground a fixed number of times wins.

Rakhine Kyin Wrestling during 2017 Thingyan Festival in Mrauk-U

The walls near the cave of Shite-thaung Temple which was built in 1531 show early depiction of the sport of kyin wrestling.

== See also ==
- Naban
- Khmer traditional wrestling

== APA References ==
- Aung, N. (2013, December 22). For love of the fight. Myanmar Times. Retrieved July 15, 2020, from https://www.mmtimes.com/lifestyle/9114-for-love-of-the-fight.html
- Kyin: the traditional Rakhine wrestling. (2018, September 2). Global New Light of Myanmar. Retrieved July 15, 2020, from https://www.globalnewlightofmyanmar.com/kyin-the-traditional-rakhine-wrestling/
- Olympic Council Of Asia - Myanmar. Retrieved Dec 16, 2020, from https://ocasia.org/noc/countries/45-mya-myanmar.html
- Information Ecosystems Paper 2: southern Rakhine, June 2020. Retrieved Dec 16, 2020, from https://coar-global.org/2020/06/21/information-ecosystems-paper-2-southern-rakhine/
