= Mani Yadanabon =

- Author: Shin Sandalinka
- Original title: မဏိ ရတနာပုံ
- Translator: L. E. Bagshawe
- Language: Burmese
- Series: Burmese chronicles
- Genre: Chronicle, History
- Publisher: Konbaung dynasty
- Publication date: 24 September 1781; 1871 (machine published)
- Publication place: Myanmar
- English publication date: 1981
- Media type: parabaik, paperback
- Pages: 399 (2009 edition)

The Mani Yadanabon (Burmese: မဏိ ရတနာပုံ ကျမ်း, pronounced [mənḭ jədənàbòʊɴ tɕáɴ]; also spelled Maniyadanabon or Mani-yadana-bon) is an 18th-century court treatise on Burmese statecraft and court organization. The text is a compilation of exemplary "advice offered by various ministers to Burmese sovereigns from the late 14th to the early 18th century." It is "a repository of historical examples illustrating pragmatic political principles worthy of Machiavelli".

It was also the first Burmese historical text to link Burmese kings to the Shakya clan of the Buddha and ultimately to Maha Sammata, the first king of the world in Buddhist tradition. It was one of the first four Burmese texts to be machine-published by the Burmese Konbaung dynasty in 1871.

== Overview ==
The Mani Yadanabon Kyan, "Treatise of Precious Jewelled Precedents", was completed on 24 September 1781 (Note: (Aung-Thwin 2017: 62): 7th waxing of Thadingyut 1143 ME = 24 September 1781) by Shin Sandalinka, a senior Buddhist monk and the recipient of a high royal title under King Singu's patronage. According to the author, the work was a compilation of several historical works and chronicles. It claims to describe the exemplary "advice offered by various ministers to Burmese sovereigns from the late 14th to the early 18th century". The book was probably modeled upon the Buddhist text Milinda Panha. "Each section typically begins with the king seeking advice on a historical problem," which is then followed by the minister's advice or submissions, supported by "a wealth of didactic examples from religious and historical literature". Sandalinka also interleaves "condensed and cannibalized" historical context before particular submissions.

About half of the compilation came from the 15th-century treatise Zabu Kun-Cha, which recounts famous submissions by the Chief Minister Min Yaza to kings from Swa Saw Ke to Minkhaung I of the early Ava dynasty. It also includes submissions from later periods by famous ministers, including the 16th century Chief Minister Binnya Dala, the author-translator of the chronicle Razadarit Ayedawbon. Nonetheless, the book is known mostly for the Min Yaza section, and commonly known as "Po Yaza's Submissions" (ဘိုးရာဇာ လျှောက်ထုံး). (Note: See (Sandalinka 2009) which is marketed under ဘိုးရာဇာ လျှောက်ထုံး, with the official name getting second billing.)

The treatise was held in high regard by the Konbaung government, the last Burmese dynasty. It was one of the first four Burmese texts to be machine-published, which "shows the priority it commanded".

== Analysis ==
The Mani Yadanabon belongs to a "largely unexplored Burmese literary genre dealing with statecraft and court organization". The book is "essentially a collection of moral tales," and "a repository of historical examples illustrating political principles worthy of Machiavelli." Still, the overall quality of the compilation is uneven. The most detailed and valuable part of this text, according to Aung-Thwin and Bagshawe, is the section on Min Yaza's submissions from (c. 1368–c. 1421), after which the quality declines. The Min Yaza section is "very likely a good preservation of the 15th century work Zabu Kun-Cha, parts of which can still be found in the palm-leaf copy of 1825". (Note: (Aung-Thwin 2005: 361): The 1825 manuscript of Zabu is in the India Office Library. Per Aung-Thwin, only Part VI is related to Zabu while the other five parts are not.)

Though not officially a chronicle, (Note: Some scholars such as Aung-Thwin (Aung-Thwin 2005) and (Hudson 2004) list and analyze the Mani Yadanabon alongside other chronicles.) Mani is noted for the amount of historical background information. However, much of Mani's accounts were "condensed and cannibalized" versions of then existing chronicles, and add little to the scholarly understanding of Burmese history. According to Lieberman, "[m]ost, if not all, of the material on the Ava period (1365−1555) may be found in greater detail and accuracy in various local chronicles, and more especially in the early 18th century national chronicle by U Kala, the Maha-ya-zawin-gyi."

To be sure, Mani does offer differing accounts from time to time, some of which may be more accurate than those offered in the standard chronicles. One notable example is that Mani says King Thamoddarit founded the royal capital of Pagan (Bagan) in 26 ME (664/665 CE), close to c. 650 CE, given by radiocarbon dating, and in contrast to the 107 CE date given in the standard chronicles. Its accession year for King Minkhaung I is also more accurate than that given in the standard chronicles. (Note: See (Sandalinka 2009: 65) for Minkhaung I's start of reign of 762 ME (1400/01) versus 763 ME (1401/02) by Maha Yazawin and Hmannan Yazawin. Per (Than Tun 1959: 128), Minkhaung I came to power on 25 November 1400 according to inscriptional evidence.) However, the author did not synthesize differing dates, which likely came from different sources. For example, the text says Sri Ksetra and Pagan were contemporary to each other but the dates given for Sri Ksetra and Pagan are five centuries apart. Another notable mixed narrative is that Mani like Zabu does not mention King Anawrahta's conquest of Thaton at all. But it reverses Zabu's account that a company of monks took the Buddhist scriptures from Pagan to Thaton; instead, like Maha Yazawin's account, Mani states that the monks brought the scriptures from Thaton to Pagan.

Perhaps most importantly, Mani also marks the earliest appearance in the Burmese histories of Maha Sammata, the first human king of the world in Buddhist mythology, and Abhiyaza as the founder of the first Burmese state of Tagaung. (Note: Per (Charney 2002), the earliest evidence of linking of the monarchs to Abhiyaza and the clan of the Buddha was in the 1450s in Arakan (Rakhine). The Arakanese tradition had gotten more elaborate by the early 17th century, and continued to develop well into the 18th century, and reached Central Burma. Early Konbaung kings of Central Burma starting in the 1770s began an effort to delink then pre-Buddhist origin myth of the Burmans with a more universal (Buddhist) myth that the Abhiyaza myth represented. The first official Konbaung chronicle Hmannan Yazawin (1832) not only adopted the Abhiyaza myth of Arakan but also introduced a Daza Yaza myth, essentially a repeat of the Abhiyaza myth, to specifically link the Konbaung kings to the Buddha.) This origin myth allows all Burmese kings to descend from the clan of the Buddha in an apparent attempt legitimize the Konbaung kings by religious criteria. According to Hudson, "the section covering the time before Bagan could be viewed as a retrospective addition by the compilers of chronicles, designed to fill the period back to the Buddha with authentic dynasties." Nonetheless, the claim would later be officially adopted in the 1832 Hmannan Yazawin, the first official chronicle of Konbaung dynasty.

== Translations ==
L. E. Bagshawe translated the Min Yaza section into English. The partial translation, which represented "somewhat under half of the total", was published in 1981 under the name of The Maniyadanabon of Shin Sandalinka.

== Bibliography ==
- Aung-Thwin, Michael A. (2005). The Mists of Rāmañña: The Legend that was Lower Burma (illustrated ed.). Honolulu: University of Hawai'i Press. ISBN 978-0-8248-2886-8.
- Aung-Thwin, Michael A. (2017). Myanmar in the Fifteenth Century. Honolulu: University of Hawai'i Press. ISBN 978-0-8248-6783-6.
- Bagshawe, L. E. (1981). The Maniyadanabon of Shin Sandalinka. Data Paper, Southeast Asia Program. Ithaca: Southeast Asia Program, Cornell University. ISBN 0877271151.
- Charney, Michael Walter (2002). "Centralizing Historical Tradition in Precolonial Burma: The Abhiraja/Dhajaraja Myth in Early Kon-baung Historical Texts". South East Asia Research. 10 (2): 185–215. doi:10.5367/000000002101297053. ISSN 0967-828X. S2CID 143753605.
- Hla Pe, U (1985). Burma: Literature, Historiography, Scholarship, Language, Life, and Buddhism. Singapore: Institute of Southeast Asian Studies. ISBN 978-9971-988-00-5.
- Hudson, Bob (2004). "The Origins of Bagan: The archaeological landscape of Upper Burma to AD 1300". Sydney: The University of Sydney.
- Lieberman, Victor B. (1983). "Review of L. E. Bagshawe "The Maniyadanabon of Shin Sandalinka"". Journal of the Royal Asiatic Society of Great Britain & Ireland. New Series. 115. Cambridge University: 336–337. doi:10.1017/S0035869X00138018. S2CID 163320689.
- Sandalinka, Shin (1781). Mani Yadanabon (in Burmese) (2009, 4th printing ed.). Yangon: Seit-Ku Cho Cho.
- Than Tun (December 1959). "History of Burma: A.D. 1300–1400". Journal of Burma Research Society. XLII (II).
- Woolf, Daniel (2011). A Global History of History (reissue, illustrated ed.). Cambridge, UK: Cambridge University Press. ISBN 978-0-521-69908-2.
