= Pyusawhti =

Pyusawhti ပျူစောထီး
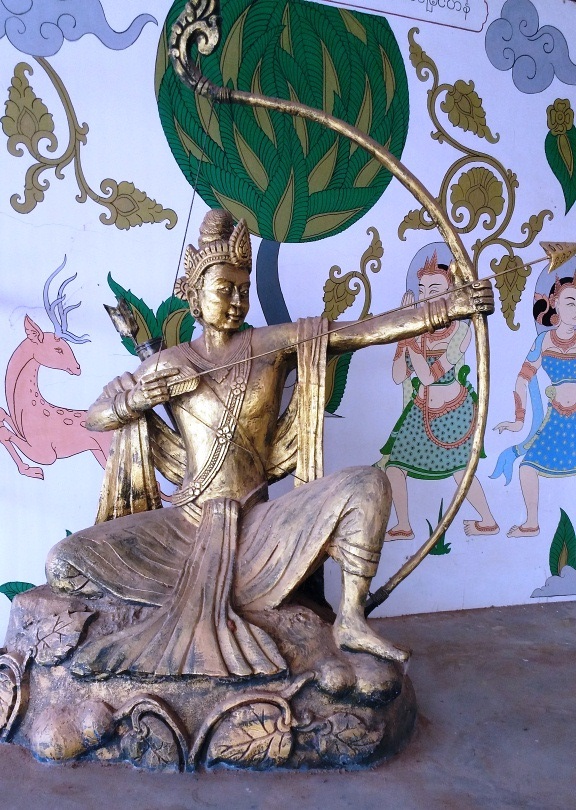

King of Pagan
- Reign: c. 167–242/243 CE or late 8th century CE
- Predecessor: Yathekyaung
- Successor: Hti Min Yin
- Born: 133? Tagaung?
- Died: 242 or 243? (aged 109); Pagan (Bagan)
- Consort: Thiha Htet Zaw
- House: Tagaung

Pyusawhti (Burmese: ပျူစောထီး , pronounced [pjù sɔ́ tʰí]; also Pyuminhti, ပျူမင်းထီး [pjù mɪ́ɴ tʰí]) was a legendary king of Pagan Dynasty of Burma (Myanmar), who according to the Burmese chronicles supposedly reigned from 167 to 242 CE. The chronicles down to the 18th century had reported that Pyusawhti, a descendant of a solar spirit and a dragon princess, was the founder of Pagan—hence, Burmese monarchy. However Hmannan Yazawin, the Royal Chronicle of Konbaung Dynasty proclaimed in 1832 that he was actually a scion of Tagaung Kingdom and traced his lineage all the way to Maha Sammata, the first king of the world in Buddhist mythology.

Scholarship conjectures that Pyusawhti the historical figure likely existed in the mid-to-late 8th century, who perhaps came over from the Nanzhao Kingdom as part of the Nanzhao raids of the Irrawaddy valley during the period.

== Mythical Origins ==
Luce argues that Pyusawhti and his son Hti Min Yin are borrowing of previous Nanzhao mythology. Pyusawhti is claimed to be a derivative of 漂苴低 (Pinyin:Piào jū dī) and his son Hti Min Yin being a derivation of 低蒙苴 (Pinyin:Dī méng jū) (Note: The Character jū (苴) is pronounced Xié (斜) according to the document's copyists, which in Middle Chinese is closer to "zjae"). They are mythologically the descendants of the Buddhist Emperor Ashoka, written as 阿育 (Pinyin:Āyù), which Nanzhao genealogies claim all the races of the world descended from. As the early Burmans were not Buddhist, Luce argues that the initial Buddhist mythology was not incorporated. The text concerning the figures is the Unofficial History of Nanzhao (南诏野史).

== Legend ==
The pre-Hmannan Burmese chronicles claim that Pyusawhti, a descendant of a solar spirit (နေမင်းသား) and a dragon princess (နဂါးမင်းသမီး ဇံသီး), founded Pagan in 167/168 CE, and hence the Burmese monarchy. The dragon princess, granddaughter of the Dragon Emperor Kala Naga, was impregnated by the solar spirit who was visiting the earth. Out of this union, the dragon princess laid three eggs, all of which a hunter took away. The hunter accidentally broke the gold-colored egg of the three at Mogok, and the broken golden egg turned into numerous rubies and gems (for which the Mogok region is known to the present-day). The hunter then lost the remaining two eggs during one heavy storm. One egg, in brown color, ended up in a small kingdom in either northern Burma (Thindwe or Tagaung) or Yunnan, and out came a female human princess, who later became queen of that kingdom. The remaining egg, in white color, drifted down the Irrawaddy all the way to Nyaung-U, where it was picked up by an elderly childless Pyu peasant couple. When the egg hatched, Pyusawhti was born. The Pyu couple raised him like their own son. He was then educated by a local monk named Yathekyaung.

In 1832, however, the chroniclers of Hmannan rejected this pre-Buddhist origin story. They instead introduced a new origin story which traces the origin of the monarchy to a Sakya prince Abhiyaza who founded the Tagaung Kingdom. Hmannan asserts that Pyusawhti was actually a scion of this Tagaung royalty. His parents were now human beings—Thado Aditsa Yaza (lit. the "Sun King" in Pali) of Tagaung descent, and his wife who had wished for a son at a local shrine in honor of the dragon princess.

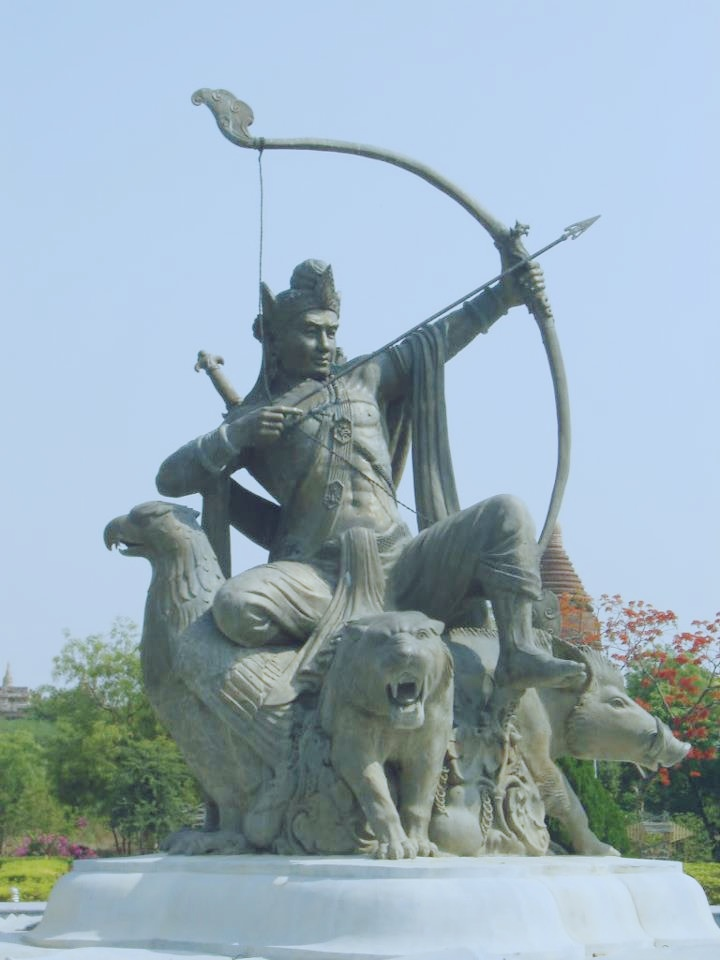
Statue of Pyusawhti, Conqueror of the Four Beasts in front of the Bagan Museum.

Hmannan continues that the young Pyusawhti began his education at seven at the local monastery run by a monk named Yathekyaung. He received an education in arts, religion and martial arts. He excelled at archery. At 16, c. 149 CE, he left for the recently founded city of Pagan (Bagan) with his favorite bow, and was taken in by an elderly Pyu peasant couple who treated him like a son. He soon learned that the city's environs had been terrorized by four giant savage monsters: a Giant Bird, a Giant Boar, a Giant Tiger and a Giant Greater Glider. The Giant Bird was the most feared; it had been given a virgin girl every week for the previous 12 years. With his bow and arrows, he defeated the monsters, and was noticed by the king, Thamoddarit. The king then gave his daughter in marriage to Pyusawhti and made him his heir-apparent.

When Thamoddarit died in 152/153 CE, Pyusawhti instead gave the throne to his tutor Yathekyaung who ruled for another 15 years. Pyusawhti ascended the throne in 167/168 CE after Yathekyaung died. He extended his dominion to upper Irrawaddy, recovering the territory which had been lost to the Chinese in the previous years. His reign lasted over 75 years. He died at age 109 (in 110th year.)

== Historicity ==
Despite the legendary nature of both pre-Buddhist and Hmannan's Buddhist-inspired stories, a historical Pyusawhti likely existed. Historians conjecture that the historical Pyusawhti was likely a minor chief of the Nanzhao Kingdom, who was in the vanguard of the Nanzhao invasions of the upper Irrawaddy valley that began in 754 (and lasted until the 830s). Pyusawhti's Nanzhao origin is confirmed by the fact that the naming system of the early Pagan kings—Pyusawhti and his descendants for six generations—was identical to that of the Nanzhao kings where the last name of the father became the first name of the son. Pyusawhti's victory over the Chinese likely refers to the Nanzhao victory over the Chinese in the same era, in which Pyusawhti and his contingents may have participated.

The Pagan "kingdom" Pyusawhti led was likely a small settlement among many other small settlements in the area. (The chronicles count 19 settlements.) In the 8th century, Pagan was not yet a city or even a city-state, let alone a "kingdom". Though the earliest human settlement at Pagan is radiocarbon dated to c. 650 CE, mainstream scholarship holds that Pagan was founded only in the middle to late 9th century by the recently arrived Burman warriors and their families from Nanzhao. Furthermore, the 38 kings of Pagan Dynasty—from Pyusawhti to Sokkate, prior to the historically verified king Anawrahta—were probably contemporary chiefs of the Pagan area's settlements. According to the British colonial era historian GE Harvey, the Burmese chroniclers likely arranged the lists of rulers of early Burmese polities consecutively, "wishing to portray a continuous lineage stretching back to divine antiquity." (The consecutive order of the chronicle list does not fit well with the likely historical period of 290 years (754–1044) since it means the 38 kings reigned for an average of 7.63 years only. The chronicles list the kings over 850 years (167–1017 CE), an average of 22.37 years per king.)

== Legacy ==
In 1956, the Burmese government under U Nu devised a local village and town defence scheme, which used paramilitary units called 'Pyusawhti' to assist the Burmese military in counterinsurgency operations. The army attempted to disband and disarm them after the 1958 coup with mixed success.

The term 'Pyusawhti' re-emerged in the 2000s, used by Burmese media in reference pro-military networks and groups.

== See also ==
- Tagaung Kingdom
- Sri Ksetra Kingdom
- Pagan Dynasty

== Sources ==
- Aung-Thwin, Michael (2005). The mists of Rāmañña: The Legend that was Lower Burma (illustrated ed.). Honolulu: University of Hawai'i Press. ISBN 9780824828868.
- Charney, Michael W. (2006). Powerful Learning: Buddhist Literati and the Throne in Burma's Last Dynasty, 1752–1885. Ann Arbor: University of Michigan.
- Harvey, G. E. (1925). History of Burma: From the Earliest Times to 10 March 1824. London: Frank Cass & Co. Ltd.
- Lieberman, Victor B. (2003). Strange Parallels: Southeast Asia in Global Context, c. 800–1830, volume 1, Integration on the Mainland. Cambridge University Press. ISBN 978-0-521-80496-7.
- Luce, Gordon (1959). "Old Kyaukse and the Coming of the Burmans". Journal of the Burma Research Society. XLII (1).
- Myint-U, Thant (2006). The River of Lost Footsteps—Histories of Burma. Farrar, Straus and Giroux. ISBN 978-0-374-16342-6.
- Phayre, Lt. Gen. Sir Arthur P. (1883). History of Burma (1967 ed.). London: Susil Gupta.
- Royal Historical Commission of Burma (1832). Hmannan Yazawin (in Burmese). Vol. 1–3 (2003 ed.). Yangon: Ministry of Information, Myanmar.
- Than Tun (1964). Studies in Burmese History (in Burmese). Vol. 1. Yangon: Maha Dagon.

Pyusawhti Pagan Kingdom Born: c. 133 Died: 242/243?
Regnal titles
Preceded by Yathekyaung	King of Pagan c. 167 – 242/243?	Succeeded by Hti Min Yin
