= List of early and legendary monarchs of Burma =

List of the early polities in Upper Burma, Lower Burma and Arakan

This is a list of early and legendary monarchs of Burma (Myanmar). It covers the monarchs of the early polities in Upper Burma, Lower Burma and Arakan, according to the various royal chronicles. The list consists of two types. Some of the dynasties were likely derived from "Indian legends taken from Sanskrit or Pali originals" in order to link the Burmese monarchy to the Buddha. Many others were actual historical figures cloaked in pre-Buddhist legends, and probably existed in a different time period than that described in the chronicles. Moreover, many of these historical-based legendary figures were likely contemporaries of rival small settlements, rather than in the continuous lineage presented by the chronicles.

Unless otherwise noted, the regnal dates in this article are abbreviated to the first Western calendar year only although the Burmese calendar straddles the Western calendar. For example, the start of King Pyinbya's reign, 208 ME (25 March 846 to 24 March 847 CE), is shown here only as 846 (instead of 846/47).

== Upper Burma ==
=== First Tagaung dynasty ===
The first Tagaung dynasty was part of the Abhiyaza origin myth that made a "sudden appearance" in central Burma in 1781—in the treatise Mani Yadanabon. The myth was not part of any of the prior central Burmese chronicles and treaties, as well as those immediately after, including the 1798 Yazawin Thit chronicle. But the myth gained ascendancy with the Konbaung kings, and was finally included in the Hmannan Yazawin chronicle in 1832, officially linking the Konbaung and central Burmese kings to the Buddha. The proclamation was part of the regional traditions to link their leaders to the clan of the Buddha. The earliest evidence of such linkage was in Arakan in the 1450s. The Arakanese tradition had grown more elaborate by the early 17th century, and finally reached central Burma in the 18th century. It was embraced by the Konbaung kings who starting in the 1770s began an effort to delink the then prevailing pre-Buddhist origin myth of linking the monarchy to a solar spirit with a more universal (Buddhist) myth.

Monarch	Reign	Relationship	Notes
Abhiyaza	850–825 BCE		
Kanyaza Nge	825–?	Son	
Zambudipa Yaza		Son	
Thingatha Yaza		Son	
Weippanna Yaza		Son	
Dewata Yaza		Son	
Munika Yaza		Son	
Naga Yaza		Paternal uncle	
Einda Yaza		Brother	
Thamuti Yaza		Son	
Dewa Yaza		Son	
Maheindra Yaza		Son	
Wimala Yaza		Son	
Thihanu Yaza		Son	
Mingana Yaza		Son	
Kantha Yaza		Son	
Kaleinga Yaza		Son	
Thindwe Yaza		Son	
Thihala Yaza		Son	
Thamuti Yaza		Son	
Hantha Yaza		Brother	
Wara Yaza		Son	
Alaung Yaza		Son	
Kawlaka Yaza		Son	
Thuriya Yaza		Son	
Thingyi Yaza		Son	
Taingchit Yaza		Son	
Madu Yaza		Son	
Minhlagyi Yaza		Son	
Thanthu Thiha Yaza		Son	
Daninga Yaza		Son	
Heinda Yaza		Son	
Mawriya Yaza		Son	
Beinnaka Yaza		Son	

=== Second Tagaung dynasty ===
This is the list of kings of the second Tagaung dynasty per in the Hmannan Yazawin chronicle, which provides no reign dates except for the date when the Sri Ksetra Kingdom was founded by two princes from Tagaung. According to Michael Charney, the second Tagaung dynasty is simply a version of the same Abhiyaza myth—Daza Yaza/Dhajaraja is another title of Abhiyaza/Abhiraja—which the chroniclers of the Hmannan must have realized but nonetheless sequenced it as a successor dynasty to circumvent "any superior claim of legitimacy on the part of the royal line of western Burma" [Arakan].

Monarch	Reign	Relationship	Notes
Daza Yaza	c. 600 BCE–?		
Thado Taing-Ya			
Thado Yahta-Ya			
Thado Tagun-Ya			
Thado Hlanbyan-Ya			
Thado Shwe			
Thado Galon-Ya			
Thado Naga-Ya			
Thado Naga-Naing			
Thado Yahawlaw			
Thado Paungshe			
Thado Kyaukshe			
Thado Hsinlauk			
Thado Hsinhtein			
Thado Taingchit			
Thado Mingyi			
Thado Maha Yaza			His sons founded Sri Ksetra Kingdom in 483 BCE.

=== Sri Ksetra Kingdom BCE 483-84 ===
Monarch	Reign	Relationship	Notes
Maha Thanbawa	483–477 BCE	Son of Thado Maha Yaza of Tagaung	
Sula Thanbanwa	477–442	Brother	
Duttabaung	442–372	Son of Maha Thanbawa	Historical figure believed to have ascended the throne in 739 CE
Duttayan	372–350	Son	
Yan Baung	350–300	Son	
Yan Man	300–250	Son	
Yetkhan	250–219	Son	
Khanlaung	219–181	Son	
Letkhaing	181–147	Son	
Thirikhan	147–119	Son	
Thiriyit	119–110	Son	Last of Duttabaung's line
Taba	110–59	Adopted son	
Papiyan	59 BCE–7 CE	Son	
Yan Mukha	7–22	Son	
Yan Theinkha	22–25	Son	
Yan Monsaleinda	25–40	Son	
Bereinda	40–52	Brother	
Monsala	52–57	Son	
Ponna	57–60	Son	
Thakha	60–63	Brother	
Thathi	63–66	Son	
Kan Nu	66–67	Younger brother	
Kan Tet	67–70	Elder brother	
Beizza	70–74	Elder brother	
Thumondari	74–81	Not stated	
Atitya	81–84	Son	
Thupyinnya	84–94	Brother	End of the Sri Ksetra dynasty

=== Early Pagan ===
==== Formative Early Pagan ====
The following is the list of Pagan kings as given in the main royal chronicles.

Name	Reign per Zatadawbon Yazawin	Reign per Maha Yazawin, Yazawin Thit, and Hmannan Yazawin	Relationship with the predecessor
Thamoddarit	80–125	107–152	Nephew of Thupyinnya of Sri Ksetra
Yathekyaung	125–140	152–167	Caretaker
Pyusawhti	140–222	167–242	Son-in-law of Thamoddarit
Hti Min Yin	222–249	242–299	Son
Yin Min Paik	249–334	299–324	Son
Paik Thinli	334–371	324–344	Son
Thinli Kyaung I	371–415	344–387	Son
Kyaung Tu Yit	415–440	387–412	Son
Thihtan	440–477	412–439	Son
Thuye	477–492	439–494	Usurper
Tharamun Pya	492–514	494–516	Grandson of Thihtan
Thaik Taing	514–521	516–523	Son
Thinli Kyaung II	521–530	523–532	Son
Thinli Paik	530–535	532–547	Brother
Khan Laung	535–545	547–557	Brother
Khan Lat	545–557	557–569	Brother
Htun Taik	557–570	569–582	Son
Htun Pyit	570–586	582–598	Son
Htun Kyit	586–613	598–613	Son

==== Middle Early Pagan (AD 613-846) ====
All four main chronicles are in agreement with the regnal dates in this period.

Name	Reign per Zatadawbon Yazawin, Maha Yazawin, Yazawin Thit, and Hmannan Yazawin	Relationship with the predecessor
Popa Sawrahan	613–640	Usurper
Shwe Ohnthi	640–652	Son-in-law
Peit Thon	652–660	Brother
Peit Taung	660–710	Son
Nga Khwe	710–716	Brother
Min Kywe	716–726	Usurper
Theinga	726–734	Elected by court; of royal blood
Thein Khun	734–744	Son
Shwe Laung	744–753	Son
Htun Htwin	753–762	Son
Shwe Hmauk	762–785	Son
Htun Lut	785–802	Brother
Saw Khin Hnit	802–829	Son
Khelu	829–846	Son

==== Late Early Pagan (846-1044) ====
The chronicles again do not agree with the dates for this period. The dates in later chronicles Yazawin Thit and Hmannan Yazawin now depart from Maha Yazawin dates from 846 CE forward.

Name	Reign per Zatadawbon Yazawin	Reign per Maha Yazawin	Reign per Yazawin Thit and Hmannan Yazawin	Relationship with predecessor(s)
Pyinbya	846–886	846–858	846–878	Brother
Tannet	886–904	858–876	878–906	Son
Sale Ngahkwe	904–934	876–901	906–915	Usurper
Theinhko	934–956	901–917	915–931	Son
Nyaung-u Sawrahan	956–1001	917–950	931–964	Usurper
Kunhsaw Kyaunghpyu	1001–1021	950–971	964–986	Son of Tannet
Kyiso	1021–1038	971–977	986–992	Son of Nyaung-u Sawrahan
Sokkate	1038–1044	977–1002	992–1017	Brother

== Lower Burma ==
=== Thaton Kingdom ===
Monarch	Reign	Relationship	Notes
Thiha Yaza	?–543 BCE		Died in the year the Buddha died; came from India
Dhamma Thawka I			
Titha			Tissa
Dhamma Pala			
Dhamma Daza			
Einkura			
Upadewa Yaza			
Thiwa Yaza			
Zawta Kumma			
Dhamma Thawka II			
Uttara			
Katha Wunna			
Maha Thala			
Araka			
Narathu I			
Maha Beinda			
Adara			
Angula			
Urunnata			
Thuganda I			
Thuganda II			
Bramah Datta			
Manya Yaza			
Adika			
Maradi Yaza			
Thaduka			
Dipa Yaza I			
Athinkha Yaza			
Bomma Yaza			
Manda Yaza			
Mahintha Yaza			
Dhamma Sekka Yaza			
Thusanbadi			
Baddara Yaza			
Narathu II			
Zambudipa Yaza			
Ketharit Yaza			
Wizaya Kumma			
Mani Yaza			
Tekka Min			
Athinkha Yaza			
Kutha Yaza			
Dipa Yaza II			
Nara Yaza			
Yaza Thura			
Seitta Yaza			
Diga Yaza			
Ottama Yaza			
Thiri Yaza			
Dhamma Yaza			
Maha Seitta Yaza			
Ganda Yaza			
Zeya Yaza			
Thumana Yaza			
Maddaka Yaza			
Aminna Yaza			
Udinna Yaza			
Manuha	?–1057 CE		

=== Early Hanthawaddy ===
The list here is per Harvey who reported it from the Shwemawdaw Thamaing (lit. "History of Shwemawdaw Pagoda"); the dates are unattested. Other Mon Chronicles give a similar list of rulers from 573 to 781 with no records thereafter, leaving a gap of 276 years to Pagan's conquest of Pegu in 1057. Harvey's list better synchronizes with historically confirmed Pagan dates. But according to Michael Aung-Thwin, pre-Pagan Mon kingdoms of Lower Burma are later 15th century legends, unattested by evidence. Pegu as a place name only first appeared in a 1266 Old Burmese inscription.

Monarch	Reign	Relationship	Notes
Thamala	825–837		Founds Pegu (Bago) in 825
Wimala	837-854	Brother	
Atha	854–861	Nephew	
Areindama	861–885	Son	
A monk	885–902		
Geinda	902–917		
Migadeippa I	917–932		
Geissadiya	932–942		
Karawika	942–954		
Pyinzala	954–967	Son	
Attatha	967–982	Brother	
Anuyama	982–994	Nephew	
Migadeippa II	994–1004		
Ekkathamanda	1004–1016		
Uppala	1016–1028		
Pontarika	1028–1043		Founds Dagon
Tissa	1043–1057		

== Rulers of Arakan ==
=== First Danyawaddy (2666–825 BCE) ===
Monarch	Reign	Relationship	Notes
Marayu	2666–2604		Reign for 62 years
Mara Zi I	2604–2572	son	Reign for 32 years
Mara Onlin	2572–2519	son	Reign for 53 years
Mara Rwaylin	2519–2471	son	Reign for 48 years
Mara Bin	2471–2416	son	Reign for 55 years
Mara Zi II	2416–2383	son	Reign for 33 years
Mara Kin	2383–2351	son	Reign for 32 years
Nga Sha Po	2351–2330		usurper
Dwara Sanda	2330–2290		son of Mara Kin
Thola Sanda	2290–2257	son	
Sanda Thuriya Sanda	2257–2220	son	
Kala Sanda	2220–2180	son	
Ti Sanda	2180–2149	son	
Madhutha Sanda	2149–2129	son	
Zeya Sanda	2129–2089	nephew	
Mokkha Sanda	2089–2063	son	
Gunna Sanda	2063–2051	son	
Three Nobles	2051–2050		usurpers; reigned 7 days, 3 months, and 8 months successively
Kan Raza I	2050–2009		grandson of Gunna Sanda
Kan Raza II	2009–1973	brother	
Athurinda Thuriya	1973–1938	uncle	
Tharameta	1938–1880	son	
Thuriya	1880–1849	son	
Min Thi	1849–1827	brother	
Min Ba	1827–1805	son	
Si Aung	1805–1777	son	
Tataingthin	1777–1746	brother	
Kyaw-Khaung Win	1746–1715	son	
Thuriya Nandameit	1715–1694	son	
Athu Yindabaya	1694–1663	son	
Letya Sithugyi	1663–1631	son	
Thihaka	1631–1588	son	
Min Bun Than	1588–1557	son	
Thayet Hmwe	1557–1508	son	
Zeya Nandathu	1508–1457	son	
Tekkathu	1457–1411	son	
Lekkhana	1411–1374	son	
Gunnarit	1374–1326	son	
Thiwarit	1326–1285	son	
Min Hla Hmwe	1285–1254	son	
Marinda	1254–1192	son	
Theiddat Kumara	1192–1170	son	
Min Hla I	1170–1123	son	
Min Hla II	1123–1099	brother	
Nga Sarit	1099–1061	son	
Myet-hna Wun	1061–1030	son	
Let Thut Kyi	1030–1003	son	
Thiri Kamma Thunda	1003–972	brother	
Nanda Kotabaya	972–945	son	
Min Nan Phyu	945–925	son	
Min Manu	925–897	son	
Minkhaung	897–878	son	
Laukkhaung Raza	878–838	son	
Min Nge Pyaw-Hla-Si	838–832	son	
Three nobles	832–825		usurpers

=== Second Danyawaddy (825 BCE–146 CE) ===
Monarch	Reign	Relationship	Notes
Kan Raza III	825–788		
Thila Raza	788–740	son	
Wasa Thura	740–709	son	
Nandawi Thura	709–669	son	
Puna Thuriya	669–637	son	
Thuranda	637–614	son	
Sandima	614–577	son	
Thiri Sanda	577–537	son	
Thiha Ran	537–491	brother	
Thiha Nu	491–471	son	
Payaka	471–440	son	
Nela Gun	440–399	son	
Rohaha Gun	399–368	son	
Thiri Gun	368–344	son	
Thamaza	344–309	nephew	
Kummara	309–289	son	
Thet Htin Phyu	289–249	son	
Tha Bin U	249–207	son	
Teza Wun	207–171	brother	
Munzayaba	171–137	son	
Kummara Withuddi	137–50	uncle	
Wathu Mun Dala	50–16	son	
Thurinda	16 BCE–15 CE	son	
Ralamayu	15–37	brother	
Nalamayu	37–68	son	
Wada Gun	68–90	son	
Withu Raza	90–111	son	
Thiri Raza	111–146	son	

=== Third Danyawaddy (146–788 CE) ===
Monarch	Reign	Relationship	Notes
Sanda Thuriya	146–198		
Thuriya Dipati	198–245	son	
Thuriya Patipat	245–298	son	
Thuriya Rupa	298–313	son	
Thuriya Mandala	313–375	son	
Thuriya Wunna	375–418	son	
Thuriya Natha	418–459	son	
Thuriya Wuntha	459–468	son	
Thuriya Banda	468–474	son	
Thuriya Kalyana	474–492	son	
Thuriya Mokkha	492–513	son	
Thuriya Teza	513–544	son	
Thuriya Ponnya	544–552	son	
Thuriya Kala	552–575	son	
Thuriya Pabba	575–600	son	
Thuriya Sitya	600–618	son	
Thuriya Thehta	618–640	son	
Thuriya Wimala	640–648	son	
Thuriya Renu	648–670	brother	
Thuriya Gantha	670–686	son	
Thuriya Thagya	686–694	uncle	
Thuriya Thiri	694–714	son	
Thuriya Kethi	714–723	son	
Thuriya Kutta	723–746	son	
Thuriya Ketu	746–788	son	

=== Waithali (788–1018 CE) ===
Monarch	Reign	Relationship	Notes
Maha Taing Sanda	788–810	founder	son of Thuriya ketu
Thuriya Taing Sanda	810–830	son	
Mawla Taing Sanda	830–849	son	
Pawla Taing Sanda	849–875	son	
Kala Taing Sanda	875–884	son	
Tula Taing Sanda	884–903	son	
Thiri Taing Sanda	903–935	son	
Thinkha Taing Sanda	935–951	son	
Chula Taing Sanda	951–957	son	
Amyahtu	957–964		Chief of Myu people
Pe Phyu	964–994	nephew	
Nga Pin Nga Ton	994–1018		son of Chula Taing Sanda
