= Kanyaza Gyi =

Kanyaza Gyi ကံရာဇာကြီး

King of Dhanyawaddy
- Reign: 825–788 BCE
- Predecessor: Founder
- Successor: Thila Raza
- Born: 861 BC; Tagaung
- Died: 788 BCE (aged 73); Danyawaddy, Arakan
- Consort: Thubadda Dewi (သုဘဒ္ဒါဒေဝီ)
- Father: Abhiyaza
- Religion: Hinduism

Kanraza Gyi (Burmese: ကံရာဇာကြီး, pronounced [kàɰ̃jàzà dʑí]; also spelled Kanraza Gree) was the legendary founder of the Second Dhanyawaddy Dynasty of Arakan. According to Hmanan Yazawin (the Glass Palace Chronicle), Kanyaza Gyi was the eldest son of King Abhiyaza of Tagaung, a prince of the Sakya clan of the Buddha who came from the ancient kingdom of Kosala (present-day northern India). After his father died in 825 CE, Kanyaza Gyi lost out the throne to his younger brother Kanyaza Nge. He left Tagaung with his followers. He eventually settled at the abandoned capital of Danyawaddy in present-day Rakhine State, and founded the Second Danyawaddy Dynasty.

== Reign ==
Kanraza Gyi was born in Tagaung 861 BC, after his father Abhiyaza died he lost the throne to his younger brother after race to complete pogoda. He left the kingdom eventually settled in Dhanyawdi later founded the Second Dhanyawadi Kingdom of Arakan following through the Chindwin River pass. He married queen Thubbada Dewi of Dhanywaddy. Where his descendants became today known as "Rakhine" or "Arakanese". He ruled for 37 years and was succeeded by his son, Thila Raza.

The story of Abhiyaza, Kanyaza Gyi and Kanyaza Nge appeared for the first time in an official Burmese royal chronicle only in 1832, part of the efforts by the early Konbaung kings to promote a more orthodox version of Theravada Buddhism. The Abhiyaza story linked the Burmese monarchy to the Buddha and superseded then prevailing pre-Buddhist origin story involving one Pyusawhti, son of a solar spirit and a dragon princess.

== See also ==
- History of Rakhine

== Notes ==
Kanyaza Gyi Danyawaddy Kingdom Born: 861 Died: 788 BCE
Regnal titles
Preceded by ?	King of Danyawaddy; 825 – 788 BCE	Succeeded by Thila Raza
