= Shin Sandalinka =

Shin Sandalinkā ရှင်စန္ဒလင်္ကာ
- Title: Zinalinkara Maha Dhammayazaguru

Religious life
- Religion: Buddhism
- School: Theravada
- Dharma names: Candalaṅkā

Senior posting
- Based in: Ava (Inwa)

Shin Sandalinka (Burmese: ရှင်စန္ဒလင်္ကာ, Pali: Candalaṅkā; pronounced [ʃɪ̀ɴ sàɴda̰lɪ̀ɴgà]) was an 18th-century Burmese Buddhist monk, who wrote the influential court treatise Mani Yadanabon in 1781. He held a high religious title, Zinalinkara Maha Dhammayazaguru (ဇိနလင်္ကာရ မဟာ ဓမ္မရာဇဂုရု, Pali: Jinalankāra Mahā Dhammarājaguru), bestowed by King Singu. He compiled the Mani Yadanabon from various sources, chiefly the late 14th to 15th century Zabu Kun-Cha treatise. His treatise was one of the four books to be machine-published by the Konbaung government in 1871.

== Bibliography ==
- Aung-Thwin, Michael A. (2005). The Mists of Rāmañña: The Legend that was Lower Burma (illustrated ed.). Honolulu: University of Hawai'i Press. ISBN 978-0-8248-2886-8.
- Bagshawe, L.E. "The Maniyadanabon of Shin Sandalinka" (115). Ithaca: Southeast Asia Program, Cornell University.
- Hudson, Bob (2004). "The Origins of Bagan: The archaeological landscape of Upper Burma to AD 1300" (Document). Sydney: The University of Sydney.
- Lieberman, Victor B. (1983). "Review of L. E. Bagshawe "The Maniyadanabon of Shin Sandalinka"". Journal of the Royal Asiatic Society of Great Britain & Ireland. New Series. 115. Cambridge University: 336–337. doi:10.1017/S0035869X00138018. S2CID 163320689.
- Sandalinka, Shin (1781). Mani Yadanabon (in Burmese) (2009, 4th printing ed.). Yangon: Seit-Ku Cho Cho.
