= Zabu Kun-Cha =

14th–15th century Burmese court treatise

- Author: Min Yaza of Wun Zin
- Original title: ဇမ္ဗူကွန်ချာ
- Translator: U Pe (1959); Thaung Lwin (2004)
- Language: Burmese
- Series: Burmese chronicles
- Genre: Chronicle, History
- Publisher: Ava Kingdom
- Publication date: late 14th to early 15th century
- Publication place: Myanmar
- English publication date: 1959, 2004
- Media type: parabaik

The Zabu Kun-Cha (Burmese: ဇမ္ဗူကွန်ချာ ကျမ်း, pronounced [zəbù kùɴ tɕʰa̰ tɕáɴ]; also spelled Zambu Kungya) is a late 14th to early 15th century court treatise on Burmese statecraft and court organization. The text also includes a section on early history of Myanmar, which mentions several settlements across Myanmar that map to the archaeologically known Pyu settlements. About half of the 18th century court treatise Mani Yadanabon comes from the Zabu.

== Brief ==
The Zabu Kun-Cha Kyan ("Treatise of Casting the Net over the Zabudipa") (Note: (Hudson 2004: 29): Casting of the net over Zabudipa (Pali: Jambudīpa), which represents the known terrestrial world in Burmese Buddhism, is "used to suggest a comprehensive overview.") is a compilation of famous advice offered by Chief Minister Min Yaza to kings Swa Saw Ke (r. 1367−1400) and Minkhaung I (r. 1400−22) of Ava. The authorship of the text is usually attributed to the minister himself. "Each section typically begins with the king seeking advice on a historical problem," which is then followed by the minister's advice or submissions, supported by "a wealth of didactic examples from religious and historical literature". (Note: (Lieberman 1983: 137)'s review on the English translation of the Mani Yadanabon, which covers only the Min Yaza portion, which is a reproduction of Zabu Kun-Cha.)

The text also includes a section on early history of Myanmar, which mentions several settlements across Myanmar that map to the archaeologically known Pyu settlements. It covers a sequence of capitals of ancient Myanmar, starting with the Pyu city of Halin, followed by Ava (Inwa), Mekkhaya, Pinle, Kaungsin, Allagappa, Legaing, Tagaung, Sri Ksetra, Pagan (Bagan), Myinsaing−Mekkhaya−Pinle, Ava, Pinya, Sagaing and Ava. The list is quite different from those of the standard chronicles, of which Hmannan in particular. Zabu is an early written text that mentions the spread of the Pyu city-states throughout the Irrawaddy valley from Tagaung to Sri Ksetra, and into the Panlaung and lower Mu and Chindwin valleys. According to Hudson, Zabu's authors apparently were aware that "the sites they listed all had some kind of archaeological evidence of antiquity. Kaungsin, Allagappa and Legaing, not prominent in other chronicles, were known to the author(s) when the Zabu was written."

While the text mainly deals with the precedents of Min Yaza, because of its historical sections, some scholars classify it a chronicle while others do not. The Zabu was later included in the 1781 treatise Mani Yadanabon, which also includes advice by later ministers. The Zabu portion represents "somewhat half under the total". It is through the Mani Yadanabon that the full text of Zabu or what is believed to be Zabu has survived. Only a portion of an 1825 copy of Zabu has survived. (Note: (Aung-Thwin 2005: 361): An 1825 manuscript of Zabu is in the British Library. Per Aung-Thwin, only Part VI is related to Zabu while the other five parts are not. (Hudson 2004: 284): Another handwritten copy exists in the Archaeology Department in the University of Mandalay.) The surviving text was translated to English by U Pe in 1959; another version was translated in 2004 by Thaung Lwin with editorial input from Win Maung.

== Bibliography ==
- Aung-Thwin, Michael A. (2005). The Mists of Rāmañña: The Legend that was Lower Burma (illustrated ed.). Honolulu: University of Hawai'i Press. ISBN 978-0-8248-2886-8.
- "The Maniyadanabon of Shin Sandalinka" (Document). Translated by Bagshawe, L.E. Ithaca: Southeast Asia Program, Cornell University. Data paper number 115.
- Hall, D.G.E. (1961). Historians of South East Asia. Vol. 2. Oxford University Press.
- Hudson, Bob (2004). The Origins of Bagan: The archaeological landscape of Upper Burma to AD 1300 (PhD). Sydney: The University of Sydney.
- Lieberman, Victor B. (1983). "Review of L. E. Bagshawe "The Maniyadanabon of Shin Sandalinka"". Journal of the Royal Asiatic Society of Great Britain & Ireland. New Series. 115. Cambridge University: 336–337. doi:10.1017/S0035869X00138018.
- Sandalinka, Shin (1781). Mani Yadanabon (in Burmese) (2009, 4th printing ed.). Yangon: Seit-Ku Cho Cho.
- Wade, Geoff (2012). "6". The Oxford History of Historical Writing. Vol. 3: 1400–1800. Oxford University Press. ISBN 9780191629440.
