= Kanyaza Nge =

Kanyaza Nge ကံရာဇာငယ်

King of Tagaung
- Reign: 825–? BCE
- Predecessor: Abhiyaza
- Successor: Zambudipa Yaza
- Born: Tagaung
- Died: Tagaung
- Father: Abhiyaza

Kanyaza Nge (Burmese: ကံရာဇာငယ်, pronounced [kàɰ̃jàzà ŋɛ̀]) was the king of Tagaung, who, according to Burmese chronicles, reigned in the 9th century BCE.

According to Hmannan Yazawin (the Glass Palace Chronicle), Kanyaza Nge was the younger son of King Abhiyaza of Tagaung, a prince of the Sakya clan of the Buddha who came from the ancient kingdom of Kosala (present-day northern India). After his father died in 825 CE, Kanyaza Nge won the throne over his elder brother Kanyaza Gyi, who subsequently left Tagaung with his followers. The elder brother eventually settled at the abandoned capital of Danyawaddy in present-day Rakhine State, and founded the Second Danyawaddy Dynasty. Meanwhile, Kanyaza Nge ruled Tagaung, and was followed by a dynasty of 31 kings to the 5th century BCE.

The legend of Abhiyaza, Kanyaza Gyi and Kanyaza Nge first appeared in an official Burmese royal chronicle only in 1832. The story was part of the efforts by the early Konbaung kings to link the Burmese monarchy to the Buddha, superseding then prevailing pre-Buddhist origin story of the monarchy.

== Notes ==
Kanyaza Nge Tagaung Kingdom Born: ? Died: ? BCE
Regnal titles
Preceded by Abhiyaza	King of Tagaung; 825 – ? BCE	Succeeded by Zambudipa Yaza
