= Pauck =

Pauck is a surname. Notable people with the surname include:

- Heinz Pauck (1904–1986), German screenwriter
- Thomas Pauck Rogne (born 1990), Norwegian professional footballer
- Wilhelm Pauck (1901–1981), German-American church historian, theologian and biographer

== See also ==
- Pauk (disambiguation)
