= Abhiyaza =

Abhiyaza အဘိရာဇာ

King of Tagaung
- Reign: 850–825 BCE
- Predecessor: Founder
- Successor: Kanyaza Nge
- Born: Kapilavastu, Kingdom of Kosala
- Died: 825 BCE; Tagaung
- Issue: Kanyaza Gyi; Kanyaza Nge
- House: Tagaung

Abhiyaza (Burmese: အဘိရာဇာ [ʔəbi̯jəzà], Abhirājā; d. 825 BCE) was the legendary founder of the Kingdom of Tagaung, and that of Burmese monarchy, according to the 19th century chronicle Hmannan Yazawin. He reportedly belonged to the same Sakya clan of the Buddha. However, prior Burmese chronicles down to the 18th century trace the origin of the monarchy to another legendary figure Pyusawhti, a descendant of a solar spirit and a dragon princess. Scholars view the Abhiyaza story as an attempt by the chroniclers of Hmannan to move away from then prevailing pre-Buddhist origin narrative of the monarchy.

== Legend ==
According to Hmannan, the origins of the Burmese monarchy trace back to the 9th century BCE India, more than three centuries before the Buddha was born. Abhiyaza (Abhiraja) was a prince of an ancient kingdom of Kosala (ကောသလ) in present-day northern India. He belonged to the Sakya clan (သကျ သာကီဝင် မင်းမျိုး)—the clan of the Buddha—and descended from the first Buddhist king Maha Sammata (မဟာ သမ္မတ) who reigned ages ago. (In Buddhist tradition, Gautama Buddha was only the latest in a line of 28 Buddhas.) Indeed, Prince Abhiyaza was lord of the Kapilavastu (ကပိလဝတ်) region of Kosala—the very birthplace of the historical Buddha three centuries later.

Around the mid-9th century BCE, Kosala went to war with the neighboring kingdom of Panchala (ပဉ္စာလရာဇ်). The cause of war was that the king of Panchala had asked the king of Kosala for his daughter's hand in marriage, and was rudely refused. The Panchala king conquered the Kosala kingdom, and the ruling clan of Kosala dispersed in three directions. One of them was Abhiyaza who with a group of his loyal followers trekked a long mountainous route all the way to present-day northern Burma, and founded a kingdom at Tagaung in 850 BCE.

Hmannan does not claim that he had arrived in an empty land, only that he was the first king. Abhiyaza had two sons. When he died, the elder son Kanyaza Gyi (ကံရာဇာကြီး) ventured south, and founded his own kingdom at Arakan in 825 BCE. The younger son Kanyaza Nge (ကံရာဇာငယ်) succeeded his father, and was followed by a dynasty of 31 kings. Some three and a half centuries later, in 483 BCE, scions of Tagaung founded yet another kingdom much farther down the Irrawaddy at Sri Ksetra, near modern Pyay (Prome). Sri Ksetra lasted nearly six centuries, and was succeeded in turn by the kingdom of Pagan. Hmannan continues that around 107 CE, Thamoddarit (သမုဒ္ဒရာဇ်), nephew of the last king of Sri Ksetra, founded the city of Pagan (Bagan) (formally, Arimaddana-pura (အရိမဒ္ဒနာပူရ), lit. "the City that Tramples on Enemies"). The site reportedly was visited by the Buddha himself during his lifetime, and it was where he allegedly pronounced that a great kingdom would arise at this very location 651 years after his death. Thamoddarit was followed by a caretaker, and then Pyusawhti in 167 CE.

Hmannan's narrative then merge with those of prior chronicles, and continues that a dynasty of kings followed Pyusawhti until the historical king Anawrahta ascended the throne in 1017 CE [sic]. (Anawrahta's inscriptionally verified date of accession is 1044 CE.)

== Historicity and significance ==
=== Rise of the legend ===
The Abhiyaza story first appeared in Hmannan Yazawin (the Glass Palace Chronicle), completed in 1832. The Burmese chronicles down to the early 18th century, including Maha Yazawin (the Great Chronicle) of 1724, upon which Hmannan is heavily based, do not mention Abhiyaza. Instead, the pre-Hmannan origin story of the Burmese monarchy speaks of one Pyusawhti, son of a solar spirit and a dragon princess, who later founded the Pagan Dynasty.

Historians trace the rise of the Abhiyaza story to the 1770s, part of the early Konbaung kings' efforts to promote a more orthodox version of Theravada Buddhism. The trend gained ground under King Bodawpaya (r. 1782–1819) who, like his father Alaungpaya, believed that he was the next Buddha, Maitreya. Though the king would later reluctantly give up his claim and accede to his late father's claim, his purification drive devalued "local sources of sanctity" in favor of "universal textual forms endorsed by the crown and the monkhood", and "outlawed animal sacrifices atop Mt. Popa and other sacred sites while female and transvestite shamans lost status." In the reign of his successor Bagyidaw in 1832, the pre-Buddhist origin story of Pyusawhti was officially superseded with the Abhiyaza story's "claims of royal descent from the clan of Gotama Buddha and thence the first Buddhist king of the world, Maha Sammata".

The Abhiyaza story was part of a region-wide phenomenon where, in addition to the Burmese Monarchs, various Buddhist states from as far afield as Dali Kingdom (present-day Yunnan) to Lan Na (Chiang Mai) and Nan (present-day northern Thailand) linked their royalty to the Buddha or the Buddhist Emperor Asoka. Various Shan chronicles, like the Hmannan, also claim their sawbwas' descent from the Buddha. (It is not clear when the similar linkages first appeared in Dali or Lan Na chronicles.)

=== Significance ===
The story of Abhiyaza had a devastating effect on the credibility of the Burmese chronicles in general, and the early history narratives in particular during the British colonial period. European scholars of the era outright dismissed the chronicle tradition of early Burmese history as "copies of Indian legends taken from Sanskrit or Pali originals". They highly doubted the antiquity of the chronicle tradition and dismissed the possibility that any sort of civilization in Burma could be much older than 500 CE. (Phayre 1883) puts Abhiyaza and his Tagaung dynasty under the List of Legendary Kings. (Harvey 1925) does not even include Abhiyaza and the Tagaung line in his list of monarchs; Harvey's list starts with the older origin story: Pyusawhti. One prominent historian on Burma, Than Tun, lamented the inclusion of the legend into the official chronicle in 1832 and bluntly criticized the chroniclers for giving colonial-era historians, who he felt had written heavily biased histories, ammunition to denigrate Burmese history.

Modern research has rehabilitated the credibility of the chronicles' early history to a degree. The Abhiyaza myth notwithstanding, recent research does indicate that many of the places mentioned in the royal records have indeed been inhabited continuously for at least 3500 years. Archaeological evidence indicates the states of Tagaung, Sri Ksetra, and Pagan all existed though not in the linear order portrayed in the chronicles.

== See also ==
- Tagaung Kingdom
- Sri Ksetra Kingdom
- Pagan Dynasty

== Bibliography ==
- Charney, Michael W. (2006). Powerful Learning. Buddhist Literati and the Throne in Burma's Last Dynasty, 1752-1885. Ann Arbor: University of Michigan.
- Charney, Michael W. (2002). 'Centralizing Historical Tradition in Precolonial Burma: The Abhiraja/Dhajaraja Myth in Early Kon-bauung Historical Texts.' South East Asia Research, 10 (2). pp. 185-215.
- Hall, D.G.E. (1960). Burma (3rd ed.). Hutchinson University Library. ISBN 978-1-4067-3503-1.
- Hardiman, John Percy (1900–1901). Sir James George Scott (ed.). Gazetteer of Upper Burma and the Shan States, Part 1. Vol. 1–2. Government of Burma Printing.
- Harvey, G. E. (1925). History of Burma: From the Earliest Times to 10 March 1824. London: Frank Cass & Co. Ltd.
- Htin Aung, Maung (1967). A History of Burma. New York and London: Cambridge University Press.
- Lieberman, Victor B. (2003). Strange Parallels: Southeast Asia in Global Context, c. 800–1830, volume 1, Integration on the Mainland. Cambridge University Press. ISBN 978-0-521-80496-7.
- Myint-U, Thant (2006). The River of Lost Footsteps—Histories of Burma. New York: Farrar, Straus and Giroux. ISBN 978-0-374-29907-1.
- Myint-U, Thant (2011). Where China Meets India: Burma and the New Crossroads of Asia. New York: Farrar, Straus and Giroux. ISBN 978-0-374-16342-6.
- Phayre, Lt. Gen. Sir Arthur P. (1883). History of Burma (1967 ed.). London: Susil Gupta.
- Ratchasomphan, Sænluang; David K. Wyatt (1994). David K. Wyatt (ed.). The Nan Chronicle (illustrated ed.). Ithaca: Cornell University SEAP Publications. ISBN 978-0-87727-715-6.
- Royal Historical Commission of Burma (1829–1832). Hmannan Yazawin (in Burmese). Vol. 1–3 (2003 ed.). Yangon: Ministry of Information, Myanmar.
- Than Tun (1964). Studies in Burmese History (in Burmese). Vol. 1. Yangon: Maha Dagon.

Abhiyaza Tagaung Kingdom Born: ? Died: 825 BCE
Regnal titles
Preceded by Founder	King of Tagaung; 850 – 825 BCE	Succeeded by Kanyaza Nge
