= Mara Rwaylin =

- King of Arakan
- Reign: 2519–2471 BCE
- Coronation: 2519 BCE
- Predecessor: Mara Onlin
- Successor: Marazin
- Born: 2549 BCE; Dhanyawadi
- Died: 2471 BCE (aged 78)
- Spouse: Queen Silabhi
- Issue: Marazin
- House: Dhanyawadi
- Father: Mara Onlin
- Mother: Queen Goyāja

Mara Rwaylin (Rakhine: မာရတင်, also known as Maratin) was the 4th king of Dhanyawaddy Kingdom from 2519 to 2471 BCE. He succeeded his father Mara Onlin and reigned for 48 years.

== Early life and reign ==
Mara Rwaylin was the son of King Mara Onlin and Queen Goyaja. He ascended the throne at the age of 30 upon his father's death in 2519 BCE. His coronation took place at the Dhanyawaddy Palace.

He was married to Queen Silabhi, who was also his younger sister (နှမတော်), a practice customary among royalty at the time to preserve dynastic purity. The couple had at least one son, Marazin, who later succeeded him.

The king's reigned for 48 years until is death. His is described as peaceful and stable. He likely oversaw the maintenance of Dhanyawaddy infrastructure inherited from previous reigns.

== Death ==
Mara Rwaylin died in 2471 BCE at the age of 78. He was succeeded to his son Marazin.

=== Chronicle Variations ===
Later versions of the chronicles differ in minor details. The Inzawk Chronicle omits the familial relationship between Maratin and Queen Silabhi. Additionally, an 18th-century version by Saya Nga exaggerates his reign length to 60 years, while the original texts confirm a 48-year rule.

== See also ==
- List of early and legendary monarchs of Burma

== Bibliography ==
- Sandamala Linkara, Ashin (1931). Rakhine Razawin Thit (in Arakanese). Vol. 1–2 (1997-1999 ed.). Rangoon: Tetlan Sarpay.
- U Uar Nha, Ashin (1930). Dhanyawaddy Razawin Thit (in Arakanese). Vol. 1–2 (2010 ed.). Yangon: Rakhine Thargyi Sarpay.
