= Manu =

Manu may refer to:

== Religion ==
=== Proto Indo European Mythology ===
- Manu (Indo European Mythology) one of the mythical duo Manu and Yemo

=== Ancient Mesopotamia ===
- Manu the Great, a Chaldean god of fate

=== Hinduism ===
- Manu (Hinduism), Hindu progenitor of mankind
  - Vaivasvata Manu, the current Manu
- Manusmṛti or Manu's code, an important early Hindu text
- Manu Needhi Cholan, a legendary Chola Dynasty king

== Geography ==
- Manu Province, a province of Peru, in the Madre de Dios Region
  - Manu National Park, Peru
  - Manu River, in southeastern Peru
- Manu River (Tripura), which originates in India and flows into Bangladesh
- Manu Temple, a summit in the Grand Canyon, United States
- Manu, Tripura, a village in Tripura, India
- Manu, a village in Topliţa Commune, Hunedoara County, Romania
- Manu, a village in Tâmna Commune, Mehedinţi County, Romania
- Moku Manu, an island in the Hawaiian islands

== People ==
- Manu (name)
- Manu Gavassi, Brazilian singer, songwriter and actress
- Manu (footballer, born 1966), João Manuel Rocha Monteiro Corrêa, Brazilian football forward
- Manu (footballer, born 1973), Manuel Francisco Cantero Jerez, Spanish football goalkeeper
- Manu (footballer born 1979), Antonio Manuel Sánchez Gómez, Spanish football midfielder
- Manú (footballer) (1982–2026), Emanuel Jesus Bonfim Evaristo, Portuguese football winger
- Manu (footballer, born 1984), José Manuel Rodríguez Morgade, Swiss football left-back
- Manu Silva, Manuel Jorge Silva, Portuguese football defensive midfielder for S.L. Benfica

== Sports teams ==
- Manu Samoa, the Samoa national rugby union team
- F.C. Manu Laeva, a Tuvaluan football club
  - Manu Laeva (women), Tuvaluan women's football club
- Manchester United F.C., an English football club

== Other uses ==
- 29353 Manu, a main-belt asteroid
- Manu (bird), a genus of prehistoric albatross-like birds from New Zealand
- Manu (film), a 2018 Indian Telugu-language film
- Manu (River City), a character on a BBC Scotland soap opera
- Manu (TV series), a 1991 French animated television series
- Tangata manu, the winner of a traditional competition of Easter Island
- An alternate name for the Ornithological Society of Polynesia
- A character in the 2000 French adult film Baise-moi
- Canadian real estate slang for a modular home
- An Akan name given to a second born child
- A manu, a New Zealand diving technique similar to the Cannonball (diving)

== See also ==
- Maanu (born 1978), Indian dancer and actress in Tamil films
- Maanu (actor) (died 1996), Indian actor in Kannada films
- Maanu Paul (1938–2022), New Zealand Māori leader
- Manus (disambiguation)
- Mannu (disambiguation)
