= Tee Tee Luce =

Burmese philanthropist (1895–1982)

- Born: Tee Tee; 19 July 1895; Insein, Hanthawaddy District, British Burma
- Died: 9 September 1982 (aged 87); Jersey
- Other name: Daw Tee Tee
- Occupation: Philanthropist
- Spouse: Gordon Luce (1915–1979, his death)
- Children: John Luce; Sandra Luce
- Relatives: Pe Maung Tin (brother)
- Awards: Ramon Magsaysay Award

Daw Tee Tee Luce was a Burmese philanthropist and wife of Gordon Luce, a Burma scholar. Tee Tee married Luce, a close friend of her brother Pe Maung Tin, also a Burma scholar, on 20 April 1915. She was a founding member of the Children's Aid and Protection Society. On 1 September 1928, Daw Tee Tee founded Home for Waifs and Strays, an orphanage and school for destitute boys on 114 Inya Road in Rangoon, on land owned by businessman U Ba Oh. The Home eventually served 6,000 boys and secured funding from UNESCO. She won the Ramon Magsaysay Award for public service in 1959. In 1964, soon after Ne Win's coup d'état, she and her husband were forced out of Burma. They settled in Jersey, in the Channel Islands.
