= Pauk =

Pauk may refer to:

== People ==
- Alex Pauk (born 1945), Canadian conductor and composer
- Goran Pauk (born 1962), Croatian politician
- György Pauk (1936-2024), Hungarian violinist
- Ke Pauk (1934–2002), Cambodian communist
- Paul Pauk (1912–1941), American football player
- Walter Pauk (died 2019), American professor and author

== Places ==
- Pauk, Myanmar, town in Pauk Township, Pakokku District, Magway Division, in northwest Burma (Myanmar)
- Pauk Township, township of Pakokku District in Magway Division of Burma (Myanmar)
- Pauk Airport (IATA: PAU, ICAO: VYPK), located in Burma near Pauk

== Other uses ==
- Pauk class corvette, the NATO reporting name for a class of small patrol corvettes built for the Soviet Navy between 1977 and 1989

== See also ==
- Kyar Pauk (fl. 21st c.), Burmese musician
- Maung Pauk Kyaing, Burmese legendary king
- Mogok Pauk Pauk (born 1977), Burmese fashion designer
