= Thamoddarit =

Thamoddarit သမုဒ္ဒရာဇ်

King of Pagan
- Reign: 107 – 152
- Predecessor: Founder
- Successor: Yathekyaung
- Born: 76 CE; Sri Ksetra
- Died: 152 (aged 76); Pagan (Bagan)
- Issue: Thiri Sanda Dewi
- House: Sri Ksetra

Thamoddarit (Burmese: သမုဒ္ဒရာဇ် pronounced [θəmoʊʔdəɹiʔ]; Pali: Samuddarāja; 76 – 152) was the legendary founder of Pagan Dynasty of Burma (Myanmar), who supposedly reigned from 107 to 152 CE. He was proclaimed as the founder of Pagan for the first time by Hmannan Yazawin, the Royal Chronicle of Konbaung Dynasty in 1832. The introduction of Thamoddarit, whose lineage Hmannan traces to the Sakya clan of the Buddha as the founder of Pagan, was part of the early Konbaung kings' efforts to move away from then prevailing pre-Buddhist origin narrative of the monarchy. Burmese chronicles down to the 18th century had traced to another legendary figure Pyusawhti, a descendant of a solar spirit and a dragon princess.

== Legend ==
=== Out of Sri Ksetra ===
According to Hmannan, Thamoddarit was a nephew of Thupyinnya, the last king of Sri Ksetra Kingdom. In 94 CE, a civil war broke out between the Pyu and the Kanyan, two of the three main ethnic groups of the kingdom. (The Mranma (Burmans) were the third.) The Pyu initially emerged victorious over the Kanyan. But the victors soon broke into three rival groups, and a second round of war ensued. Taking advantage of the confusion, a fourth group, the Mon of Lower Burma drove all indigenous groups out of Sri Ksetra.

=== Wandering years ===
Thamoddarit led one of the refugee groups out of Sri Ksetra, and wandered on along the Irrawaddy River for over a dozen years. They spent three years at Taungnyo near Sri Ksetra before they were driven out by the Mon. They spent another six years at Pantaung but the Kanyan drove them out. They then went to Mindon for another three years, and in 107 CE, finally stopped at the location of Pagan (Bagan). He incorporated nineteen villages in the area, and founded the city of Pagan. His dynasty became known as the Pagan Dynasty.

=== Reign ===
Thamoddarit had a long reign at Pagan. In the 22nd year of his reign, in 149 CE, a young man by the name of Pyusawhti became famous by performing daring feats. According to Hmannan, Pyusawhti was a descendant of the Second Tagaung Dynasty, ultimately from the first (mythical) Buddhist king of the world, Maha Sammata. But prior Burmese chronicles had identified him as a descendant of a solar spirit and a dragon princess. Thamoddarit married his daughter Thiri Sanda Dewi to Pyusawhti, and made him the heir apparent. He died three years later in 152 CE at the age of 76. Pyusawhti refused to take the throne; instead he gave the throne to his tutor Yathekyaung, who ruled until 167 CE.

== See also ==
- Tagaung Kingdom
- Sri Ksetra Kingdom
- Pagan Dynasty

== Notes ==
Thamoddarit Pagan Kingdom Born: 76 Died: 152
Regnal titles
Preceded by Founder	King of Pagan; 107 – 152	Succeeded by Yathekyaung
