= Yathekyaung =

Yathekyaung ရသေ့ကြောင်

King of Pagan
- Reign: 152 – 167 CE
- Predecessor: Thamoddarit
- Successor: Pyusawhti
- Born: 62
- Died: 167 (aged 105); Pagan (Bagan)

Yathekyaung (Burmese: ရသေ့ကြောင်, pronounced [jəθe̯ dʑàʊɰ̃]; also spelled Rathekyaung) was a semi-legendary king of Pagan Dynasty of Burma (Myanmar). According to 18th and 19th century Burmese chronicles Maha Yazawin and Hmannan Yazawin he was a monk and the tutor of Pyusawhti, who put him on the throne. He is not accepted as a king by some modern historians. (Note: (Harvey 1925: 364) does not recognize Thamoddarit or Yathekyaung, kings added by Maha Yazawin to link the Pagan royal lineage to the kings of Sri Ksetra Kingdom.)

== Notes ==
Yathekyaung Pagan Kingdom Born: 62 Died: 167 CE
Regnal titles
Preceded by Thamoddarit	King of Pagan; 152 – 167	Succeeded by Pyusawhti
