= Mannu (disambiguation) =

Mannu (English: The Soil) is a 1978 Malayalam film.

Mannu may also refer to:

- Mánnu (English: The Moon), a 1999 album by the Finnish folk music group Angelit
- Vilda Mánnu, the second album by Finnish band Eternal Tears of Sorrow
- Mannu Bhandari (born 1931), Indian author, wrote Hindi novels, Aapka Banti and Mahabhoj
- Capo Mannu, promontory in Sardinia, Italy
- Flumini Mannu, river in southern Sardinia, Italy

== See also ==
- Manu (disambiguation)
