= Maung Pauk Kyaing =

Historical king of Tagaung

Thado Maha Raja (သတိုးမဟာရာဇာ)
- Shambhu (a teknonymic name)
- Born: Maung Pauk Kyaing
- Spouse: Vācaṇṇī
- Issue: Maha Thambawa; Sula Thambanwa
- House: Second Tagaung Dynasty

Maung Pauk Kyaing ( maung-pauk-JYE-ng ,Burmese: မောင်ပေါက်ကျိုင်း, romanized: maungpaukkyuing:, Burmese pronunciation: [màʊɴ paʊʔ tɕáɪɴ]), also known as Naga-Naing Minn (Burmese: နဂါးနိုင်မင်း; lit. 'King who conquered the dragon'), was a legendary powerful king of Tagaung. He is a subject of Burmese folklore and ancient tales closely related to those of Sri Ksetra and the Beikthano cities. He is also said to be the last king of the second Tagaung dynasty. Maung Pauk Kyaing was a commoner who became king after killing a draconic serpent.

== Names ==
He is most famous in Burma by his common birth name 'Pauk Kyaing' (ပေါက်ကျိုင်း). His popular title 'Naga-Naing Minn' (နဂါးနိုင်မင်း) can be rendered as 'the dragon slayer king', reflecting on his victory over the dragon. His latest name Shambhu (သမ္ဘု, Pali: Sambhu, meaning 'Progenitor' ), is a teknonym related to his twin sons, the Sambava brothers, while also indicating that he is the ancestor of the main Burmese dynasties.

As for his regnal title, ''Thado Maha-Raja'' (သတိုးမဟာရာဇာ, lit. 'Valorous the Great') was the title given during his reign. Some identify him with the ninth king of the second Tagaung dynasty, ''Thado Naga-Naing'' (သတိုးနဂါးနိုင်, lit. 'Valorous the dragon conqueror'), but this theory lacks legitimacy.

== Legends ==
The Legends of Maung Pauk Kyaing is an important piece of history in the mythical foundation of Myanmar and the Chronicle of Taguang.

Legend has it that the Tagaung Kingdom was looking for a new king to take over along with the Queen Vācaṇṇī (ဝါစဏ္ဏီ), who had a dragon for a lover. However, all of the new kings would die the night before coronation in unexplained circumstances.

One day, Maung Pauk Kyaing was elected as the new king after the end of his education under the teachers of Taxila. But he somehow discovered that the queen had been married to several kings, and every king had mysterious deaths in bed on the wedding night. On his wedding night, he did not sleep. Eventually, a dragon appeared, and he knew the dragon was the cause of the deaths of all the past kings. He then managed to kill the dragon and became the legend he is today.

He continued to be with Queen Vācaṇṇī, who later gave birth to twins. Both sons were born blind and were called Maha Thambawa (မဟာသမ္ဘ၀) and Sula Thambawa (စူဠသမ္ဘ၀). The king sought treatment for his sons from various doctors until they become adults, but there was no cure. The king grew ashamed of his blind sons and ordered the queen to put them to death in secret. The queen could not kill the sons out of sympathy and decided to adrift them off on a raft down the Ayeyarwady River.

The two blind princes were found by a yakshini who healed their sights. The brothers then resided at Pyay (Prome) and later found the Kingdom of Sri Ksetra.

== Legacy ==
The history of Maung Pauk Kyaing is well-described in Myanmar's former 10th-grade history book by the Ministry of Education.

There is a Buddhist temple called Pauk Kyaing Pagoda in Tagaung, Mandalay. Many believe that this temple was built by Maung Pauk Kyaing himself.
