= Manu the Great =

Chaldean god who "presided over fate"

Manu the Great was a Chaldean god who "presided over fate".

He is referred to as one of the dii minores, or minor deities, of ancient Chaldea by Lenormant in his 1875 work, Chaldean Magic:

Popular worship only gave them a distinct existence, and, in the general and scientific system of religion, they were considered as diverse forms of the same divinity. But some of the dii minores have a right to be considered distinct personages, as they perform functions of a certain importance.

Henry George Tomkins, an Exeter clergyman and member of the Royal Archaeological Society, saw Manu as a possible link to the "sons of Anak", mentioned in the Old Testament:

Prof. Sayce tells me he has found "Akhamanu" in a contract tablet of the reign of Zabum before the time of Abraham; and among the kings of a contemporary dynasty with that of Khammurabi, the fifth out of eleven is Shusshi ששי which is equivalent to "Sheshai" (Josh. 15. 13, 14) in the paper referred to in note 11 above, I suggested that the second element in Akhi-man might be "Manu the Great" of the Babylonians, the god of fate

He is also listed in Gustav Davidson's A Dictionary of Angels. Both Tomkins and Davidson cite only Lenormant for their reference to Manu the Great.
