= Pe Maung Tin =

Burmese scholar and educator

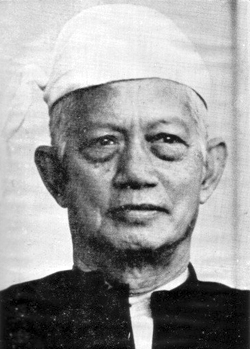
- Born: Ba Tin; 24 April 1888; Pauktaw, Insein Township, Hanthawaddy District, British Burma
- Died: 22 March 1973 (aged 84)
- Education: University of Calcutta (M. A., 1911); Rangoon College (B. A., 1909) LL.S Rangoon University, University of Oxford, Exeter college (B.Litt)
- Occupations: Pali scholar and educator
- Spouse: Edith Kyi Kyi
- Children: Brenda Tin Tin Myaing
- Relatives: Tee Tee Luce (sister)

Pe Maung Tin (Burmese: ဖေမောင်တင် [pʰè màʊɰ̃ tɪ̀ɰ̃]; 24 April 1888 – 22 March 1973) was a scholar of Pali and Buddhism and educator in Myanmar, formerly Burma. Born to an Anglican family at Pauktaw, Insein Township, Rangoon, he was the fifth child of U Pe and Daw Myaing. His grandfather was the first Burmese pastor of Henzada. He learnt the basic Buddhist texts at a local private school before he went to Rangoon Government High School where he won a scholarship at age 14.

== Distinguished career ==
He graduated with a B. A. degree from University College, Rangoon in 1909 and an M. A. degree from the University of Calcutta in 1911. Pe Maung Tin became the first national professor of Pali language at University College, Rangoon, and also, at the age of 24, the youngest professor in Burma in 1912. The position came with the post of librarian of Bernard Free Library and the job of Honorary Secretary of the Burma Research Society as well as editor of its journal JBRS. He was called "M.A. Maung Tin" or "Pali Maung Tin" because of his knowledge of Buddhism. He obtained his Bachelor of Letters (B. Litt.) degree from Oxford University in 1922. He had also visited Paris for further studies (1920–21), and was invited back to lecture on Asian literature in 1936.

Pe Maung Tin was the only Burmese to be appointed to the commission set up in 1918 to establish Rangoon University independent of Calcutta. He then worked hard to raise the status of Burmese literature as an Honours degree subject. He himself brought out texts to teach. The first course was taught in 1924, and the first student was Sein Tin who graduated in 1927 and later became famous under the pen name Theippan Maung Wa as one of the pioneers of the Hkit San literary movement.

He was close friends with professors J S Furnivall of the BRS and Gordon H Luce, who married his sister Tee Tee in 1915. He contributed to various language debates held by the Society (1922–1925). The year 1934 saw the publication of Hkit san pon byin (ခေတ်ဆန်းပုံပြင်, Experimental Tales), a collection of short stories in a new style of writing, by his students Theippan Maung Wa, Zawgyi and Min Thu Wun, followed by an anthology called Hkit san kabya (ခေတ်ဆန်းကဗျာ, Experimental Poems). Professor Pe Maung Tin explained in his foreword that he coined the word hkit san (ခေတ်ဆန်း, testing the times) as he wanted his students to experiment and test the reaction of the readers. He was also an accomplished musician and had helped sponsor the Rangoon College Philharmonic Society.

Pe Maung Tin became principal of University College, Rangoon University, in 1937. In 1939 he was elected president of the Burma Research Society. After the Second World War in 1946, he retired at age 58. He was however asked to serve as principal of the University of Adult Education in 1947. He then became chairman of the University Translation and Publication Advisory Board and professor emeritus of Pali the following year. He was re-elected president of the BRS in 1950, and awarded an honorary doctorate LL. D. by Rangoon University in 1952.

In 1957-58 Pe Maung Tin visited the United States of America to lecture on Buddhism at the University of Chicago which awarded him an honorary doctorate. He was also invited to speak at Bucknell University, Pennsylvania. In May 1959 he attended the East Asia Christian Conference meeting in Kuala Lumpur, and later went to China as a member of a cultural exchange delegation.

From 1960 to 1964, Pe Maung Tin served as chairman of the Burma Historical Commission. He led the Burma Translation Society in compiling the Burmese Encyclopedia. In 1968 the BRS marked his 80th birthday with a special celebration. The Pali Text Society in 1972 requested him to become their editor for the 50 volume publication of the Atthakatha, the year before he died in 1973 at age 85.

Many did not realize that he was a Christian and thought he was a former Buddhist monk because of his knowledge of Buddhism. He was a leader of the Christian Literature Society of the Burma Council of Churches. A popular story was that some of his students asked him to become a Buddhist because of his familiarity with the religion and the similarity of his thoughts with Buddhist philosophy. Pe Maung Tin reportedly told them that it had been a long time that he was a Christian, and at his age, he did not want to abandon his 'old wife' for a new one.

== Publications ==
The first of his numerous articles and reviews to appear in the JBRS, in 1911, was titled Missionary Burmese which acknowledged the achievements of the American Baptist lexicographer and missionary Adoniram Judson (1788–1849) and exhorted the contemporary missionaries to study the best of Burmese literature so their sermons could be more effective. Another early publication was titled Notes on Dipavamsa, a Buddhist text, in 1912.

He was also professor of Oriental studies and was honored by the Pali Text Society for his translation of the Visuddhimagga, an encyclopedia of the dhamma written by Buddhaghosa, into English. It was for this work that he had received the B. Litt. from Oxford. His first translation work for the PTS, started in 1916, was The Expositor (Atthasalini): Buddhaghosa's Commentary on Dhammasangani The First Book of the Abhidhamma Pitaka published by the Oxford University Press in 1920-21. He co-authored, whilst in London with Lilias E. Armstrong, a Burmese phonetic reader in 1925.

Pe Maung Tin was a prodigious writer, and his works, such as a Burmese grammar (1951–1955), selections of Burmese prose, a history of Burmese literature (1938), and the Visuddhimagga, are still used as references. Pe Maung Tin with Gordon Luce translated the Glass Palace Chronicle. It was the first time he signed the name Pe Maung Tin to the introduction dated 1 November 1922. The year 1928 saw the publication of Selections from the Inscriptions of Pagan compiled with Luce.

He also edited Kinwun Mingyi U Kaung's London and Paris Diaries (1927–28) among several works for the Burma Education Extension Association (BEEA) founded by Furnivall after he retired.

== Family ==
Pe Maung Tin married at the age of 40 to Edith Kyi Kyi, daughter of U Po Dan and Daw Mya Gyi and 13 years his junior, on 9 June 1928, at an Anglican church in Thayarwady. Their youngest daughter Tin Tin Myaing (Brenda), a scholar of French language and literature and librarian, lives in London. She is on the council of the Britain Burma Society She organised a symposium on her celebrated father's 110th anniversary in 1998 at the School of Oriental and African Studies in London. His centenary was overshadowed by the momentous events in Burma in 1988.

== Bibliography ==
- Aung-Thwin, Michael (2005). The mists of Rāmañña: The Legend that was Lower Burma (illustrated ed.). Honolulu: University of Hawai'i Press. ISBN 9780824828868.
- Pe, Maung Tin (1975). The path of purity: being a translation of Buddhaghosa's Visuddhimagga. London: Pali Text Society. ISBN 0-7100-8218-5.
