= Tagaung Kingdom =

Former Asian city-state in present-day Myanmar

Coordinates: 23°29′55″N 96°00′40″E

Kingdom of Tagaung တကောင်း နေပြည်တော်
- c. 850 BCE–c. 1055
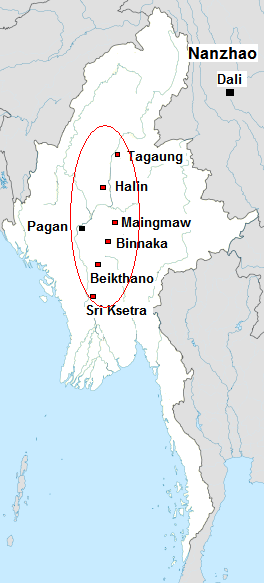
- Capital: Tagaung
- Common languages: Pyu, Burmese
- Religion: Buddhism, animism, Hinduism
- Government: Monarchy
- Historical era: Classical Antiquity
  - Founding of Kingdom: c. 850 BCE
  - Fall of Kingdom: c. 1055
Succeeded by
Pagan Kingdom

Tagaung Kingdom (Burmese: တကောင်း နေပြည်တော်, pronounced [dəɡáʊɰ̃ nèpjìdɔ̀]) was a Pyu city-state that existed in the first millennium CE. In 1832, the hitherto semi-legendary state was officially proclaimed the first kingdom of Burmese monarchy by Hmannan Yazawin, the Royal Chronicle of the Konbaung dynasty. Hmannan adds that the "kingdom" was founded by Abhiyaza of the Sakya clan of the Buddha in 850 BCE, and that through Abiyaza, Burmese monarchs traced their lineage to the Buddha and the first Buddhist (mythical) king of the world Maha Sammata. Hmannan also introduces another Sakya prince Dazayaza who founded the second Tagaung dynasty c. 600 CE. The narrative superseded then prevailing pre-Buddhist origin story in which the monarchy was founded by a descendant of a solar spirit and a dragon princess.

Archaeological evidence indicates that Neolithic and Bronze Age cultures existed at Tagaung, and a city-state founded by the Pyu emerged in the early centuries CE. The chronicles, which likely represent the social memory of the times, repeatedly mention multiple competing groups and migrations that Tagaung and the entire Pyu realm experienced in the first millennium CE. The city-state became part of the Pagan Empire in the 1055.

== Etymology ==
According to Kadu history, the name Tagaung stems from "leg step-on". Which literally means the "stepping place". Today this term is used to refer to a place belonging to someone.

== Legend ==
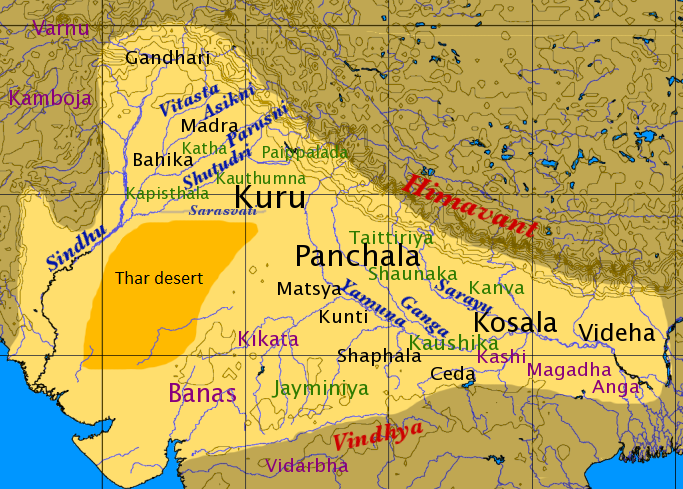
Map of northern India in the late Vedic period. The location of Vedic shakhas is labelled in green.

=== Out of India ===
Tagaung came to be featured prominently in an effort by the early Konbaung kings to link the origins of Burmese monarchy to the Buddha, and ultimately the first king of the world in Buddhist mythology, Maha Sammata. Hmannan states that Prince Abhiyaza (Abhiraja) (အဘိရာဇာ) of Kingdom of Kosala (ကောသလ) of the Sakya clan (သကျ သာကီဝင် မင်းမျိုး)—the clan of the Buddha and Maha Sammata—and his followers left their homeland, following a military defeat against their neighbouring Kingdom of Panchala (ပဉ္စာလရာဇ်). They settled and founded a kingdom at Tagaung in present-day northern Burma at the upper banks of the Irrawaddy River in 850 BCE.

=== First Tagaung dynasty ===
Hmannan does not claim that Abhiyaza had arrived in an empty land, only that he was the first king. He had two sons, and died after a 25-year reign at Tagaung. The elder son Kanyaza Gyi (ကံရာဇာကြီး) lost the throne to his younger brother Kanyaza Nge (ကံရာဇာငယ်). Kanyaza Gyi ventured south, and founded his own kingdom at Arakan in 825 BCE. Kanyaza Nge succeeded his father, and was followed by a dynasty of 31 kings. Circa 600 BCE, Taruk marauders from Gandhara (ဂန္ဓာလရာဇ်) sacked the city. (The invaders were from Yunnan. Taruk refers to the Mongo Tartar in modern Burmese but in Old Burmese, it referred to anyone from the northeast. Gandhara was the classical name of Yunnan adopted by the Buddhist kingdoms there.) The 33rd king of Abhiyaza line, King Binnaka Yaza (ဘိန္နကရာဇာ) was killed.

=== Second Tagaung dynasty ===
Hmannan continues that the fall of Tagaung led to tripartite division of the population. One group moved down and settled at Thunapayanta which was then inhabited by Pyus, Kanyans and Thets. Another group went southeast, and founded what would later be known as the 19 districts of Kyaukse. They became known as the Binnaka line. (Thunapayanta was located near present-day Pagan (Bagan), and the primary Pyu city-state in Kyaukse was Maingmaw.) A third group led by Naga Hsein (နာဂဆိန်), the queen of Binnaka Yaza, remained at Tagaung.

The queen then met Dazayaza (Dhajaraja), of royal Sakya lineage who had recently settled in Mauriya (somewhere in Upper Burma). She married him. Dazayaza and Naga Hsein built a new capital at Old Pagan, close to Tagaung. A dynasty of 16 kings followed. Some time after 483 BCE, invaders from the east sacked the kingdom during the reign of Thado Maha Yaza, the 17th and last king.

=== Tagaung legacy and linkage to later Burmese dynasties ===
But the Sakya lineage had not died out, Hmannan continues. In 503 BCE, the queen of the last king of Tagaung, Thado Maha Yaza gave birth to twin blind sons, Maha Thanbawa and Sula Thanbawa. The king was ashamed, and ordered them killed. The queen hid her sons, and raised them in secret. Nineteen years later, in 484 BCE, the king found out that the brothers were still alive, and again ordered them killed. The queen managed to put the sons on a raft down the Irrawaddy. Adrift in the river, the brothers miraculously gained sight with the help of the ogress.

In 483 BCE, the brothers founded another kingdom much farther down the Irrawaddy at Sri Ksetra, near modern Pyay (Prome). Maha Thanbawa was the first king and ruled for six years. He was followed by Sula Thanbawa, ruling for 35 years. He was followed by King Duttabaung, son of Maha Thanbawa. Duttabaung ruled for 70 years. In all, Sri Ksetra lasted nearly six centuries.

Around 107 CE, Thamoddarit (သမုဒ္ဒရာဇ်), nephew of the last king of Sri Ksetra, founded the city of Pagan (Bagan) (formally, Arimaddana-pura (အရိမဒ္ဒနာပူရ), lit. "the City that Tramples on Enemies"). The site reportedly was visited by the Buddha himself during his lifetime, and it was where he allegedly pronounced that a great kingdom would arise at this very location 651 years after his death. Thamoddarit was followed by a caretaker, and then Pyusawhti in 167 CE. The connection to the Pagan dynasty was important because all later Burmese dynasties, Myinsaing to Konbaung claimed lineage to the monarchs of Pagan.

=== Historicity ===
The Abhiyaza story first appeared in Hmannan Yazawin (the Glass Palace Chronicle), compiled in 1832. The Burmese chronicles down to the early 18th century, including Maha Yazawin (the Great Chronicle) written in 1724, upon which Hmannan is heavily based, do not mention Abhiyaza. Instead, the pre-Hmannan origin story of the Burmese monarchy speaks of one Pyusawhti, son a solar spirit and a dragon princess, who later founded the Pagan dynasty. Moreover, the Abhiyaza/Dazayaza stories were layered upon the oral histories/legends of Tagaung and Sri Ksetra.

Historians trace the rise of Abhiyaza/Dazayaza stories to the 1770s, part of the early Konbaung kings' efforts to promote a more orthodox version of Theravada Buddhism. The trend gained ground under King Bodawpaya (r. 1782–1819) who, like his father Alaungpaya, believed that he was the next Buddha, Maitreya. Though the king would later reluctantly gave up his claim and acceded to his late father's claim, his purification drive devalued "local sources of sanctity" in favour of "universal textual forms endorsed by the crown and the monkhood", and "outlawed animal sacrifices atop Mt. Popa and other sacred sites while female and transvestite shamans lost status." In the reign of his successor Bagyidaw in 1832, the pre-Buddhist origin story of Pyusawhti was officially superseded with the Abhiyaza story's "claims of royal descent from the clan of Gotama Buddha and thence the first Buddhist king of the world, Maha Sammata".

The Chinese history book Yuanshi also recorded the name "Tagaung"(太公). But it just a small town in north Burma. Chinese historian stated the name "Taruk" is evolved from Turk, thus the Chinese invasion happened in 13 century known as First Mongol invasion of Burma. G. E. Harvey said that it was probably Nanzhao's invasion in 754 AD. Anyway, Hmannan Yazawin move it up to 6 BCE and became the history of Tagaung.

The late inclusion of Abhiyaza/Dazayaza stories did much damage to the credibility of the chronicles to the European historians of the British colonial era. They outright dismissed much of the chronicle tradition of early Burmese history as "copies of Indian legends taken from Sanskrit or Pali originals", highly doubted the antiquity of the chronicle tradition, and dismissed the possibility that any sort of civilisation in Burma could be much older than 500 CE.

== History ==
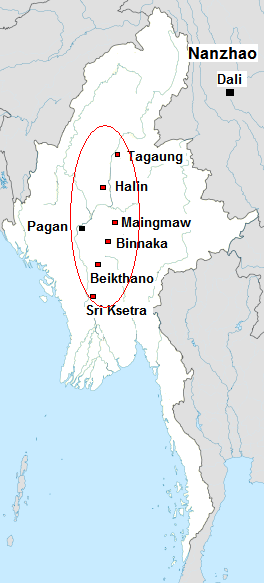
Pyu city-states circa 8th century

The Abhiyaza myth notwithstanding, evidence does indicate that many of the places mentioned in the royal records have indeed been inhabited continuously for at least 3500 years. Neolithic and Bronze Age artefacts discovered at Kyan Hnyat (30 km south of Tagaung) confirm human habitation at Tagaung in the same era (1st millennium BCE) of both Tagaung dynasties reported in pre-Hmannan chronicles. To be sure, evidence of human habitation is not the same as that of a city-state. Extant evidence indicates that Tagaung emerged as a city-state (a triple-walled emerged as a city-state site on the east bank of the Irrawaddy) only in the "early centuries CE". (However, Tagaung has not been extensively excavated, and earlier evidence may yet emerge. Aside from Sri Ksetra and Beikthano, the rest of the Pyu sites have not been extensively excavated.) Moreover, the states of Tagaung, Sri Ksetra and Pagan all existed in the order, though not in the discrete fashion reported in the chronicles. They were contemporary to each other for long periods.

State	Period per Hmannan	Per extant archaeological evidence	Notes
Tagaung	850 – 483 BCE	c. 1st/2nd century – 11th century CE	After 483 BCE, Tagaung next appeared in the chronicles in 1061 CE, and in 1364 CE as cursory mentions.
Sri Ksetra	483 BCE – 94 CE	c. 5th/7th century – 11th century CE	Sri Ksetra then became modern Pyay (Prome)
Pagan	107 – 1298 CE	c. 849/876 – 1297 CE	

The chronicles' pre-Buddhist stories represent the "social memory" of the times. The "Pyu realm" was inhabited by different ethnic groups such as Thet Kadu (Sak Kantu), Kyan (Chin), Tircul (mainline Pyu). And the times were in flux evidenced by the repeated mentions in the chronicles of ruptures and movement of groups to different regions. Tagaung existed as a city-state until the early 11th century when it, according to G.H. Luce, was the "eastern capital" of the Kadu people. But Htin Aung disagrees with Luce's "theory", pointing out that there is no evidence to warrant the assertion. At any rate, the city-state then was conquered by the Pagan Empire in the mid-1050s. It was one of the 43 forts established by King Anawrahta in 1061.

== See also ==
- Early Pagan Kingdom
- Sri Ksetra Kingdom
