= Asia, Pacific and Africa Collections, British Library =

Collections within the British Library

Coordinates: 51.5303°N 0.1275°W

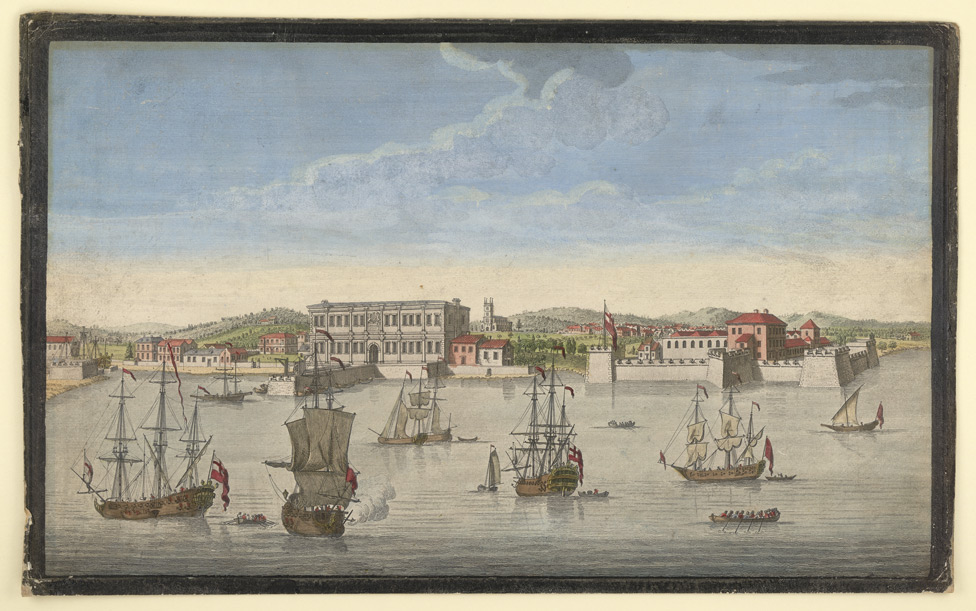
Bombay on the Malabar Coast belonging to the East India Company of England by Jan van Ryne (1754) is in the India Office Records.

The Asia, Pacific and Africa Collections previously called the Oriental and India Office Collections (OIOC) form a significant part of the holdings of the British Library in London, England.

== India Office collection ==
The collections include the documents from the India Office Library and Records, relating to the entire history of British involvement in India and other parts of the eastern world, as well as materials in the languages of Asia-Pacific and of north and north-east Africa. It was located at Orbit House, 197 Blackfriars Road, London. Also, until 1998, The Department of Oriental Manuscripts and Printed Books was located at 14, Store Street, off Tottenham Court Road, London. Orbit House was demolished in 2004.

The collections also include transcriptions of baptism, marriage, and burial records of Christians of European descent, sent to Britain from India during the period of British rule, which are a vital resource in researching the genealogy of Anglo-Indians or domiciled Europeans who lived there.
