= Gordon Luce =

British orientalist (1889–1979)

Gordon H. Luce
- Born: Gordon Hannington Luce; 20 January 1889; Gloucester, England
- Died: 3 May 1979 (aged 90); Jersey
- Other name: G.H. Luce
- Education: Emmanuel College, Cambridge; Dean Close School
- Occupation: Burma scholar
- Spouse: Tee Tee Luce (m. 1915)
- Children: John Luce; Sandra Luce

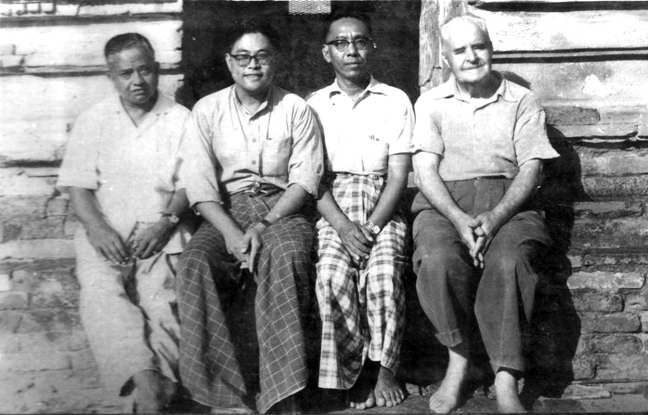
From left to right: Bohmu Ba Shin, U Bo Kay, Min Thu Wun, and Gordon H. Luce

Gordon Hannington Luce (20 January 1889 – 3 May 1979) was a colonial scholar in Burma. His outstanding library containing books, manuscripts, maps and photographs – The Luce Collection – was acquired by the National Library of Australia in 1980, as part of its major research collections on Asia.

== Biography ==
Luce was the twelfth of thirteen children of the Rev. John James Luce, Vicar of St Nicholas's, Gloucester. He was educated at Dean Close School, Cheltenham, from where he gained a classical scholarship to Emmanuel College, Cambridge, and in 1911, obtained a first-class degree in Classics. During his Cambridge years, he was a member of the Cambridge Apostles and his circle of friends included Arthur Waley, giving him admission to the friendship of such contemporaries as Rupert Brooke, Aldous Huxley, and John Maynard Keynes and other members of the Bloomsbury Group.

In 1912 Luce was appointed Lecturer in English Literature at Government College, Rangoon, later a constituent college of the University of Rangoon. There he developed a lasting friendship with the young Pali scholar Pe Maung Tin. In 1915, he married Pe Maung Tin's sister Ma Tee Tee.

Luce's studies of Burmese culture resulted in articles contributed to the Journal of the Burma Research Society. He was a prolific author throughout his life and wrote books and articles on a wide variety of subjects relating particularly to Burma's history and languages such as Chinese Invasions of Burma in the 18th Century, Inscriptions of Burma, The Economic Life of the Early Burman, and An Introduction to the Comparative Study of Karen Languages. His three-volume Old Burma: early Pagan, covers the history, art and architecture of Burma and its capital city Pagan in the 11th and 12th centuries. Phases of Pre-Pagan Burma, on the earlier history of Burma, appeared posthumously. His writings remain authoritative today and are widely cited.

During the Japanese invasion in 1942 Luce and his wife escaped into India. He returned to Rangoon after the war and remained there until 1964, when, like other foreigners, he was forced to leave the country. His final fifteen years were spent on Jersey. The high esteem in which he was held by Burmese and Western scholars is reflected in the publication of the two-volume work, Essays to G. H. Luce by his colleagues and friends in honour of his seventy-fifth birthday, which appeared in 1966.

== The Luce Collection ==
The Luce manuscripts cover a wide variety of materials. They are stored at the National Library of Australia in 32 boxes and 22 folios. A broad listing is available. Ten boxes contain general correspondence. There are over two thousand books in the Luce Collection. While the main focus is on Burma, the collection contains materials on the history, languages and cultures of Southeast Asia. All titles have been catalogued onto the NLA's Australian National Bibliographic Database.

The Buddhist Digital Resource Center hosts online an additional set of unpublished notebooks and portfolio's of Luce, which include his transcriptions of Burmese inscriptions. The originals are held at SOAS University of London.

== Siam Society collection ==
The Siam Society under Royal Protection in conjunction with the Siamese Heritage Protection Program has made the Journal of the Siam Society (JSS) in PDF format available to all; the collection includes these by Luce, Gordon H.

- JSS Vol. 46.2b (1958) The Early Syam in Burma's History
- JSS Vol. 47.1c (1959) The Early Syam in Burma's History Supplement
- JSS Vol. 53.1c (1965) Dvaravati and Old Burma
- JSS Vol. 53.2c (1965) Rice and Religion
