= Mahāsammata =

- Reign: Mahasammata
- Successor: Roja (Roca)
- Consort: Manikpala
- Religion: Buddhism

Mahāsammata (මහා සම්මත); also spelled Maha Samrat; lit. "the Great Elect"), also known as first Khattiya and Rāja, was the first farmer monarch of the world according to Buddhist tradition. He is also identified as Manu, the first post-deluge king. The chronicles of Theravada Buddhist tradition such as Mahāvaṃsa and Maha Yazawin states that he was the founder of the Maha Sammatha Manu dynasty, to which the historical Buddha belonged. According to the Agganna Sutta, he was a rice farmer who was elected by the other farmers to rule them as per Dhamma. He was the first of the eleven world monarchs called Maha Sammata, each of whom founded the eleven dynasties that existed from the beginning to the day of the Buddha. The Burmese Thervada text The Great Chronicle of Buddhas mentioned that Mahasammata Raja was the founder Surya Vansha Kshatriya. His another name was Manu or Sun because his personality was similar to the sun. Pali canon described that Bodhisattva Sidatha Gotama claimed his ancestry from Mahasammata Raja, Addicca naman gotten, name jathiya, meaning in clan of Adicca and house of Shakyans.

== Brief ==
The future king was born "in the beginning of the world" in Jambudvīpa, the only habitable continent on earth, to a family descended from the solar race. As no leaders or political orders were in existence, the people elected him to be their king. He ascended to the throne with the title Mahāsammata ("the Great Elect", He Who is designated by people), and took Manikpala as his queen. As king, he constituted the order of the city-state, the various duties and offices defined for the state, and the boundaries of armies of their protection. He also compiled the first dhammasattha (law treatise).

According to the Mahāvaṃsa Ṭīkā (sub-commentaries), Mahāsammata was the bodhisatwa in a previous life. The Jātaka commentary identifies the primeval king Mahā-Mandhāta as being the bodhisatta as well, Mahāmandhata being the great-great-great-great grandson of Mahāsammata. Mahāmandhātā is given as an example of one who could obtain great sense-pleasure (and even to the glory of the gods) in his lifetime, but still had to die. The Cetiya Jātaka states that the lifespan of Mahāsammata was an asankheyya long (literally, "cannot be calculated").

== Aftermath ==
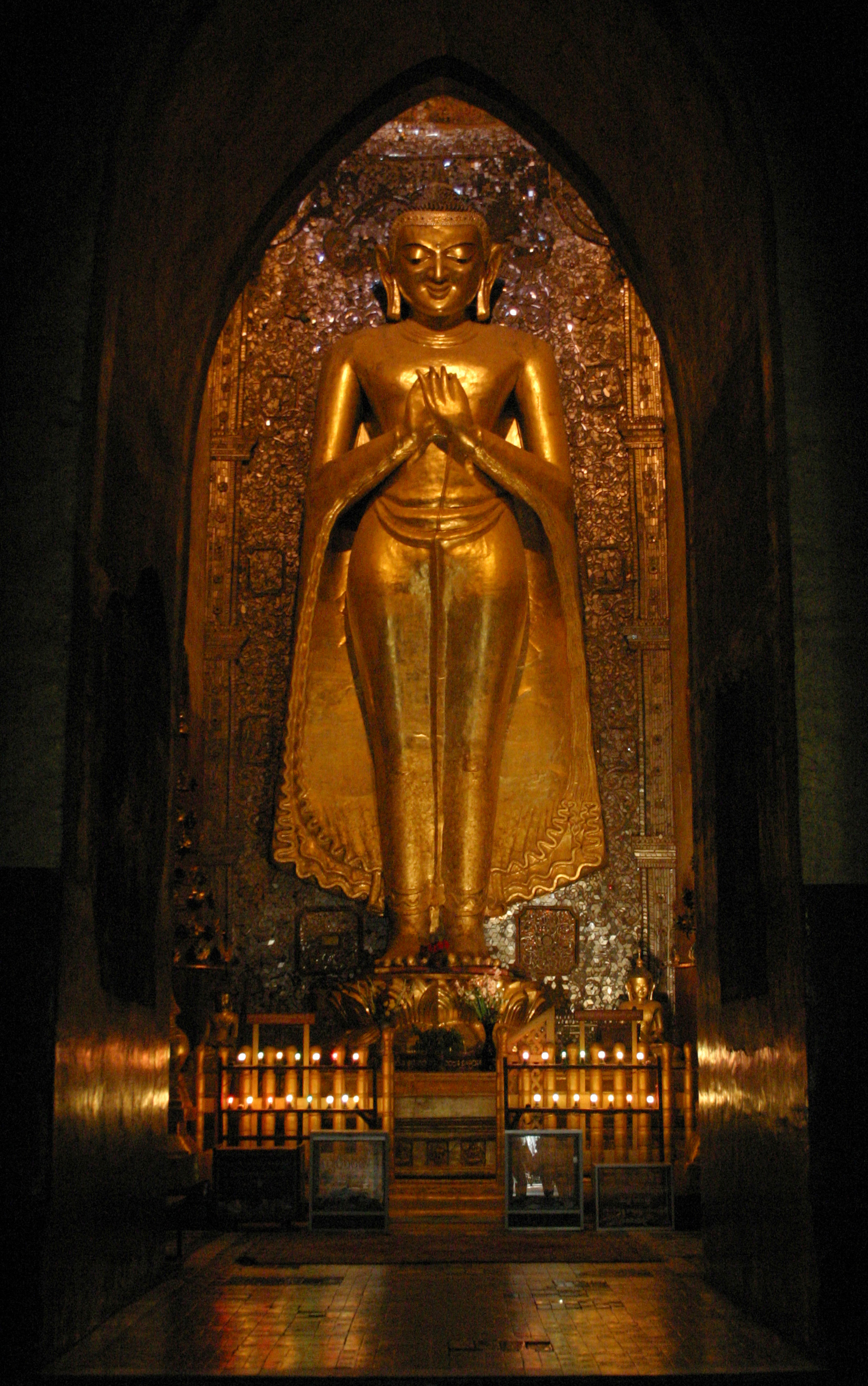
Ananda Temple's Kassapa Buddha – South facing

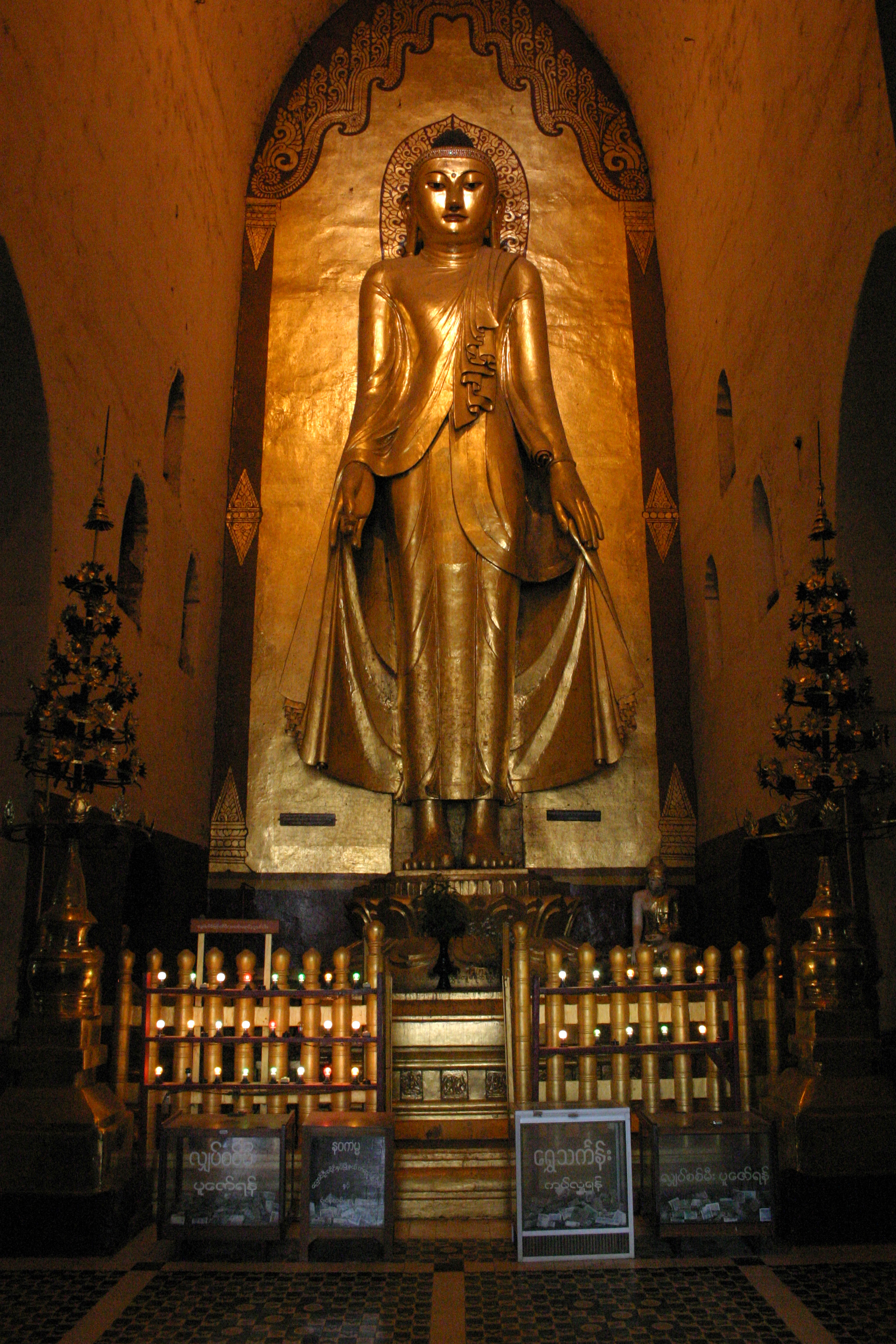
Kakusandha Buddha – North facing

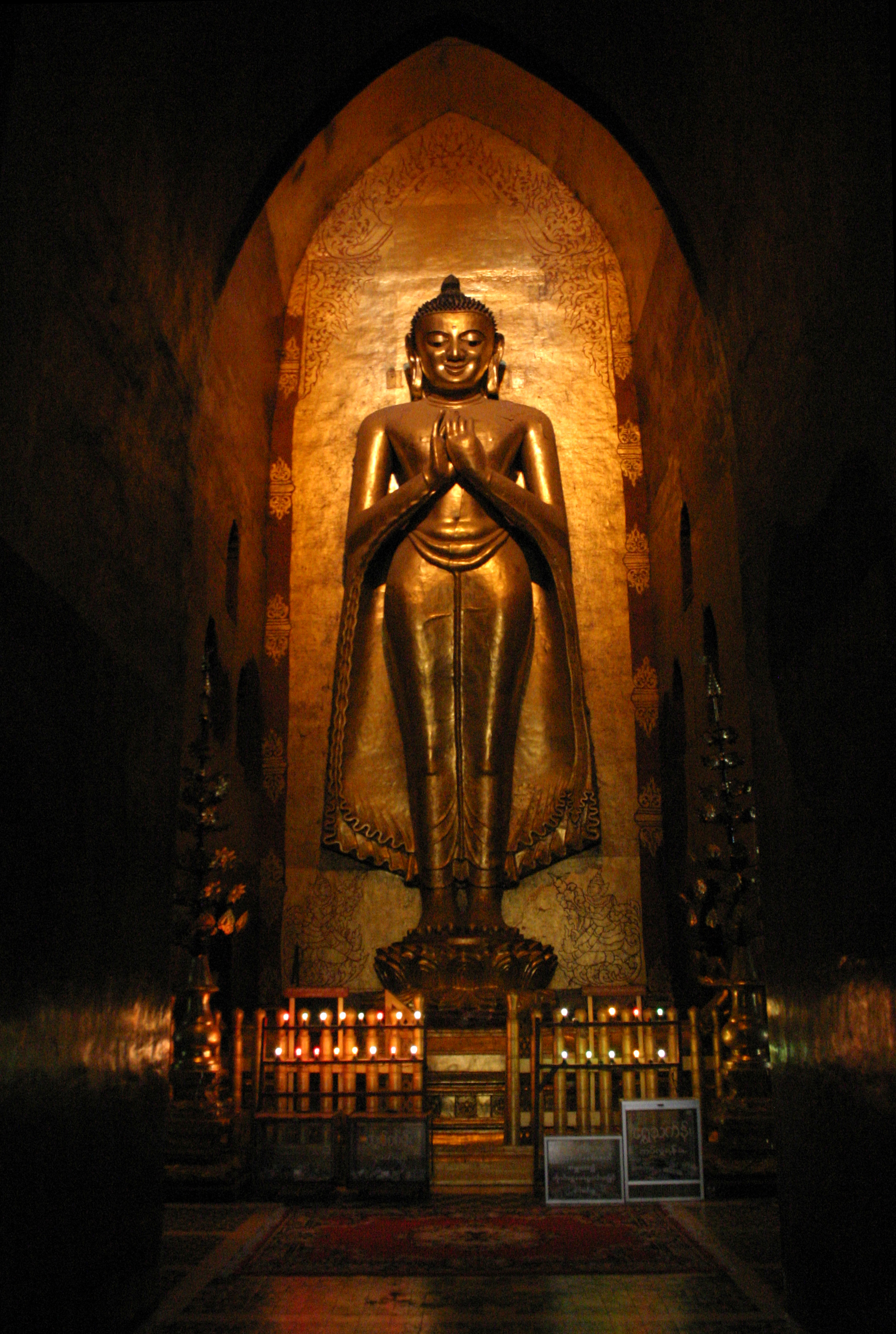
Koṇāgamana Buddha – East facing

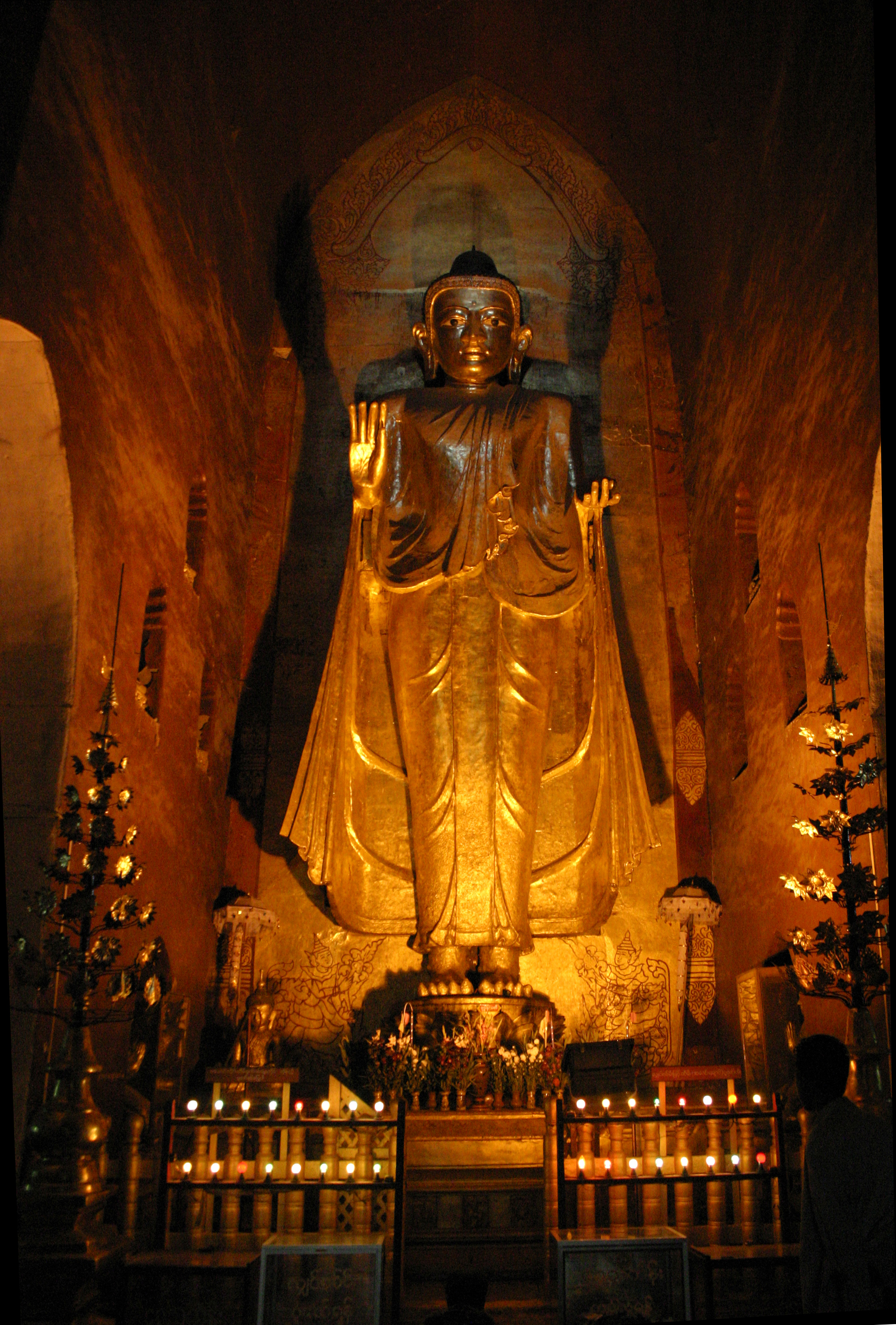
Gothama Buddha – West facing

The dynasty he founded was to have a line of 63,000 kings. That dynasty eventually fell because people forgot religion (dharma). The second dynasty was founded by the founder who took the title Mahāsammata II. That dynasty too eventually fell after another 63,000 kings later. The fall of the second dynasty was followed by the foundation of the third dynasty. The cycle of rising and falling dynasties continued to the day of the historical Buddha, over 2500 years ago.

According to Theravada tradition, a total of 28 Buddhas have appeared including the historical Buddha. The first 24 Buddhas appeared in the first seven cycles. The last four Buddhas appeared in the most recent four cycles.

Name	Era
Kakusandha Buddha	Eighth Mahāsammata Dynasty
Koṇāgamana Buddha	Ninth Mahāsammata Dynasty
Kassapa Buddha	Tenth Mahāsammata Dynasty
Gautama Buddha	Eleventh Mahāsammata Dynasty

== Significance ==
Maha Sammata is mentioned in various Buddhist traditions. In addition to the Theravada accounts, Tibetan and Mongolian Buddhist schools describe him as the founder of political thought.

== See also ==
- Buddhist cosmology
- Buddhist mythology
- Burmese chronicles
- Buddhist kingship
- Sinhalese chronicles

== Bibliography ==
- Heissig, Walther (1980). The Religions of Mongolia. University of California Press. ISBN 978-0-520-03857-8.
- Kala, U (1724). Maha Yazawin Gyi (in Burmese). Vol. 1–3 (2006, 4th printing ed.). Yangon: Ya-Pyei Publishing.
- Kapferer, Bruce (1997). The Feast of the Sorcerer: Practices of Consciousness and Power (illustrated ed.). University of Chicago Press. ISBN 978-0-226-42411-8.
- Kapferer, Bruce (2002). Beyond Rationalism: Rethinking Magic, Witchcraft, and Sorcery (illustrated ed.). Berghahn Books. ISBN 978-1-57181-418-0.
- Mahanama-sthavira, Thera (1999). Douglas Bullis (ed.). Mahavamsa: The Great Chronicle of Sri Lanka. Jain Publishing Company. ISBN 978-0-89581-906-2.
- Maha Thilawuntha, Shin (1928). Pe Maung Tin (ed.). Yazawin Kyaw (in Burmese) (4th printing, 2010 ed.). Yangon: Burma Research Society (original publisher), Ya-Pyei (4th printing).
- Rhys Davids, T.W. (2006). Dialogues of the Buddha. Vol. 3 (reprint ed.). Kessinger Publishing. ISBN 978-1-4286-3502-9.
- Maurya, Sudheer (2020). Manikpala Mahasammat. Aman Prakashan. ISBN 978-93-89220-81-0.
