= Glass Palace Chronicle =

English language translation of the first portions of Hmannan Yazawin

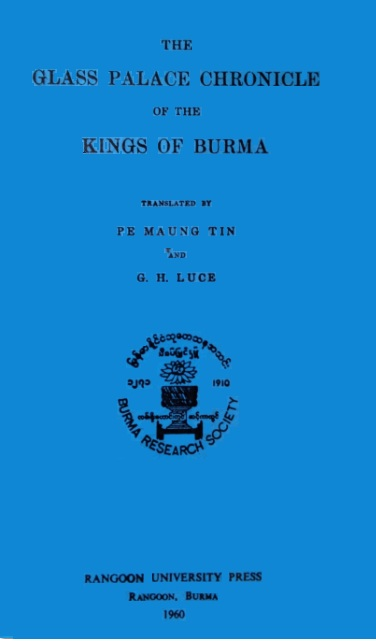
- Cover of second printing (1960)
- Author: Royal Historical Commission of Burma
- Original title: မှန်နန်း မဟာ ရာဇဝင်တော်ကြီး Hmannan Maha Yazawindawgyi
- Translator: Pe Maung Tin and G.H. Luce
- Language: English
- Series: Burmese chronicles
- Genre: Chronicle, History
- Publisher: Oxford University (1st printing); Rangoon University Press (2nd printing)
- Publication date: 1923, 1960
- Publication place: Burma
- Media type: Print
- Pages: 179

The Glass Palace Chronicle of the Kings of Burma is the only English language translation of the first portions of Hmannan Yazawin, the standard chronicle of the Konbaung dynasty of Burma (Myanmar). Hmannan was translated into English by Pe Maung Tin and Gordon H. Luce in 1923, who gave it its English name.

George Coedes cites the chronicle for a "very romanticized account of the events following the death of Alaungsithu."

== See also ==
- The Glass Palace
