= Tagaung =

Town in northern Myanmar

- Town
- Location in Myanmar
- Coordinates: 23°30′N 96°2′E
- Country: Myanmar
- Region: Mandalay
- District: Thabeikkyin District
- Township: Thabeikkyin Township

Population (2005)
  - Ethnicities: Bamar
  - Religions: Buddhism
- Time zone: UTC+6.30 (MMT)

Tagaung is a town in Thabeikkyin Township, Mandalay Region, Myanmar. It is situated on the east bank of the Ayeyarwady River, 127 miles north of Mandalay.

Colloquially, Tagaung is thought to be the origin of the Burmese people, remembered by the adage Myanmar asa Tagaung ga (Myanmar starts from Tagaung). It holds an important place in Burmese mythology through the founding myth of Burmese prehistory, written in the Tagaung Yazawin, as well as the capital of the historical Tagaung Kingdom during the first millennium CE

Today Tagaung is a major market for salt produced at Halin, which is used to preserve fish.

The town was captured by the People's Defense Force on 12 August 2024.

== Etymology ==
According to Kadu history, the name Tagaung stems from "leg step-on". Which literally means the "stepping place". Today this term is used to refer to a place belonging to someone. Other scholars claim that "Tagaung" derives from the Shan language term Takawng (Shan: တႃႈၵွင်; /taa3 kɔŋ1/), which means "drum ferry." In 225 AD, the Shu general Zhuge Liang is said to have used bronze drums to frighten 'savages' by placing them in torrents to produce the sound of military watchdrums at regular intervals.

== History ==
=== Pre-history and legend ===
The 19th-century chronicle Hmannan Yazawin introduces Tagaung as the very first capital of Burma, along with the adage Myanmar asa Tagaung ga (Myanmar starts from Tagaung), and it was the ancient capital of the Pyu, who were the forerunners of the Burmese people. Its history is steeped in myth and legend. The city is said to have been founded in 850 BC by King Abhiraja of the Sakya clan from Kapilavastu in India, before the time of the Buddha.

It has a very important place in Burmese culture also for the Tagaung Yazawin (Tagaung Chronicle) legends of Maung Pauk Kyaing the dragon slayer, the powerful blacksmith and his sister who became the household guardian spirits known as the Mahagiri Nats, and the blind twin princes who were sent adrift on a raft down the Ayeyarwady.

=== Tagaung Kingdom ===
Although the British historians G E Harvey and D G E Hall had dismissed the Abhiraja origin of the Burmese people, the antiquity of Tagaung itself is not in dispute. Ptolemy, the Greek geographer, writing in 140 AD, mentions Tugma Metropolis believed to be Tagaung at a spot in Upper Burma.

According to Chinese annals, Nanchao invaded and plundered the capital of a Pyu kingdom in 832 AD carrying off 3,000 captives. The chronicles of the Tang dynasty (AD 606–910) describe the land of the Pyu consisting of 18 states and 9 walled towns. In Upper Burma at least seven walled settlements over 200 hectares have been excavated so far.

=== Second millennium and later ===
Tagaung has been termed Anya Pagan (Upper Bagan) with its artefacts dating back to the Neolithic Age. It was one of the 43 outposts established by King Anawrahta (1044–1077) of Bagan along the eastern foothills of the Shan plateau in defense of his realm, before he embarked on military expeditions west to Bengal and east to Nanchao. The fortification to the east may reflect the city's location by the Ayeyarwady like Bagan but unlike Bagan its proximity to the frontier with Yunnan along the Shweli and Taping rivers. Tagaung was also within easy reach of mineral resources such as silver from Namtu, rubies from Mogok, jade, copper and iron by the Meza and Uru rivers.

==== South-west Silk Road ====
Marco Polo (1254–1324) was believed to have reached as far as Tagaung in his travels on one of his fact-finding missions sent by Kublai Khan.

A network of three overland routes from Yunnan westward to Bengal existed for shipping bullion between 1200 and 1500 AD. One of them followed the Shweli River, crossing the Irrawaddy at Tagaung, followed the Chindwin River north and crossed via the Imphal pass to Manipur. In the 1950s tens of thousands of cowries in Yunnan were found in tombs from the ancient past between the Warring States period (475 BCE–221 BCE) and the Western Han dynasty (206 BCE–9 CE). These cowries came from the Pacific and Indian oceans, especially from the Maldives, most likely along the same route.

== Modern Archaeology ==
Old Tagaung may have conformed to the tradition of first millennium Pyu cities which were divided into 9 quadrants. There are 3 walls: Wall 1 (19 hectares) around a low hillock on the north, Wall 2 (62 hectares) known as Anya Bagan, and Wall 3 (204 hectares) encompassing the other two. The western wall is missing in all three of them, and believed to have been washed away by the river as it changed its course over time. Archaeological excavations carried out at Tagaung had yielded Bronze Age drums, and also votive tablets connected to Anawrahta. More recent finds included urns, decorated roof-tile finials and finger-marked 'Pyu' bricks dated before 800 AD.

== Flora and fauna ==
Pheasants, partridge, toucans, pelicans and Sarus cranes inhabit around in-gyi seasonal lake and the tall swamp grass areas along with numerous fish in the lakes and streams. Tigers, elephants, banteng (Saing) and gaur were once common along the Shweli, with various kinds of deer around Tagaung.

== Economy ==
Timber, elephants and minerals were transported down from Mogok and the Shweli valley to Tagaung and other nearby river ports at Hsin Hnyat and Kyan Hnyat just south of Tagaung. Panning for gold ia done at Tonnge just north of Tagaung. Seasonal lakes and swamps make it possible to grow winter rice called mayin in addition to other crops producing edible oils and coriander.

Today Tagaung is a major market for salt produced at Halin, which is used to preserve fish.

China and Burma signed a joint venture agreement in July 2007 for an $800 million nickel mining project at Tagaung taung (Tagaung Hill), with a 75% stake held by the Chinese. Construction has begun and operations consisting of mining and smelting facilities, designed to produce 85,000 tons of ferronickel and 22,000 tons of nickel per annum, are scheduled to start in 2011.

== Transport ==
The Ayeyarwady remains the principal means to reach Tagaung. It is linked to Mandalay and to Kachin State in the north also by the Mandalay-Tagaung-Shwegu-Bhamo-Myitkyina Union Highway.

== Sources ==
- Songdong, David (2012). A Grammar of the Kadu (Asak) language. Australia: La Trobe.
