= Padah-Lin Caves =

Cave and archaeological site in Myanmar

- Padalin
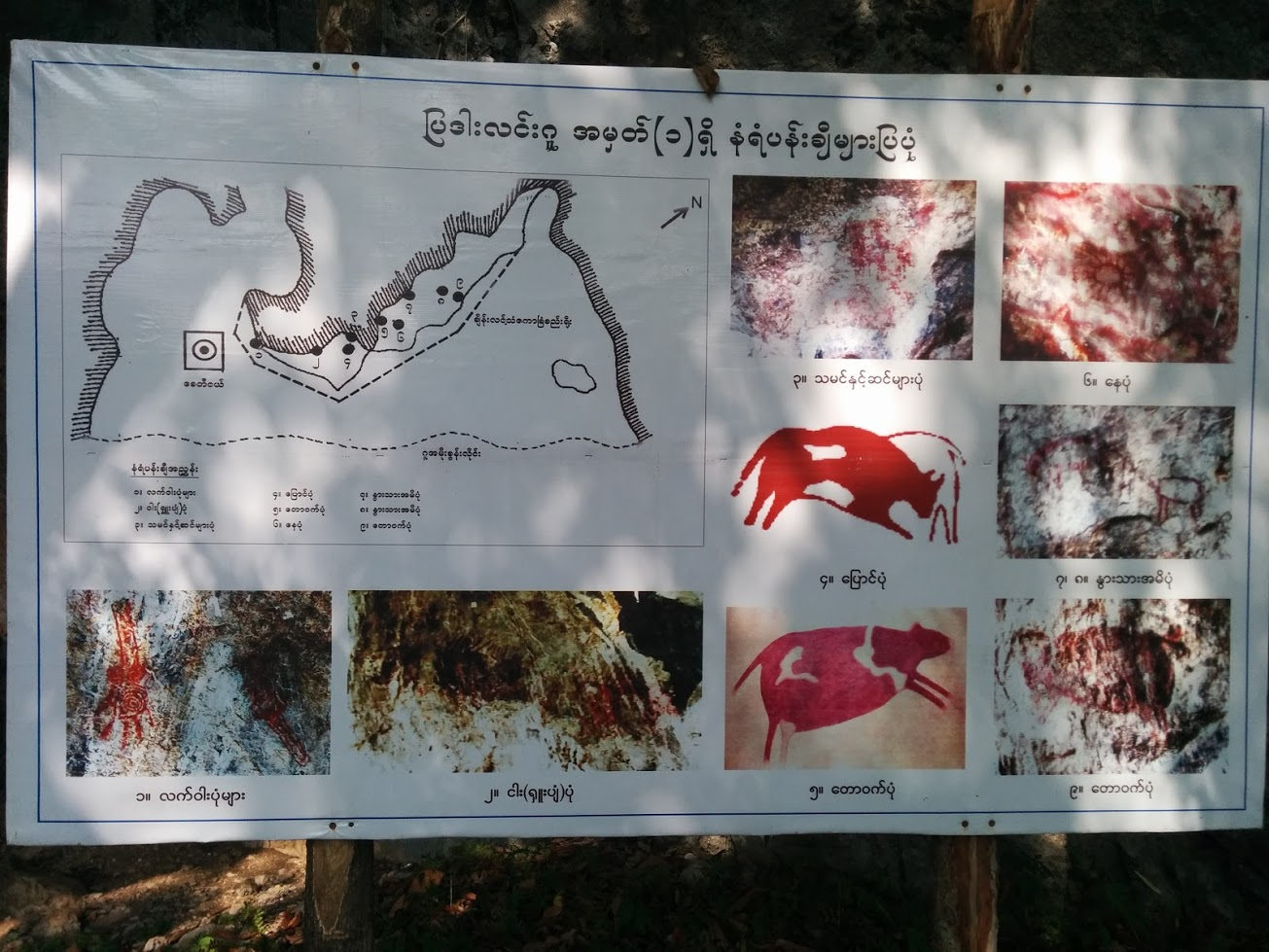
- Sign with cave layout and rock art

- Location in Myanmar
- 21°6′0″N 96°18′0″E
- Location: Ywangan Township, Taunggyi District, Shan State, Myanmar

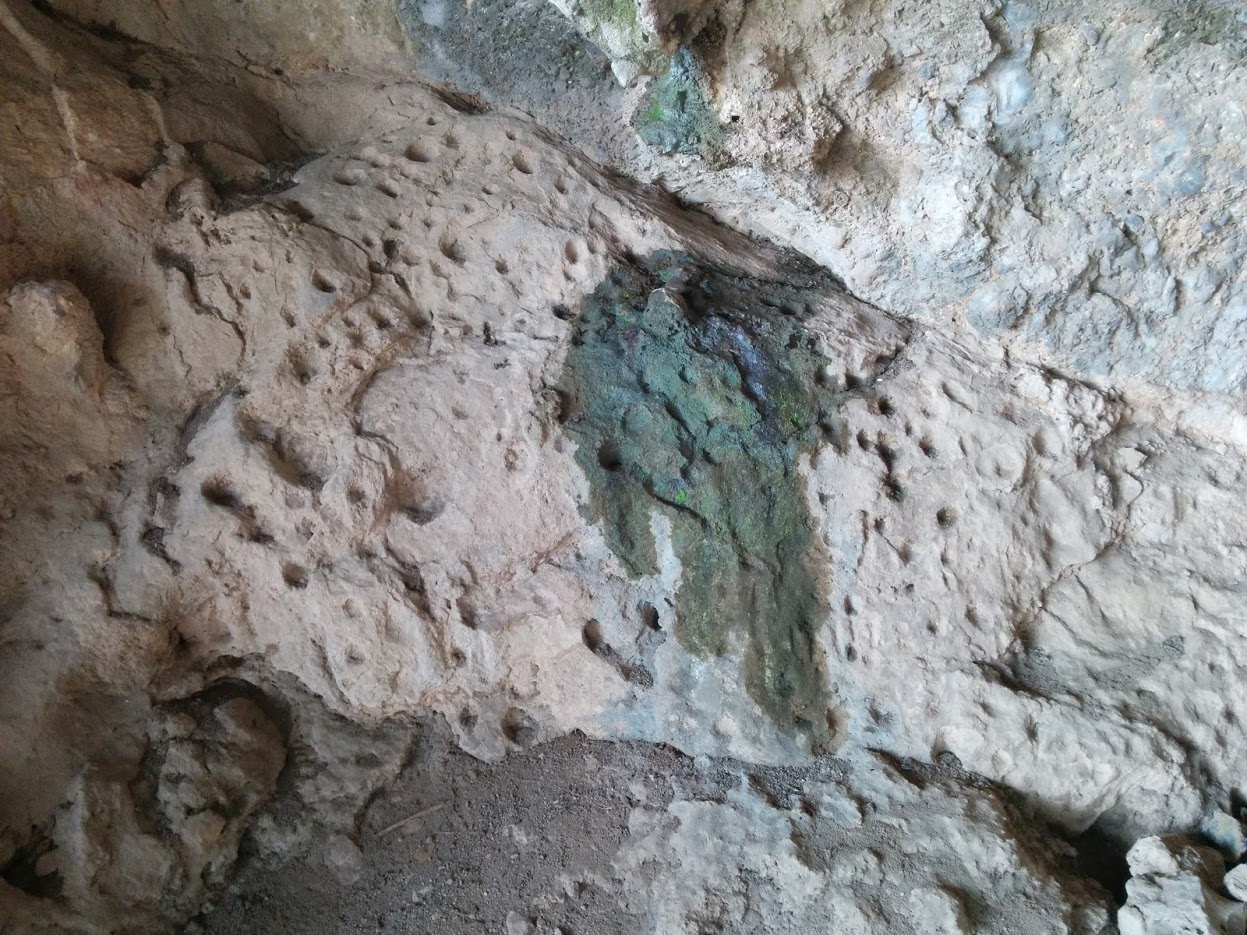
Cupules at Padah-Lin Cave 1

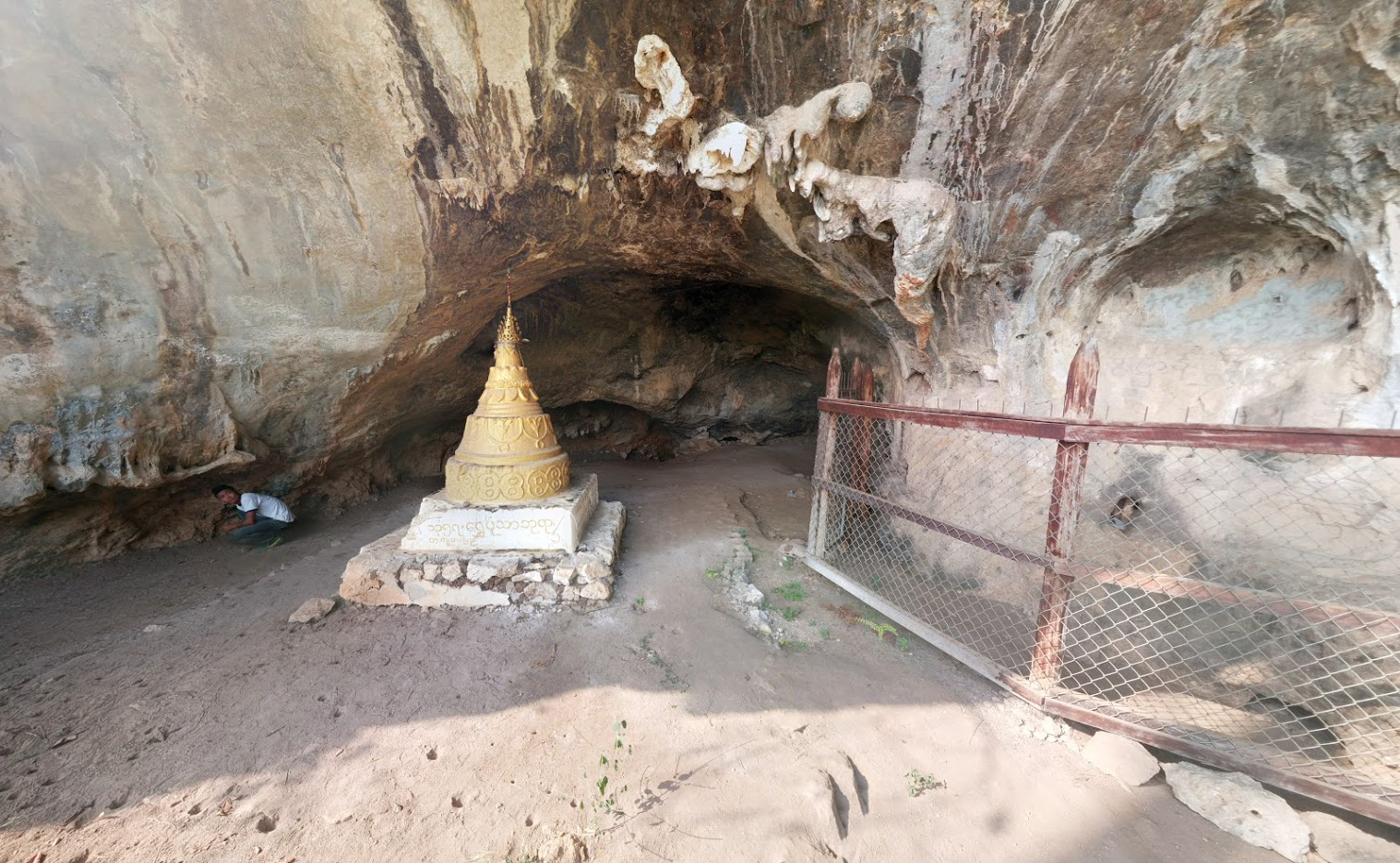
Buddhist stupa at Padah-Lin Cave 1

The Padah-Lin Caves (Burmese: ဗဒလင်းဂူ, pronounced [bədəlíɰ̃ ɡù]; also Padalin or Badalin) are limestone caves located in Taunggyi District, Shan State, Burma (Myanmar). It is located near a path from Nyaunggyat to Yebock, on a spur of the Nwalabo mountains within the Panlaung Reserved Forest. There are two caves; the smaller of the two is a rock shelter while the larger cave comprises nine chambers connected by narrow passages in a north-south axis, three large sinkholes that let natural light in, and several active speleothem formations.

== History ==
A superficial investigation of the caves in Shan State had been performed by the American South-East Expedition for Early Man in 1937 and 1938, and geologist U Khin Maung Kyaw discovered the paintings in 1960. In 1969–1972, the Burmese government organized a more in-depth investigation, and another expedition to the caves was mounted in 2004.

The site was added to the UNESCO World Heritage Tentative List on 4 October 1996 in the Cultural category.

== Contents ==
Red ochre paintings of human hands, fish, bulls, bison, deer and other objects are visible at the rock shelter. The art has not been directly dated. The walls of the cave have also been decorated with carved patterns. More than 300 cupules have been documented in the rockshelter.

Excavations at the rock shelter from 1969 to 1972 recovered seven pieces of charcoal and bone that were radiocarbon dated to between 1,750 and 13,000 years BP. The excavation also recovered over 1,600 stone artifacts as well as many pieces of bone and red ochre. The stone artifacts include unifacial choppers, bifacial chopping tools, perforated stone rings, adzes and scrapers. Excavations in the larger cave conducted by Ben Marwick in 2016 revealed deposits dating to 65,000 years ago, and flaked stone artefacts dating to 25,000 years ago.

A small Buddhist stupa has been erected at the eastern end of the rockshelter, and several stupas of varying sizes have been built in the chambers of the cave.

== See also ==
- Prehistory of Burma
