= Tianbao War =

750–754 war in Yunnan, China

Date	750–754
Location	Yunnan
Result	Nanzhao victory: Nanzhao breaks away from the Tang dynasty and forms an alliance with Tibet.

Belligerents
Nanzhao; Tibet	Tang dynasty

Commanders and leaders
Geluofeng (閣羅鳳); Kyili Zhi (བློན་ཁྲི་ལེ་ཞུ་)	Xianyu Zhongtong (鮮于仲通); Li Mi (李宓)

The Tianbao War (Chinese: 天宝战争) occurred between Nanzhao and Tang China in the 8th century.

== Background ==
In 649, the chieftain of the Mengshe tribe, Xinuluo (細奴邏, Senola), founded the Great Meng (大蒙) and took the title of Qijia Wang (奇嘉王; "Outstanding King"). He acknowledged Tang suzerainty. In the year 737 AD, Xinuluo's son Piluoge (皮羅閣) united the Six Zhaos in succession, establishing a new kingdom called Nanzhao (Southern Zhao). In 738, the Tang granted Piluoge the Chinese-style name Meng Guiyi ("return to righteousness") and the title of "Prince of Yunnan".

Piluoge died in 748, succeeded by his son Geluofeng (閣羅鳳). Geluofeng and his wife once visited Tang officials, but the Yunnan governor Zhang Qiantuo (張虔陀) treated them rudely. Zhang also levied unreasonable taxes on them, but Geluofeng mostly refused to pay. Zhang then sent his subordinates to insult Geluofeng, and falsely accused him of treason to the Tang court. Geluofeng was thus resentful and planned to revolt.

== War ==
In 750, Geluofeng raised an army to capture 32 native counties of Yunnan and killed Zhang Qiantuo. Yang Guozhong (楊國忠), the Tang governor of Xichuan, sent Xianyu Zhongtong (鮮于仲通) to lead 60,000 troops to attack Nanzhao. Nanzhao was defeated step by step. Geluofeng sent envoys to the Tang dynasty to apologize and request peace with Tang, but the Tang dynasty refused. Nanzhao then turned to Tibet for help. The Tang army advanced close to the Nanzhao capital, but was defeated. Geluofeng thus proclaimed himself Eastern Emperor (東帝) and became the sworn younger brother of Tibetan Emperor Mé Aktsom, no longer loyal to the Tang dynasty.

In 754, Tang general Li Mi (李宓) led an army of 70,000 to attack Nanzhao. When they reached the capital, Geluofeng stayed in the city and refused to fight. Li Mi's army ran out of food, and most soldiers died of disease, malaria, and hunger. Li Mi led the rest of his troops back, but was pursued by Nanzhao-Tibetan coalition forces, and his entire army was wiped out. Li Mi himself committed suicide by jumping into the river. After this defeat, the Tang dynasty no longer had the strength to attack Nanzhao.

== Aftermath ==
As Tibet suffered heavy losses in many defeats, Tibet imposed excessive taxes and military service on Nanzhao. In 794, Nanzhao launched the battle of Shenchuan, successfully broke away from Tibet, and restored friendly relations with the Tang dynasty.
