= Achitchaung =

- Village
- Location in Burma
- Coordinates: 19°37′N 93°50′E
- Country: Burma
- Division: Rakhine State
- District: Kyaukpyu
- Township: Ann Township
- Time zone: UTC+6:30 (MST)

Achitchaung is a village in Ann Township, Kyaukpyu District, in central Rakhine State in the westernmost part of Burma (Myanmar). It is southwest of Ann, near Yebôk. Achitchaung is located near the Amyeak and Kyaukpadaung rivers.
