= Prehistory of Myanmar =

History of Myanmar before 200 BCE

The prehistory of Burma (Myanmar) spanned hundreds of millennia to about 200 BCE. Archaeological evidence shows that the Homo erectus had lived in the region now known as Burma as early as 750,000 years ago, and the Homo sapiens about 11,000 BCE, in a Stone Age culture called the Anyathian. Named after the central dry zone sites where most of the early settlement finds are located, the Anyathian period was when plants and animals were first domesticated and polished stone tools appeared in Burma. Though these sites are situated in fertile areas, evidence shows these early people were not yet familiar with agricultural methods.

The Bronze Age arrived c. 1500 BCE when people in the region were turning copper into bronze, growing rice, and domesticating chickens and pigs. The Iron Age arrived around 500 BCE when iron-working settlements emerged in an area south of present-day Mandalay. Evidence also shows rice growing settlements of large villages and small cities that traded with their surroundings and as far as China between 500 BCE and 200 CE. Bronze-decorated coffins and burial sites filled with the earthenware remains of feasting and drinking provide a glimpse of the lifestyle of their affluent society.

Evidence of trade suggests ongoing migrations throughout the prehistory period though the earliest evidence of mass migrations only points to c. 200 BCE when the Pyu people, the earliest inhabitants of Burma of whom records are extant, began to move into the upper Irrawaddy valley from present-day Yunnan. The Pyu went on to found settlements throughout the plains region centred on the confluence of the Irrawaddy and Chindwin rivers that had been inhabited since the Paleolithic. The Pyu were followed by various groups such as the Mon, the Arakanese and the Mranma (Burmans) in the first millennium CE. By the Pagan period, inscriptions show Thets, Kadus, Sgaws, Kanyans, Palaungs, Was and Shans also inhabited the Irrawaddy valley and its peripheral regions.

== Prehistory ==
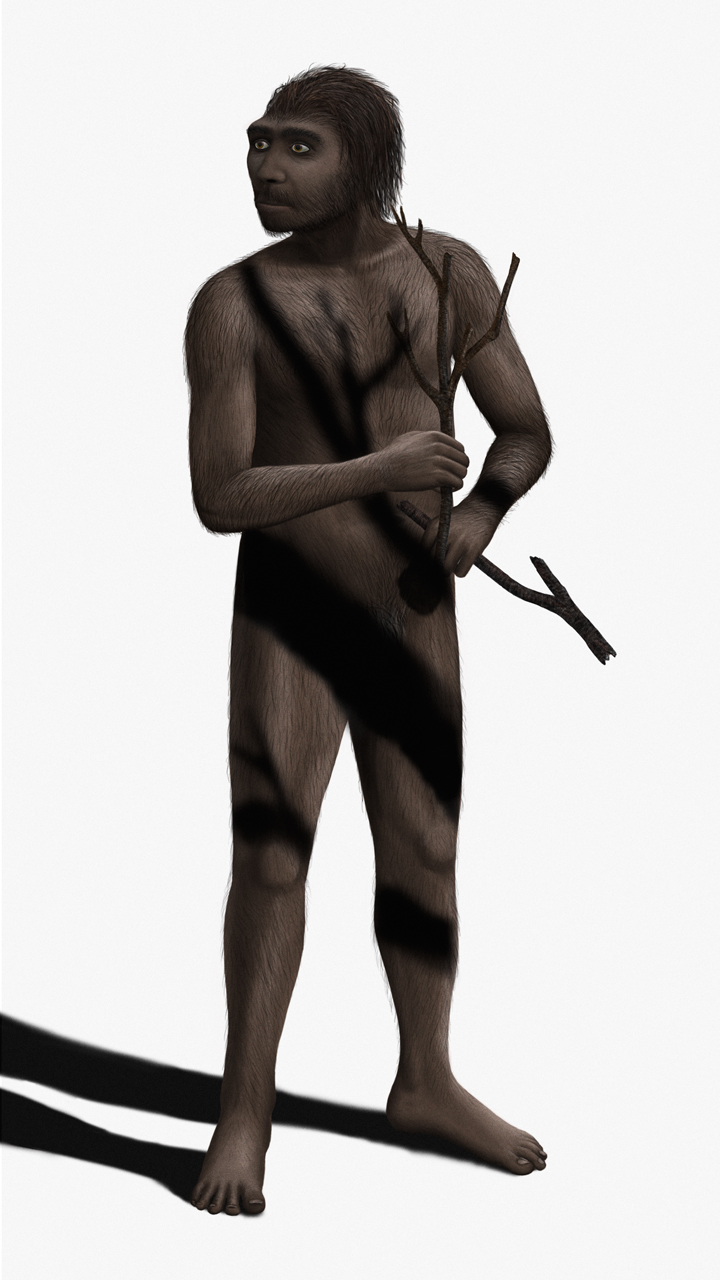
Homo erectus

Some of the earliest anthropoid primate fossils in the world, dating to about 40 million years ago, were found in the Pondaung Formations in Pale Township, central Myanmar. These fossils include forms from the Eosimiidae and Amphipithecidae families and challenge beliefs that these early anthropoids originated from Africa.

Homo erectus began to settle in Burma in 750,000 BCE before the arrival of Homo sapiens from Africa. Archaeological evidence of Homo sapiens has been dated to about 25,000 BP in central Myanmar. The pre-migration period of Burma spanned from 11,000 BCE to 4,000 BCE before the mass migration. This era is characterised by Stone Age culture which later advanced to Bronze and Iron Age cultures. The cave ritual system, which was later used for Buddhist caves, is believed to have been rooted in the earliest civilisation of this era. The effect can be seen today in many Buddhism ritual caves across Burma.

=== Timeline ===
Date	Event
750,000- 275,000 years BP	Lower Palaeolithic people of early Anyathian culture (Homo erectus) lived along the bank of the Ayeyawaddy river.
275,000-25,000 years BP	Lower Palaeolithic people of late Anyathian culture
11,000 BCE	Upper Palaeolithic people (Homo sapiens) live in Badah-lin caves which situated in Ywagan township in southern Shan States.
7,000 - 2,000 BCE	Neolithic people live in central Burma, Kachin State, Shan States, Mon State, Taninthayi Region, and along the bank of the Chindwin and Ayeyarwady rivers.
1500 BCE	Earliest evidence of copper and bronze works, rice growing, domesticating chickens and pigs in Irrawaddy valley
500 BCE	Iron-working settlements south of present-day Mandalay
200 BCE	Pyu people enter the Irrawaddy valley from Yunnan

=== Mesolithic age ===
Roughly polished stone implements of various sizes are often found in the Shan States of eastern Burma. Pebble tools, including choppers and chopping tools, are found in the Pleistocene terrace deposits of the Irrawaddy Valley of Upper Myanmar. These complexes are collectively known as the Anyathians, thus, the culture is called the Anyathian culture. The Early Anyathian is characterised by single-edged core implements made on natural fragments of fossil wood and silicified tuff, which are associated with crude flake implements. However, domestications and polishing of stones, which are possible signs of Neolithic culture, are not known until the discovery of Padah Lin caves in Southern Shan State.

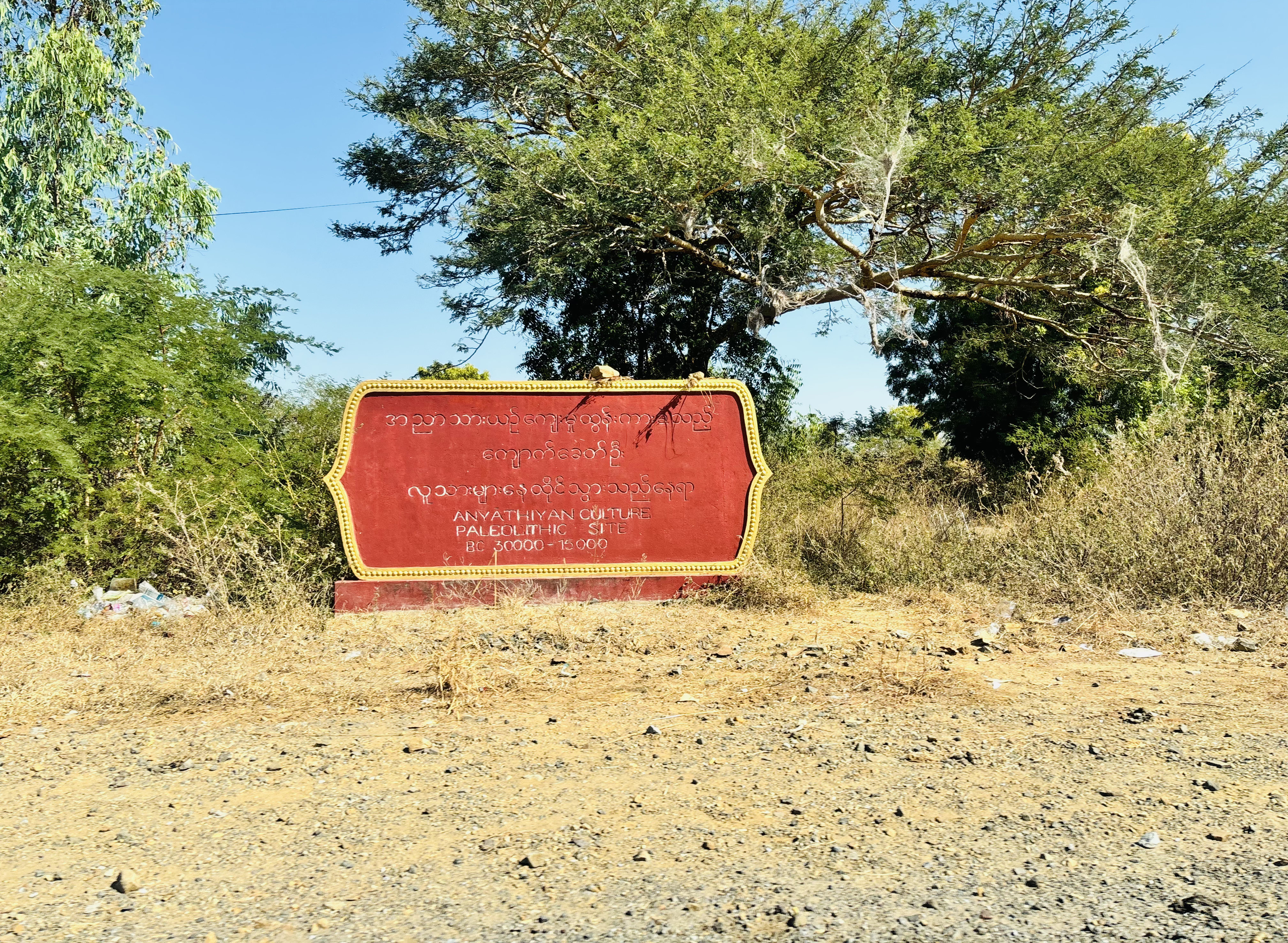
Anyathian Culture Paleolithic Site at Nyaung-U Township

=== Neolithic age ===
Three caves located near Taunggyi at the edge of the Shan Plateau, depict the Neolithic age when farming, domestication, and polished stone tools first appeared. They are dated between 11,000 and 6,000 BCE. The most significant of these is the Padah-Lin cave where over 1,600 of stones and cave paintings have been uncovered. These paintings lie from ten to twelve feet above the floor level depicting figures in red ochre of two human hands, a fish, bulls, bisons, a deer and probably the hind of an elephant. The paintings indicate that the cave was probably used for religious rituals. If so, these caves could be one of the earliest sites used for worshiping in Burma. The use of caves for religious purposes continued into later periods. Thus, Buddhist Burmese use of cave worshiping originates from the earlier Animist period.

=== Bronze Age ===
The finding of bronze axes at Nyaunggan located in Shwebo township suggests that Bronze Age of Burma began around 1500 BC in parallel with the earlier stages of Southeast Asian bronze production. This period spans from 1500 to 1000 BC during which knowledge of the smelting and casting of copper and tin seems to have spread rapidly along the Neolithic exchange routes.

Another site is the area of Taungthaman, near Irrawaddy River within the walls of the 18th century capital, Amarapura, occupied from the late Neolithic through the early Iron Age, around the middle of the first millennium BC. Small trades and barters, as well as Animism had already begun in this age. The Taungthaman site was discovered in 1971 and bulldozed by the State Administration Council in 2023.

=== Iron Age ===
Bronze and Iron Age cultures overlapped in Burma. This era saw the growth of agriculture and access to copper resources of the Shan hills, the semi-precious stone and iron resources of the Mount Popa Plateau, and the salt resources of Halin. The wealth is evident in grave items bought from Chinese kingdoms. A notable characteristics of the people of this era is that they buried their dead together with decorative ceramics and common household objects such as bowls and spoons.

== Pre-Pagan period ==
The prehistory period came to a close c. 200 BCE when the Pyu people, the earliest inhabitants of Burma of whom records are extant, began to move into the upper Irrawaddy valley from north of present-day Yunnan. This era marks the beginning of urbanisation when city states began to be established. Several sizeable first millennium cities were founded by the Pyu, the Mon and the Arakanese.

=== Pyu ===
Pyu city states' (Burmese: ပျူ မြို့ပြ နိုင်ငံများ) were a group of city-states that existed from c. 2nd century BCE to mid-11th century CE in present-day Upper Burma (Myanmar). The city-states were founded as part of the southward migration by the Tibeto-Burman-speaking Pyu. The thousand-year period, often referred to as the Pyu millennium, linked the Bronze Age to the beginning of the classical states period when the Pagan Dynasty emerged in the late 9th century.

The city-states—five major walled cities and several smaller towns have been excavated—were all located in the three main irrigated regions of Upper Burma: the Mu valley, the Kyaukse plains and Minbu region, around the confluence of the Irrawaddy and Chindwin rivers. Part of an overland trade route between China and India, the Pyu realm gradually expanded south. Halin, founded in the 1st century CE at the northern edge of Upper Burma, was the largest and most important city until around the 7th or 8th century when it was superseded by Sri Ksetra (near modern Pyay) at the southern edge. Twice as large as Halin, Sri Ksetra was the largest and most influential Pyu centre.

The Pyu culture was heavily influenced by trade with India, importing Buddhism as well as other cultural, architectural and political concepts, which would have an enduring influence on later Burmese culture and political organisation. The Pyu calendar, based on the Buddhist calendar, later became the Burmese calendar. Latest scholarship, though yet not settled, suggests that the Pyu script, based on the Indian Brahmi script, may have been the source of the Burmese script.

The millennium-old civilisation came crashing down in the 9th century when the city-states were destroyed by repeated invasions from the Kingdom of Nanzhao. The Mranma (Burmans), who came down with the Nanzhao, set up a garrison town at Pagan (Bagan) at the confluence of Irrawaddy and Chindwin. Pyu settlements remained in Upper Burma for the next three centuries but the Pyu gradually were absorbed into the expanding Pagan Empire. The Pyu language still existed until the late 12th century. By the 13th century, the Pyu had assumed the Burman ethnicity. The histories/legends of the Pyu were also incorporated to those of the Burmans.

=== Mon ===
The Mon people of Haribhunjaya and Dvaravati kingdoms in modern Thailand may have entered present-day Lower Burma as early as the 6th century CE. According to mainstream scholarship, the Mon had founded at least two small kingdoms (or large city-states) centred on Pegu (Bago) and Thaton by the mid 9th century. The earliest external reference to a Lower Burma "kingdom" was in 844–848 by Arab geographers. The Mon practised Theravada Buddhism. The kingdoms were prosperous from trade. The Kingdom of Thaton is widely considered to be the fabled kingdom of Suvarnabhumi (or Golden Land), referred to by the tradesmen of Indian Ocean.

=== Burmans ===
The Burmans who had come down with the early 9th Nanzhao raids of the Pyu states remained in Upper Burma. (Trickles of Burman migrations may have begun as early as the 7th century.) Like that of the Pyu, the original home of Burmans prior to Yunnan is believed to be present-day Qinghai and Gansu provinces. After the Nanzhao attacks had greatly weakened the Pyu city-states, large numbers of Burman warriors and their families entered the Pyu realm in the 830s and 840s and settled at the confluence of the Irrawaddy and Chindwin rivers, perhaps to help Nanzhao pacify the surrounding countryside. Over the next two hundred years, the small principality gradually grew to include its immediate surrounding areas— to about 200 miles north to south and 80 miles from east to west by Anawrahta's accession in 1044. Historically verifiable Burmese history begins with Anawrahta's accession.

== See also ==
- Migration period of ancient Burma
