= Kwingyi =

- Village
- Location in Burma
- Coordinates: 19°28′34″N 94°4′29″E
- Country: Burma
- State: Rakhine State
- District: Kyaukpyu District
- Township: Ann Township
- Time zone: UTC+6.30 (MST)

Kwingyi is a village in Ann Township, Kyaukpyu District, in the Rakhine State of southwestern Myanmar. It is located 50.9 kilometres (31.6 mi) by road south of Ann and 11 kilometres (6.8 mi) south of Thadwe.
