= Yebôk =

- Village
- Location in Burma
- Coordinates: 19°37′14″N 93°53′18″E
- Country: Burma
- State: Rakhine State
- District: Kyaukpyu District
- Township: Ann Township
- Time zone: UTC+6:30 (MST)

Yebôk is a village in Ann Township, Kyaukpyu District, in the Rakhine State of southwestern Burma. It is located southwest of Sakanmaw and south of Mawhun.
