= Thadwe =

- Village
- Location in Burma
- Coordinates: 19°30′57″N 94°2′10″E
- Country: Burma
- State: Rakhine State
- District: Kyaukpyu District
- Township: Ann Township
- Time zone: UTC+6.30 (MST)

Thadwe or Tadwe is a village in Ann Township, Kyaukpyu District, in the Rakhine State of southwestern Burma. It is located 40 kilometres (25 mi) by road south of Ann and 17 kilometres (11 mi) south of Sakanmaw.
