= Battle of Shenchuan =

794 battle between Nanzhao and Tibet

Date	794
Location	Yunnan
Result	Nanzhao victory: Liberation of Nanzhao from Tibetan control; Restoration of Nanzhao–Tang friendship

Belligerents
Nanzhao	Tibet

Commanders and leaders
Yimouxun (異牟尋)	Ne-shé (བློན་ནེན་ཞེས་)

The Battle of Shenchuan (Chinese: 神川之战) was launched by Nanzhao against Tibet at Shenchuan (now Jinsha River) in 794.

== Background ==
After the Tianbao War in 750, Nanzhao and Tibet became brother states. In 779, Yimouxun (異牟尋) ascended the throne of Nanzhao. Tibet downgraded Nanzhao's status from a brother state to a vassal state.

When Tibet attacked Tang territory, the Nanzhao army were often used as the vanguard. As Tibet suffered heavy losses across many defeats, Tibet imposed heavy taxes on Nanzhao. Tibet also built castles in strategic locations in Nanzhao and demanded that Nanzhao soldiers garrison there year after year, which made Yimouxun quite distressed.

Zheng Hui (鄭回), the prime minister of Nanzhao, then suggested restoring relations with the Tang dynasty, who would impose relatively few obligation. Yimouxun agreed. He secretly sent envoys to discuss with Tang officials about leaving Tibet and returning to the Tang dynasty.

== Battle ==
In 794, Tibet asked Nanzhao to recruit 10,000 soldiers. Nanzhao King Yimouxun used the excuse that his country was weak and only sent 3,000 soldiers. Tibet was dissatisfied and demanded an increase to 5,000. Yimouxun seized the opportunity and personally led tens of thousands of troops to follow the Tibet troops. After traveling overnight to Shenchuan, he launched a surprise attack on the Tibet army and won. Nanzhao took advantage of the victory to capture 16 forts, capturing the five Tibetan princes stationed there and more than 100,000 civilians.

== Aftermath ==
In August, Yimouxun sent his brother and 27 others to the Tang dynasty to present maps, local products, and the seals bestowed by Tibet, requesting to rejoin the tributary system of China. In response to Nanzhao's request, the Tang dynasty sent envoys to the capital of Nanzhao to canonize Yimouxun as the King of Nanzhao. Nanzhao's political status granted by Tang was upgraded from a native state before the Tianbao War to a tributary state.
