= Ailao Kingdom =

Former country

Ailao 哀牢
- 3rd century BC–76 A.D.
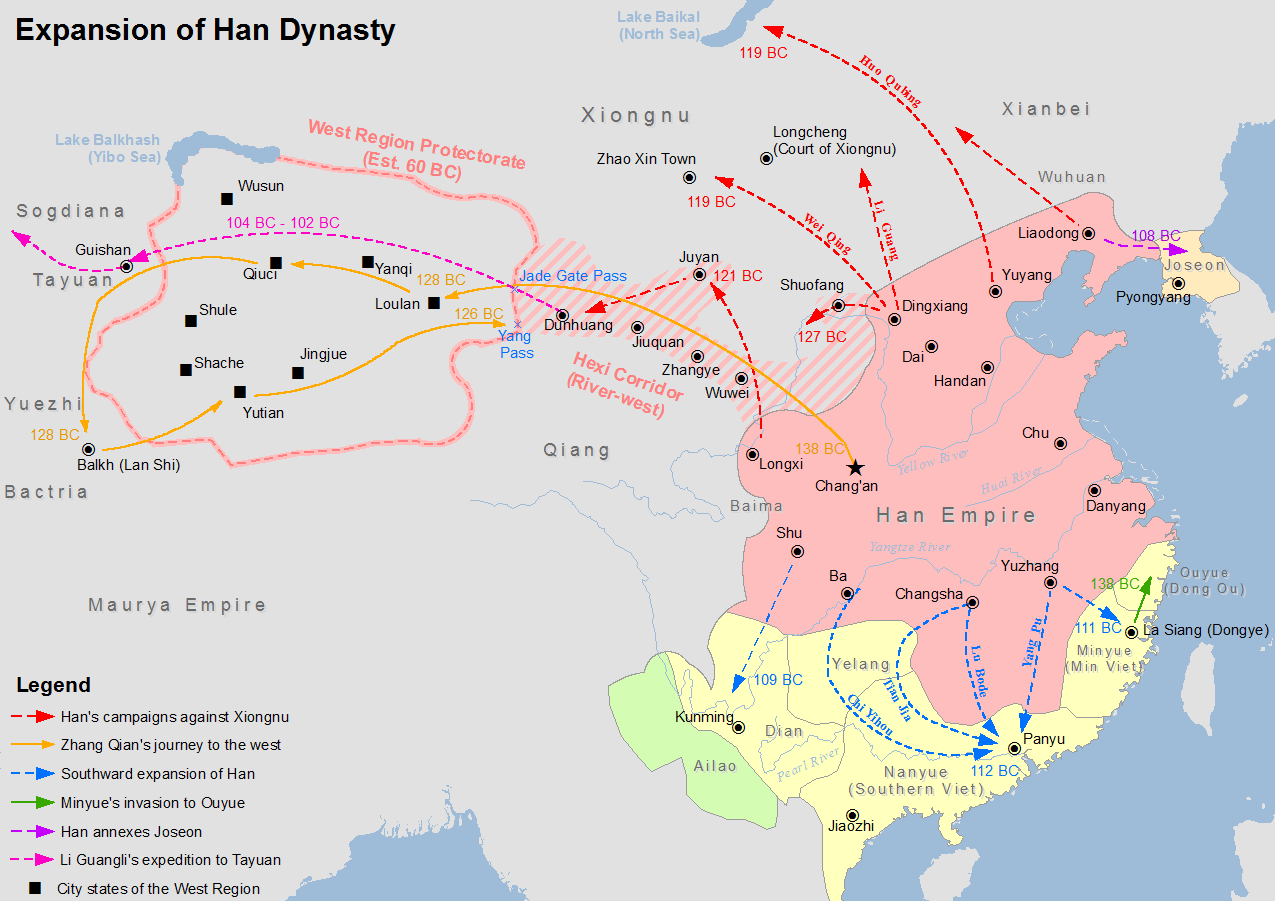
- A map depicting the expansion of the Han dynasty in the 2nd century BCE.
- Government: Monarchy
  - Founding King: Jiulong (九隆)
  - Last king: Liumao (柳貌)
- History
  - Established: 3rd century BC
  - Annexed by the Han dynasty: 76 A.D.
Succeeded by
Han dynasty; Nanzhao
- Today part of: China

The Ailao Kingdom (哀牢; 3rd century BC–76 A.D.) was an ancient tribal confederation or an early state in the southwest region of China in modern-day Yunnan and Myanmar. It was founded during the Warring States period by a legendary king known as Jiulong (九隆). During the Han dynasty, it submitted allegiance; however, a rebellion led to complete annexation in 76 A.D., after which no further records were made of the polity.

== Records ==
In the Book of Later Han, an excerpt of the Biography of the Ailao is provided. This excerpt was written by Yang Zhong (杨终), also known as Yang Zishan (杨子山), in 68 A.D. Yang Zhong, who had worked in the Ailao Kingdom, was sent to the capital as a reporting officer. The records of the Ailao in the archives were faulty, and upon return to the Ailao Kingdom he presented the Biographies of the Ailao (Ailao Zhuan 哀牢傳) to Emperor Ming of Han. The complete document has been lost, along with the exact number of volumes of the original. No records of the Sui or Tang dynasty record it, suggesting it was lost before the Sui dynasty. During the late Ming dynasty, a new version, known as Ailao Shizhuan (哀牢世转), was cited in the Unofficial History of Nanzhao (南詔野史). Yang Zhong had also worked with Ban Gu's Annals to form the Dongguan Records of the Han (东观汉记). However, the surviving parts of the Dongguan Records of the Han record only that, in 69 A.D., the King of Ailao led his people to admire China and that Yongchang Commandery was established as a result.

A few versions of the Biography of the Ailao exist in larger texts and collections. The oldest being the Chronicles of the States South of Mount Hua (华阳国志). Other records include the Book of Later Han, Commentary on the Water Classic and Origins of Bai Kingdom (白国因由) and Records of a Journey to Dian (滇程记).

== Geography ==
The Han Dynasty records the Ailao Kingdom as measuring between 3000 li east to west and 4600 li north to south. The territory is described as extending down to the Irrawaddy River into the Indian Ocean, sprawling across modern-day Yongchang, Lincang and Sisong Panna. The Huayang Guozhi (华阳国志) records that the Ailao was a multiethnic polity with peoples such as the Min-Pu (閩濮), Jiu-Liao (鳩僚), Piao-Yue (僄越), Luo-Pu (裸濮; Naked Pu) and Yuandu (身毒) (Indians). Some of the commanders were known as kings. Historians have thus argued it functioned as a confederation rather than a unitary polity. The geography and the presence of Indians suggest that the Ailao had contact with India via trade links, while Chinese records imply that it had been uncontacted before them.

== Customs ==
The Ailao people were described in the Book of Later Han as piercing their noses and wearing earrings. The chiefs wore earrings which stretched down the lobes to below the shoulder, while most commoners stretched them to the shoulders only. The land was described as fertile for agriculture, mulberry trees and silkworm harvesting. They could dye fabrics and weave patterns into the cloths, sometimes making cloth from tree flowers. The Huayang Guozhi states that the land produced copper, iron, lead, tin, gold, silver, and pearls. With references to the Guangzhi (廣志), many other goods, plants, and animals are recorded. The Ailaos also drank wine from fermented grains. Wang outlines that in the Yongchang Record (永昌记) incorporated in the Taiping Yulan Volume 358, the excerpt states the King of Ailao rode a horse when hunting, the saddle adorned with gold and silver and decorated with Kingfisher feathers.

== Governance ==
Wang argues that the Ailao kingdom record states that 77 "kings" joined the Han Empire, suggesting that these were more like town chiefs and unaffiliated with the Ailao dynasty recorded under Liumao (柳貌).

== History ==
=== Origins ===
According to the Biography of the Ailao excerpts in the Book of the Later Han, an origin story for the first king of the Ailao is given. The Kingdom is also said to be named after a mountain within its territory called Ailao. The story begins with a woman who lived at the Ailao mountain called Yi (依) or Shakun (沙壼); often referred to as Shayi in other records (沙壹). While fishing, she touched a log submerged in the water which appeared to be alive. She was soon pregnant and gave birth to ten sons. The log was then transformed into a dragon and asked Shayi where his sons were. Nine of the sons ran away, while the youngest could not run and hence stayed with the dragon and licked him on the back. Shayi spoke with her language described as "bird-like", and the youngest son was called Jiulong (九隆); explained as Jiu (九) for 'back' and long (隆) for sitting. In other records, such as Chronicles of Mount Hua, he is called Yuanlong (元隆), which the text explains as "giving company". Upon growing up, his brothers elected him as king because he was licked by the dragon father. Later on, a man and wife who had ten daughters married Jiulong and the brothers and prospered and multiplied. The descendants of Jiulong were said to disperse over the land in smaller kingdoms.

=== Han dynasty ===
The Book of Later Han records the beginning of relations up to the annexation of the kingdom. In 51 A.D. the king of Ailao, Xianli (賢栗) sent soldiers in rafts via bamboo and wood. The Ailao attacked the various non-Han tribes that served as frontier garrisons. They were overwhelmed and captured. However, on their return to Ailao, a storm caused a violent surge as they crossed the rivers, drowning the soldiers. Xianli sent six subordinate kings (or chiefs) to attack the frontier tribes of the Han Empire once more, resulting in the deaths of all six. When the Ailao people buried the six leaders, tigers dug up the corpses and ate them, leading the Ailao to retreat. The records claim that Xianli recognised the Mandate of Heaven, under which the Han dynasty was led by a sage emperor, compelling him to submit instead. As a result, Xianli integrated 2770 households with 17659 people. Emperor Guangwu of Han conferred the title of chietain on Xianli and others, and they participated in court and paid tribute.

Later, the Ailao King Liumao (柳貌) sent his son to lead their people to integrate into the Han Empire. He joined with 77 subordinate kings or chiefs and a total of 51,890 households and 553,711 individuals in 69 A.D. Under Liumao, the kingdom was adminsitratively split with Ailao and Bonan and six new counties. These six counties of Buewi, Xtang, Bisu, Yeyu, Xialong and Yunnan became Yongchang Commandery. The Commandant Zheng Chun (郑纯) made an agreement of contributing two sets of robes and one 'hu' unit of salt. After his death, the new commandant was killed by a king or chief known as Leilao (類牢) in open rebellion. The Ailao rebels attacked Bonan and burned civilian homes. The Han sent 9000 troops and several local leaders attacked Leilao in Bonan where he was defeated and beheaded. His head was sent to the capital, where the Kunming General Lu Cheng was eneoffed as Marquis.

== Leaders ==
The Biographies of the Ailao in the Book of Later Han record that after Jiulong, many names are not known and cannot be counted, only up to Jingao and onwards where there are clear records. Among all of the names mentioned in the lineage recorded, only Liu Mao is recorded in historical events.

- Jiulong (九隆)
- Jingao (禁高)
- Xi (吸)
- Jianfei (建非)
- Ailao (哀牢)
- Sang'ou (桑藕)
- Liucheng (柳承)
- Liumao (柳貌)
- Huli (扈栗)

Other mentions of leaders not in the dynastic text are:

- Xianli (賢栗)
- Leilao (類牢)

=== Successor links ===
Historians such as Charles Backus write that the succeeding Nanzhao Kingdom in the region adopted the Ailao Kingdom as their ancestors and absorbed their myths and legendsas their own. This is alluded in early Chinese sources that state that Nanzhao founders inhabited Ailao territory and they they claimed that they were descendants of Ailao.

== Archaelogical Excavation ==
An archaeological excavation was carried out in Changning at the Dadian Mountains at an ancient cemetery. A total of 198 tombs were cleared and 268 burial objects were unearthed. The site represents a distinctive local Yunnan Bronze Age culture of two ethnic groups. According to the Later Book of Han and the Chronicles of Huayang, the earthen cave tombs appear consistent with historical records and research concerning the ancient Ailao kingdom. This led archaeologists to conclude that the tombs are remnants of ancient Ailao. The ethnic group identified in this Ailao burial site is not conclusively identified, but it's been suggested it aligns closely with Di-Qiang peoples.

== Historiography ==
Initial historical studies conflated the Ailao kingdom with the Tai people. De Lacouperie conflated the descriptions of the Ailao by annotating them as Täic. Evans argues that this does not prove a connection with current Tai-speaking groups. Evans argues that neither the Ailao Kingdom nor the Nanzhao Kingdom were Tai. Certain historical reconstructions by Lao and Thai historians have ignored Chinese documentation and texts.

== Sources ==
=== Articles ===
- Daniels, Christian (2021). "Nanzhao as a Southeast Asian Kingdom c.738-902". Journal of Southeast Asian Studies. 52 (2): 188–213. doi:10.1017/S0022463421000424.
- Evans, Grant (2014). "The Ai-Lao and Nan Chao/Tali Kingdom". The Journal of the Siam Society. 102 (1): 221–256.

=== Books ===
- Brinckmann, Ludwig (2024). The ‘Biographies of Āiláo’ (PDF). Yunnan: The Yunnan Papers.
- Fan, Ye. Book of Later Han. Chinese Text Project.
- Wang, Shuwu (1996). 雲南古佚書鈔 [Yunnan Ancient Lost Books] (in Chinese). Kunming: 雲南人民出版社. ISBN 9787222020023.
