= Dachanghe =

Kingdom from 902 to 928 in modern Yunnan, China

Dachanghe 大長和
- 902–928
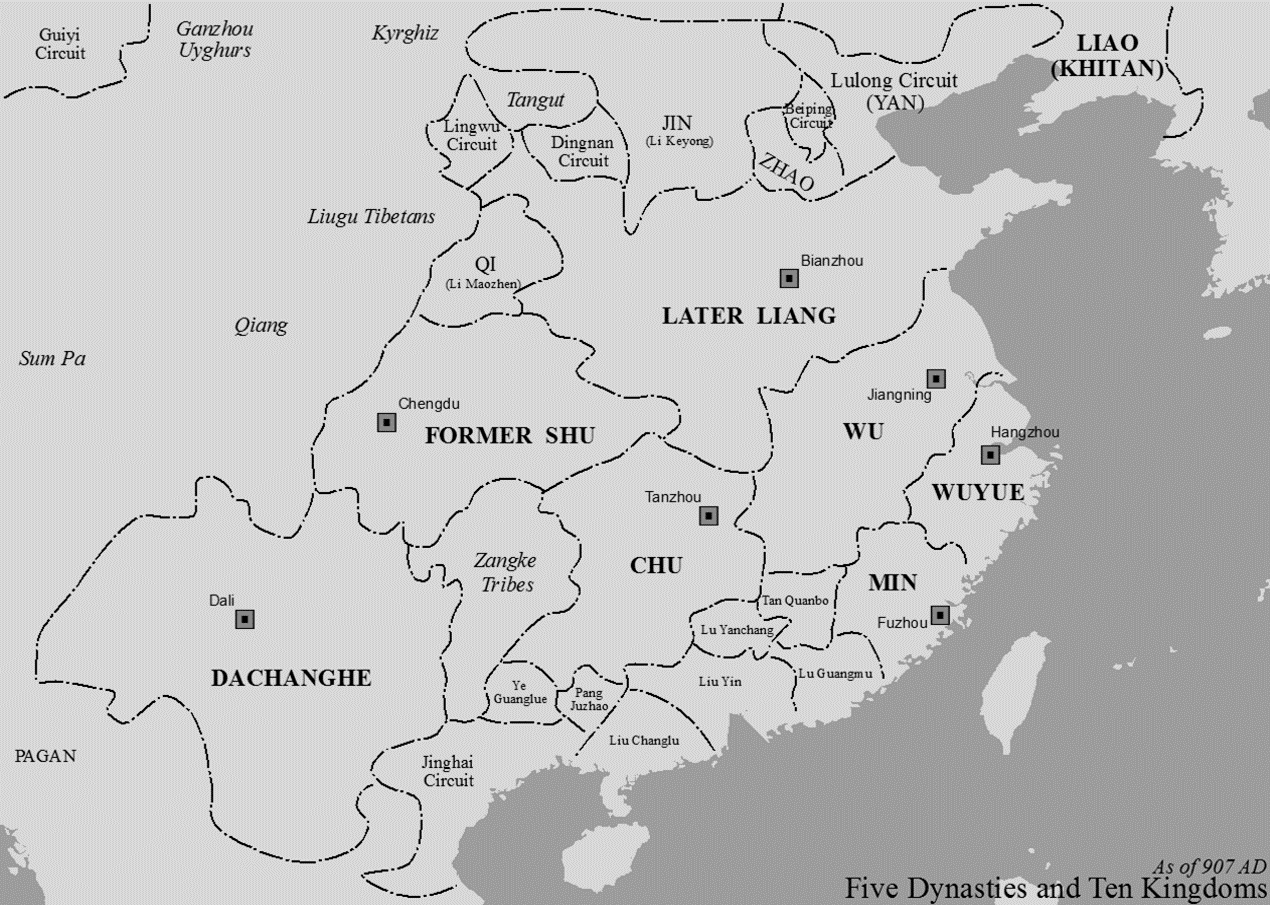
- Map showing the location of Dachanghe
- Capital: Yangjumie (present day Dali)
- Religion: Buddhism
- Government: Monarchy
- History
  - Established: 902
  - Overthrown: 928
Preceded by	Succeeded by
Nanzhao	Datianxing
- Today part of: China; Laos; Myanmar; Vietnam

Dachanghe (Chinese: 大長和; lit. 'Great Long Harmony'), possibly Da Changhe or Changhe, was a monarchy from 902 to 928 in modern Yunnan, China. Founded by Zheng Maisi (鄭買嗣), it was the successor state of Nanzhao (738–902), whose ruling Meng (蒙) family was mass-murdered in a bloody coup by Zheng. The Zheng family suffered a similar fate 26 years later at the hands of Yang Ganzhen (楊干貞), who helped found a state named Datianxing (大天興) (928–929).

Nanzhao's last ruler, Shunhuazhen (r. 897–902), was deposed by the chief minister (buxie), Zheng Maisi. Zheng Maisi was descended from a Tang official named Zheng Hui, who had been captured by Nanzhao in 756 and rose to become Nanzhao's imperial tutor and chief minister. Zheng Maisi changed his name to Zheng Chang and proclaimed a new reign era named Anguo for the Great Changhe Kingdom. Great Changhe portrayed itself as the successor to both the Tang dynasty and Nanzhao. Zhang Maisi's successor, Zheng Renmin (r. 910–927), attacked Former Shu in 914 but suffered a heavy defeat. Renmin sent his grand councillor (buxie), Duan Yizong, to Former Shu, possibly to secure a marriage alliance. In 925, another mission led by the buxie Zheng Zhaochun secured a marriage alliance with Southern Han, whose ruler gave his daughter, the Zengcheng Princess, as wife. After the Later Tang defeated Former Shu and returned thousands of captives to Great Changhe, another marriage alliance mission was sent to Later Tang in 927 which ended unsuccessfully.

== Rulers ==
- Zheng Maisi (鄭買嗣) 903–909
- Zheng Renmin (鄭仁旻) 910–926
- Zheng Longdan (鄭隆亶) 926–927
