= Mawhun, Ann =

Mawhun
- Village
- Location in Burma
- Coordinates: 19°42′N 93°51′E
- Country: Burma
- State: Rakhine State
- District: Kyaukpyu District
- Township: Ann Township
- Time zone: UTC+6.30 (MST)

Mawhun is a village in Ann Township, Kyaukpyu District, in the Rakhine State of southwestern Burma. It is located 13.4 kilometres (8.3 mi) by road south of Dokekan.
