= Piluoge =

Chinese king

Piluoge 皮邏閣
- King of Nanzhao
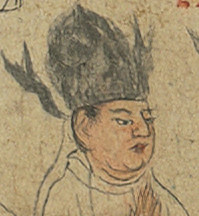

King of Nanzhao
- Reign: 728 – 748
- Predecessor: Shengluopi
- Successor: Geluofeng
- Born: 697
- Died: 748
Names
- Surname: Meng (蒙); Patronymic name: Pi (皮); Given name: Luoge (邏閣)
Posthumous name
- King Guiyi (歸義王)
- Dynasty: Nanzhao

Piluoge (Chinese: 皮邏閣; Classical Yi script: ; Nisu: /pʰi^{33} lo̠^{21} ko̠^{21}/; 697–748), posthumous name King Guiyi (Chinese: 歸義王), was the founder of the Nanzhao kingdom in what is now Yunnan, China. He reigned from 728 or 738 through 748.

== Issue and ancestry ==
Piluoge was the son of Shengluopi and was succeeded by his son Geluofeng.

== See also ==
- Dali City
- Khun Borom
- Nanzhao
- Pyu city-states
- Tang dynasty
