= Nanzhao =

Kingdom in southern China (738–902)

Nanzhao 南詔/南诏 (Chinese) ꂷꏂꌅ (Nuosu / Northern Yi) Mashynzy
- 738–902
- Nanzhao and contemporary Asian polities, circa 800.

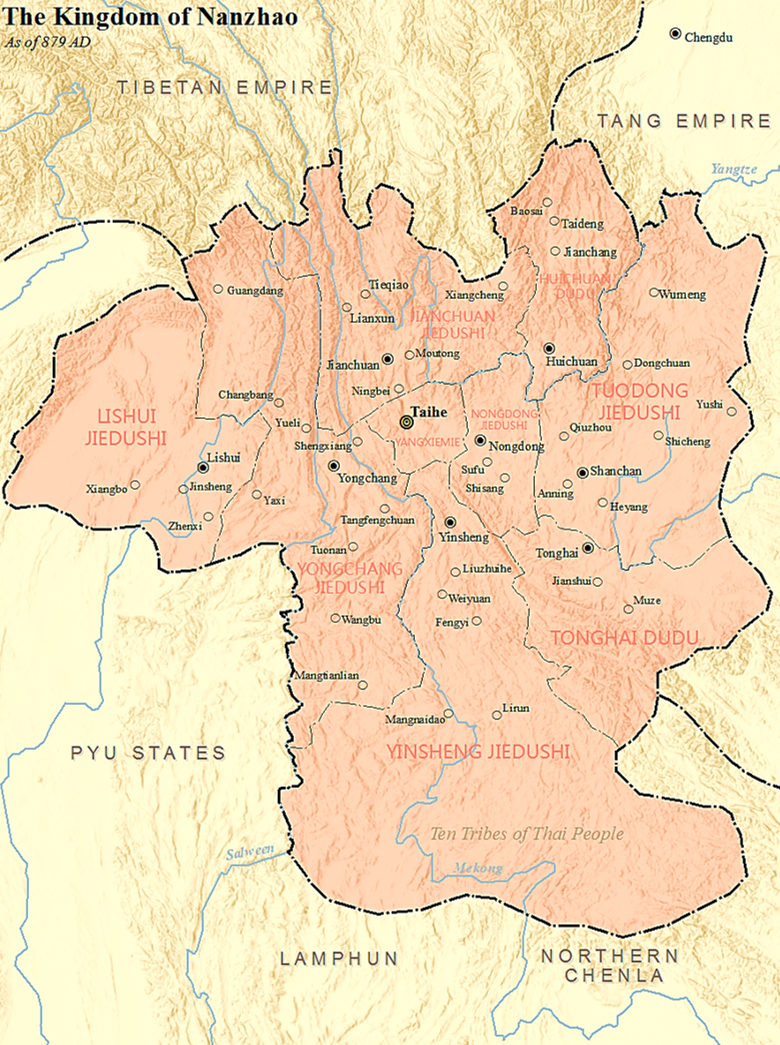
- Kingdom of Nanzhao as of 879 AD
- Status: Kingdom
- Capital: Taihe (before 779); Yangjumie (after 779) (both in present-day Dali City)
- Common languages: Nuosu (elite spoken); Bai (majority spoken); Middle Chinese (literary)
- Religion: Buddhism
- Government: Monarchy
- History
  - Established: 738
  - Overthrown: 902
Preceded by	Succeeded by
Ailao Kingdom; Six Zhao	Dachanghe; Dali Kingdom
- Today part of: China; Laos; Myanmar; Vietnam; Thailand

Nanzhao

Chinese name
- Traditional Chinese: 南詔
- Simplified Chinese: 南诏
Transcriptions
Standard Mandarin
- Hanyu Pinyin: Nánzhào
- Wade–Giles: Nan-chao

Tibetan name
- Tibetan: འཇང་ཡུལ
Transcriptions
- Wylie: ljang yul

Vietnamese name
- Vietnamese: Nam Chiếu; Đại Lễ
- Chữ Hán: 南詔 大禮

Thai name
- Thai: น่านเจ้า
- RTGS: Nanchao

Lao name
- Lao: ໜານເຈົ້າ, ນ່ານເຈົ້າ, ນ່ານເຈົ່າ, ໜອງແສ (/nǎːn.tɕâw, nāːn.tɕâw, nāːn.tɕāw, nɔ̌ːŋ.sɛ̌ː/)

Shan name
- Shan: လၢၼ်ႉၸဝ်ႈ (lâan tsāw)

Nuosu (Northern Yi) name
- Nuosu (Northern Yi): ꂷꏂꌅ (ma'shy'nzy)

Nanzhao (simplified Chinese: 南诏; traditional Chinese: 南詔; pinyin: Nánzhào), also spelled Nanchao (lit. 'Southern Zhao', Yi language: ꂷꏂꌅ, Mashynzy), was a dynastic kingdom that flourished in what is now southwestern China and northern Southeast Asia during the 8th and 9th centuries, during the mid/late Tang dynasty. It was centered on present-day Yunnan in China, with its capitals in modern-day Dali City. The kingdom was officially called Dameng (大蒙) from 738 to 859 AD, Dali (大禮) from 859 to 877 and Dafengmin (大封民) from 877 to 902.

== History ==
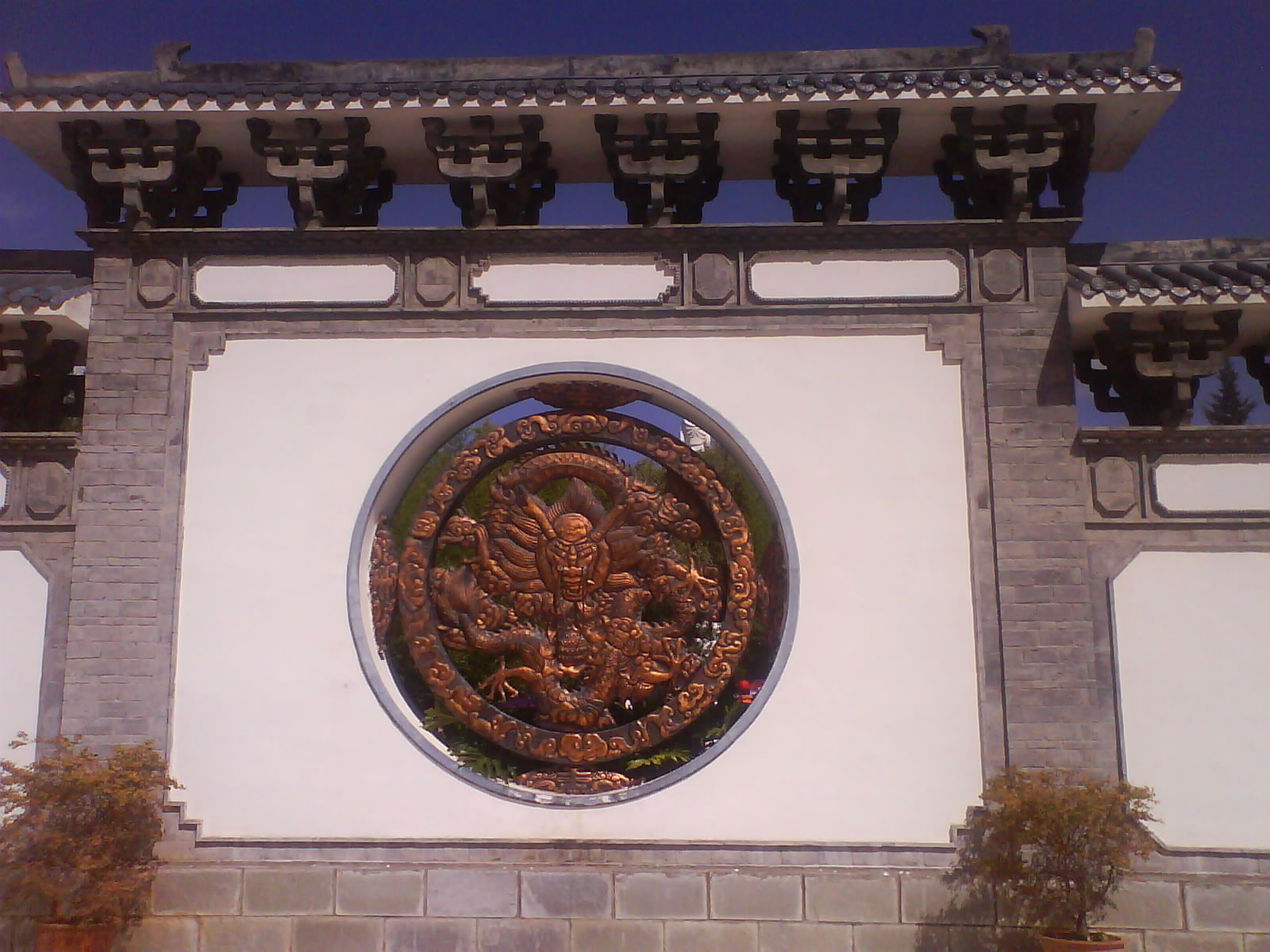
The Nanzhao Dragon on Nanzhao Folklore Island, Erhai Lake, Yunnan

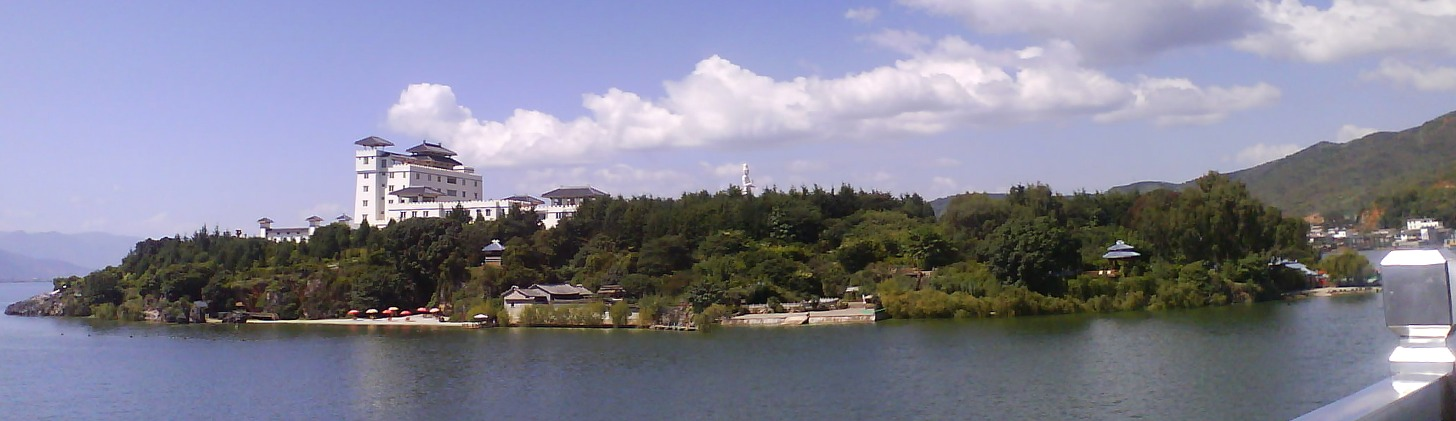
Nanzhao Folklore Island

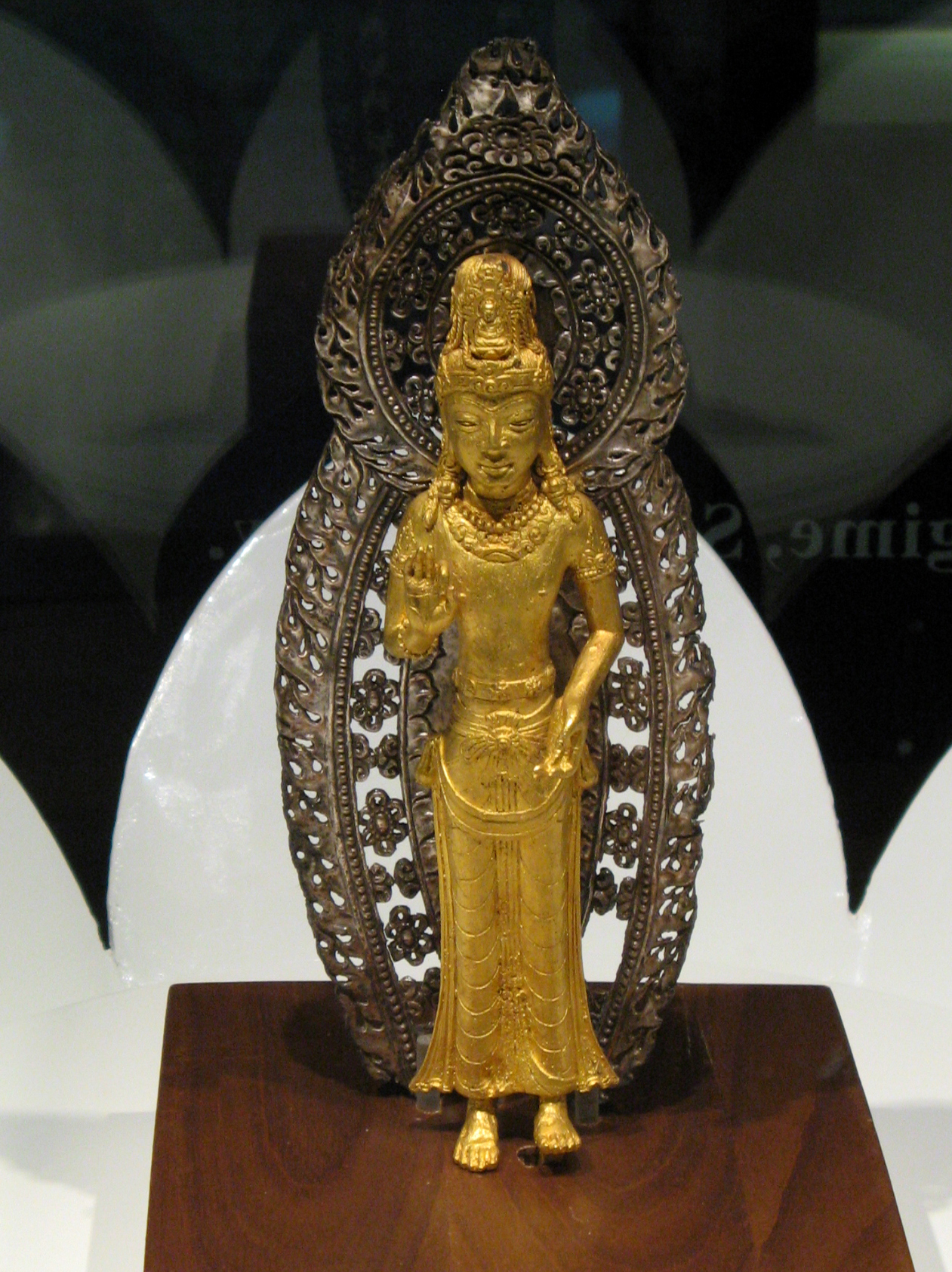
Figure of Guanyin, 9th century, Nanzhao

=== Origins ===
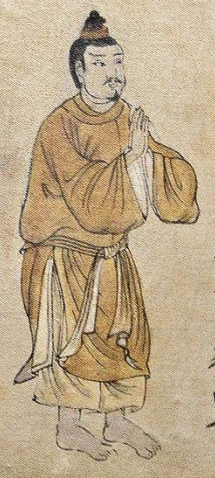
Xinuluo (r. 649-674) from the Nanzhao Tuzhuan (899)

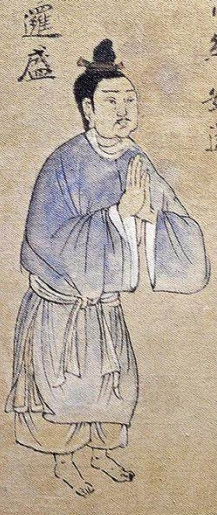
Luoshengyan (r. 674-712) from the Nanzhao Tuzhuan (899)

Nanzhao encompassed many ethnic and linguistic groups. Some historians believe that the majority of the population were the Bai people (then known as the "White Man") and the Yi people (then known as the "Black Man"), but that the elite spoke a variant of Nuosu (also called Yi), a Northern Loloish language. Scriptures unearthed from Nanzhao were written in the Bai language. According to later Nanzhao kings, the polity that would become Nanzhao originated from the Ailao Kingdom, an older tribal confederacy. According to the Chronicles of Huayang, the Ailao Kingdom was populated by the Min Pu (閩濮), Jiu Liao (鳩僚), Piao Yue (僄越), Luo Pu (裸濮) and Shendu (身毒; "Indians") people. Ailao submitted to the Eastern Han dyansty in 69 CE and had 553,711 people.

The Cuanman people came to power in Yunnan during Zhuge Liang's Southern Campaign in 225. By the fourth century they had gained control of the region, but they rebelled against the Sui dynasty in 593 and were destroyed by a retaliatory expedition in 602. The Cuan split into two groups known as the Black and White Mywa. The Sui eventually gave up on the southern region. The White Mywa (Baiman) tribes, who are considered the predecessors of the Bai people, settled on the fertile land of western Yunnan around the alpine fault lake Erhai. The Black Mywa (Wuman), considered to be predecessors of the Yi people, settled in the mountainous regions of eastern Yunnan. These tribes were called Mengshe (蒙舍), Mengxi (蒙嶲), Langqiong (浪穹), Tengtan (邆賧), Shilang (施浪), and Yuexi (越析). Each tribe was known as a zhao. The Tang dynasty sponsored and allied native chiefs to extend its influence into the region. As a result, the eventual Nanzhao Kingdom would later enter an amicable tributary relationship with the Tang.

Among them, Mengshe zhao was recorded as Ma Shizi ( ꂷꏂꌅ ma shy nzy ) in Yi classics, which means "King of Golden Bamboo". Because it is located in the south, Mengshe was called Nanzhao or southern Zhao.

=== Founding ===
In 649, the chieftain of the Mengshe tribe, Xinuluo (細奴邏, Senola), son of Jiadupang and grandson of Shelong, founded the Great Meng (大蒙) and took the title of Qijia Wang (奇嘉王; "Outstanding King"). He acknowledged Tang suzerainty. In 652, Xinuluo absorbed the White Mywa realm of Zhang Lejinqiu, who ruled Erhai Lake and Cang Mountain. This event occurred peacefully as Zhang made way for Xinuluo of his own accord. The agreement was consecrated under an iron pillar in Dali. Thereafter the Black and White Mywa acted as warriors and ministers respectively. In 655, Xinuluo sent his eldest son to Chang'an to ask for the Tang dynasty's protection. The Tang emperor appointed Xinuluo as prefect of Weizhou, sent him an embroidered official robe, and sent troops to defeat rebellious tribes in 672, thus enhancing Xinuluou's position. Xinuluo was succeeded by his son, Luoshengyan, who travelled to Chang'an to make tribute to the Tang. In 704, the Tibetan Empire made the White Mywa tribes into tributaries, whilst subjugating the Black Mywa. In 712, Luoshengyan established a walled city at Yongchang and in 713, Luoshengyan was succeeded by his son, Shengluopi, who was also on good terms with the Tang. He was succeeded by his son, Piluoge, in 733.

Piluoge began expanding his realm in the early 730s. He first annexed the neighboring zhao of Mengsui, whose ruler, Zhaoyuan, was blind. Piluoge supported Zhaoyuan's son, Yuanluo, in his accession, and in turn weakened Mengsui. After Zhaoyuan was assassinated, Piluoge drove Yuanluo from Mengsui and annexed the territory. The remaining zhaos banded together against Piluoge, who thwarted them with an alliance with the Tang dynasty. Not long after 733, the Tang official Yan Zhenghui cooperated with Piluoge in a successful attack on the zhao of Shilang, and rewarded the Mengshe rulers with titles.

Shige/gupi of Shilang was garrisoning the fort of Shihe, which, it will be recalled, was a little East of the present Xiaguan, at the Southern entrance to the Dali Plain. Shilang forces also occupied the fort of Shiqiao at the Southern end of the Tiancang Shan. While Yan Zhenghui and Geluofeng took Shihe and captured Shigepi, Piluoge himself struck at Shiqiao and prevented reinforcements from Shilang from interfering with what appear to have been the main operations. For having occupied Shihe, Piluoge was well placed to attack the Xier He people of the Dali Plain. Once again victory was his, though some of the conquered people managed to escape and make their way North, where they eventually came under the rule of the Jianlang Zhao at Jian Chuan, which will be mentioned in due course.

— M. Blackmore

Two other zhaos also joined in the attack on Shilang: Dengdan ruled by Mieluopi and Langqiong ruled by Duoluowang. Piluoge moved to eliminate these competitors by bribing Wang Yu, the military commissioner of Jiannan (modern Sichuan based in Chengdu) to convince the Tang court to support him in uniting the Six Zhaos. Piluoge then made a surprise attack on Dengdan and defeated the forces of both Mieluopi and the ruler of Shilang, Shiwangqian. The zhao of Yuexi was annexed when its ruler, Bochong, was murdered by his wife's lover, Zhangxunqiu. Zhangxunqiu was summoned by the Tang court and beaten to death. The territory of Yuexi was bestowed to Piluoge. Bochong's son, Yuzeng, fled and resisted Nanzhao's expansion for some time before he was defeated by Piluoge's son, Geluofeng, and drowned in the Changjiang. Piluoge's step-grandson grew jealous of the preeminence of his step-father, Geluofeng, and sought to create his own zhao by allying with the Tibetan Empire. His plans leaked out and he was killed.

In the year 737 AD, Piluoge (皮羅閣) united the Six Zhaos in succession, establishing a new kingdom called Nanzhao (Southern Zhao). In 738, the Tang granted Piluoge the Chinese-style name Meng Guiyi ("return to righteousness") and the title of "Prince of Yunnan". Piluoge set up a new capital at Taihe in 739, (the site of modern-day Taihe village, a few miles south of Dali). Located in the heart of the Erhai valley, the site was ideal: it could be easily defended against attack and it was in the midst of rich farmland. Under the reign of Piluoge, the White Mywa were removed from eastern Yunnan and resettled in the west. The Black and White Mywa were separated to create a more solidified caste system of ministers and warriors.

During the Kaiyuan reign period (713–741), the ruler of Nanzhao, desired to annex the other four polities to create a kingdom, so he invited the four rulers to a banquet to celebrate the xinghui festival 星回節 on the sixteenth day of the twelfth lunar month. He set fire to the building, and then ordered the wives of the four rulers to search for their husband’s bones and take them home. At first, Cishan, the wife of the ruler of Dengdan, could not find the bones of her husband, but she located them by searching for the iron bracelet that [she] asked her husband wear on his arm. The ruler of Nanzhao marvelled at her intelligence and strongly desired to take her as his wife. Cishan replied saying, “I have not buried my deceased husband yet, so how could I dare think of marrying again so quickly?”, and then she shut tight her city gates. The Nanzhao army encircled the city, and all inside died of starvation after three months after completely exhausting their food supplies. [Before dying] Cishan declared, “I am going to report the injustice done to my husband to Heaven (Shangdi 上帝).” Horrified by this, the ruler of Nanzhao repented, and extolled her city as the “source of virtue”.

— An Zixiu

=== Territorial expansion ===
Piluoge died in 748, and was succeeded by his son Geluofeng (閣羅鳳). When the Chinese prefect of Yunnan attempted to rob Nanzhao envoys in 750, Geluofeng launched the Tianbao War against the Tang dynasty, killing the prefect and seizing nearby Chinese territory. In retaliation, the Tang governor of Jiannan (modern Sichuan), Xianyu Zhongtong, attacked Nanzhao with an army of 80,000 soldiers in 751. He was defeated by Duan Jianwei (段俭魏) with heavy losses (many due to disease) at Xiaguan. Duan Jianwei's grave is two kilometres west of Xiaguan, and the Tomb of Ten Thousand Soldiers is located in Tianbao Park. In 754, another Tang army of 100,000 soldiers, led by General Li Mi (李宓), approached the kingdom from the north, but never made it past Mu'ege. By the end of 754, Geluofeng had established an alliance with the Tibetans against the Tang that would last until 794. In the same year, Nanzhao gained control of the salt marshes of Yanyuan County, which it used to regulate the salt to its people, a practice that would continue during the reign of the Dali kingdom. In 756, Nanzhao captured Yuesui Commandery and the Xilu district magistrate Zheng Hui, who went on to serve as Nanzhao's imperial tutor and eventual prime minister.

Geluofeng accepted a Tibetan title and acted as part of the Tibetan Empire. His successor, Yimouxun, continued the pro-Tibetan policy. In 779, Yimouxun participated in a large Tibetan attack on the Tang dynasty. However the burden of having to support every single Tibetan military campaign against the Tang soon weighed on him. In 794, he launched the battle of Shenchuan to break up with Tibet and switched sides to the Tang. In 795, Yimouxun attacked a Tibetan stronghold in Kunming. The Tibetans retaliated in 799 but were repelled by a joint Tang-Nanzhao force. In 801, Nanzhao and Tang forces defeated a contingent of Tibetan and Abbasid slave soldiers in the Battle of Dulu. More than 10,000 Tibetan/Arabs soldiers were killed and some 6,000 were captured. Nanzhao captured seven Tibetan cities and five military garrisons while more than a hundred fortifications were destroyed. This defeat shifted the balance of power in favor of the Tang and Nanzhao.

==== Expanding south ====
Geluofeng also began Nanzhao's shift towards Southeast Asia. He despatched armies to construct the walled city of Guangdang [City of Broad Cleansing] in Dadan [Great Valley] in the Hkamti Long area. The location of Guangdang suggests that it served to prevent the Tibetans from invading and attacking the Pyu city states and threaten Nanzhao from its southeast. However, Dadan faced significant malaria problems and over half the soldiers died within a year. Still, the location was maintained. By 808, the monarch Xungequan started taking on the title of Piaoxin (驃信), meaning Ruler of the Pyu.

Nanzhao expanded into Myanmar, conquering the Pyu city-states in the 820s and destroying the city of Halin in 832. They returned to Halin in 835 and carried off many prisoners. Campaigns against the states of Minuo, Michen, Kunlun, Water Zhenla, and Land Zhenla are mentioned.

==== Attack on Sichuan ====
During the reign of Quanlongcheng (r.809-816), the ruler behaved without constraint, and was killed by Wang Cuodian, a powerful governor. The military generals in Nanzhao had become powerful after the victory in Tibet. Wang Cuodian installed a puppet ruler Quanlisheng. However, Quanlisheng quickly took power back three years later before he was himself replaced by Quanfengyou, with the aid of the generals. Quanfengyou and Wang Cuodian, who remained a powerful general, were instrumental in the expansion of Nanzhao territory.

In 829, Wang Cuodian attacked Chengdu, but withdrew the following year. Wang Cuodian's invasion was not to take Sichuan but to push its territorial boundaries north and take the resources south of Chengdu. The advance of Nanzhao's army was almost unopposed; the attack took advantage of chaos created in Sichuan by its governor, Du Yuanying. Bilateral relations between Nanzhao and Tang became delicate, as Wang Cuodian refused to retreat from Yizhou, saying that Nanzhao had remained a loyal tributary and was only punishing Du Yuanying at the request of Tang soldiers.

In the same year of 830, Nanzhao renewed contact with Tang. The next year, at the request of Li Deyu, Nanzhao released more than four thousand prisoners of war, including Buddhist monks, Daoist priests, and artisans, who had been captured during the Yizhou incident. Frequent visits to Chang’an by Nanzhao delegations followed and continued until the end of Emperor Wuzong’s reign in 846. During these sixteen years, Nanzhao progressed rapidly in state building. Through its students dispatched to Yizhou, Nanzhao borrowed heavily from Tang administrative practice. There was much building of public works and a great expansion of monasteries. Nanzhao also expanded its realm to the Indochina peninsula. They invaded Biaoguo (one of the Pyu city-states, present-day Prome in Upper Burma) in 832 and brought back three thousand prisoners of war; shortly after, in 835, they subdued Michen (near the mouth of the Ayeyarwady River in lower Burma).

— Wang Zhenping

In the 830s, they conquered the neighboring kingdoms of Kunlun to the east and Nuwang to the south. Nanzhao's consolidation placed pressure on the Tang dynasty.

==== Invasion of Annan ====
In 846, Nanzhao raided the southern Tang circuit of Annan. Despite the raid, Nanzhao wished to maintain diplomatic contact with the Tang, but the Tang suspended official ties with Nanzhao in 854 when they refused to accept a Nanzhao envoy bearing a rhinoceros as a gift. Relations with the Tang broke down after the death of Emperor Xuanzong in 859, when the Nanzhao king Shilong treated Tang envoys sent to receive his condolences with contempt, and launched raids on Bozhou and Annan. Shilong proclaimed himself emperor and tried to negotiate a marriage alliance as well as the status of "younger brother" with the Tang dynasty. Shilong also killed Wang Cuodian. To recruit for his wars, Shilong ordered all men over the age 15 to join the army. Anti-Tang locals allied with highland people, who appealed to Nanzhao for help, and as a result invaded the area in 860, briefly taking Songping before being driven out by a Tang army the next year. Prior to Li Hu's arrival, Nanzhao had already seized Bozhou. When Li Hu led an army to retake Bozhou, the Đỗ family gathered 30,000 men, including contingents from Nanzhao to attack the Tang. When Li Hu returned, he learned the Vietnamese rebels and Nanzhao had taken control over Annan out of his hand. In December 860, Songping fell to the rebels and Hu fled to Yongzhou. In summer 861, Li Hu retook Songping but Nanzhao forces moved around and seized Yongzhou. Hu was banished to Hainan island and was replaced by Wang Kuan.

Shilong attacked Annan again in 863, occupying it for three years. With the aid of locals, Nanzhao invaded with an army of 50,000 and besieged Annan's capital Songping in mid-January. On 20 January, the defenders led by Cai Xi killed a hundred of the besiegers. Five days later, Cai Xi captured, tortured, and killed a group of besiegers known as the Púzǐ or Wangjuzi (according to some historians, the Puzi were ancestors of the Wa people. Description about them is indefinite). A local official named Liang Ke was related to them, and defected as a result. On 28 January, a Nanzhao Buddhist monk, possibly from the Indian continent, was wounded by an arrow while strutting to and fro naked outside the southern walls. On 14 February, Cai Xi shot down 200 Wangjuzi and over 30 horses using a mounted crossbow from the walls. By 28 February, most of Cai Xi's followers had perished, and he himself had been wounded several times by arrows and stones. The Nanzhao commander, Yang Sijin, penetrated the inner city. Cai Xi tried to escape by boat, but it capsized midstream, drowning him. The 400 remaining defenders wanted to flee as well, but could not find any boats, so they chose to make a last stand at the eastern gate. Ambushing a group of Nanzhao cavalry, they killed over 2,000 Nanzhao troops and 300 horses before Yang sent reinforcements from the inner city. After taking Songping, Nanzhao laid siege to Junzhou (modern Haiphong). A Nanzhao force of 4,000 men and 2,000 local rebels led by a native chieftain named Zhu Daogu (朱道古) sailed to Junzhou on hundreds of small boats, but they were attacked by a local commander who rammed their vessels and sank 30 boats, drowning them. In total, the invasion destroyed Chinese armies in Annan numbering over 150,000. Although initially welcomed by the locals in ousting Tang control, Nanzhao turned on them, ravaging the local population and countryside. Both Chinese and Vietnamese sources note that the Annanese locals fled to the mountains to avoid destruction.

A government-in-exile for the protectorate was established in Haimen (near modern-day Hạ Long) under the leadership of Song Rong. Ten thousand soldiers from Shandong and all other armies of the Tang empire were called and concentrating at Halong Bay under the command of Kang Chengxin for reconquering Annan. A supply fleet of 1,000 ships from Fujian was organized. In early 864, Song Rong was replaced with Zhang Yin, who was given command of 25,000 soldiers for retaking Annan. however, Kang was engaged in heavy fighting with Nanzhao and Zhang was afraid to advance. Zhang was replaced by Gao Pian in the autumn of 864.

==== Tang counterattack ====
The Tang launched a counterattack in 864 under Gao Pian, a general who had made his reputation fighting the Türks and the Tanguts in the north. In September 865, Gao's 5,000 troops surprised a Nanzhao army of 50,000 while they were scattered about, collecting rice from the villages, and routed them. Gao captured large quantities of rice, which he used to feed his army. A jealous governor, Li Weizhou, accused Gao of stalling to meet the enemy, and reported him to the throne. The court sent another general named Wang Yanqian to replace Gao. In the meantime, Gao had been reinforced by 7,000 men who arrived overland under the command of Wei Zhongzai. In early 866, Gao's 12,000 men defeated a fresh Nanzhao army and chased them back to the mountains. He then laid siege to Songping but had to leave command due to the arrival of Li Weizhou and Wang Yanqian. He was later reinstated after sending his aid, Zeng Gun, who went to the capital as his representative and explained his circumstances. Gao completed the retaking of Annan in fall 866, executing the enemy general, Duan Qiuqian, and beheading 30,000 of his men. Zhu Daogu as well as other rebel leaders were also captured.

According to G. Evans in his final monograph The Tai Original Diaspora, there were probably a quite large number of indigenous Tai-speaking people in Northern Vietnam that threw their support for Nanzhao against the Chinese, and when the Chinese came back in 864, many Tai people were also victims of following Chinese suppression.

==== Siege of Chengdu ====
In 869, Shilong attacked Chengdu with the help of the Dongman tribe. The Dongman used to be an ally of the Tang during their wars against the Tibetan Empire in the 790s. Their service was rewarded with mistreatment by Yu Shizhen, the governor of Xizhou, who kidnapped Dongman tribesmen and sold them to other tribes. When the Nanzhao attacked Xizhou, the Dongman tribe opened the gates and welcomed them in.

The battle for Chengdu was brutal and protracted. Nanzhao soldiers repeatedly assaulted the city with ladder, battering rams. Tang defenders used hooks to immobilise the attackers and set the siege equipment on fire with oil. Lu Dan's hand-picked commandos killed and wounded about 2,000 Nanzhao soldiers. After the frontal assault failed, Nanzhao troops improvised siege equipment from nearby houses and created a "bamboo tank" on logs, hiding inside to dig a tunnel under the walls. Tang soldiers responded by throwing jars with human waste making the cage too foul smelling to stay inside or jars with molten iron to burn up the cage.

The battle lasted for over a month, before the Tang envoy attempted to make peace with Shilong. Lu Dan ceased new operations, and Shilong responded positively. However, Tang soldiers mistakenly thought reinforcements had arrived and opened the city gate to greet them. Instead, they found the Nanzhao troops who thought it was a surprise attack, and fighting resumed. This confusion broke off the planned peace visits, with the Tang believing that Nanzhao was deceitful and Nanzhao believing Tang was not sincere. Eventually on the second month of the siege, Tang Jiannan East Circuit military governor Yan Qingfu arrived with actual reinforcements. Despite Shilong's attempts to divert forces to intercept them, the Nanzhao soldiers were crushed by the Tang forces, with five thousand casualties and the rest fleeing into the mountains. Shilong attempted to make peace, but with a clear disadvantage, he was unable to capture the city before the Tang forces converged on Chengdu. Shilong then aborted his campaign.

Nanzhao invaded again in the winter of 873-874 and reached within 70 km of Chengdu, seizing Qiongzhou and raiding Qianzhong prefecture (modern Pengshui) before retreating. They attacked again soon after and looted the suburbs of Chengdu for three days but failed to breach its gates and retreated.

Your ancestor once served the Tibetans as a slave. The Tibetans should be your foes. Instead you have turned yourself into a Tibetan subject. How could you not even differentiate kindness from enmity? As for the hall of the former Lord of Shu, it is a treasure from the previous dynasty, not a place suitable for occupancy by you remote barbarians. [Your aggression] has angered the deities as well as the common people. Your days are numbered!

— Niu Cong, military governor of Chengdu, in response to the Nanzhao invasion of 873

==== End of territorial expansion ====
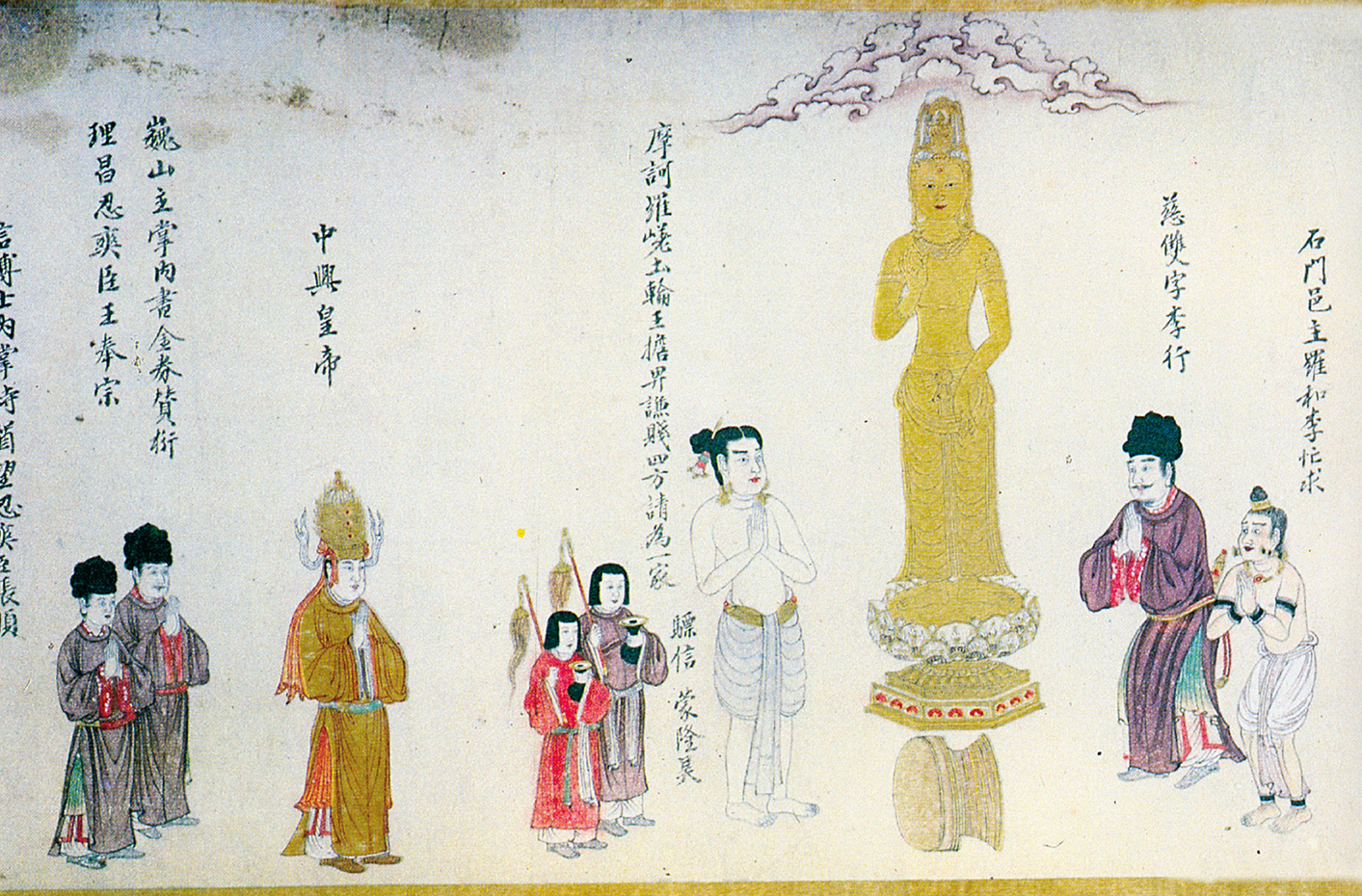
Nanzhao Buddhists and the emperor praying to Auocye Guanyin in the Nanzhao tuzhuan (899)

In 875, Gao Pian was appointed by the Tang to lead defenses against Nanzhao. He ordered all the refugees in Chengdu to return home. Gao led a force of 5,000 and chased the remaining Nanzhao troops to the Dadu River where he defeated them in a decisive battle, captured their armored horses, and executed 50 tribal leaders. He proposed to the court an invasion of Nanzhao with 60,000 troops. His proposal was rejected. Nanzhao forces were driven from the Bozhou region, modern Guizhou, in 877 by a local military force organized by the Yang family from Shanxi. This effectively ended Nanzhao's expansionist campaigns. Shilong died in 877.

From Emperor Yizong’s time [r. 860–874], the barbarians [i.e., Nanzhao] sacked Annan and Yongzhou twice, marched into Qianzhong [southern Guizhou] once, and raided Xichuan [southern Sichuan] four times. Over these fifteen years, recruiting soldiers for and transporting supplies to [troops on the frontiers] have exhausted the entire country. As the lion’s share of taxes did not reach the capital [but were diverted to the frontier troops], the [imperial] treasury and the palace storehouses were emptied. Soldiers died of tropical diseases. Poverty turned commoners into robbers and thieves. Land in central China lay waste. This is all due to the war with Nanzhao.

— Lu Xie, Chancellor of the Tang dynasty, 880

=== Decline ===
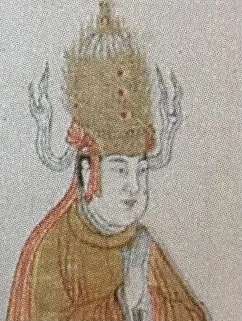
Shunhuazhen (r. 897-902) from the Nanzhao Tuzhuan (899)

Shilong's successor, Longshun, entered negotiations with the Tang for a marriage alliance, which was agreed to in 880. The marriage alliance never came to fruition owing to the Huang Chao rebellion. By the end of 880 the rebels had taken Luoyang and seized the Tong Pass. Longshun did not give up on the marriage however. In 883 he sent a delegation to Chengdu to fetch the Princess of Anhua. They brought with them one hundred rugs and carpets as betrothal gifts. The Nanzhao delegation was detained for two years due to a dispute in ceremony and failed to bring back the princess. In 897 Longshun was murdered by one of his own ministers. His successor, Shunhua, sent envoys to the Tang requesting restoration of friendly relations, but by this time the Tang emperor was merely a puppet figurehead of more powerful military governors. No response returned. The Nanzhao tuzhuan scroll painting was commissioned by Nanzhao's officials to answer Shunhua's question of how Buddhism entered Nanzhao. The scroll painting's narrative ends with Longshun worshiping a golden statue of Acuoye Guanyin. The scroll identifies the ruler as "Maharaja, Earth Wheel King, danbi qianjian, Who Invites The Four Directions to Become One Family, the Piaoxin Meng Longhao". "Maharaja, Earth Wheel King" refers to Buddhist rulership, "Piaoxin" means ruler of the Pyu city-states, and the Four Directions refer to the four seas of classical Chinese texts. The scroll depicts Longshun undergoing abhiseka (consecration), which typically involved being sprinkled with water from a basin, stating that the event occurred in 897.

In 902, the dynasty came to a bloody end when the chief minister (buxie), Zheng Maisi, murdered the royal family and usurped the throne, renaming it to Dachanghe (大長和, 902–928). In 928, a White Mywa noble, Yang Ganzhen (Jianchuan Jiedushi), aided the chief minister, Zhao Shanzheng, in overthrowing the Zheng family and establishing Datianxing (大天興, 928–929). The new regime lasted only a year before Zhao was killed by Yang, who created Dayining (大義寧, 929–937). Finally Duan Siping seized power in 937 and established the Dali Kingdom.

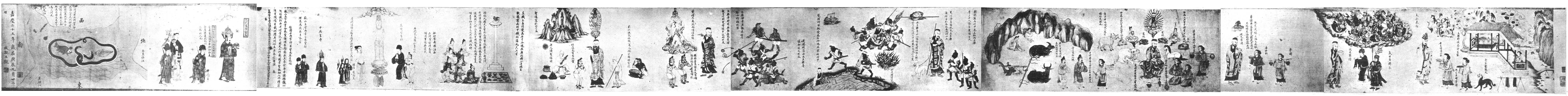
Nanzhao tuzhuan, black and white, 12th-13th century copy

== Military ==
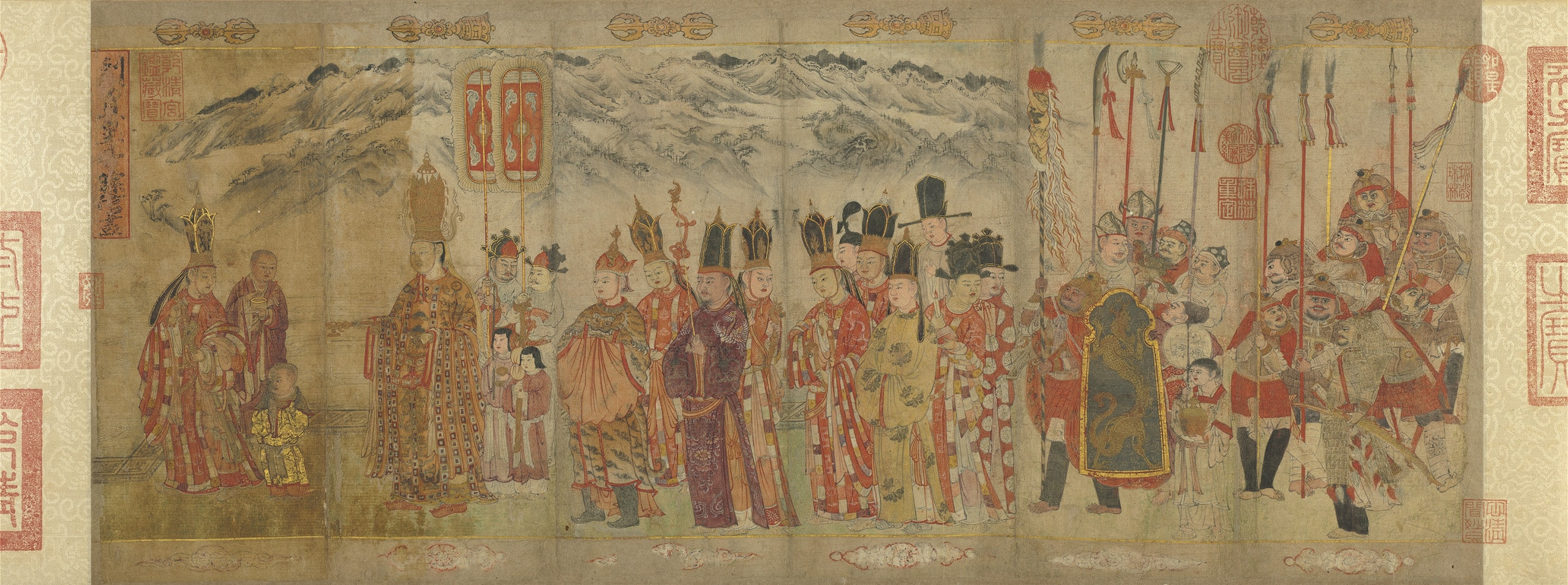
Section of Zhang Shengwen's Kingdom of Dali Buddhist Volume of Paintings. Bare-footed warriors, possibly the Luojuzi on the right.

Nanzhao had an elite vanguard unit called the Luojuzi, which means tiger sons, that served as full-time soldiers. For every hundred soldiers, the strongest one was chosen for service in the Luojuzi. They were outfitted with red helmets, leather armour, and bronze shields, but went barefoot. Only wounds to the front were allowed and if they suffered any wounds to their back, they were executed. The commander of a hundred Luojuzi was called Luojuzuo. The king's personal guards, known as the Zhunu Quju, were recruited from the Luojuzi. "Quju" is a type of belt. Other types of Quju are known, such as Golden Quju. "Zhunu" in Chinese means "red crossbow".

Picked from troops raised from the countryside, the Luojuzi formed four armies. They wore vermilion helmets, bore rhinoceros hide bronze shields, and went barefoot. They ran into danger as though flying.

— New Book of Tang, Nanman Chapter, Nanzhao First Half

== Government ==
Nanzhao society was separated into two distinct castes: the administrative White Mywa living in western Yunnan, and the militaristic Black Mywa in eastern Yunnan. The rulers of Nanzhao were from the Mengshe tribe of the Black Mywa. Nanzhao modelled its government on the Tang dynasty with ministries (nine instead of six) and imperial examinations. However the system of governance and rule in Nanzhao was essentially feudal. The King of Nanzhao relied on a council of chief ministers and generals called the Qingping guan (清平官). These councillors also served as regional administrative heads with a six-way division mirroring the Tang's Six Ministries system. Nanzhao's mode of governance has been described as combining Sinitic bureaucracy with Southeast Asian-style alliances of allegiance with local leaders. Some historians identify Nanzhao as a classical Southeast Asian polity due to being an early Buddhist kingdom that led military campaigns into the Pyu city states and Annam. However, the Nanzhao rulers did not employ Southeast Asian ideologies of kingship. As Nanzhao grew in power and expanded their influence south, they increasingly became a rival to the Tang, rather than a frontier vassal. This included competition over frontiers between the two, such as Guizhou and Guangxi.

Sons of the Nanzhao aristocracy visited the Tang capital, Chang'an, to receive a Chinese education. Young men in Nanzhao also visited Chengdu for their education, even during times when the two states were in military conflict. Chinese influence on Nanzhao can be seen in the 766 Dehua Stele, which the Nanzhao elite used to depict their state as Sinitic following classical Chinese tradition. Confucian influence declined during the reign of Shilong (r. 859-77) when he proclaimed himself emperor and reoriented Nanzhao around Buddhism as the ruling ideology and religion. Ten of the thirteen kings of Nanzhao accepted various imperial titles from the Tang.

Sources that believe Nanzhao was a Yi dominated society also traditionally hold it to be a slave society because of how central the institution was to Yi culture. The prevalence of the slave culture was so great that sometimes children were named after the quality and quantity of slaves they owned or their parents wished to own. For example: Lurbbu (many slaves), Lurda (strong slaves), Lurshy (commander of slaves), Lurnji (origin of slaves), Lurpo (slave lord), Lurha, (hundred slaves), Jjinu (lots of slaves).

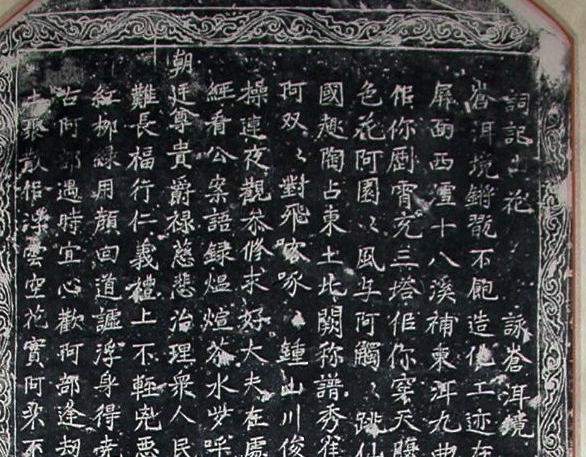
A poem written in Square Bai script on the Shanhua tablet (山花碑), 15th c.

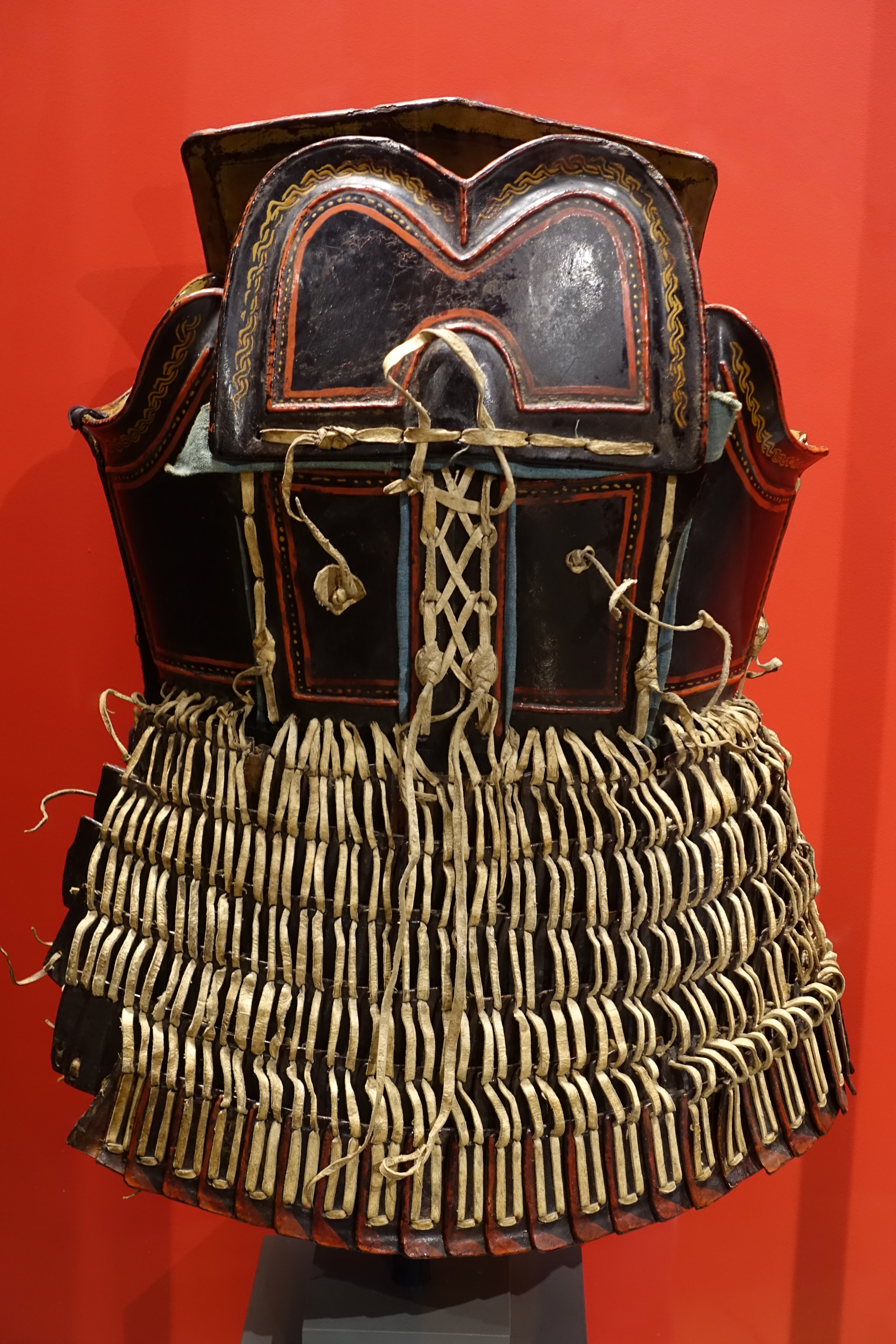
Armour of the Yi people, made of leather, wood, and hide, Qing dynasty

== Economy ==
The Lake Erhai region that formed the core of the Nanzhao territory strategically allowed Nanzaho to regulate and conduct overland trade between China, India and Southeast Asia. Historian Yumio Sakurai described Nanzhao as a "trade route controlling state". The fertile land near Lake Erhai and Lake Dian also created an agrarian base for the Nanzhao Kingdom. It established walled cities into Southeast Asia to expand its trade dominace, such as the walled city of Yongchang on the Upper Irrawaddy River. They controlled the Upper Irrawaddy and its various tribes by constructing walled cities organised into five circuits to exert control and keep trade routes open. Their control of the region secured overland routes into India using the rivers for transportation Nanzhao developed communication between this core region and its regional administrative points to control trade and administer itself as a hub heading southwest from China. Nanzhao saw itself as the furthest point of Sinitic control connecting to the non-Sinitic world on the other side of the Mekong River.

How broad the de of the Han,
Civilising those who do not submit.
Passing over the Bonan Mountains,
We negotiate the Lanjin crossing.
After traversing the Mekong,
We enter [the lands] of other peoples.

— c. 5th century CE Yunnan ballad, "Lancang Ge",

Nanzhao's expansion into the Upper Irrawaddy also provided access to natural resource extraction, particularly gold mining. Criminals from Nanzhao's core were sent to pan for alluvial gold in the region. In 814, Nanzhao also exerted their influence to relocate two to three thousand people from the Lower Irrawaddy Kingdom of "Michen" (弥诺国) to mine gold in the Upper Irrawaddy.

== Language ==
Extant sources from Nanzhao and the later Dali Kingdom show that the ruling elite used Chinese script. Scriptures from Nanzhao unearthed in the 1950s show that it was written in the Bai language but Nanzhao does not seem to have ever attempted to standardize or popularize the script.

The Nanzhao rulers use what has been described as a father-son patronymic naming system found in Yi culture and Tibeto-Burman traditions. According to the popular conception of the Yi patronymic naming system, the last character of the father's name transfers to become the first character of the son's name. The last character of the son's name is then used as the first character of the grandson's name. However this is not strictly a name per se but rather a shortening of the genealogical system which links the father and son across generations. A complete Yi name is composed of the clan name, the branch clan name, the father's name, and the person's own name (ex. Aho Bbujji Jjiha Lomusse). Aho is the name of a tribe, Bbuji is the name of a clan, Jjiha is the father's name, and Lomusse is a personal name. The name therefore means Lomusse the son of Jjiha of the Bbujji clan of the Aho tribe. Within the clan he would just be called Lomusse and within the tribe he would be called Jjiha Lomusse. Yi names use the suffixes -sse and -mo to express maleness and femaleness respectively. When the genealogy of a person is recited, only the father-son linkage is used to make it easier: Aho Ddezze—Ddezze Zuluo—Zuluo Jjiha—Jjiha Lomusse—Lomu Shuogge. This caused the assumption that the Yi practiced a father-son linkage system when it was actually a traditional genealogical recitation pattern.

The names of Nanzhao rulers have been transcribed according to this system with the first character representing the father's name:

- (Xi)nuluo
- (Luo)sheng
- (Sheng)luopi
- (Pi)luoge
- (Ge)luofeng
- (Feng)jiayi
- (Yi)mouxun
- (Xun)gequan
- (Quan)fengyou – sought to imitate Chinese practices and only went by Fengyou; broke tradition and named his son Shilong
- Shilong
- (Long)shun
- (Shun)huazhen

Leading families around the Nanzhao capital adopted Chinese surnames such as Yang, Li, Zhao, Dong, and claimed Han Chinese ancestry; however, the rulers instead presented themselves as Ailao descendants from Yongchang.

== Ethnicity ==
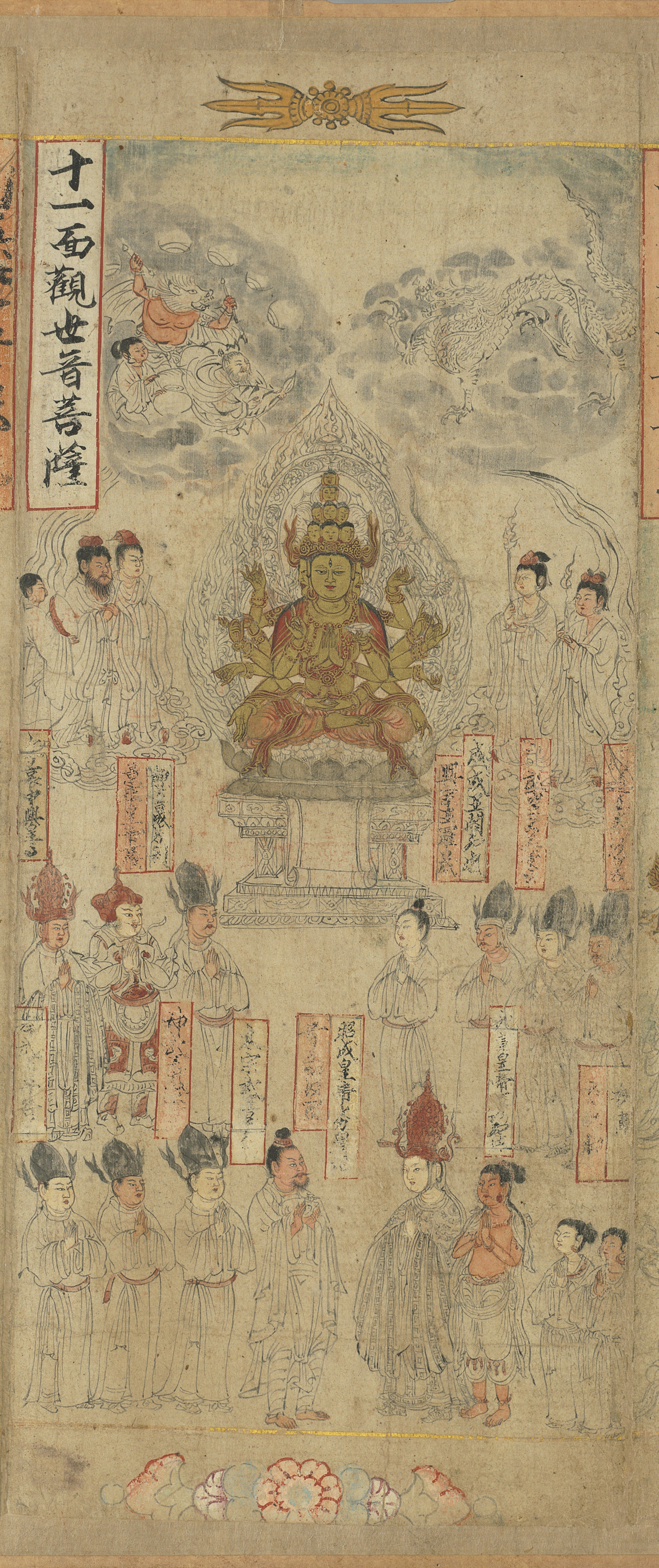
The Nanzhao emperors performing Buddhist rites, Dali Kingdom, 12th century

Nanzhao had a variety of ethnic groups, with its core area being divided between "Wuman" (black barbarian) and "Baiman" (white barbarian). The ruling class were mostly Wuman while the majority were the more sinicised Baiman people. The Baiman leaders were given special titles and recognition. In academia, the ethnic composition of the Nanzhao kingdom's population has been debated for a century. Some non-Chinese scholars subscribed to the theory that the Tai ethnic group was a major component and later moved south into modern-day Thailand and Laos. Chinese scholars tended to associate Nanzaho with the modern Bai people.

=== Bai and Yi ===
The ethnicity of Nanzhao's ruling elite is not clear. Both the Yi people and Bai people in modern Yunnan claim descent from Nanzhao's rulers.

In the histories of the Period of Division (311–589), as well as the Cuan kingdoms of the Sui-Tang period (581–907), are thought to have been ruled by the ancestors of today’s Yi, and at least one faction in an ongoing debate considers the Nanzhao kingdom, which ruled Yunnan and surrounding areas after 740, to have been a Yi-dominated polity.

— Stevan Harrell

In Weishan Yi and Hui Autonomous County, the Yi people claim direct descent from Xinuluo, the founder of Mengshe (Nanzhao).

... the ethnic identity of the Nanzhao rulers is still a matter for lively discussion (see Qi 1987), and the Yunnan origin of the Yi is disputed by those who think they came from the Northwest. With regard to the latter issue, a recent article by Chen Tianjun (1985) demonstrates even more clearly than Ma Changshou's book the power of the five-stage and Morganian historical schemes. According to Chen, the origin of the Yi goes back further, to the San Miao of classical History, who were always fighting against the Xia dynasty (C.2200-1600 B.C.E.).

— Stevan Harrell

The Bai people also trace their ancestry to Nanzhao and the Dali Kingdom, but records from those kingdoms do not mention Bai. "Bai barbarians" or "Bo people" were mentioned during the Tang dynasty and it is suspected that they might be the same name using different transcriptions; Bai and Bo were pronounced Baek and Bwok in the Tang period. The name Bo was first cited in the Lüshi Chunqiu (c. 241 and 238 BC) and appeared again in the Records of the Grand Historian (begun in 104 BC). The earliest references to "Bai people", or the "Bo", in connection to the people of Yunnan are from the Yuan dynasty. A Bai script using Chinese characters was mentioned during the Ming dynasty. Scriptures dated to the Nanzhao period used the Bai language. According to Stevan Harrell, while the ethnic identity of Nanzhao's ruling elite is still disputed, the subsequent Yang and Duan dynasties were both definitely Bai. According to Christian Daniels, the Bai ethnic identity was more significantly formed much later in the 13th century after they were conquered by the Ming dynasty or at the end of the Dali Kingdom.

=== Forced migrations ===
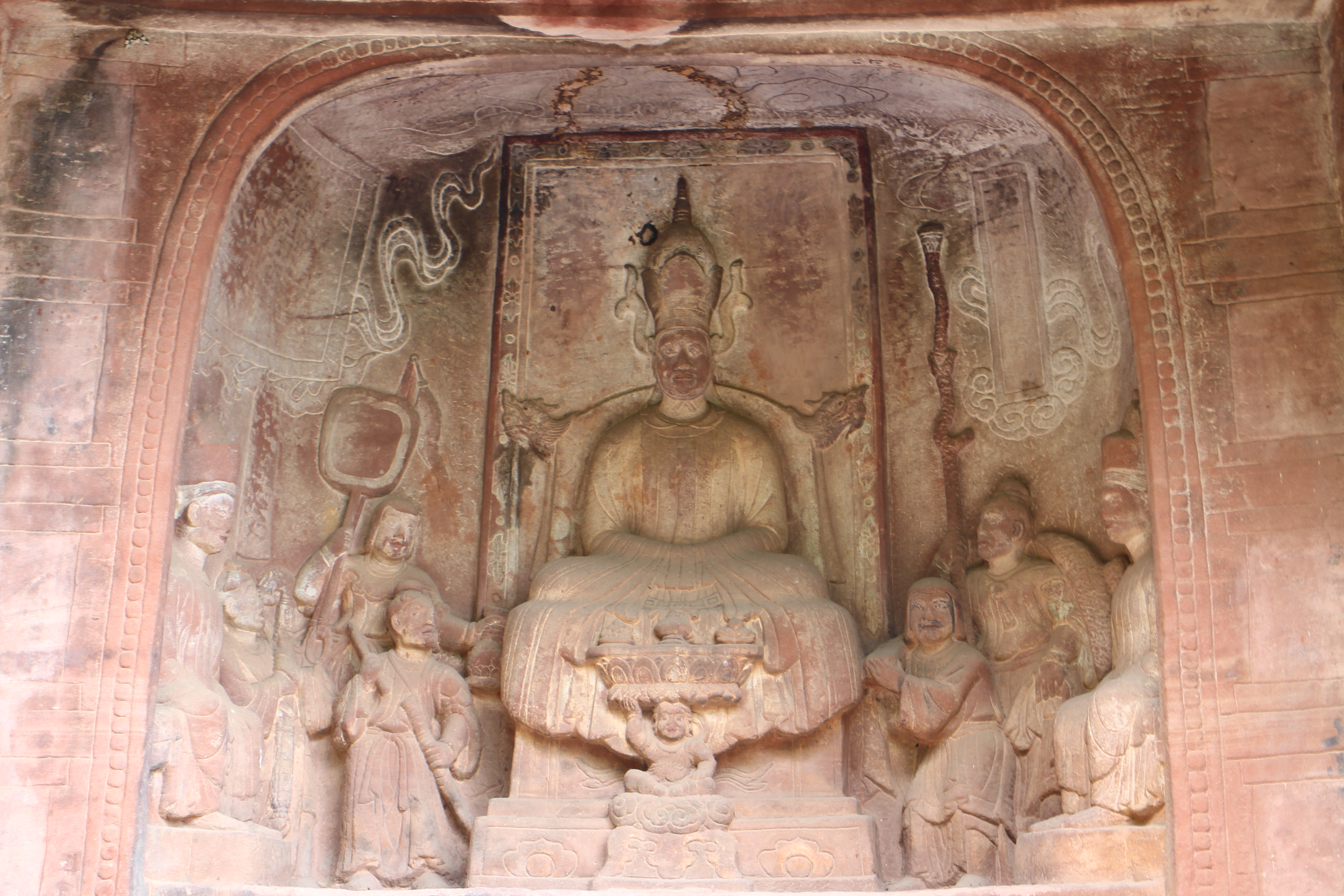
Carving of Yimouxun (r. 779-808) from the Shizhongshan Grottoes in Jianchuan County

The Nanzhao kings Piluoge, Geluofeng and Yimouxun were most aggressive in enacting forced migration. By expelling people in conquered areas, they reduced the risk of rebellion and helped redistribute their demographic bases. The force migrations further strengthened their military and was important in Nanzhao's ability to expand their territory into Southeast Asia.

The Nanzhao king Yimouxun (r. 779-808) conducted forced resettlement of several ethnicities.

Before the early Ming, northwest Yunnan was mainly populated by non-Han ethnic peoples. Ethnic peoples recorded as residing in mountainous or semimountainous parts of Beisheng sub-prefecture included the Boren 僰人, Mosuo man 摩些蠻, Lisuo 栗些, Xifan 西番, Baiman 白蠻, Luoluo 羅羅 and Echang 峨昌. In addition, reportedly, seven ethnic groups, i.e., the Baiman, Luoluo, Mosuo, Dongmen 冬門, Xunding 尋丁 and Echang, were forcibly moved here from the Kunmi River 昆彌河 (today’s Miju River 彌苴河 in Dengchuan) by Nanzhao King Yimouxun 異牟尋 (reigned 779–808).

— Huang Caiwen

Beisheng originally formed part of the territory occupied by an ethnic group known to Chinese dynasties as the Shi barbarians (Shiman 施蠻). The Nanzhao King, Yimouxun 異牟尋 (reigned 779–808), opened the area during the Zhenyuan period (785 to 804) of the Tang and named it Beifang Dan 北方賧. Yimouxun forcibly moved the White Barbarians (Baiman 白蠻) of the Mi River 瀰河 together with other peoples, such as the Luoluo 羅落 and Mosuo 麽些, to populate the region and then renamed it Chengji Dan 成偈賧 (later Shanju prefecture 善巨郡)... The Duan family 段氏 of the Dali kingdom changed the name to Chengji Zhen 成紀鎮 in 1048 (Qingli 8) and appointed Gao Dahui 高大惠 to govern...

— Huang Caiwen

The southwest region also saw resettlement of Tang colonists. In 664, soldiers were sent by the Tang court to attempt to settle and exert influence over Nanzhao. During the subsequent wars, about 200,000 soldiers total were sent to Nanzhao over the course of two centuries with most failing to return. Those that did not die were variously resettled by Nanzhao or sold as slaves. Nanzhao raids into their frontier borders with China also brought back many Han Chinese slaves. Beyond, resettlement that happened due to war, Han Chinese fleeing famine, war or the Tang state also resettled in Nanzhao.

=== Bamar ===
Nanzhao's invasions of the Pyu city-states brought with them the Bamar people (Burmese people), who originally lived in present-day Qinghai and Gansu. The Bamar would form the Pagan Kingdom in medieval Myanmar. In 849, a fortified settlement was established along the Irrawaddy River, possibly to help Nanzhao pacify the area. It was situated at the confluence of the Irrawaddy and the Chindwin tributary to the west of an irrigated rice plain.

According to Burmese chronicles, after the Nanzhao invasions, a semi-mythical warrior-king named Pyusawhti arose. He was a giant and an excellent archer who came to Pagan and defeated a great bird, a great boar, a great tiger, and a flying squirrel. Legendary accounts say he was born from the union of a prince of the sun and a dragon egg or that he was a scion of the Shakya lineage of Tagaung. It is speculated that he was connected to the ruling dynasty of Nanzhao in some way due to practicing the same naming system. Pyusawhti and his descendants for seven generations used the same patronymic naming tradition that the Nanzhao kings practiced: the last part of a father's name is used as the first part of the son's name. It is also said that Pyusawhti achieved victory over the Chinese, which likely refers to Nanzhao defeating the Tang dynasty in a battle that Pyusawhti may have participated in.

=== Mon-Khmer groups ===
Nanzhao also governed some distinct Mon-Khmer language speaking groups. The Puzi were an ethnic group in the Ailao Kingdom prior to the Nanzhao Kingdom and was therefore recognised within the core of the Nanzhao state as "superior chieftaians". The Puzi lived further north than other Mon-Khmer groups and had an established independent polity known in Chinese as Qingdian (慶甸), which was conquered by the Yuan dynasty in the 14th century. The Puzi later gave rise to the modern Wa, Palaung and Bulang people.

At the southernmost parts of the Nanzhao territory were various other Mon-Khmer groups including the Heichi, Jinchi and Mang Man people. Earlier historians associated these groups with the Tai peoples, but relied on superimposing modern ethnic distributions onto the geographies of these groups. The Mang Man had a state called Mangzhao between the River and the Mekong rivers in the 8th century before it was defeated by King Yimouxun in 794 CE, well before Tai migration into the area.

== Religion ==
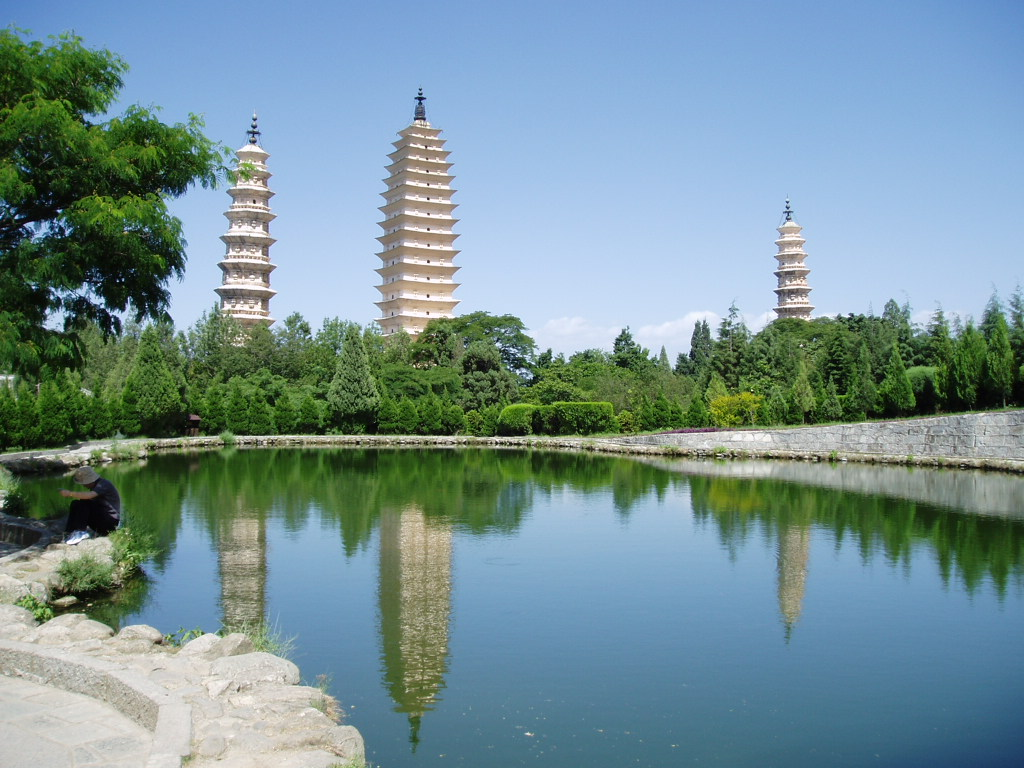
The Three Pagodas, built by King Quan Fengyou (劝丰佑) of Nanzhao

Modern symbol for Bimoism

=== Benzhuism ===
Almost nothing is known about pre-Buddhist religion in Nanzhao. According to Yuan dynasty sources, the Bai people practiced an indigenous religion called Benzhuism that worshiped local lords and deities. The Benzhu lords are spirits of people that died under special circumstances and are not hierarchically organized. Archaeological findings in Yunnan suggest that animal and human sacrifices were offered to the Benzhu lords around a metal pillar with the aid of bronze drums in return for wealth and health. The use of iron pillars for rituals seems to have been retained into the Dali Kingdom. The Nanzhao tuzhuan shows offerings to heaven occurring around one. The Bai people have female shamans and share a worship of white stones similar to the Qiang people.

=== Bimoism ===
Bimoism is the ethnic religion of the Yi people. The religion is named after the Shaman-priests known as bimo, which means 'master of scriptures', who officiate at births, funerals, weddings and holidays. One can become bimo by patrilinial descent after a time of apprenticeship or formally acknowledging an old bimo as the teacher. A lesser priest known as suni is elected, but bimo are more revered and can read Yi scripts while suni cannot. Both can perform rituals, but only bimo can perform rituals linked to death. For most cases, suni only perform some exorcism to cure diseases. Generally, suni can only be from humble civil birth while bimo can be of both aristocratic and humble families.

The Yi worshiped and deified their ancestors similar to the Chinese folk religion, and also worshiped gods of nature: fire, hills, trees, rocks, water, earth, sky, wind and forests. Bimoists also worship dragons, believed to be protectors from bad spirits that cause illness, poor harvests and other misfortunes. Bimoists believe in multiple souls. At death, one soul remains to watch the grave while the other is eventually reincarnated into some living form. After someone dies they sacrifice a pig or sheep at the doorway to maintain relationship with the deceased spirit.

=== Buddhism ===
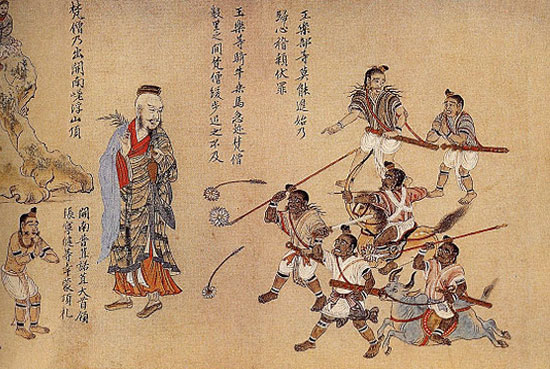
Extract of Nanzhao Tujuan scroll - the Nanzhao Buddhists are depicted as light skinned whereas the non-Buddhists are depicted as rebellious short brown people

Buddhism practiced in Nanzhao and the Dali Kingdom was known as Azhali (Acharya), founded around 821-824 by a monk from India called Li Xian Maishun. More monks from India arrived in 825 and 828 and built a temple in Heqing. In 839, an acharya named Candragupta entered Nanzhao. Quanfengyou appointed him as a state mentor and married his sister Yueying to Candragupta. It was said that he meditated in a thatched cottage of Fengding Mountain in the east of Heqing, and became an "enlightened God." He established an altar to propagate tantric doctrines in Changdong Mountain of Tengchong. Candragupta continued to propagate tantric doctrines, translated the tantric scripture The Rites of the Great Consecration, and engaged in water conservancy projects. He left for his homeland later on and possibly went to Tibet to propagate his teachings. When he returned to Nanzhao, he built Wuwei Temple.

In 851, an inscription in Jianchuan dedicated images to Maitreya and Amitabha. The Nanzhao king Quanfengyou commissioned Chinese architects from the Tang dynasty to build the Three Pagodas. The last king of Nanzhao established Buddhism as the official state religion. In the Nanzhao Tushu juan, the Nanzhao Buddhist elite are depicted with light skin whereas the people who oppose Buddhism are depicted as short and dark skinned. The 899 Nanzhao tuzhuan gives depicts and recounts how the Acuoye Guanyin helped found Nanzhao.

The Three Pagoda Temple 三塔寺 controlled the Ranggong Chapel 讓公庵, which the Gao family constructed during the Nanzhao kingdom period. Friends of the famous Neo-Confucian scholar Li Yuanyang 李元陽 (1497–1580) supported the chapel by donating funds to buy farm land for its maintenance as late as the Jiajing reign period (1522–1566). According to tradition, seven holy monks 聖僧 constructed Biaoleng Temple during the Nanzhao kingdom period. A stele dated 1430 (Xuande 5) records that Zhao Yanzhen 趙彥貞 from a local family of officials renovated Longhua Temple (flourished during the Nanzhao to Dali kingdom periods) after its destruction by the Ming army.

— Jianxiong Ma

Azhali is considered a sect of Tantrism or esoteric Buddhism, which continued to be practiced in Nanzhao's successor states, the Changhe (903-27), Tianxing (927-28), Yining (928-37), and Dali kingdoms. Acharya itself means guru or teacher in Sanskrit. According to Azhali practices among the Bai people, acharyas were allowed to marry and have children. The position of acharya was hereditary. The acharyas became state mentors in Nanzhao and held great influence until the Mongol conquest of China in the 13th century, during which the acharyas called upon various peoples to resist the Mongol rulers and later the Chinese during the Ming conquest of Yunnan. Zhu Yuanzhang banned the dissemination of Azhali Buddhism for a time before setting up an office to administer the religion.

The area had a strong connection with Tantric Buddhism, which has survived to this day at Jianchuan and neighboring areas. The worship of Guanyin and Mahākāla is very different from other forms of Chinese Buddhism. Nanzhao likely had strong religious connections with the Pagan Kingdom in what is today Myanmar, as well as Tibet and Bengal (see Pala Empire).

== Gallery of Nanzhao rulers from the Kingdom of Dali Buddhist Volume of Paintings ==
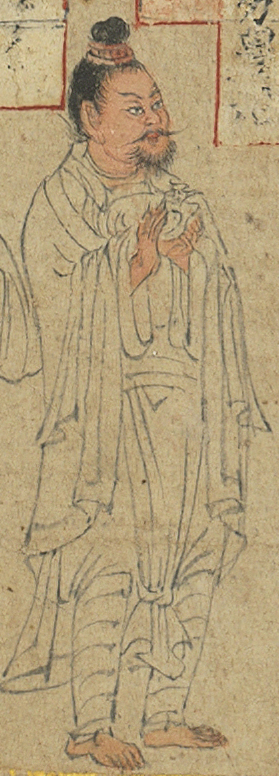
Xinuluo r.649-674

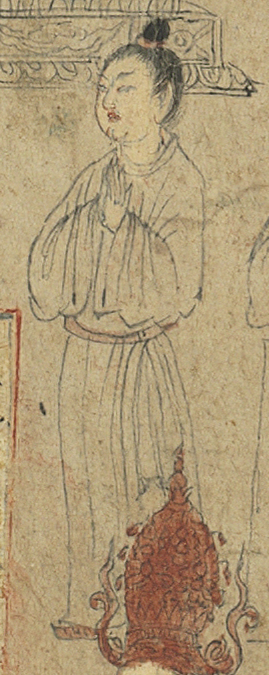
Luosheng r.674-712

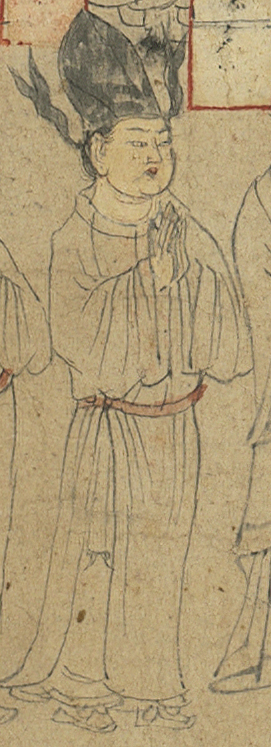
Shengluopi r.712-728

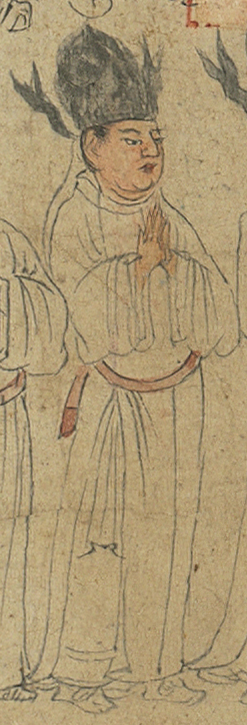
Piluoge r.(728-)738-748

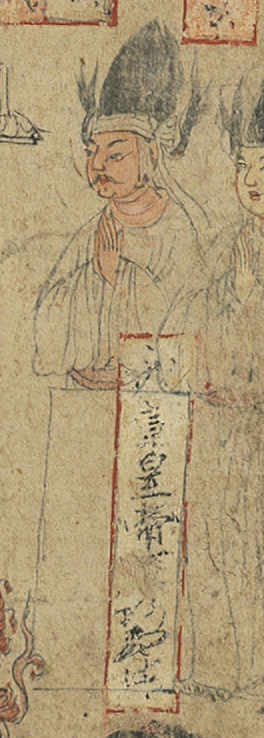
Geluofeng r.748-779

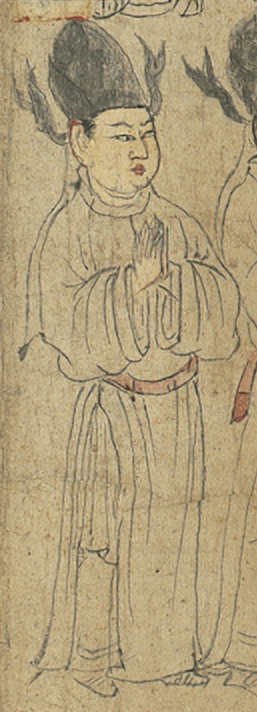
Yimouxun r.779-808

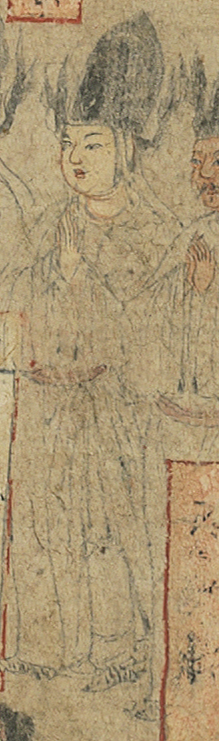
Xungequan r.808-809

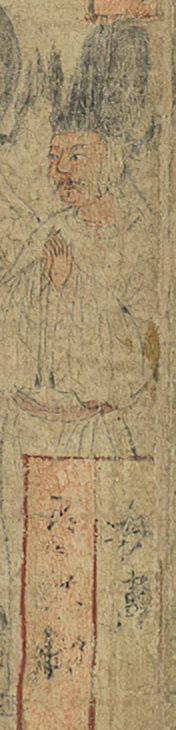
Quanlongcheng r.809-816

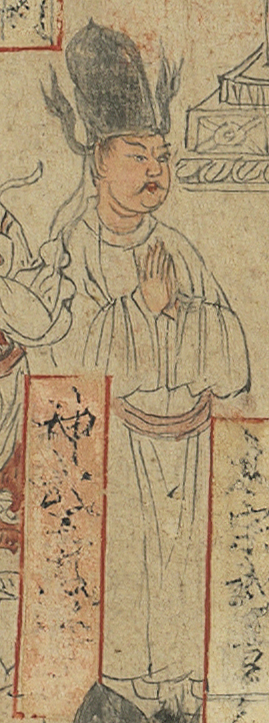
Quanli(sheng) r.816-823

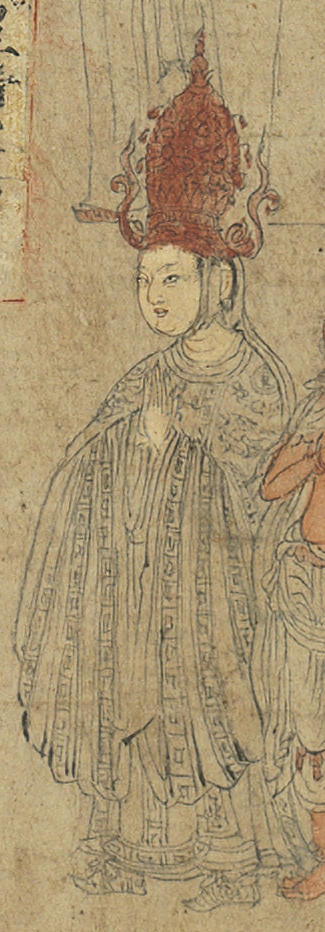
Quanfengyou r.823-859

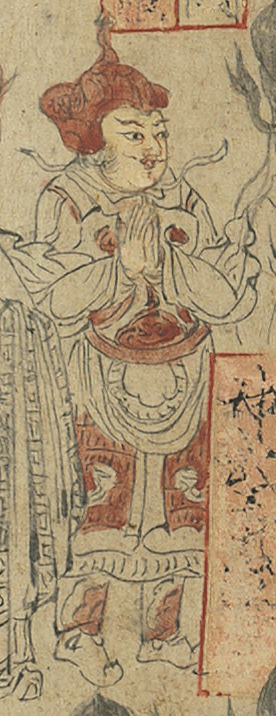
Shilong r.859-877

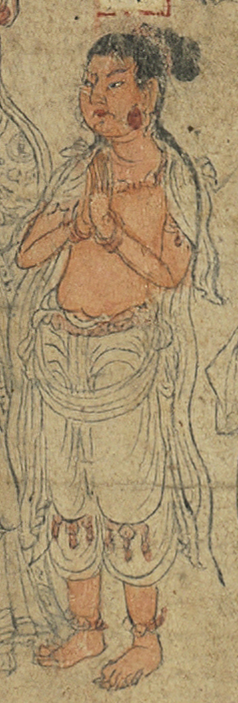
Longshun r.878-897

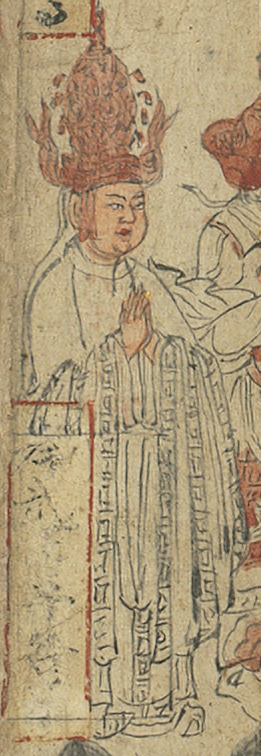
Shunhuazhen r.897-902

== Family tree of monarchs ==
Family of Nanzhao

Xinuluo 細奴邏; Duluo 獨羅 b.617-d.674; r.649-674
Luosheng 邏盛 b.634-d.712; r.674-712
Shengluopi 盛邏皮 b.673-d.728; r.712-728	Yangé 炎閣 ?-712
Piluoge 皮邏閣 b.697-d748 r.(728-)738-748
Geluofeng 閣羅鳳 b.712-d.779; r.748-779
Fengjiayi 鳳迦異
Yimouxun 異牟尋 b.754-d.808; r.779-808
Xungequan 尋閣勸 b.778-d.809; r.808-809
Quanlongcheng 勸隆晟 b.798-d.816; r.809-816	Quanli(sheng) 勸利(晟) b.802-d.823; r.816-823	Quanfengyou 勸豐祐 d.859; r.823-859
Shilong 世隆 b.844-d.877; r.859-877
Longshun 隆舜 d.897; r.878-897
Shunhuazhen 舜化貞 b.877-d.902; r.897-902

== Bibliography ==
- Beckwith, Christopher I. (1987). The Tibetan Empire in Central Asia: A History of the Struggle for Great Power among Tibetans, Turks, Arabs, and Chinese during the Early Middle Ages. Princeton University Press.
- Blackmore, M. (1960). "The Rise of Nan-Chao in Yunnan". Journal of Southeast Asian History. 1 (2): 47–61. doi:10.1017/S0217781100000132.
- Bryson, Megan (2013), "Baijie and the Bai: Gender and Ethnic Religion in Dali, Yunnan", Asian Ethnology (72)
- Bryson, Megan (2016), Goddess on the Frontier: Religion, Ethnicity, and Gender in Southwest China, Stanford University Press
- Bryson, Megan (2019), The Great Kingdom of Eternal Peace: Buddhist Kingship in Tenth-Century Dali
- Coedès, George (1968). Walter F. Vella (ed.). The Indianized States of Southeast Asia. Translated by Susan Brown Cowing. University of Hawaii Press. ISBN 978-0-8248-0368-1.
- Daniels, Christian (2021), Nanzhao as a Southeast Asian kingdom, c.738-902, Journal of Southeast Asian Studies, pp. 188–213, doi:10.1017/S0022463421000424
- Daniels, Christian (2023), Buddhist kingship and governance in the Dali Kingdom, 1140s to 1200, Journal of Southeast Asian Studies
- Ebrey, Patricia Buckley (1999). The Cambridge Illustrated History of China. Cambridge: Cambridge University Press. ISBN 0-521-66991-X..
- Hall, D.G.E. (1960). Burma (3rd ed.). Hutchinson University Library. ASIN B001GV5XHW.
- Harrell, Stevan (1995), The History of the History of the Yi
- Harrell, Stevan (2001), Ways of Being Ethnic in Southwest China
- Harvey, G. E. (1925). History of Burma: From the Earliest Times to 10 March 1824. London: Frank Cass & Co. Ltd.
- Heirman, Ann; Meinert, Carmen; Anderl, Christoph (2018). Buddhist Encounters and Identities Across East Asia. BRILL. ISBN 9789004366152.
- Herman, John E. (2007). Amid the Clouds and Mist China's Colonization of Guizhou, 1200–1700. Harvard University Asia Center. ISBN 978-0-674-02591-2.
- Herman, John (2009), The Kingdoms of Nanzhong China's Southwest Border Region Prior to the Eighth Century
- Huang, Caiwen (2020), The Lancang Guard and the Construction of Ming society in northwest Yunnan
- Kiernan, Ben (2017). Việt Nam: a history from earliest time to the present. Oxford University Press. ISBN 9780190053796.
- Lloyd, John C. (2003), Toponyms of the Nanzhao periphery
- Schafer, Edward Hetzel (1967), The Vermilion Bird: T'ang Images of the South, Los Angeles: University of California Press, ISBN 9780520011458
- Moore, Elizabeth H. (2007). Early Landscapes of Myanmar. Bangkok: River Books. ISBN 978-974-9863-31-2.
- Skutsch, Carl (2005), Encyclopedia of the World's Minorities, Routledge
- Taylor, Keith Weller (1983), The Birth of the Vietnam, University of California Press, ISBN 9780520074170
- Taylor, K.W. (2013), A History of the Vietnamese, Cambridge University Press, ISBN 9780520074170
- Thant, Myint-U (2008), The River of Lost Footsteps: Histories of Burma
- Twitchett, Denis C. (1979). The Cambridge History of China, Vol. 3, Sui and T'ang China, 589–906. Cambridge University Press.
- Walker, Hugh Dyson (2012), East Asia: A New History, AuthorHouse, ISBN 978-1477265161
- Wang, Feng (2004). "Language policy for Bai". In Zhou, Minglang (ed.). Language policy in the People's Republic of China: Theory and practice since 1949. Kluwer Academic Publishers. pp. 278–287. ISBN 978-1-4020-8038-8.
- Wang, Zhenping (2013). Tang China in Multi-Polar Asia: A History of Diplomacy and War. University of Hawaii Press.
- Yang, Bin (2008a). "Chapter 3: Military Campaigns against Yunnan: A Cross-Regional Analysis". Between Winds and Clouds: The Making of Yunnan (Second Century BCE to Twentieth Century CE). Columbia University Press.
- Yang, Bin (2008b). "Chapter 4: Rule Based on Native Customs". Between Winds and Clouds: The Making of Yunnan (Second Century BCE to Twentieth Century CE). Columbia University Press.
- Yang, Bin (2008c). "Chapter 5: Sinicization and Indigenization: The Emergence of the Yunnanese". Between Winds and Clouds: The Making of Yunnan (Second Century BCE to Twentieth Century CE). Columbia University Press.
