= Sakanmaw =

- Village
- Location in Burma
- Coordinates: 19°38′27″N 94°2′13″E
- Country: Burma
- State: Rakhine State
- District: Kyaukpyu District
- Township: Ann Township
- Time zone: UTC+6.30 (MST)

Sakanmaw is a village in Ann Township, Kyaukpyu District, in the Rakhine State of southwestern Burma. It is located 22.9 kilometres (14.2 mi) by road south of Ann. The village is narrow and long in shape, sandwiched between the highway and a meandering river. The 10 IAF Squadron of the Indian Air Force wiped out the village during World War II because it was an important Japanese concentration point. To the south of Sakanmaw a roofed flat-boat over 60 feet (18 metres) long was attacked.
