= Li Ziqi (vlogger) =

Chinese vlogger, entrepreneur and Internet celebrity

- 李子柒
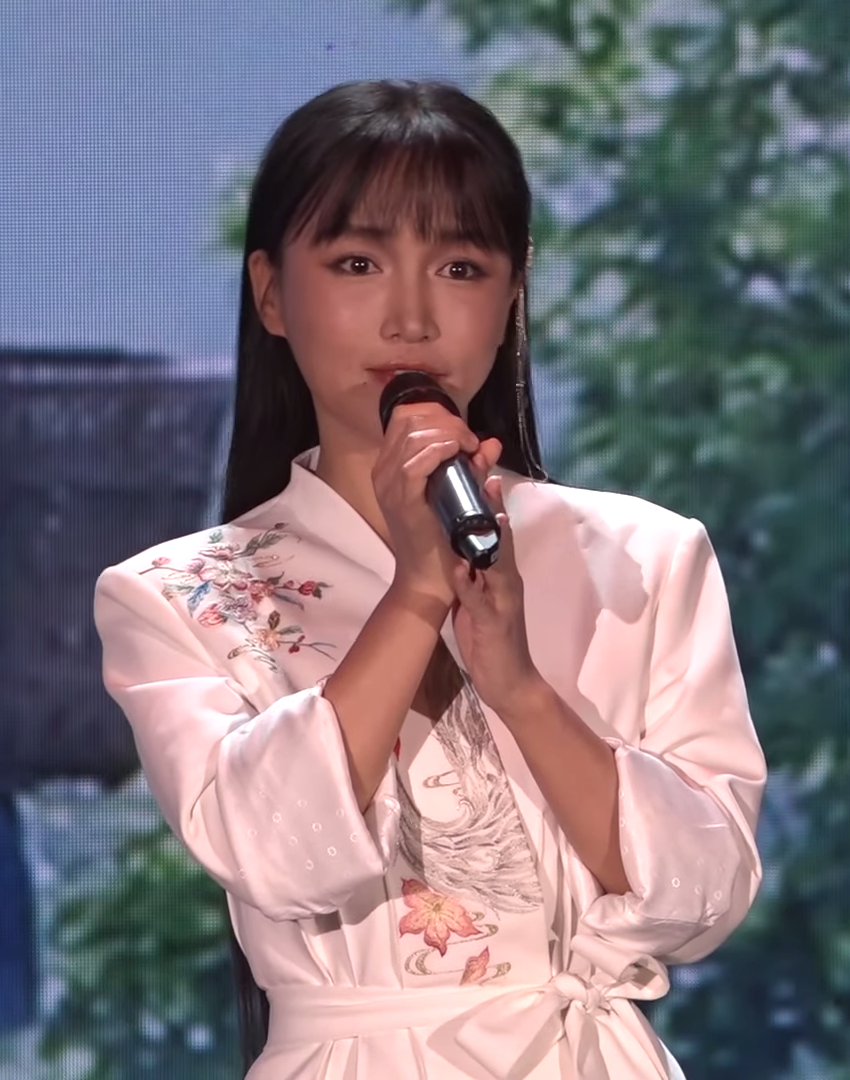
- Li in 2021
- Born: Li Jiajia; 6 July 1990 (age 36); Pingwu County, Mianyang, Sichuan, China
- Occupations: Internet celebrity; video blogger; entrepreneur

Bilibili information
- Channel: 李子柒
- Years active: 2016–present
- Followers: 10.3 million

YouTube information
- Channel: 李子柒 Liziqi
- Years active: 2017–present
- Genres: food and culture
- Subscribers: 32.7 million
- Views: 3.447 billion
- Last updated: August 8, 2026
- Website: Li Ziqi's Weibo

Li Ziqi
- Chinese: 李子柒
Transcriptions
Standard Mandarin
- Hanyu Pinyin: Lǐ Zǐqī
- Wade–Giles: Li^{3} Tzŭ^{3}-ch'i^{1}
- IPA: [lì tsɹ̩̀.tɕʰí]
Yue: Cantonese
- Yale Romanization: Léih Jí-chāt
- Jyutping: Lei5 Zi2-cat1
- IPA: [lej˩˧ tsi˧˥.tsʰɐt̚˥]

Birth name
- Chinese: 李佳佳
Transcriptions
Standard Mandarin
- Hanyu Pinyin: Lǐ Jiājiā

Li Ziqi ([lì tsɹ̩̀.tɕʰí]; Chinese: 李子柒; pinyin: Lǐ Zǐqī; born 6 July 1990) is a Chinese video blogger, entrepreneur, and Internet celebrity. She is known for creating food and handicraft preparation videos in her hometown of rural Pingwu County, Mianyang, north-central Sichuan province, southwest China, often from basic ingredients and tools using traditional Chinese techniques. In February 2021, she received the Guinness World Record for "The most subscribers for a Chinese language channel on YouTube."

== Early life ==
Li was born on 6 July 1990 in Sichuan, China, originally named "Li Jiajia" (李佳佳). Public knowledge of Li's private life is primarily based on her statements in social media and to mass media.

She was orphaned at a very young age. In an interview with Goldthread, Li stated that she moved in with her grandparents after her stepmother mistreated her. She was raised in poverty.

At 14 years old, Li began working as a restaurant waitress. Later, she learned how to DJ and worked in a night club in Mianyang.

In 2012, her grandfather died. Li moved back to her home village to care for her grandmother who had become ill.

== Career ==
Li started posting her videos on Meipai in 2015. Initially, Li made her videos by herself, but her video editing skills at the time failed to "capture the creativity" she tried to express. In 2016, one of Li's videos titled Peach Wine caught the attention of a video-making platform CEO, who featured the video on the platform's front page, which soon elicited more followers for Li's channel. She released her first video to YouTube in 2017 with the title "Making a dress out of grape skins." As of January 2024, she had over 18 million subscribers on YouTube, and as of January 2024 she had over 26.3 million followers on Sina Weibo, over 5 million followers on Facebook, and inspired many bloggers to post similar content.

Her mainland audience includes urban millennials. Li's popularity may be attributed to fugu (复古, retro-nostalgia), a growing appreciation in modern China for traditional culture. In an interview with Goldthread in September 2019, Li stated "I simply want people in the city to know where their food comes from."

A majority of Li's videos focus on traditional foods and antiques. Besides food preparation videos, other popular videos of Li's include creating makeup and dresses dyed with grape skins. Li rarely speaks in her videos, and the sounds of nature, cooking, and calm music are most prominent. Hemispheres magazine stated, "The only narration is friendly banter between Li and her grandmother, but the sounds—the singing of birds, the crunch of frost underfoot, the thwack of a cleaver, the sizzle of frying garlic—lure you into an ASMR trance, so you don't even notice how many videos you've binged." Her videos are generally between 5 and 20 minutes. In her postings, Li frequently uses hashtags that evoke nostalgia, with one of her favorites being "Dawn blossoms plucked by [Zi]Qi," an allusion to Lu Xun's nostalgic sentiment in the essay collection Dawn Blossoms Plucked at Dusk.

In 2018, she launched a food brand under her own name and sold prepackaged food through e-commerce. She opened the e-commerce shop on Tmall. In 2020, she founded a factory in Liuzhou to produce luosifen.

She was awarded the People's Choice Award by the Central Committee of the Chinese Communist Party's official People's Daily newspaper in September 2019. That same year, she was selected as 2019 Person of the Year in Cultural Communication by China Newsweek. In August 2020, Li was nominated as a member of the All-China Youth Federation. Li, along with Ms Yeah and Dianxi Xiaoge, are the only Chinese Internet celebrities who have reached international prominence.

=== Legal dispute ===
In July 2021, Li put her vlogger career on hiatus due to a legal dispute with her business partners. On 27 October 2021, Li formally sued her multi-channel network (MCN) partner firm Hangzhou Weinian. Although the dispute contents have not been publicized, various media suggested that it is related to commercialization of the Li Ziqi brand. A week prior, in an interview on state-run China Central Television (CCTV), Li stated that "she does not want to see her intellectual property over-commercialized."

In December 2022, Li Ziqi became the controller of a company that owns the intellectual property linked to her name and brand after the court dispute.

=== 2023 reappearance ===
In September 2023, Li briefly appeared in a video for the China Association of Young Rural Entrepreneurial Leaders. She acted as the official ambassador for the Chinese Farmers' Harvest Festival, which occurs annually on the autumn equinox.

=== 2024 return ===
After three years of absence, Li Ziqi announced her comeback in November 2024.

== Reception ==
Li received her first official praise from China's official channels in on 18 May 2017, when the Weibo account of the Central Committee of the Communist Youth League re-posted one of her videos with the comment, "Salute every young person fighting for their dreams" and "every hard-working young person who does not waste time. The Motherland is proud of you for your hard work." CCTV has also praised her and stated "Without a word commending China, Li promotes Chinese culture in a good way and tells a good China story."

Journalists have indicated that her videos may be viewed by some as a means of promoting Chinese government soft power. In 2019, writer Cai Jiangzhou posted an essay on Weibo contending that Li's videos should be considered a "cultural export"; the essay and its related hashtags received ten million views, leading to online discussion of whether Li's videos could enhance China's soft power. Responding to those who contended that Li's videos showed backwards rural life to foreigners, Cai asked, "Why can't we view labouring in the fields as a cultural export? This is clearly a strength of the Chinese nation, why does it necessarily mean 'poverty,' 'backwardness,' and 'failure to represent China'?" and contended that Li's video showed the strength of Chinese perseverance and self-sufficiency.

A 2023 academic study suggests that some foreign audiences drew parallels between Chinese culture and their own.

Academic Rui Kunze writes that Li's videos present an aspirational authenticity that seeks to portray what rural life and China's heritage mean to Li.

Some critics contend that Li's portrayals of country life distort reality. In particular, critics have stated that Li's videos presented a "gentrified vision" of contemporary rural life in China. Academic Rui Kunze writes that dismissing followers' feelings as escapist and criticizing Li's videos as inauthentic "fails to explore the followers' affective needs and desires underlying their fantasies, which are precisely what Li Ziqi addresses in her vlog."

Columnist Tejal Rao writes that Li's "D.I.Y. fantasies" show "the intriacy and intensity of labor" and the meaningful qualities of the "long, solitary processes of producing food" carried out by a "tireless, focused, confident, independent" woman.

Li's viewers generally regard her curated persona and content as demonstrating her work ethic, attachment to nature, entrepreneurialism, and devotion to her grandmother.

== Personal life ==
Li lives with her grandmother, who occasionally appears in videos, in the countryside of Mianyang in Southwest China's Sichuan. When Li was in fifth grade, her grandfather died. As a result, her grandmother was unable to pay for her education, and Li dropped out of school at the age of 14 to work in the city. She worked several jobs, including being a singer (2006–2007), a disc jockey (2007–2013), and a waitress (2016–2017). In 2012, she moved back to take care of her grandmother, who was sick at that time.

At the start, Li sold agricultural products on Taobao as a way to earn a living before moving on to be a vlogger.

Li initially did all photography and editing by herself. As she gained popularity and experience, she produced her videos with the help of a personal assistant and a videographer.

On the reality show I Am The Cooking God, Li described her ideal lifestyle as "working at sunrise and resting at sunset, [enjoying] purely natural food and the simplest lifestyle like in ancient times."

== See also ==
- Hanfu Movement
