= Dianxi Xiaoge =

Chinese food vlogger

Dianxi Xiaoge 滇西小哥
- Born: 1990 (age 35–36); Shidian County, Baoshan, Yunnan, China
- Education: Sichuan Police College
- Occupation: vlogger
- Years active: 2016–present

YouTube information
- Channels: Dianxi Xiaoge; 阿盆姐家的大王 Apenjie with Dawang
- Years active: 2018–present
- Genre: Cooking
- Subscribers: 10.7 million (Dianxi Xiaoge); 480,000 (阿盆姐家的大王 Apenjie with Dawang)
- Views: 3.5 billion (Dianxi Xiaoge); 106 million (阿盆姐家的大王 Apenjie with Dawang)

Online name Dianxi Xiaoge
- Chinese: 滇西小哥
- Literal meaning: Little Brother in Western Yunnan
Transcriptions
Standard Mandarin
- Hanyu Pinyin: Diān Xī Xiǎo Gē
Yue: Cantonese
- Jyutping: Tin^{4} Sai^{1} Siu^{2} Go^{1}

Real name Dong Meihua
- Traditional Chinese: 董梅華
- Simplified Chinese: 董梅华
Transcriptions
Standard Mandarin
- Hanyu Pinyin: Dǒng Méi Huá
Yue: Cantonese
- Jyutping: Dung^{2} Mui^{4} Waa^{4}

Nickname Penji
- Traditional Chinese: 盆雞
- Simplified Chinese: 盆鸡
- Literal meaning: Bucket Chicken
Transcriptions
Standard Mandarin
- Hanyu Pinyin: Pén Jī
Yue: Cantonese
- Jyutping: Pun^{4} Gai^{1}

Second nickname Apenjie
- Chinese: 阿盆姐
- Literal meaning: Bucket Sister
Transcriptions
Standard Mandarin
- Hanyu Pinyin: Ā Pén Jiě
Yue: Cantonese
- Jyutping: Aa^{3} Pun^{4} Ze^{2}
- Last updated: February 2, 2024
- Website: dianxi-xiaoge.com

Dianxi Xiaoge (Chinese: 滇西小哥; lit. 'Little Brother in Western Yunnan'; born 1990) is a Chinese food vlogger and YouTuber from Yunnan. Dianxi Xiaoge, along with Ms Yeah and Li Ziqi, are the only Chinese Internet celebrities who have reached international prominence, according to the Southern Metropolis Daily in 2019. Her actual name is Dong Meihua (simplified Chinese: 董梅华; traditional Chinese: 董梅華), and she goes by the nicknames Penji (simplified Chinese: 盆鸡; traditional Chinese: 盆雞; lit. 'Bucket Chicken') and Apenjie (Chinese: 阿盆姐; lit. 'Bucket Sister').

Dianxi Xiaoge lives on a family farm at the foot of a small mountain in the town of Youwang, Shidian County, Baoshan, west-central Yunnan, southwest China. It was challenging for her parents to make a living farming in the village, which led her to seek schooling and employment outside her province. Dianxi Xiaoge studied to become a police officer at Sichuan Police College though upon graduation in 2012 chose to join an Internet startup company in the marketing department. She planned to eventually buy a house in Chongqing and move her parents in so they would all have a better life. But she returned to her village in 2016 after her father had a heart attack. To make a living in Yunnan, Dianxi Xiaoge began selling local specialities online before capitalizing on the rise in 2016 of short videos when she started posting her own. She created her YouTube channel in 2018 and first went viral internationally after releasing a video where she made hamburgers for her grandparents who had never eaten them before.

Scholars have called her a cottagecore content creator and an example of the rural living segment of the Wanghong economy. Dianxi Xiaoge's videos showcase the calm, idyllic village life and feature her making videos of Yunnan cuisine using produce that she planted, harvested, and raised herself. Her male Alaskan Malamute named Dawang (Chinese: 大王; lit. 'Big King') follows her around in many videos. She ends her videos with a family meal of what she cooked. Urban dwellers have viewed her videos as a temporary refuge from the bustling, stressful city life. Coda Media's Isobel Cockerell said Dianxi Xiaoge's presence and popularity on YouTube despite the censorship of YouTube in China indicates she has implicit government support. In 2020, she had roughly 16 million subscribers on all her platforms including Sina Weibo, YouTube, Douyin, and Facebook, and her videos each were receiving roughly 20 million views. Her Weibo was among the 10 most subscribed independent accounts that year.

== Life and career ==
=== Home ===
Dianxi Xiaoge lives on a family farm at the foot of a small mountain in the town of Youwang, Shidian County, Baoshan, west-central Yunnan, southwest China. Her village in which 140 families live is about a one-hour bus ride from Baoshan Yunrui Airport. She lives about a 30-minute drive from the town in the remote mountains where houses including hers are constructed along the hillside. In her courtyard, she has a pigpen where she raises pigs and a cowshed where she raises cows. A stone bridge with water flowing downwards is at the right of the courtyard. Succulent plants and other kinds of flowers and plants fill up the entire courtyard. The house beams are made of old-style wooden frames. Inside the house, the walls are covered in several old photos, while the floor is made of wood. The farmhouse has a wood-fired stove. The house's second story has a section where her family stores corn. Her younger male cousin lives in the house next door and in 2019 purchased 300 baby chickens using funds from jobs he did outside the province.

=== Early life ===
Dianxi Xiaoge (Chinese: 滇西小哥), whose actual name is Dong Meihua (simplified Chinese: 董梅华; traditional Chinese: 董梅華), was born in 1990 in Shidian County in Baoshan, a prefecture-level city in west-central Yunnan province, an area that borders Myanmar. In Chinese, "Dian" is for short for Yunnan and "Xi" means "west". She included the phrase as part of her online name since she lives in the western part of Yunnan. In Chinese, "Xiaoge" means "little brother". Despite being a woman, she calls herself this since she had been a tomboy as a child. She found "Xiaomei" (Chinese: 小妹) to be too cute, whereas she liked "Xiaoge" for coming across as more playful and carefree. She has had Dianxi Xiaoge as her online name since around 2016. Dianxi Xiaoge also has the nickname Penji (simplified Chinese: 盆鸡; traditional Chinese: 盆雞; lit. 'Bucket Chicken'), and her viewers call her Apenjie (Chinese: 阿盆姐; lit. 'Bucket Sister'), mimicking her younger brother (Chinese: 小豪), Xiaohao, who calls her Apenjie in the videos. Her village's tradition is that when a baby is born, the mother's family will visit. The newborn will be named by whatever the family brings. Dianxi Xiaoge's maternal grandmother brought a bucket for cleansing and a chicken, which is why she was given the nickname "Penji" or "Bucket Chicken".

Dianxi Xiaoge is of Han ethnicity. Her father is Dong Chaoyu. She has a younger sister named Axia (阿霞) and a younger brother named Xiaohao (小豪), both of whom sometimes appear in her videos. When she had not yet entered primary school, Dianxi Xiaoge's mother had to wake up early in the morning to hike to the bottom of the mountain to bring back several buckets of springwater since their village did not have running water yet. Although her mother was adept at making all kinds of food, Dianxi Xiaoge was the most excited to eat the laba congee, which they would purchase from the county seat only a few times a year. It was too challenging for her family to subsist on only farming since the mountains were steep and the land was thin. Her parents worked at construction sites in various cities. In her pre-university days, whenever she was not in school, Dianxi Xiaoge would spend time with her parents and her younger sister at the sites. They would see each other during a hastily eaten lunch at the site. Her mother enjoyed cooking and stressed to Dianxi Xiaoge that village girls should know how to cook, so Dianxi Xiaoge and her sister cooked a lot of food from a young age. Her parents raised her and her sister in a traditional household to prepare them to perform household chores when they have their own families.

As a youth who grew up in the mountains, Dianxi Xiaoge had a deep desire to leave her hometown for a city where she would buy property and forge a better life for her family. When filling out her university preferences for the gaokao, she did not choose a single university in Yunnan. Dianxi Xiaoge attended the Sichuan Police College. She participated in rescue efforts during the August 14, 2010, landslide in Yingxiu. The public security bureau of Ngawa Tibetan and Qiang Autonomous Prefecture awarded her with a third-class Meritorious Service Medal for her rescue work. Dianxi Xiaoge was riding a bus in 2011 when it suddenly burst into flames. After she helped rescue people on the bus, the Sichuan Public Security Bureau gave her a second-class Meritorious Service Medal. The Luzhou city government in 2012 gave her the "Luzhou City acting bravely for a just cause warrior" award and the "Luzhou City Jiangyang District acting bravely for a just cause citizen" award. That year, the Sichuan Provincial Committee of the Communist Youth League of China gave her the "Outstanding Communist Youth League Member of Sichuan Province" award. While in college, she received monetary awards from the commendations for her actions during two rescue operations. Throughout her four years of college, she did not request funds from her family for her expenses since they were covered by her monetary awards.

=== Career ===
Dianxi Xiaoge graduated from Sichuan Police College in 2012, after which she sent her resume to provinces other than Yunnan since she had no interest in going home. Although her major was in becoming a police officer, she did not do any police work after graduation. She instead secured a marketing role at an Internet startup company, where she worked for over four years, and worked various jobs afterwards. Her goal was to buy a house in Chongqing and move her parents into the house to be with her. Her plans changed after her father had a heart attack in 2016 and needed to undergo an operation to insert a coronary stent. He would have to continue taking medicine for the rest of his life after the operation and could no longer do arduous work. After she learned that her father had become ill, Dianxi Xiaoge realized that she had too few memories of her parents. Keen to not have any regrets and treasuring being with family the most above all else, Dianxi Xiaoge returned in 2016 to Shidian County to the mountain she had left to be with her family after having been away for eight years for schooling and work.

Once home, she was initially perplexed about what to do to make a living as she had observed her parents' struggles. She started selling local specialties online such as fruits harvested from the mountain and Yunnan brown sugar. Dianxi Xiaoge received ridicule for her efforts and found that sales were weak even after she posted ads on the Moments feature of WeChat. Seeking a way to increase sales, she capitalized on the rise in 2016 of short videos and began posting her own. She was particularly influenced by people who had achieved success on the Internet, including Papi Jiang, a comedian. Dianxi Xiaoge had always enjoyed cooking so to start from a domain she was comfortable in, she began making cooking videos. She started uploading her videos to Xigua Video in 2016 and at the time had no prior filming and editing experience. The first video she uploaded was filmed using her cell phone and depicted her running into a bamboo forest. She showed viewers how to hack bamboo and find bamboo worms which she later fried. The 25 viewer comments Dianxi Xiaoge received were critical about her "eating bugs", and she encountered difficulties at the beginning of her video-making career. She used all of her savings and went into credit card debt to purchase materials to make videos. Her initial work resulted in low viewership and no profits, causing her to be disheartened when comparing herself to other creators. According to The Paper, whereas Dianxi Xiaoge put a lot of effort into making high-quality videos, the other creators focused on producing a large number of videos of lesser quality such as harvesting and then cooking sweet potatoes. She persisted in making videos, emphasizing a peaceful, pastoral way of living. In one year, she had grown her subscriber base to 100,000.

Dianxi Xiaoge signed an agreement in 2017 to be represented by the multi-channel network Papitube established by Papi Jiang. Within two to three years, she became a full-time video creator after viewership rose and she was making substantial profit, while those other creators she had envied were no longer making videos. She had not initially planned to have non-Chinese audiences view her videos. Dianxi Xiaoge started her YouTube channel in 2018 and within three months had grown her subscriber base from zero to one million in November 2018. Her video about her making hamburgers for her grandparents went viral in China and outside the country which brought her a lot of attention. Having lived their entire lives in the village, her grandparents had not previously eaten hamburgers which they viewed as a Western dish. After initially using the camera from her phone to film videos, she switched to using a Sony α7 camera. She spends her time in the village on most days rather than going into the town. Her day is occupied with filming and editing videos of her cooking.

Some overseas Chinese students in 2018 provided translated captions in numerous languages for Dianxi Xiaoge's videos which significantly grew her fanbase. She gave a talk at the University of Oxford after receiving an invitation from Baidu's Baijiahao to speak to Chinese students in December 2019 about her life in Yunnan. The Southern Metropolis Daily said in 2019 that Dianxi Xiaoge, along with Ms Yeah and Li Ziqi, were the only Chinese Internet celebrities who "have really successfully become popular overseas and made good money". Dianxi Xiaoge received three awards at Weibo's 2019 Weibo Celebrity Festival: "Annual Video Celebrity" (Chinese: 年度视频红人), "Promoted Celebrity" (Chinese: 带货红人), and "Top Ten Influential Food V" (Chinese: 十大影响力美食大V). The Yunnan Youth Entrepreneurship Association (Chinese: 云南省青年创业协会) named her a public welfare ambassador in 2019. On January 8, 2020, the Baoshan Culture and Tourism Bureau (Chinese: 保山市文化和旅游局) installed Dianxi Xiaoge as a "Baoshan Culture and Tourism Promotion Ambassador". The South China Morning Post listed her as among "9 Chinese women who made a big difference in 2020", overcoming the impediments the COVID-19 pandemic had wreaked on women. In 2021, Dianxi Xiaoge was promoted as the Baoshan Cultural Tourism Promotion Ambassador by the local government. Dianxi Xiaoge is a member of the Chinese Communist Party.

== Videos ==
Dianxi Xiaoge uploads videos weekly on Wednesdays. She makes videos of food from Yunnan using produce that she planted, harvested, and raised herself. Her videos depict the entire process of how food gets from the fields to her dinner table. Some of her videos depict Yunnan dishes she has previously consumed but not cooked. Shadowing and relying on instructions from village elders, she made those dishes for the first time for her videos.

She goes up the mountains in the early spring to pick wild fruits and vegetables. She preserves meat and cooks rice noodles. During the Dragon Boat Festival, she picked rice dumpling leaves with her family to make zongzi. In the summer, she picked lotus roots to make lotus root powder. A 10-minute long video that seems leisurely can take an entire day or a week of preparation followed by over ten hours of filming. At the end of her videos, she shows her family having a dinner together of the food she has cooked. The scenes frequently are filmed from 6 am or 7:00 am until between 11:00 pm and 2:00 am. Scenes take a variable amount of time to film since the wood-fired stove takes an inconstant amount of time, and she tries remaking a dish if it does not appear correctly done. In 2020, after she finished filming their reunion dinner, they had their actual reunion dinner at 5:00 am.

Dianxi Xiaoge features her dog, a male Alaskan Malamute named Dawang (Chinese: 大王; lit. 'Big King'), in numerous videos. The inspiration to have Dawang had its roots in her seeing a large dog of the same breed when she was traveling home from her job in Chongqing. That dog was being walked by a girl which created feelings of envy in Dianxi Xiaoge who told her sister her goal of having a large dog too. Within a year of her return to Yunnan, Dianxi Xiaoge's sister bought her Dawang. She initially did not include Dawang in her videos as she was worried that viewers would ask why she had a foreign dog when living in a rural village. After taking care of him for seven months, she was filming their communal dinner at a late time and Dawang refused to leave. That marked his first time appearing in a video. Wagging his tail, Dawang is shown following Dianxi Xiaoge when she heads to the mountains or back down and when she enters the kitchen or eats a meal with her family. Dawang is seen eating banana leafs, rolling about in the mud, and running in the countryside. Her younger brother, Xiaohao, also appears in numerous clips such as doing household chores with her early in the day. He goes to boarding school on weekdays and returns home on weekends. Dianxi Xiaoge puts in Xiaohao's schoolbag snacks such as tamarind, maltose, and Chinese chestnuts. She shares humorous scenes with her family that her Chinese viewers deeply relate to such as her grandmother chastising Dianxi Xiaoge for starting to diet. She introduces dishes special to Yunnan such as spicy sauce, cooked rice, tamarind cake, and Yunnan ham cake. Some of her dishes such as "hairy tofu" are unfamiliar to people in China who live outside Yunnan. In her videos, she has gone mushroom hunting, collected honey from flowers, and picked winter melon. She homebrews sweet rice wine. Her most viewed video "Have you tried Lard-sealed Pork, it's juicy but not greasy" (Chinese: 炼猪油、炸油底肉，提前准备过年菜), which received over 28 million views by the end of 2019, is about making a Chinese New Year dish. Similar to her other productions, the video closes with her family sharing a meal of the lard-sealed pork.

In many of her videos, Dianxi Xiaoge makes multiple kinds of dishes using a highlighted ingredient, such as tropical fruit, beef balls, potatoes, or Yunnan-style cheese. She makes Yunnan-style mooncakes that have a honey-sweetened ham filling. Dianxi Xiaoge uploaded a video around November 2020 of her consuming a lettuce wrap containing chili pepper, garlic, and meat. Korean commenters shared unfavorable feedback since she uploaded the video with "I'll continue to share my life and Yunnan-styled food in my uploads" in the description, but the commenters thought her dish was made in the same way as ssam, a Korean food.

She does not have professional camera operators or film editors. She and her sister comprise her film crew. She did not hire anyone as it is difficult for people in the creative industry to make a living in the secluded Baoshan which is unable to keep them from leaving. In 2020, she had roughly 16 million subscribers on all her platforms, and her videos each were receiving roughly 20 million views. At the beginning of 2020, she had 3.28 million Sina Weibo subscribers, 3.88 million YouTube subscribers, 1.43 million Douyin subscribers, and 540,000 Facebook followers. Her Weibo was among the 10 most subscribed independent accounts that year.

== Commentary ==
=== Style ===
Dianxi Xiaoge showcases the local style of the ethnic minority in Yunnan while also filming a peaceful and simple life in the country that her viewers crave but are unable to experience themselves, The Paper found. Jed Gregorio of the Philippine Daily Inquirer found Dianxi Xiaoge's videos to be "immaculately produced, with a minimalist aesthetic". Mashable's Amanda Yeo said her "gorgeous videos feel more cosy and rough, like a warm friend inviting you into her home to share a home-cooked meal". Her videos "show the pastoral style of nature, the poetic and artistic charm of harmonious coexistence between man and nature", according to Voice of America. They give urban dwellers a momentary refuge from bustling cities. People's Daily praised Dianxi Xiaoge, saying that during the COVID-19 pandemic, urban dwellers who watched her videos felt "an escape from the reality of life". KQED Inc.'s Ruth Gebreyesus agreed, calling her videos "as much a visual delight as they are a sonic feast" and said that "one episode after another, her bucolic Yunnan life is a respite from the realities of quarantine and city life". Clarissa Wei of South China Morning Post Publishers's Goldthread found that since Baoshan, the city where Dianxi Xiaoge lives, is "in a less touristy part of the province", it "lend[s] her videos an additional air of authenticity". Writing for Xinhua News Agency, Julia Pierrepont III said that "Unlike most of the other rural bloggers who rely on a more authentic, amateur style of camerawork" Dianxi Xiaoge "specializes in highly-stylized, artistic and professional cinematography".

Dianxi Xiaoge said that there were three broad categories for short videos. In the first, viewers learn how to do something such as cook a dish. In the second, viewers are made to laugh. In the third, viewers learn about the fine cuisine of a particular culture and the social customs and local conditions of a place. Her initial videos were in the first category of teaching people to cook a dish but the style was unsuccessful since Yunnan's unique ingredients made it challenging for viewers to follow her videos to make the same dish. She could make instructional cooking videos of dishes that did not need Yunnan's unique ingredients but that would make her indistinguishable from other video makers. Dianxi Xiaoge said her videos belonged to the third category as with numerous food ingredients and over 50 ethnic groups, Yunnan has much for her to examine and show. She did not include subtitles in her videos since her aim was not to teach people to cook dishes but to show her village's way of living. Dianxi Xiaoge speaks with her family in the Baoshan dialect of Southwestern Mandarin which leads to some Weibo commenters saying they are unable to comprehend what she is saying. In her videos, she generally does not say much.

Xinhua News Agency and the 2021 book The Future of Global Retail compared Dianxi Xiaoge to fellow food vlogger Li Ziqi. The two women both have numerous followers who are not from China and have an identical business model. Like Li, Dianxi Xiaoge uploads videos to YouTube and sells the cooking merchandise depicted in her videos on the online shopping platform Taobao. Whereas Dianxi Xiaoge has candid videos in which people in the backdrop do not seem to know they are part of the video, Li's videos look "dreamlike" and seem to be shot almost too perfectly". For making dishes, Dianxi Xiaoge employs a steel bucket, something that other families in the country would use, whereas Li has an "'antique wood' bucket" that could be from a house furnished by an interior designer. Dianxi Xiaoge comes across as "the girl next door, warm, chatty and casual", who makes "simple and interesting dishes" sourced from her village's crops. Nie said that "both portray a serene pastoral life with wonderful food and enticing dishes" and "are successful entrepreneurs that leverage our dreams of living simply but also fulfil our desires for quality produce and sensory experiences".

Compared to other rural creators in China, Dianxi Xiageo's videos do not have as much speaking and have "more refined countryside images" as her videos are skillfully filmed and edited. Writing for Mashable, Amanda Yeo called her "basically a kindhearted Disney heroine made real — you get the impression that she lives in happy harmony with her family, her local community, and nature all at once". A Southern Metropolis Daily reviewer found that her videos over the years had improved in having clearer audio and more apt background music. The scholar Han Li found that after Dianxi Xiaoge partnered with the MCN Papitube, she has capably demonstrated her "flight from the city". Likening Dianxi Xiaoge to the Chinese documentary television series A Bite of China, Xinhua said Dianxi Xiaoge could be called A Bite of Yunnan in introducing Yunnan cuisine to the world. Kaila Yu of Paper called Dianxi Xiaoge a cottagecore producer who embodies "the traditional family unit", a common theme of Chinese creators in the genre. Worcester Polytechnic Institute professor Jennifer deWinter said of Dianxi Xiaoge's videos, "It's a complete brain break: pleasant sounds and pleasant visuals and a kind of Chinese cottagecore aesthetic." Li concluded that the high viewership of her videos is owing to the bucolic rural way of living, the peaceful imagery, and the uncommon dishes and ways of cooking in Yunnan.

=== Anti-consumerism and anti-commercialism ===
Overall, Dianxi xiaoge's countryside videos involve multiple paradoxes regarding the rural idyll. As for the "rural" aspect, her videos are filled with visual images of local ethnic and rural signifiers. ... In addition to local distinctiveness, her videos also seek to use the slow-paced rural temporality as an alternative social ordering to resist the time-space of urban living and capitalistic commodification. The rural life demonstrated in her videos is real, yet fantastic; is of slow-paced leisure, yet can only exist in fast-edited temporality; and is detached from commercialism, yet still highly commodified. In Dianxi xiaoge's video, the aestheticization of everyday life blurs the boundaries of art, life, and fantasy. To viewers, the modern fantasy of rural idyll needs to be displayed as real life to be "true" or "believable"; however, for Dianxi xiaoge and her family, their everyday life can only be seen if it meets the horizon of such a fantasy.

— Han Li in the International Journal of Communication

Voice of America's Yu Zhou said that her videos are examples of anti-consumerism and anti-commercialism since she creates everything by hand and at home. In one March 22, 2019, video, Dianxi Xiaoge cooked five dishes using roses and revealed that she was promoting rose cakes branded with her name that would be sold for the first time on her e-commerce website. In another video, Dianxi Xiaoge showed how to put together a tofu skin snack. She debuted her branded tofu skin delicacy on her e-commerce website within two days of her publishing the video. She highlighted in her video that large factories were unable to reproduce her technique to make the delicacy since she went through meticulous steps of procuring natural soybean and water as the tofu skin's sole ingredients. Stating that the delicacy allows consumers to "taste the humanity of Yunnan", she stated that this justifies the product's being more expensive. Li observed that "the very gesture of anticommercialization can only be realized through the commodification of her digital productions" and Dianxi Xiaoge and the consumers "have no choice but to resort to consumerism for anticommercializing".

=== Chinese culture, rural living, and implicit government support ===
Chinese culture is a theme in Dianxi Xiaoge's videos. Lugging a suitcase, her brother, Chun, returns from the city to their family in a Chinese New Year video. The poignant scene invokes the Chinese concept of "Xiangchou" (Chinese: 乡愁) in which people are nostalgic of their hometown. The video shows a joyful family sharing an abundant meal and enjoying fireworks. Her videos are an example of the rural living segment of the Wanghong economy.

Videos like Dianxi Xiaoge's combat the perception of villages being a trend. The Chinese government did not introduce any restrictions on Dianxi Xiaoge, despite her being very popular on YouTube, which the scholar Li Han found "very telling". Dianxi Xiaoge and fellow vlogger Li Ziqi have a high-profile presence on YouTube, which the Chinese government has blocked. Isobel Cockerell of Coda Media said, "Given their visibility and large followings, it is likely that their work has at least the tacit approval of the state. After all, the vision of life they present is a useful one." Xinhua News Agency's Julia Pierrepont III said that Dianxi Xiaoge makes a large amount of money while "capitalizing on the return to the global simpler life movement" and "help[ing] promote the development of rural China". The City University of Hong Kong called her one of the "important participants in China's current cultural export" in showing the pastoral lifestyle of villages and Yunnan culture and cuisine. Her content coincides with the Chinese government's focus on elevated "cultural confidence" in which Chinese people enjoy and exult in Chinese culture and identity. Han Li wrote in the International Journal of Communication that by creating a "hyperreality of Yunnan countryside life", "this ostensibly peaceful pastoral life, rather than a truthful representation of rural life, is more of simulacrum constructed according to a normative idyllic dream". Dianxi Xiaoge said in 2019 that she left the city to return to her village not only because her father had gotten ill, but also to escape the difficult living situation in the city where she had a strenuous work schedule, expensive cost of living, and feelings of instability.

Coda Media's Isobel Cockerell said Dianxi Xiaoge has been criticized for creating content that helps the Chinese Communist Party with their aims. In July 2020, she traveled to Yunnan's Tibetan autonomous prefecture to show what it was like to live there. As she consumed yak butter tea and made Tibetan-style pots on film, her video captured the architecture, people, and food of the mountainous populace. Cockerell concluded, "Any thoughts of China's decades of repressive policies towards Tibetans are gently spirited away." Linda Qian, a University of Oxford doctoral candidate whose research is focused on "Chinese rural nostalgia" observed of Dianxi Xiaoge's Tibet video, "People get to see a different side of China that they didn't know. And they can be like, 'Oh it can actually be pretty beautiful. Oh, it's not just the oppressive CCP with surveillance everywhere. All this is actually a fairytale.'"
