= Li Ziqi =

Li Ziqi may refer to:

- Li Ziqi (politician), a Chinese politician and former Party Committee Secretary of Gansu province
- Li Ziqi (vlogger), a Chinese food and country-life blogger and entrepreneur
