= Amfractus =

Scientific classification
- Kingdom: Animalia
- Phylum: Arthropoda
- Subphylum: Chelicerata
- Class: Arachnida
- Order: Araneae
- Infraorder: Araneomorphae
- Family: Linyphiidae
- Genus: Amfractus; Irfan, Zhang & Peng, 2022
- Species: A. dentefaber

Binomial name
- Amfractus dentefaber Irfan, Zhang & Peng, 2022

Synonyms
- Amfractus dentefaberis Irfan, Zhang & Peng, 2022

Species of spider

Amfractus is a monotypic genus of spiders in the family Linyphiidae containing the single species, Amfractus dentefaber.

== Distribution ==
Amfractus dentefaber has only been recorded from Yunnan province in China.

== Life style ==
The species was found in the forest of the mountains of Longling County at 2010 m.

== Etymology ==
The genus name is a variation of Latin anfractus "winding", referring to the spiral embolus in the male palp. The specific name is from Latin dentefaber "spike", referring to the cephalic region with spike-like long thick macrosetae in the male. The authors of the original description used "dentefaberis" as the epitheton, but corrected it to "dentefaber" in a subsequent publication.
