= Selfie culture on Chinese social media =

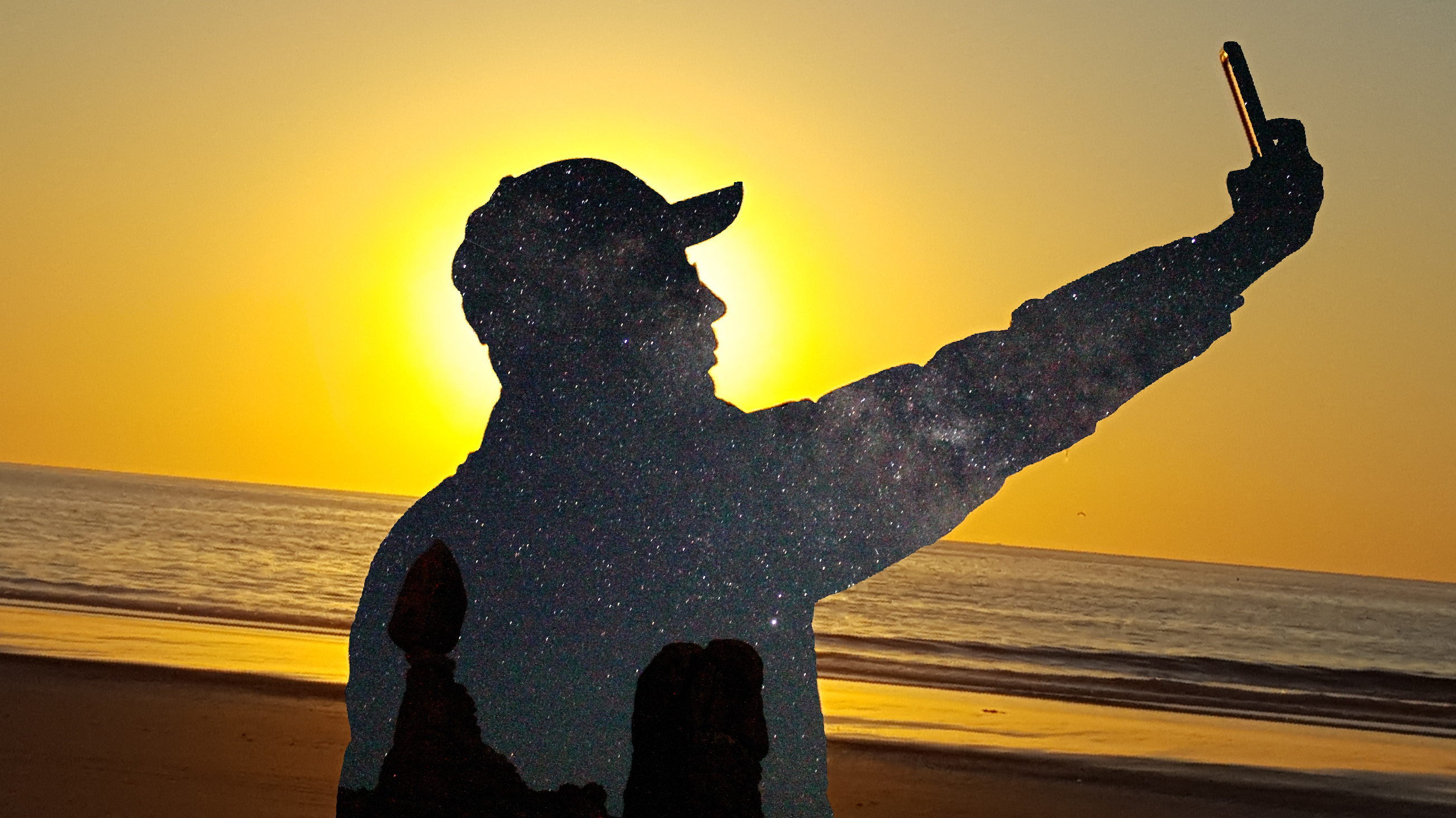

With the spread of smartphones and the rise of social media in China, taking selfies has become a new type of social culture that influences the economy. Selfie culture on Chinese social media has generated the "new form of self-disclosure" that affects the construction of individual identities and the existing beauty standards in Chinese society.

== The selfie economy ==
Following the rapid expansion of smartphones and social media, which encourages users to share photos, Chinese mobile phone companies have started to develop various products that use the need for selfies as a selling point.

Meitu Logo

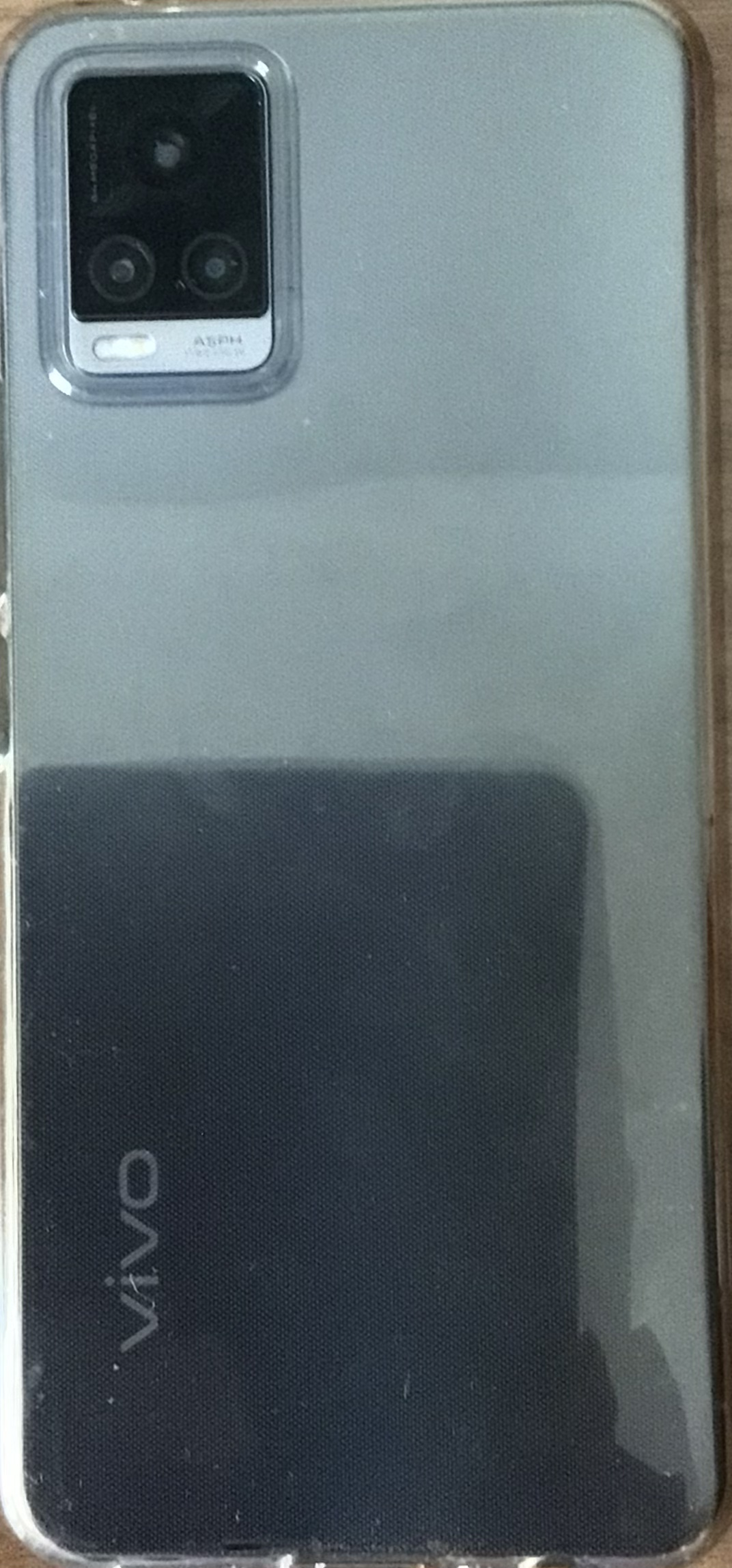
Vivo V20

For example, Vivo has developed many phones centered around satisfying the selfie needs of younger generations. They utilize the advertising slogan, "Light up your beauty" (Chinese: 照亮你的美) which emphasizes the rich features of the front-facing camera, tailoring its product to their target audience. In May 2013, Meitu (Chinese: 美图秀秀), which began as a photo editing software company, launched a smartphone specifically designed for taking selfies. Their first smartphone, MeituKiss, featured an automated beauty enhancement feature and a selfie button, showing the importance Meitu is giving to the selfie economy.

According to the market research company Aurora, image editing applications had a total of 535 million users in China between 2017 and 2018. Among these apps, Meitu is the software that has the most users, with a total of 214 million installations by the last week of May 2018. Their photography app, BeautyCam (Chinese: 美颜相机), had 138 million installations and ranked second in its category.

In a survey conducted by a team of Chinese university students, 82.4% of the university participants take selfies in their daily lives. This statistic also matches the 2018 Meitu user data research, illustrating that there is a significant market for selfies in China.

== The beauty filter controversy ==
Posting selfies on social media platforms has become an increasingly popular way for young Chinese people to showcase themselves to others. More and more camera-based products are being launched; and, use of beauty enhancement functions are also being heavily promoted. Unlike photo editing software such as Adobe Photoshop, beauty apps on mobile phones are much easier to use. Some even offer beauty functions that are just a click away. As technology continues to advance, increasingly powerful and convenient photo processing applications for mobile phones are emerging, gradually evolving into a controversial phenomenon on Chinese social media.

=== Pros ===
==== Gaining self confidence ====
In psychology, there is a phenomenon known as the 'halo effect', whereby an individual's perception of others attributes is judged upon the basis of some other unrelated attribute. In other words, impressions are made out of some external factors. Through the use of beauty filters, individuals can achieve a more refined appearance, allowing others to make a positive impression of themselves more easily. In the survey, a majority of university students claimed, that the beauty-filtered photos got them more attention and compliments. These filters give the students more self-confidence by getting them more social approval.

==== Promoting the economy ====
The emergence of beauty products has led to the development of an economy and a new industrial chain. People are able to present a relatively perfect image more easily online, thus giving rise to many internet celebrities, streamers, and other extended professions such as photo researcher, streamer assistant, etc. Specifically, photo retouching services is available on the Chinese e-commerce site Taobao, with the top four shops receiving more than 10,000 orders per month.

=== Cons ===
==== Eliminating aesthetic diversity ====
While beauty filters have brought quicker and easier social interaction, people's aesthetics have become less diverse as a uniform beauty standard has developed. The mainstream beauty filters seek smooth and flawless skin, slim chins and shiny big eyes. Dark circles and wrinkles are eliminated. The beauty filter creates a set of rules for beauty standards. Within the rules, everyone is young, beautiful and slender. The widespread access to beauty filters is also stifling the development of a diverse aesthetic, banishing those who are not slender, who have dark circles under their eyes, or who have wrinkles from the realm of "beauty".

==== Identity anxiety ====
The use of beauty filters can also create a psychological gap and a self-identity crisis. When the ideal does not match the reality, the social system that people have worked so hard to build is in danger of collapsing. In August 2019, a live streamer with the username "Your Highness Qiaobiluo"(Chinese: 乔碧萝殿下) was drawn into a situation where her beauty filter suddenly stopped working in the middle of a collaborative livestream. The difference in her unfiltered physical appearance drew controversy as many of her fans felt deceived. The incident brought wider social concern and an indelible negative impression to the streamer. She admitted that it was a planned event used to gain attention. Ultimately, she was banned from major live streaming platforms for "inappropriate commercial exploitation".

Among the statistics launched among university students, 80% of interviewees felt that there was a difference between themselves under the filter and their real selves, while 45% said that the prevalence of beauty filters has invariably added to their stress and anxiety. Some of them have even begun to avoid real social interaction, opting for online friendships instead. Excessive use of filters can therefore take away confidence, eventually led to a monotonous beauty ideal.

== Selfie and WeChat Moments ==
WeChat is China's leading communication software with over one billion active users per month. Its built-in "Moments" (Chinese: 朋友圈) allows users to share pictures, on which friends from the users' contact lists can send likes or comments.

Posting selfies in "Moments" provides a quick and easy way to present oneself, seek recognition and build a sense of self-identity by getting likes and comments. In "The Presentation of Self in Everyday Life", Goffman describes daily social activities as a theatrical stage where individuals seek to maintain an appropriate image to ensure that others perceive them favourably. In the context of WeChat's "Moments", selfies are not just a type of picture, but have become a social device for shaping one's self-image.
