= Hoya gaoligongensis =

Conservation status
- Vulnerable (IUCN 3.1)

Scientific classification
- Kingdom: Plantae
- Clade: Tracheophytes
- Clade: Angiosperms
- Clade: Eudicots
- Clade: Asterids
- Order: Gentianales
- Family: Apocynaceae
- Genus: Hoya
- Species: H. gaoligongensis

Binomial name
- Hoya gaoligongensis M.X. Zhao & Y.H. Tan

Species of plant

Hoya gaoligongensis grows in moist, evergreen, broad-leaved forests between 2,000 and 2,400 meters above sea level and is currently found only in pristine forests. It has the characteristics of living and growing on a large tree. It is very demanding on habitats such as forest quality, humidity, temperature and humus accumulation on bark surfaces. It was first found in Longling Xiaoheishan Provincial Nature Reserve, Yunnan Province, China.

== Distinction ==
Hoya gaoligongensis is similar with Hoya yuennanensis and Hoya globulosa. However, the phenotypic trait of leaves and flowers can be clearly distinguished from the other two plants.
