= Shidian County =

Coordinates: 24°43′08″N 99°12′00″E

Shidian County 施甸县
- County
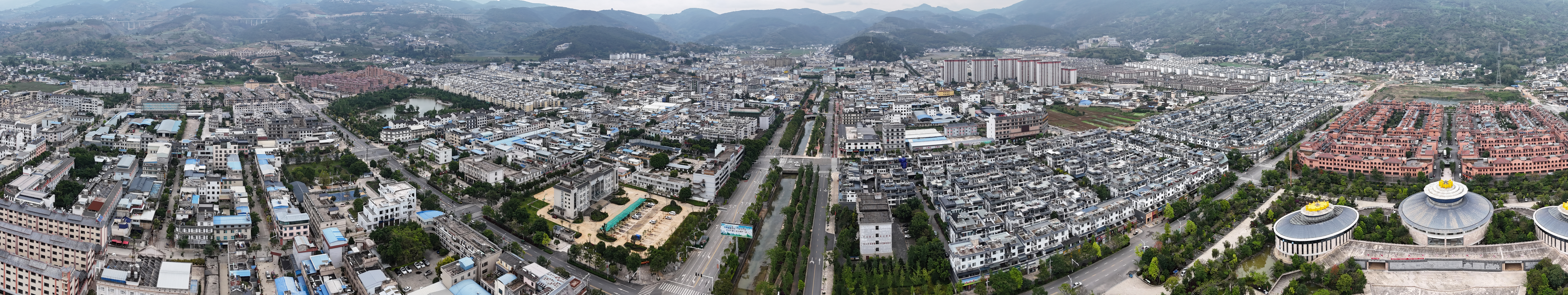
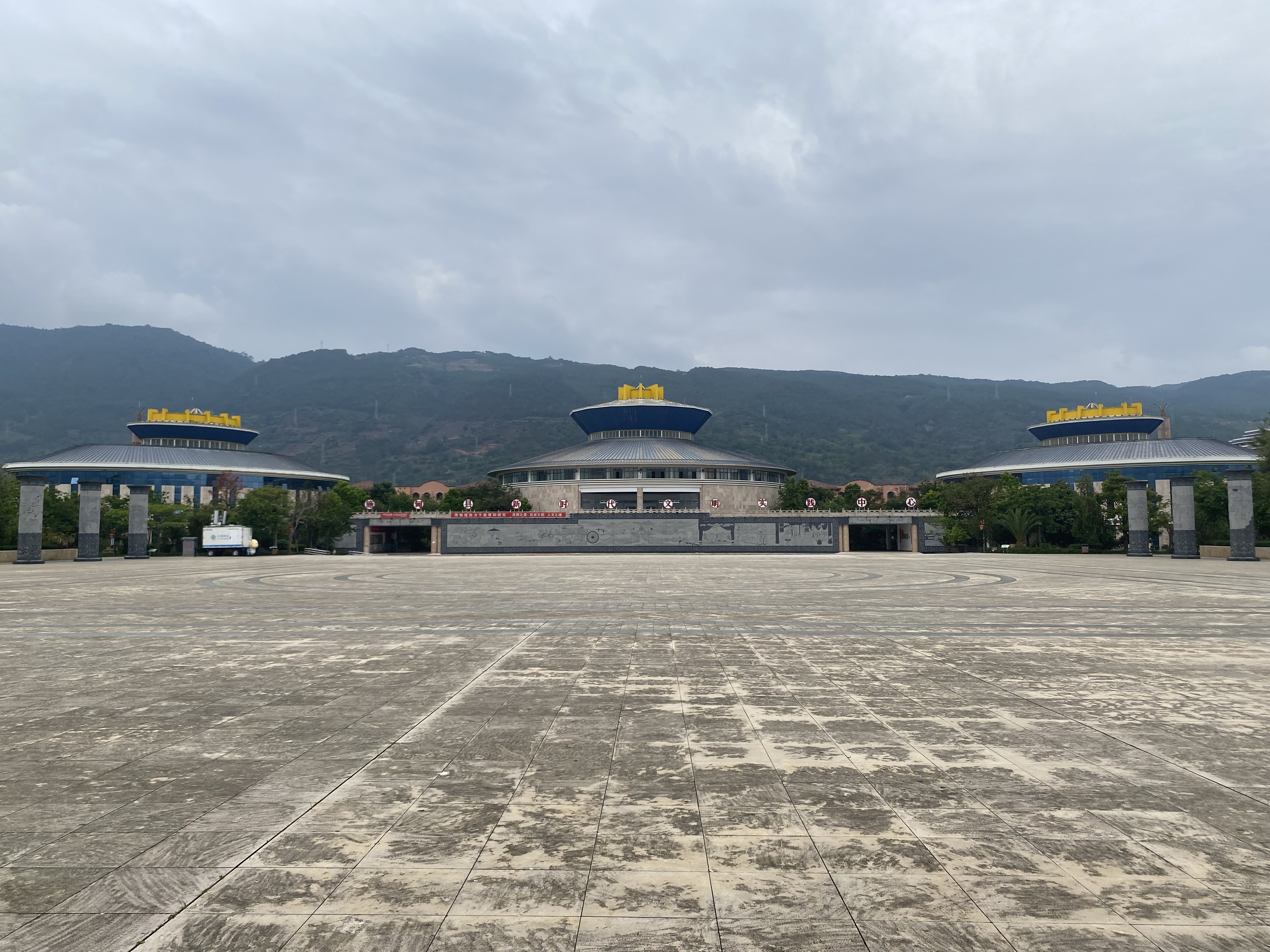
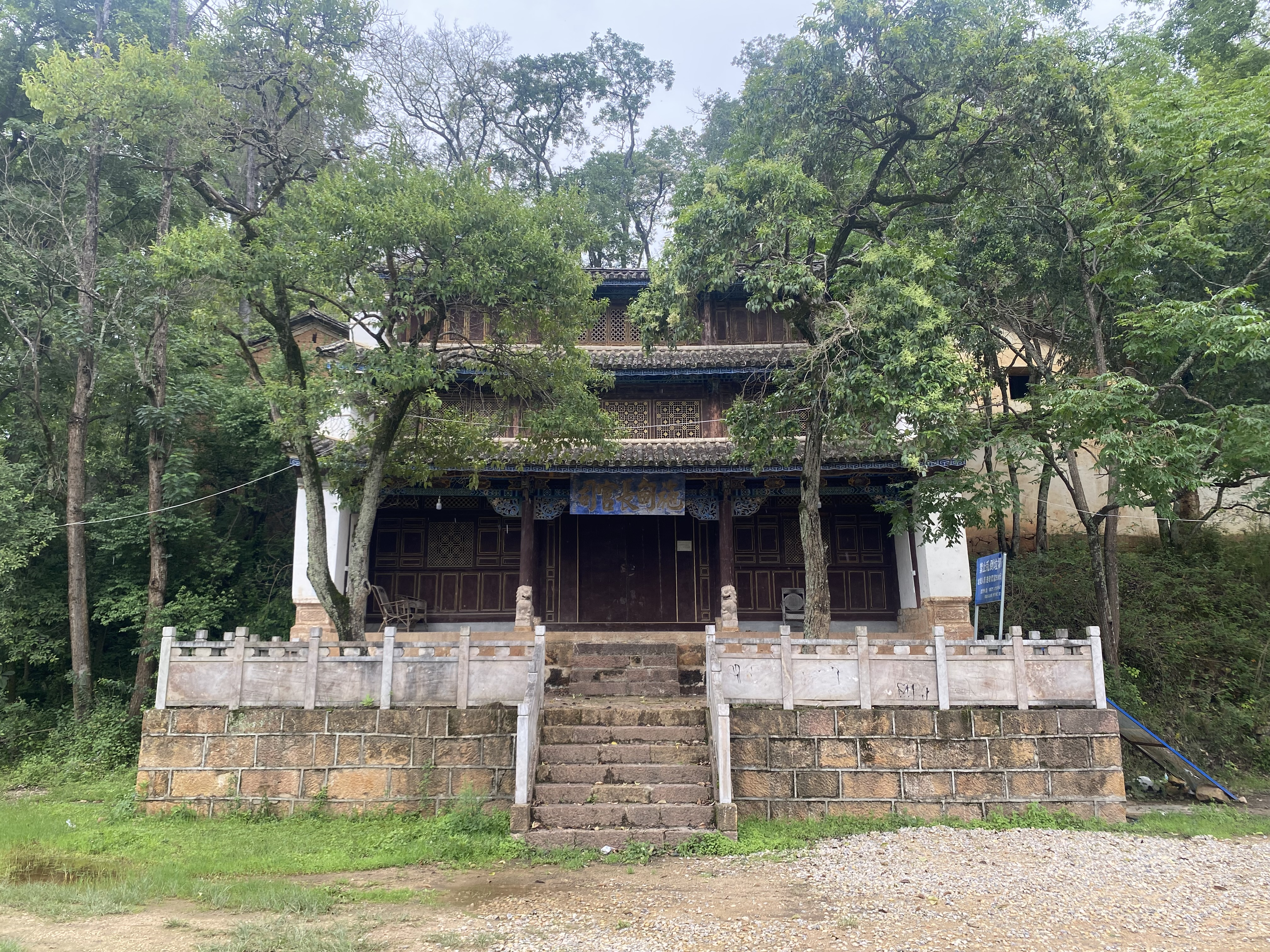
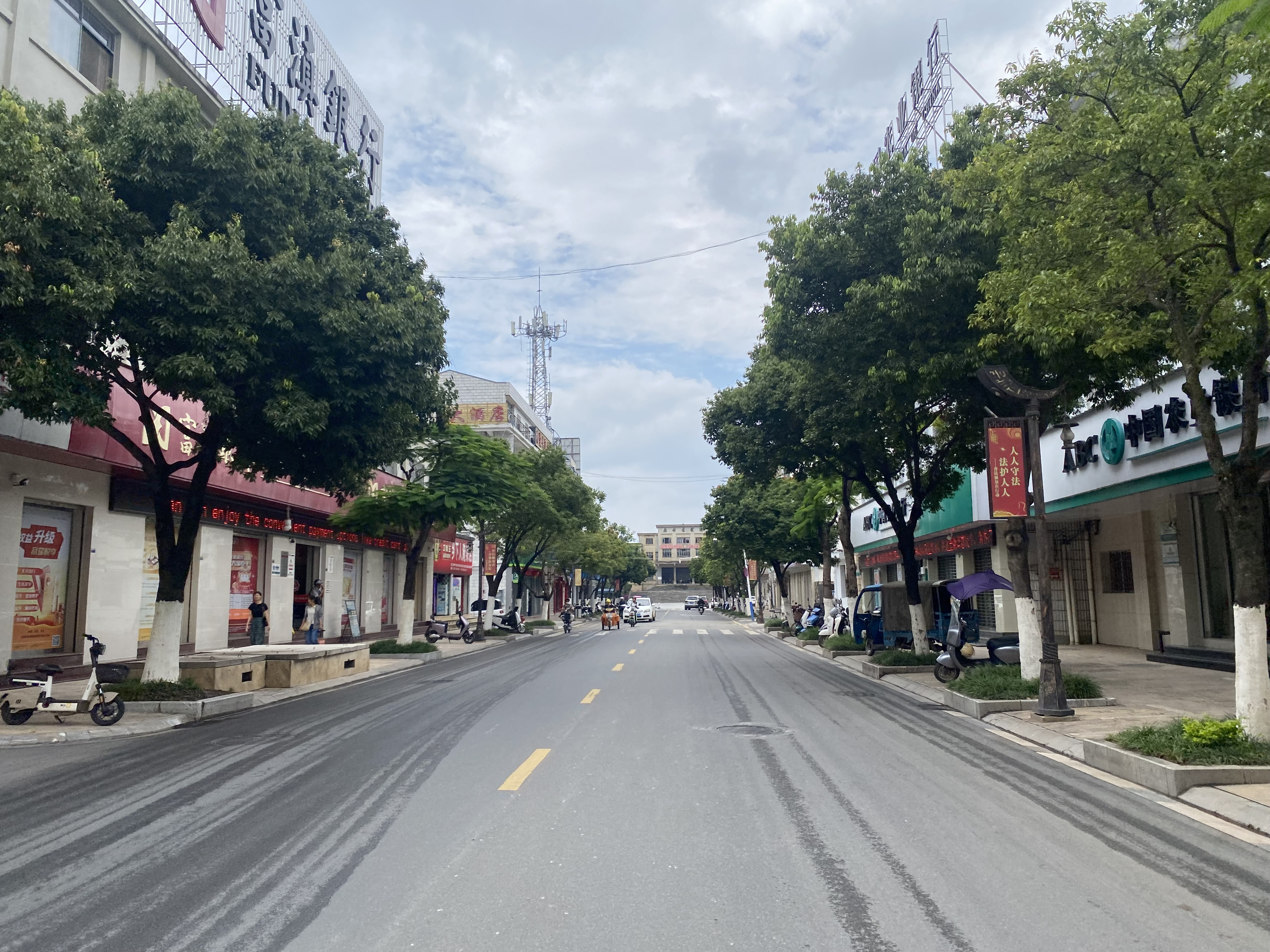
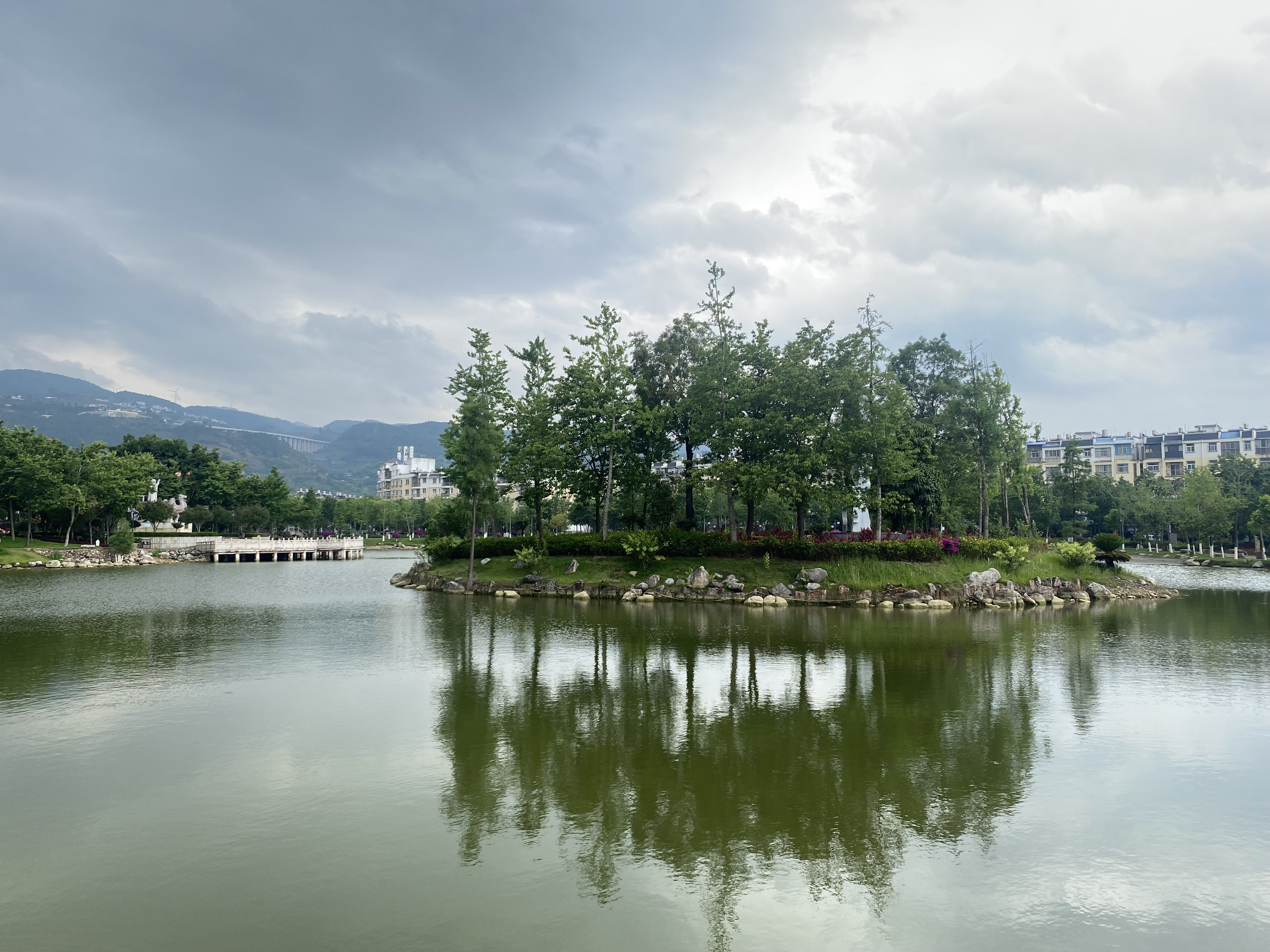
- Cityscape of county town Cyan Ox and White Horse Square Former Shidian Tusi Chiefdom office Renmin Road Yuetan Park

- Location of Shidian County (red) and Baoshan City (pink) within Yunnan
- Country: People's Republic of China
- Province: Yunnan
- Prefecture: Baoshan City

Area
  - Total: 2,009 km^{2} (776 sq mi)

Population
  - Total: 330,000
  - Density: 160/km^{2} (430/sq mi)
- Time zone: UTC+8 (CST)
- Postal code: 678200
- Area code: 0875
- Website: www.ynsd.gov.cn

Shidian County (Chinese: 施甸县; pinyin: Shīdiàn Xiàn) is under the administration of the prefecture-level city of Baoshan, in the west of Yunnan province, China. Its seat is the town of Dianyang (甸阳镇).

== Administrative divisions ==
Shidian County has 5 towns, 6 townships and 2 ethnic townships.

5 towns

- Dianyang (甸阳镇)
- Youwang (由旺镇)
- Yaoguan (姚关镇)
- Renhe (仁和镇)
- Taiping (太平镇)

6 townships

- Wanxing (万兴乡)
- Jiufang (酒房乡)
- Jiucheng (旧城乡)
- Laomai (老麦乡)
- Heyuan (何元乡)
- Shuichang (水长乡)

2 ethnic townships

- Bailang Yi and Bulang (摆榔彝族布朗族乡)
- Mulaoyuan Bulang and Yi (木老元布朗族彝族乡)

== Ethnic groups ==
According to the Shidian County Gazetteer (1997:544), ethnic Bulang (autonyms Wu 乌, Aiwu 埃乌, Ben people 本族) are found in Mulaoyuan Township (木老元乡) and Bailang Township (摆榔乡); in the villages of Hazhai (哈寨), Upper Mulaoyuan (上木老元), Lower Mulaoyuan (下木老元), Dazhong (大中), and Jianshan (尖山); and in Dazhai (大寨), Doupo Village (陡坡村), town of Yaoguan (姚关镇).

== Climate ==
Climate data for Shidian, elevation 1,471 m (4,826 ft), (1991–2020 normals, extremes 1981–present)
Month	Jan	Feb	Mar	Apr	May	Jun	Jul	Aug	Sep	Oct	Nov	Dec	Year
Record high °C (°F)	23.4 (74.1)	27.1 (80.8)	30.0 (86.0)	31.6 (88.9)	32.9 (91.2)	33.0 (91.4)	32.4 (90.3)	32.9 (91.2)	31.9 (89.4)	30.9 (87.6)	28.2 (82.8)	24.1 (75.4)	33.0 (91.4)
Mean daily maximum °C (°F)	18.9 (66.0)	20.7 (69.3)	23.7 (74.7)	25.8 (78.4)	27.0 (80.6)	27.3 (81.1)	26.8 (80.2)	27.4 (81.3)	26.9 (80.4)	25.0 (77.0)	22.1 (71.8)	19.5 (67.1)	24.3 (75.7)
Daily mean °C (°F)	10.5 (50.9)	12.8 (55.0)	16.0 (60.8)	18.7 (65.7)	21.1 (70.0)	22.6 (72.7)	22.3 (72.1)	22.2 (72.0)	21.2 (70.2)	18.8 (65.8)	14.5 (58.1)	11.2 (52.2)	17.7 (63.8)
Mean daily minimum °C (°F)	4.0 (39.2)	6.0 (42.8)	9.2 (48.6)	12.5 (54.5)	16.4 (61.5)	19.3 (66.7)	19.5 (67.1)	19.1 (66.4)	17.9 (64.2)	14.9 (58.8)	9.4 (48.9)	5.3 (41.5)	12.8 (55.0)
Record low °C (°F)	−3.2 (26.2)	−2.3 (27.9)	−0.1 (31.8)	4.9 (40.8)	8.9 (48.0)	14.2 (57.6)	13.7 (56.7)	14.1 (57.4)	10.0 (50.0)	6.4 (43.5)	1.7 (35.1)	−2.4 (27.7)	−3.2 (26.2)
Average precipitation mm (inches)	26.0 (1.02)	24.2 (0.95)	29.9 (1.18)	57.8 (2.28)	98.9 (3.89)	115.8 (4.56)	183.2 (7.21)	186.3 (7.33)	117.0 (4.61)	91.9 (3.62)	29.6 (1.17)	9.4 (0.37)	970 (38.19)
Average precipitation days (≥ 0.1 mm)	4.0	4.9	7.4	11.3	14.3	18.8	23.5	20.6	16.1	12.5	5.1	2.7	141.2
Average relative humidity (%)	66	60	56	60	67	74	79	80	78	77	73	71	70
Mean monthly sunshine hours	226.4	211.8	230.1	216.3	197.1	134.3	103.8	132.3	145.9	171.0	204.9	219.8	2,193.7
Percentage possible sunshine	68	66	62	56	48	33	25	33	40	48	63	67	51
Source: China Meteorological Administrationall-time November high
