= Chinese Farmers' Harvest Festival =

The Chinese Farmers' Harvest Festival is a festival established by China on June 21, 2018, and is held annually on the autumnal equinox of the lunar calendar.

== History ==
The festival was applied for by the Ministry of Agriculture and Rural Affairs in 2018 and was approved by the State Council of China on June 21 of the same year, becoming the first national-level festival established for farmers in China. The Agriculture and Rural Affairs Channel of China Central Television also started broadcasting on the Farmers' Harvest Festival in 2019.
