= Baoshan, Yunnan =

Baoshan 保山市
- Prefecture-level city
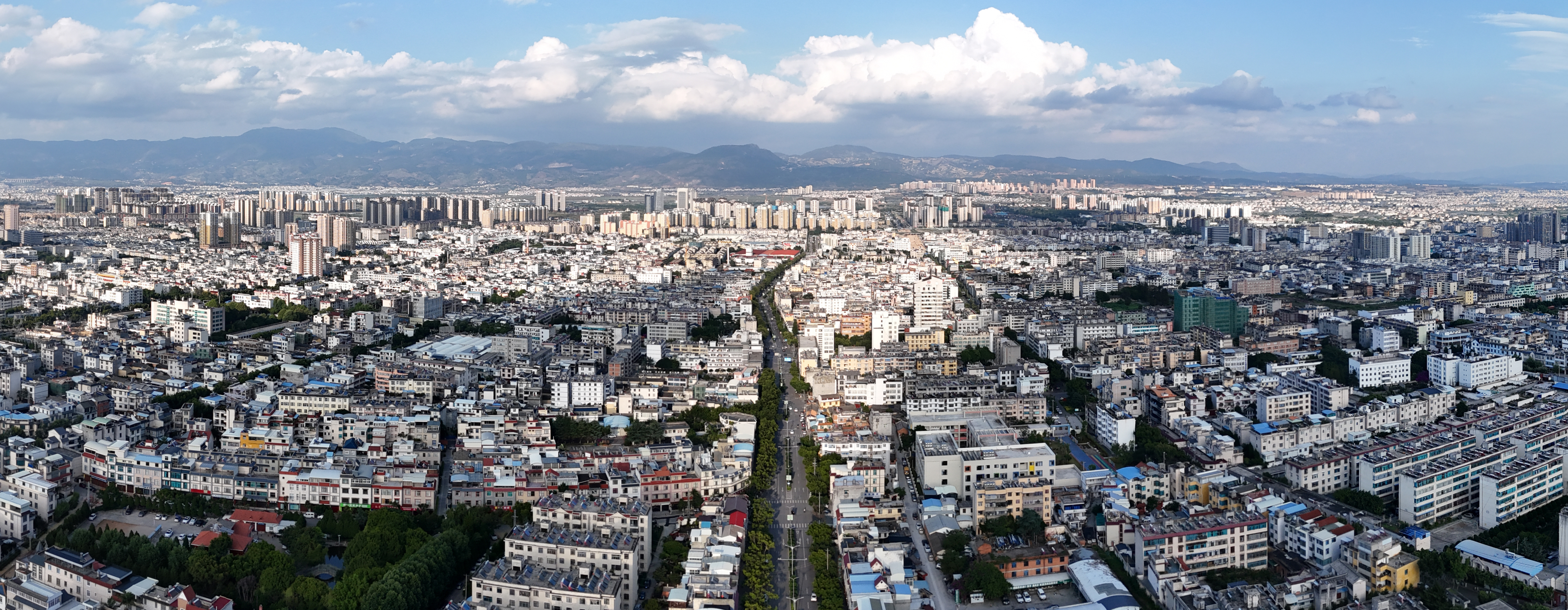
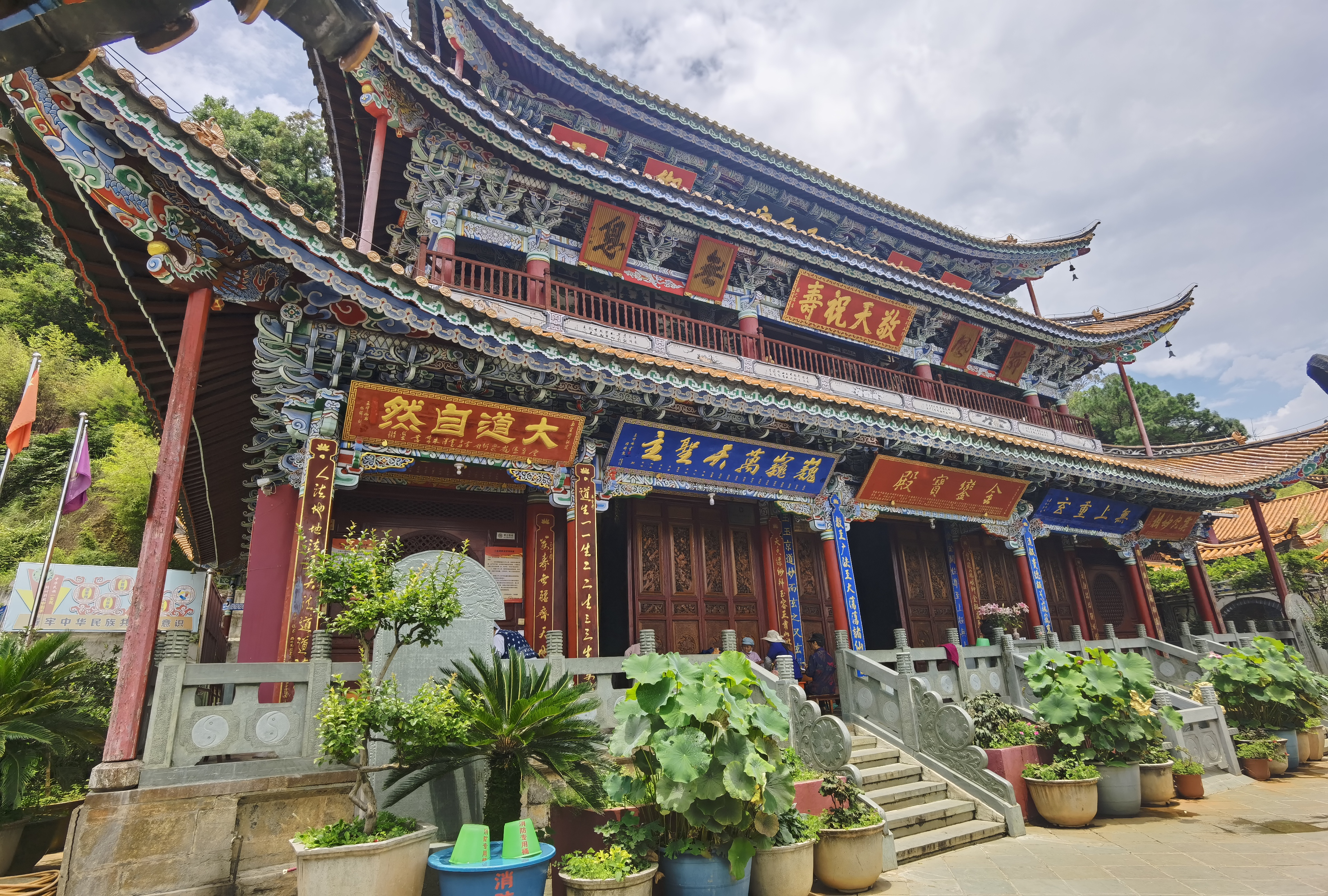
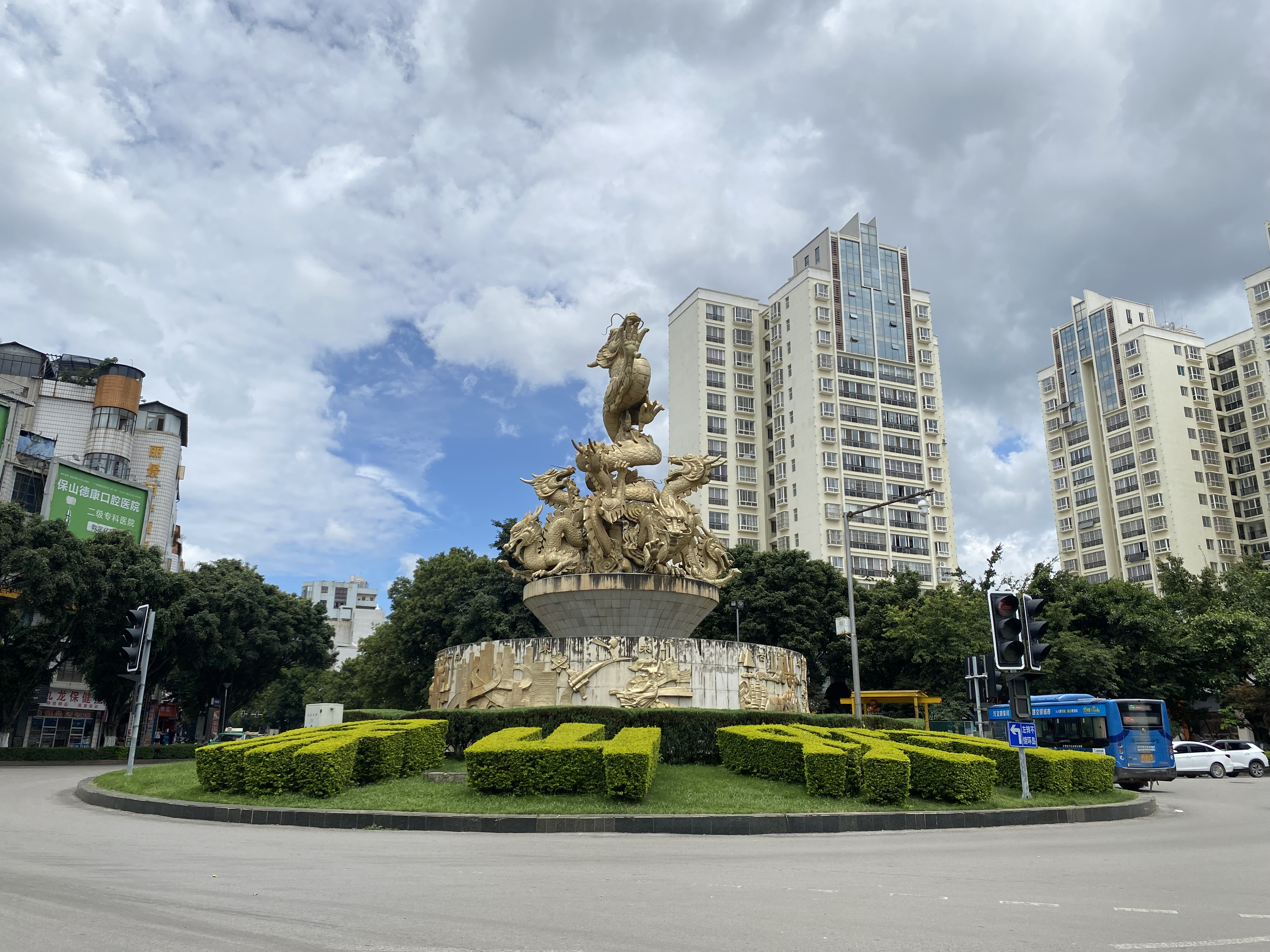
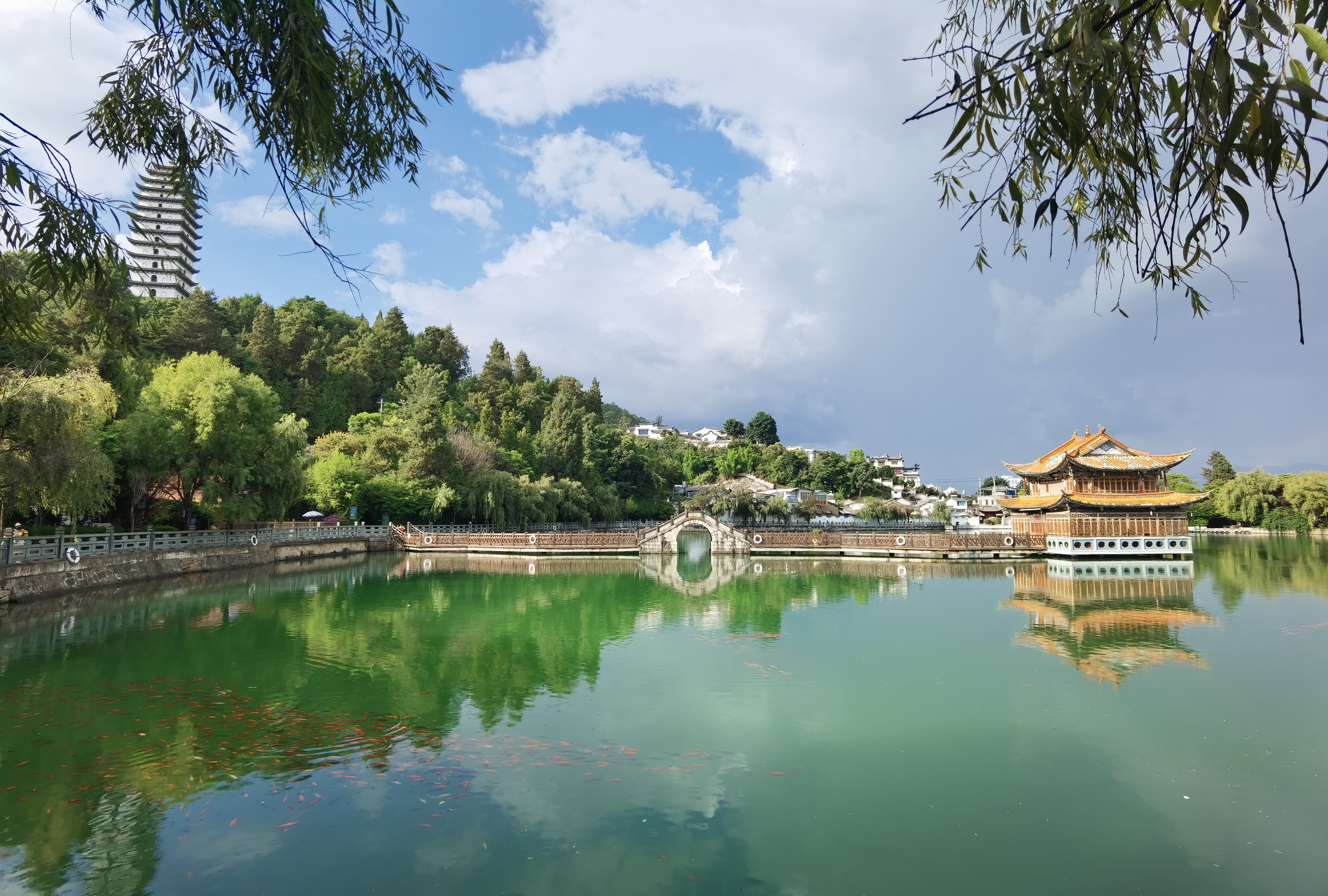
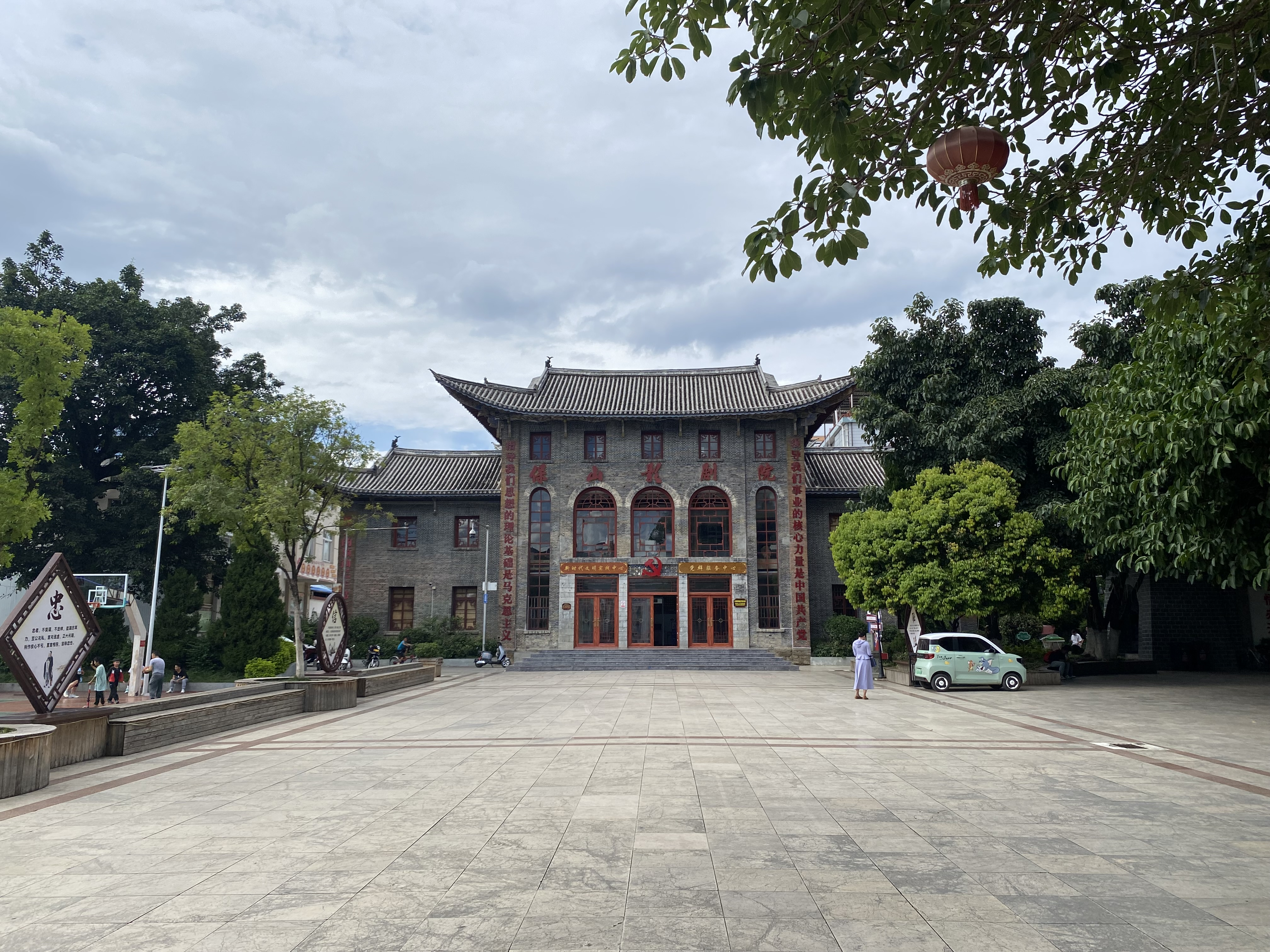
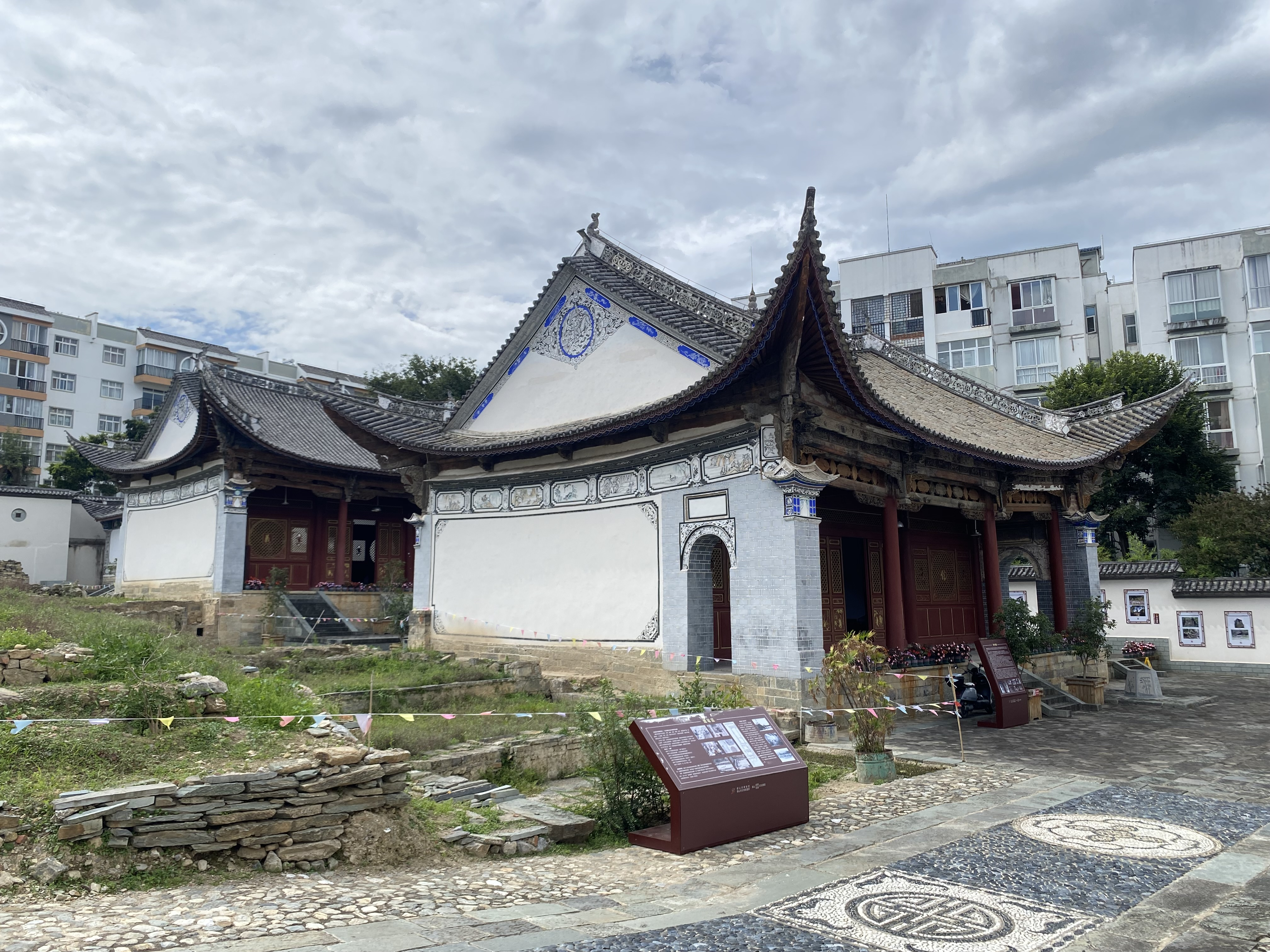
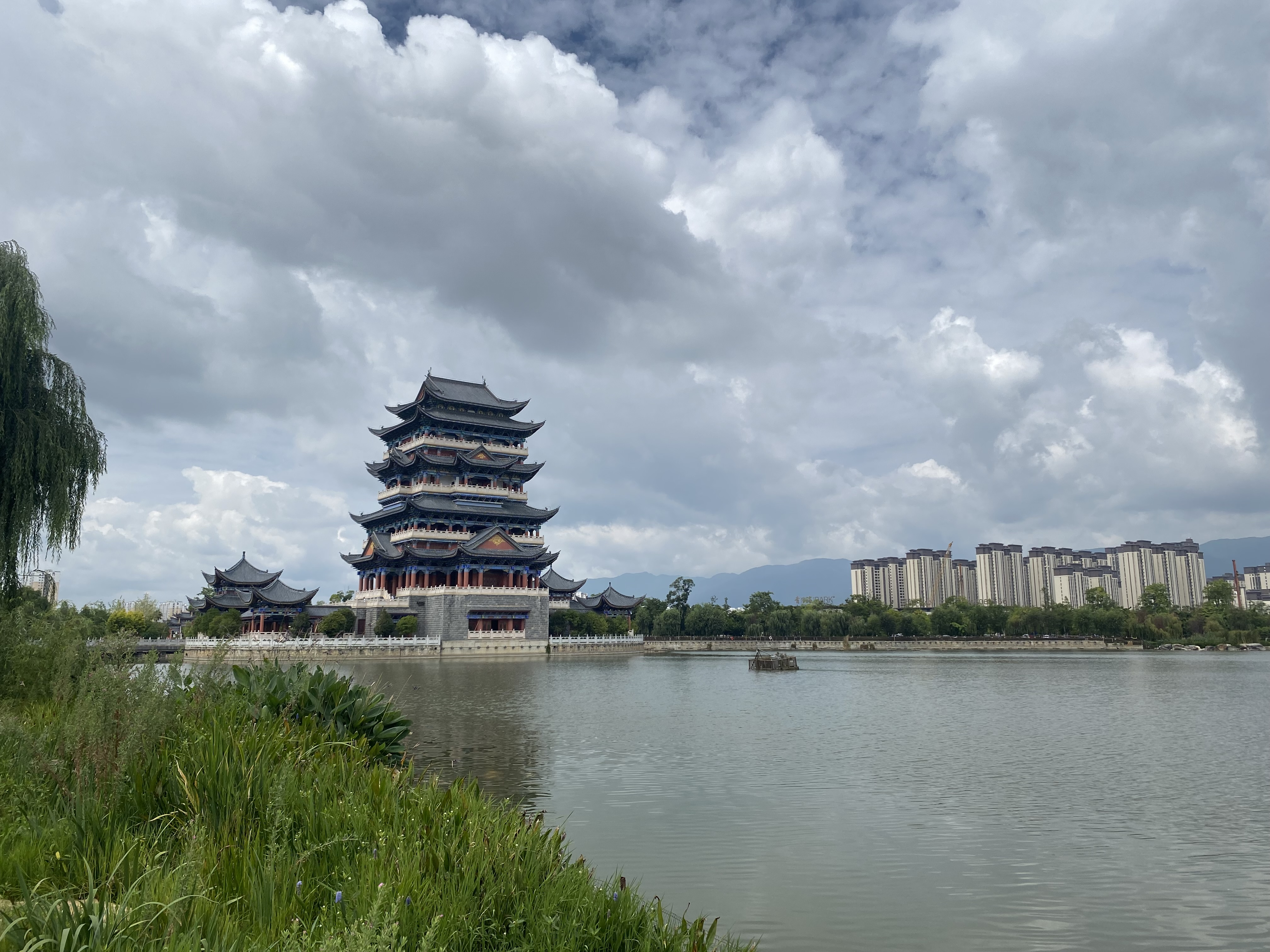
- Downtown skyline Jade Emperor Pavilion Nine Dragons Sculpture Yiluochi Park Baoxiu Square Tengyang Guildhall Qinghua Lake

- Location of Baoshan in Yunnan
- Coordinates (Baoshan municipal government): 25°06′43″N 99°09′40″E
- Country: People's Republic of China
- Province: Yunnan
- Admin HQ: Longyang

Area
  - Total: 19,064.6 km^{2} (7,360.9 sq mi)
- Elevation: 1,677 m (5,502 ft)

Population (2010)
  - Total: 2,506,491
  - Density: 131.474/km^{2} (340.515/sq mi)

GDP
  - Total: CN¥ 126.2 billion US$ 18.6 billion
  - Per capita: CN¥ 52,438; US$ 7,734
- Time zone: UTC+8 (China Standard)
- Postal code: 678000
- Area code: 0875
- ISO 3166 code: CN-YN-05
- Vehicle registration: 云M
- Website: www.baoshan.gov.cn

Baoshan (Chinese: 保山; pinyin: Bǎoshān; Burmese: ပေါက်ရှန်), historically also Yongchang (Chinese: 永昌; pinyin: Yǒngchāng), is a prefecture-level city in western Yunnan Province, People's Republic of China. Baoshan is the second-biggest metropolitan area in western Yunnan after Dali.

== Geography and climate ==
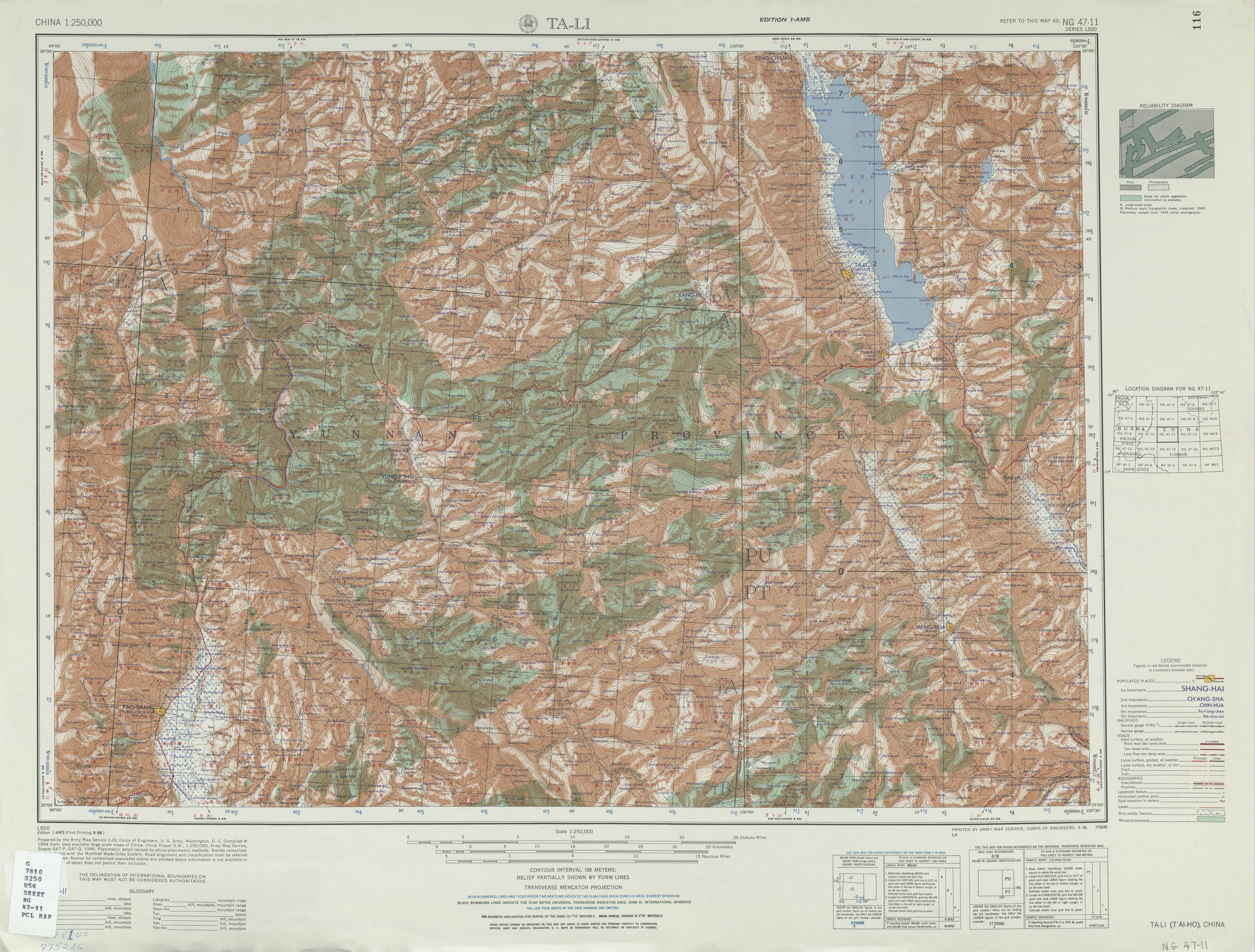
Map including Baoshan (labeled as PAO-SHAN (YUNG-CH'ANG) (Walled) 保山 (永昌)) (AMS, 1954)

Baoshan is located between the border of Burma and the Lancang river (Mekong); specifically it borders the Burmese states of Kachin to the northwest and Shan to the south. The Nujiang (Salween River) flows through the entire length of the prefecture, north to south.

Tempered by the low latitude and moderate elevation, Baoshan has a mild subtropical highland climate (Köppen Cwb), with short, mild, dry winters and warm, rainy summers. Frost may occur in winter but the days still generally warm up to around 16 to 17 °C (61 to 63 °F), with a January average of 9.1 °C (48.4 °F). The warmest month is June, which averages 21.5 °C (70.7 °F). Nearly three quarters of the annual rainfall occurs from June to October.

Climate data for Baoshan, elevation 1,652 m (5,420 ft), (1991–2020 normals, extremes 1971–present)
Month	Jan	Feb	Mar	Apr	May	Jun	Jul	Aug	Sep	Oct	Nov	Dec	Year
Record high °C (°F)	22.4 (72.3)	25.4 (77.7)	28.9 (84.0)	30.0 (86.0)	32.4 (90.3)	32.3 (90.1)	31.3 (88.3)	31.9 (89.4)	30.1 (86.2)	29.4 (84.9)	26.2 (79.2)	22.4 (72.3)	32.4 (90.3)
Mean daily maximum °C (°F)	17.4 (63.3)	19.3 (66.7)	22.3 (72.1)	24.5 (76.1)	25.9 (78.6)	26.5 (79.7)	25.8 (78.4)	26.4 (79.5)	25.7 (78.3)	23.9 (75.0)	20.8 (69.4)	18.1 (64.6)	23.1 (73.5)
Daily mean °C (°F)	9.7 (49.5)	11.8 (53.2)	14.9 (58.8)	17.6 (63.7)	20.2 (68.4)	21.9 (71.4)	21.6 (70.9)	21.5 (70.7)	20.5 (68.9)	18.2 (64.8)	13.8 (56.8)	10.4 (50.7)	16.8 (62.3)
Mean daily minimum °C (°F)	3.5 (38.3)	5.2 (41.4)	8.4 (47.1)	11.7 (53.1)	15.5 (59.9)	18.7 (65.7)	18.9 (66.0)	18.6 (65.5)	17.3 (63.1)	14.4 (57.9)	8.8 (47.8)	4.7 (40.5)	12.1 (53.9)
Record low °C (°F)	−3.8 (25.2)	−2.6 (27.3)	−1 (30)	2.7 (36.9)	7.4 (45.3)	12.4 (54.3)	13.1 (55.6)	13.0 (55.4)	10.7 (51.3)	5.5 (41.9)	0.7 (33.3)	−2.3 (27.9)	−3.8 (25.2)
Average precipitation mm (inches)	23.2 (0.91)	21.0 (0.83)	30.6 (1.20)	45.4 (1.79)	90.1 (3.55)	100.4 (3.95)	173.6 (6.83)	196.2 (7.72)	145.9 (5.74)	102.7 (4.04)	26.8 (1.06)	8.3 (0.33)	964.2 (37.95)
Average precipitation days (≥ 0.1 mm)	3.6	5.0	7.7	10.7	12.0	15.2	21.4	21.3	16.1	12.2	4.5	2.6	132.3
Average relative humidity (%)	65	60	57	61	67	73	79	80	79	76	72	69	70
Mean monthly sunshine hours	247.1	232.8	254.9	236.6	221.9	162.6	116.2	144.1	159.9	191.7	229.2	239.8	2,436.8
Percentage possible sunshine	74	73	68	62	54	40	28	36	44	54	71	73	56
Source 1: China Meteorological Administration all-time Nov high
Source 2: Weather China

== Administrative divisions ==
The city-prefecture of Baoshan has jurisdiction over five subdivisions — a district, one county-level city and three counties.

Map
Name	Hanzi	Hanyu Pinyin	Population (2010)	Area (km^{2})	Density (/km^{2})
Longyang District	隆阳区	Lóngyáng Qū	935,618	5,011	187
Tengchong City	腾冲市	Téngchōng Shì	644,765	5,845	110
Shidian County	施甸县	Shīdiàn Xiàn	305,223	2,009	152
Longling County	龙陵县	Lónglíng Xiàn	277,319	2,884	96
Changning County	昌宁县	Chāngníng Xiàn	343,566	3,888	88

Tengyue, the other major populated area in the county, successfully lobbied for and achieved city status in 2015-16 and is currently in the process of separating itself and the surrounding Tengchong area from Baoshan administratively.

== Demography ==
The prefecture has about 2.5 million inhabitants. At the end of 2024, the total resident population is 2.399 million, with an overall downward trend.

=== Ethnic groups ===
Among the resident population, the population of Han is 2,248,140, accounting for 89.69%; the population of ethnic minorities is 258,351, accounting for 10.31%.

Ethnic Composition of Baoshan City (November 2010)
National name	Han	Yi	Bai	Dai	Lisu	Hui	Miao	Bulang	Wa	Jingpo	Others	Total
Population	2248140	81524	45890	43049	34423	12436	10580	9834	4833	4204	11578	2506491
Proportion of total population (%)	89.69	3.25	1.83	1.72	1.37	0.50	0.42	0.39	0.19	0.17	0.46	100
Proportion of minority population (%)	---	31.56	17.76	16.66	13.32	4.81	4.10	3.81	1.87	1.63	4.48	---

==== Bulang ====
According to the Baoshan Ethnic Gazetteer (2006:337), ethnic Bulang are distributed in the following villages within Baoshan City.

- Shidian County
  - Mulaoyuan (木老元乡): Mulaoyuan (木老元), Hazhai (哈寨), Dadi (大地), Longtang (龙塘)
  - Bailang Township (摆榔乡): Jici (鸡茨), Dazhong (大中), Jianshan (尖山)
  - Yaoguan Township (姚关乡): Duopo (陡坡)
  - Jiufang Township (酒房乡): Yakou (哑口)
- Changning County
  - Gengga Township (更嘎乡): Baicaolin (百草林), Dachushui (大出水)
  - Kasi Township (卡斯镇)
    - Xingu Village (新谷村): Guban (谷板), Zhongzhai (中寨)
    - Kasi Village (卡斯村): Shuanglong (双龙), Yingbaizhai (应百寨), Ergoudi (二沟地)

==== De'ang ====
The Yaojing (尧净), a subgroup of the De'ang, are located in Baizhai (白寨), Laxian (拉线), and Dagoubian (大沟边) of Mangyan Village (芒颜村) and Shiti Village (石梯村) in Lujiang Township (潞江乡), Longyang District (Baoshan Ethnic Gazetteer 2006:490-491).

== Transport ==
Baoshan lies on the main road from Ruili on the Burmese border to Kunming. The Baoshan−Kunming section is completed highway, and the Baoshan-Ruili part was completed in 2016, finalizing the highway net crossing Yunnan east-to-west. It is the first finished highway between China and Myanmar.

Baoshan Yunrui Airport (IATA: BSD, ICAO: ZPBS) has daily flights to and from Kunming.

The currently under construction Dali–Ruili railway will pass through Baoshan. Baoshan railway station will handle passenger services while Baoshan North will handle freight.

== Notable people ==
- Gui Haichao — first Chinese civilian to enter space
- Dianxi Xiaoge — Chinese Food Vlogger and YouTuber

== See also ==
- Three Parallel Rivers of Yunnan Protected Areas — UNESCO World Heritage Site
- Gaoligong Mountain
