= Meitu =

Chinese technology company

Meitu Inc.
- Native name: 厦门美图网科技有限公司（美图shaj
- Type: Public
- Traded as: SEHK: 1357
- Industry: Consumer electronics
- Founded: 2008; 18 years ago
- Headquarters: Xiamen, China
- Products: Smartphones, Software, Air conditioner

Chinese name
- Simplified Chinese: 美图公司
- Traditional Chinese: 美圖公司
- Literal meaning: Beautiful Picture
Transcriptions
Standard Mandarin
- Hanyu Pinyin: Měitú Gōngsī

Xiamen Meitu Network Technology Co., Ltd.
- Simplified Chinese: 厦门美图网科技有限公司
- Traditional Chinese: 廈門美圖網科技有限公司
Transcriptions
Standard Mandarin
- Hanyu Pinyin: Xiàmén Měitú Wǎng Kējì Yǒuxiàn Gōngsī
- Website: http://corp.meitu.com/en/

Meitu Inc. is a Chinese technology company established in 2008 and headquartered in Xiamen, Fujian. It makes smartphones and selfie apps.

== Financials ==
On August 18, 2025, Meitu Inc. (1357.HK) announced H1 2025 financial report: total revenue reached RMB 1.8 billion, a YoY increase of 12.3%. Adjusted net profit attributable to owners of the company rose 71.3% YoY to RMB 467 million.

== Controversy ==
On January 20, 2017, CNN reported Meitu apps are collecting information about users for advertising purposes, and sends that data back to servers in China. But Meitu denied CNN's report that the app is leaking users' privacy. The company said collecting users' data is to "optimize app performance, its effects and features, and to better understand our consumer engagement with in-app advertisements" in an official statement.

Beauty standards in China have become linked to Meitu. It has become common practice in China for people, largely women, to take their Meitu edited pictures to plastic surgeons as examples for what they want to look like.

In June 2020, the Government of India banned Meitu app with 58 other Chinese origin apps citing data and privacy issues. The border tensions in 2020 between India and China further played a role in the ban.
