= Longling County =

Longling County 龙陵县
- County
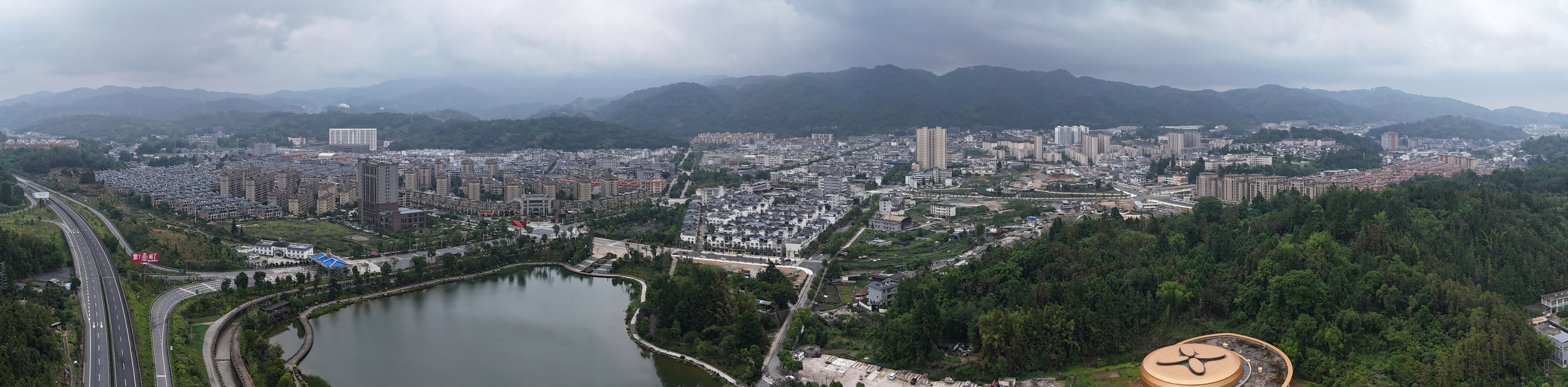
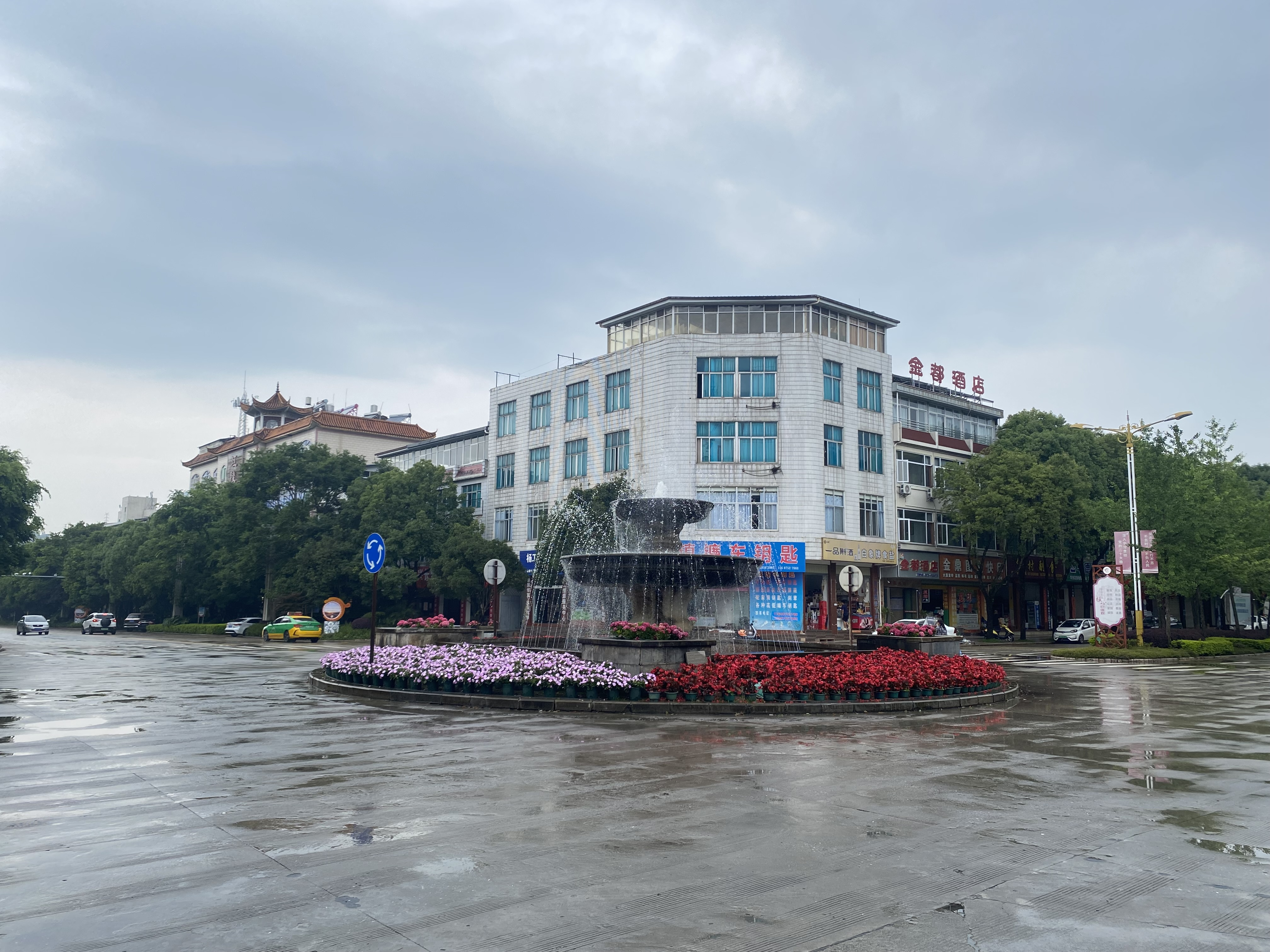
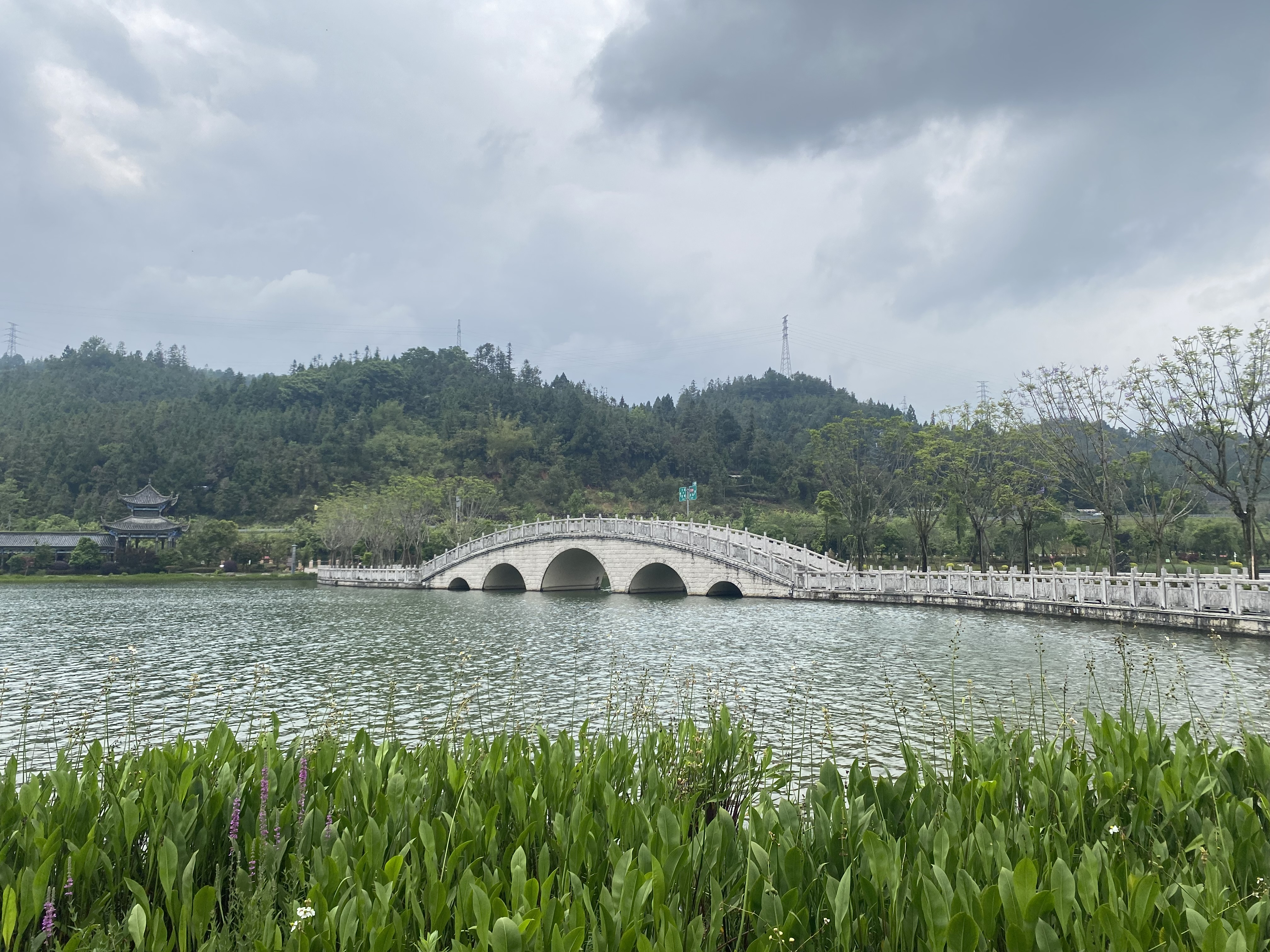
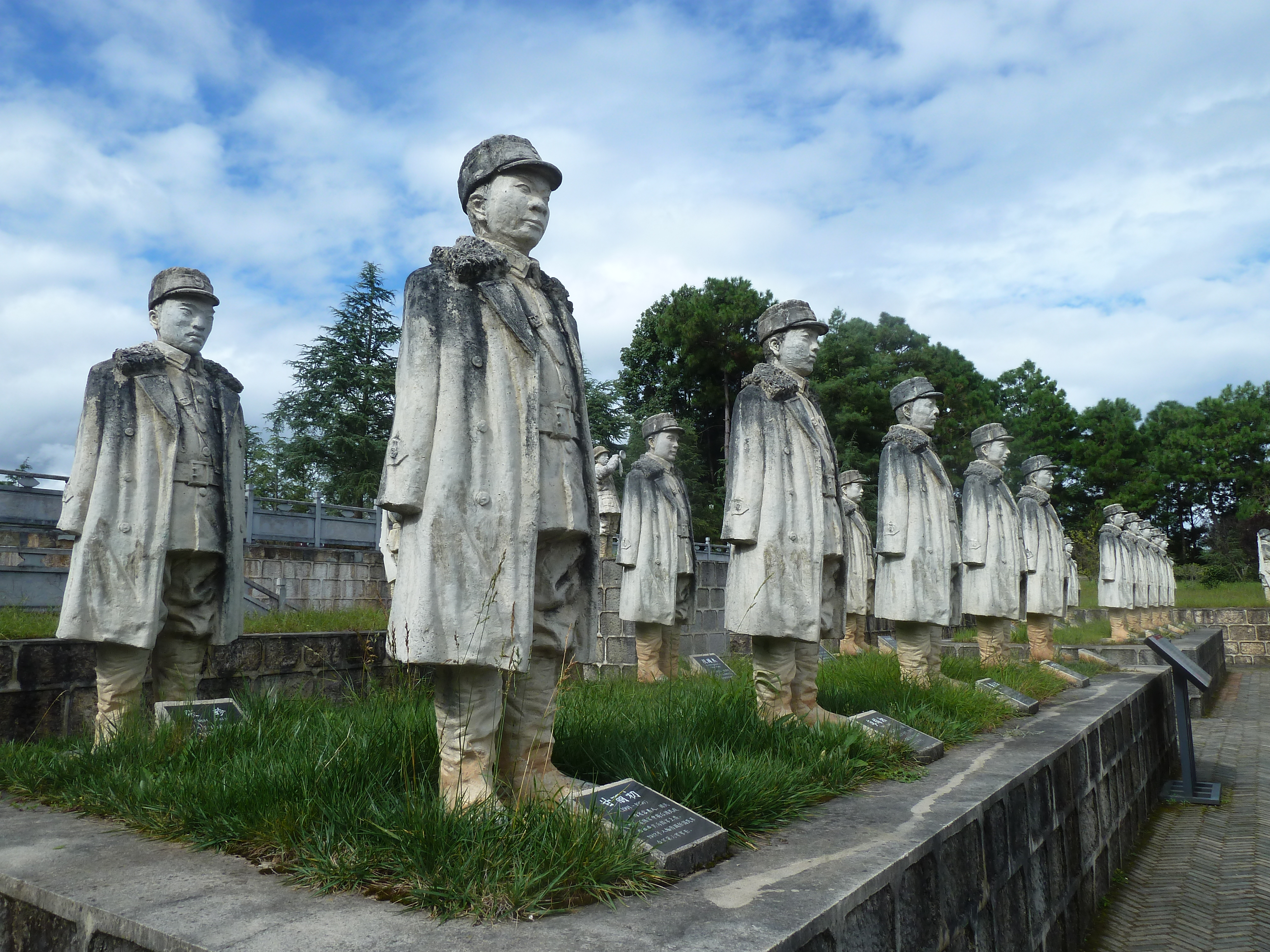
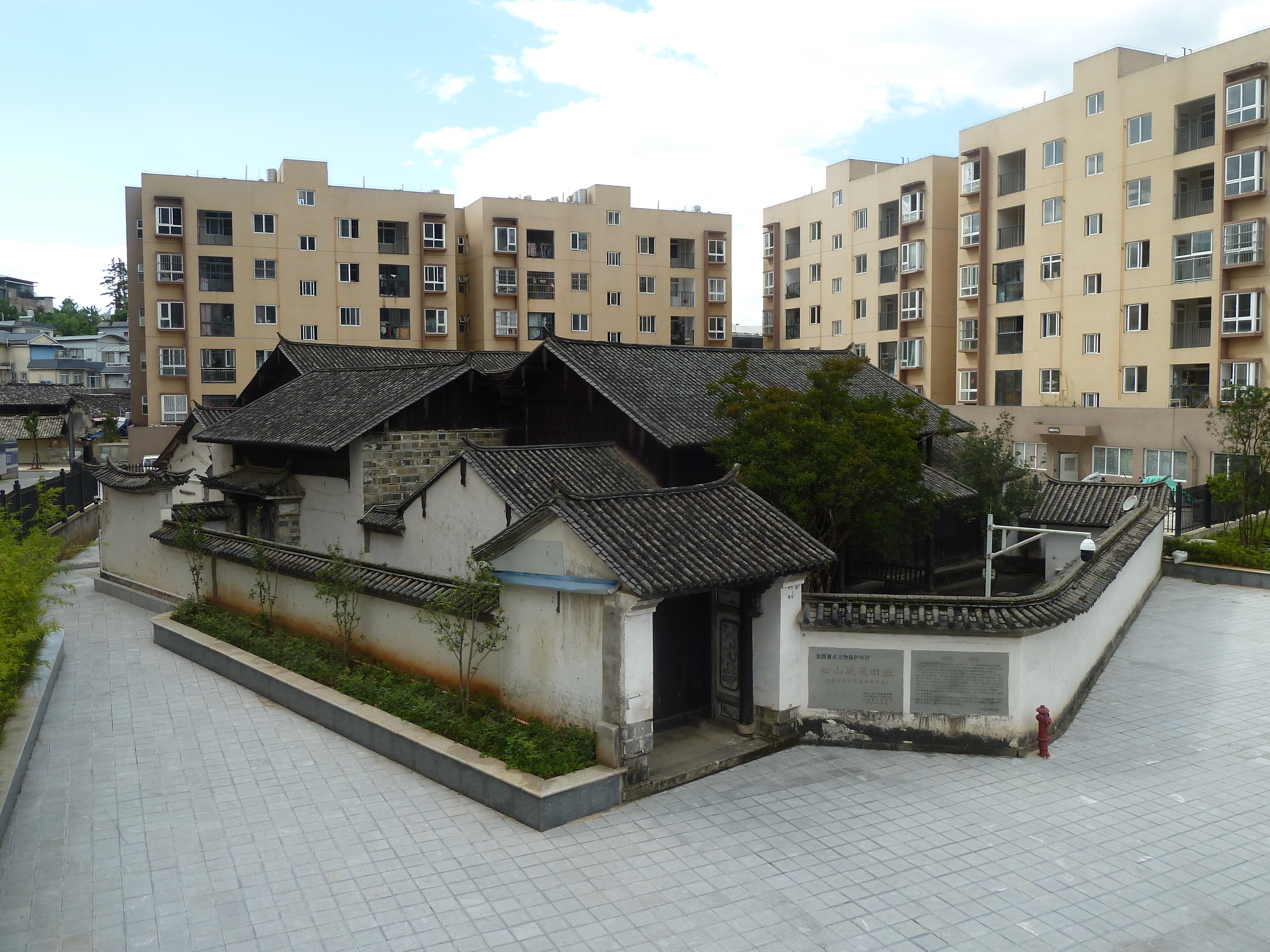
- Cityscape of county town Main street intersection Longshan Lake Park Songshan Battle Site Memorial Park Former site of Dongjiagou Japanese Military Comfort Station

- Location of Longling County (red) and Baoshan City (pink) within Yunnan

- Location of the seat in Yunnan
- Coordinates: 24°38′18″N 98°50′23″E
- Country: People's Republic of China
- Province: Yunnan
- Prefecture: Baoshan City

Area
  - Total: 2,884 km^{2} (1,114 sq mi)

Population
  - Total: 270,000
  - Density: 94/km^{2} (240/sq mi)
- Postal code: 678300
- Area code: 0875
- Website: www.longling.gov.cn

Longling County (simplified Chinese: 龙陵县; traditional Chinese: 龍陵縣; pinyin: Lónglíng Xiàn) is a county in Baoshan City, in the west of Yunnan Province, China, bordering Burma's Shan State to the south.

Its capital is the large community Longshan (龙山镇).

The site of the Songshan Battlefield (松山战役旧址; 松山戰役舊址; Sōngshān zhànyì jiùzhǐ) (1944 during the Second Sino-Japanese War) has since 2006 been on the list of monuments of the People's Republic of China.

== Administrative divisions ==
Longling County has 5 towns, 4 townships and 1 ethnic township.

5 towns

- Longshan (龙山镇)
- Zhen'an (镇安镇)
- Mengnuo (勐糯镇)
- Lameng (腊勐镇)
- Xiangda (象达镇)

4 townships

- Longjiang (龙江乡)
- Bizhai (碧寨乡)
- Longxin (龙新乡)
- Pingda (平达乡)

1 ethnic township

- Mucheng Yi and Lisu (木城彝族傈僳族乡)

== Climate ==
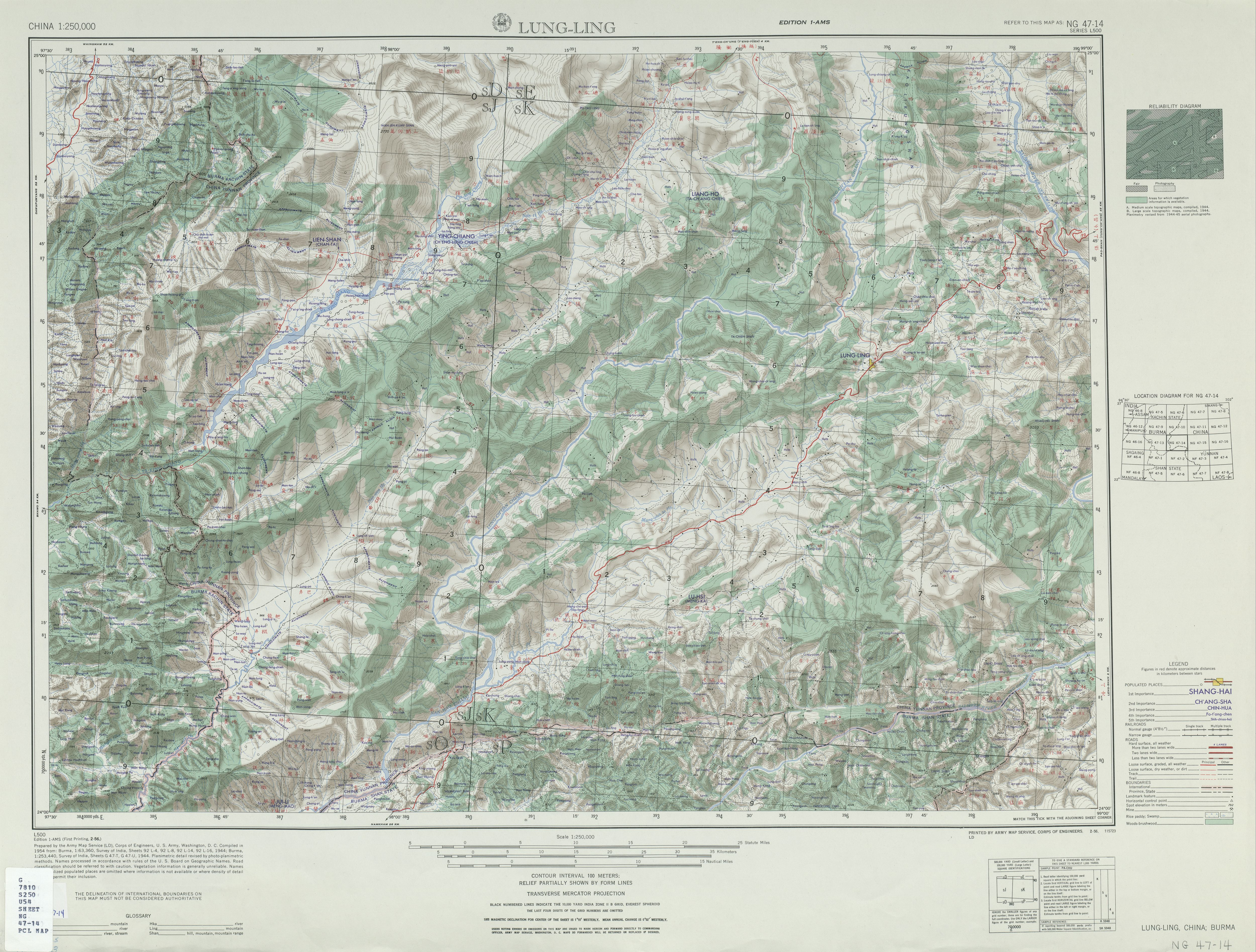
Longling (labelled as LUNG-LING 龍陵) (1954)

Climate data for Longling, elevation 1,528 m (5,013 ft), (1991–2020 normals, extremes 1981–present)
Month	Jan	Feb	Mar	Apr	May	Jun	Jul	Aug	Sep	Oct	Nov	Dec	Year
Record high °C (°F)	21.1 (70.0)	25.2 (77.4)	27.3 (81.1)	28.9 (84.0)	30.0 (86.0)	29.1 (84.4)	31.0 (87.8)	30.6 (87.1)	29.9 (85.8)	28.9 (84.0)	25.5 (77.9)	23.0 (73.4)	31.0 (87.8)
Mean daily maximum °C (°F)	16.8 (62.2)	18.6 (65.5)	21.8 (71.2)	23.8 (74.8)	24.2 (75.6)	23.7 (74.7)	23.3 (73.9)	24.4 (75.9)	24.5 (76.1)	23.0 (73.4)	20.3 (68.5)	17.7 (63.9)	21.8 (71.3)
Daily mean °C (°F)	7.8 (46.0)	9.5 (49.1)	12.6 (54.7)	15.6 (60.1)	18.5 (65.3)	20.2 (68.4)	20.1 (68.2)	20.4 (68.7)	19.6 (67.3)	17.1 (62.8)	12.6 (54.7)	9.0 (48.2)	15.3 (59.5)
Mean daily minimum °C (°F)	1.6 (34.9)	2.7 (36.9)	5.5 (41.9)	9.4 (48.9)	14.2 (57.6)	18.0 (64.4)	18.4 (65.1)	18.1 (64.6)	17.0 (62.6)	13.8 (56.8)	8.0 (46.4)	3.7 (38.7)	10.9 (51.6)
Record low °C (°F)	−3.9 (25.0)	−3.0 (26.6)	−1.5 (29.3)	1.6 (34.9)	7.6 (45.7)	13.3 (55.9)	12.6 (54.7)	13.3 (55.9)	9.3 (48.7)	3.7 (38.7)	0.8 (33.4)	−3.4 (25.9)	−3.9 (25.0)
Average precipitation mm (inches)	27.2 (1.07)	28.9 (1.14)	36.2 (1.43)	85.2 (3.35)	202.2 (7.96)	337.6 (13.29)	432.7 (17.04)	399.5 (15.73)	251.5 (9.90)	183.9 (7.24)	51.9 (2.04)	16.5 (0.65)	2,053.3 (80.84)
Average precipitation days (≥ 0.1 mm)	4.3	5.7	7.8	13.0	19.0	25.4	29.0	27.6	23.0	16.8	7.4	3.7	182.7
Average relative humidity (%)	82	78	75	78	84	90	92	91	90	88	86	85	85
Mean monthly sunshine hours	240.6	226.4	245.8	231.5	189.0	106.8	78.5	114.1	138.6	175.3	215.0	233.7	2,195.3
Percentage possible sunshine	72	71	66	60	46	26	19	29	38	49	66	71	51
Source: China Meteorological Administration all-time Nov high
