= Ms Yeah =

Chinese YouTube channel

Ms Yeah 办公室小野
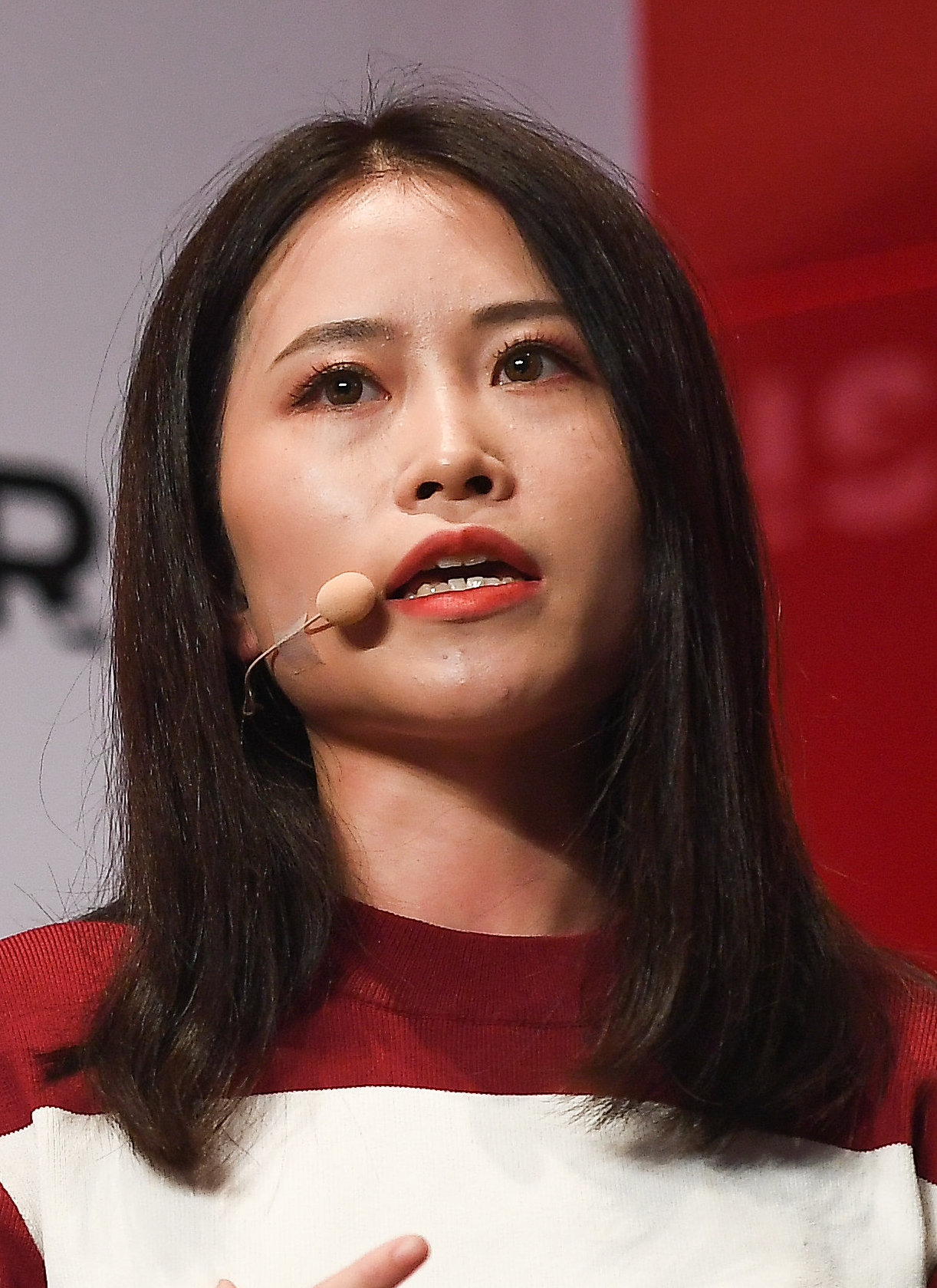
- Ms Yeah In 2018
- Born: Zhou Xiaohui (周晓慧); 23 July 1994 (age 31); Chengdu, Sichuan

YouTube information
- Channel: YouTube channel
- Years active: 2017–present
- Genres: Cooking show; How-to
- Subscribers: 14.1 million
- Views: 5.05 billion
- Last updated: 10 April 2026

Zhou Xiaohui (simplified Chinese: 周晓慧; traditional Chinese: 周曉慧), known professionally as Ms Yeah (Chinese: 小野), is a Chinese YouTuber. In each video, a dish, usually Chinese, is prepared using tools found in a typical office workspace. Her videos are characterized by lack of narration, voiceover, or conversation, which helped to popularize the channel abroad.

== Biography ==
Zhou was born in Chengdu. Growing up, she learned cooking from her father, who managed a hotel.

She holds a degree in choreography from Sichuan Normal University and a major in video directing. Her first job was an internship at Chengdu Radio & Television as a video director, followed by a job as a wedding planner until working for her current employer.

In 2016, Zhou landed a job at a video production company, where she was tasked to make short videos to promote braised vegetables. After seeing a video of someone using a curling iron to cook fatty beef slices, she and a co-worker filmed themselves using a clothes iron to cook beef, which went viral on Weibo.

She was eventually promoted to vice-president and team lead at her company.

== Popularity ==
Unusually for a Chinese celebrity, the channel is more popular overseas than with domestic viewers, having 2.8 million followers on Facebook compared to 2.55 million on Weibo as of July 2017. Due to lack of narration, the videos have almost no language barrier. Zhou said that because her background was in directing and choreography, she was not confident to speak in front of a camera.

Furthermore, Ms Yeah and the production team use English on foreign social media, and in public appearances she appears to be fluent in English. This may explain the videos' popularity abroad. As of September 2019, Ms Yeah has more than 7.51 million subscribers, making her one of the most successful Chinese YouTubers ever, despite the fact that access to YouTube has been restricted in China since 2008.

Some videos feature product placement; at a cost of 500,000 CNY, a product will be shown in the video.

Most of the food cooked in the videos are common Chinese dishes and not difficult to prepare per se. Ms Yeah has admitted that the final results often did not taste good, but the goal of her channel is not to teach viewers how to cook; hence there are no cooking instructions. As Ms Yeah stated herself, "I don't want to be a 'cooking teacher'. I don't want to teach you how to cook, and I don't want to teach the science of cooking. I just want to show you an attitude towards life. You can find the joy of life whenever and wherever you are."

In January 2024 Ms Yeah addressed why no new office cooking videos were published, saying she reached a 'creative bottleneck', felt unable to surpass the popularity of her previous content and stressed being an independent content creator. She since published videos of her enjoying her hobbies such as swimming, home cooking and arts and crafts.

== Viewer injuries ==
In 2019, two girls aged 12 and 14 from Shandong, were injured, one of them fatally, after allegedly attempting to copy one of Ms Yeah's videos. Ms Yeah paid a compensation for the hospital bills of the girls, but denied responsibility, as she warned users not to copy the videos, and the girl did not copy the exact method. Following the accident, she reportedly considered quitting the video series after netizens blamed her for being responsible for the girl's death, but after a one-month hiatus she continued uploading. The video that was reportedly imitated has since been removed from the channel.

== Personal life ==
On 1 November 2020, Zhou announced her marriage to her long-time boyfriend.
