= Azhaliism =

School of Chinese Buddhism

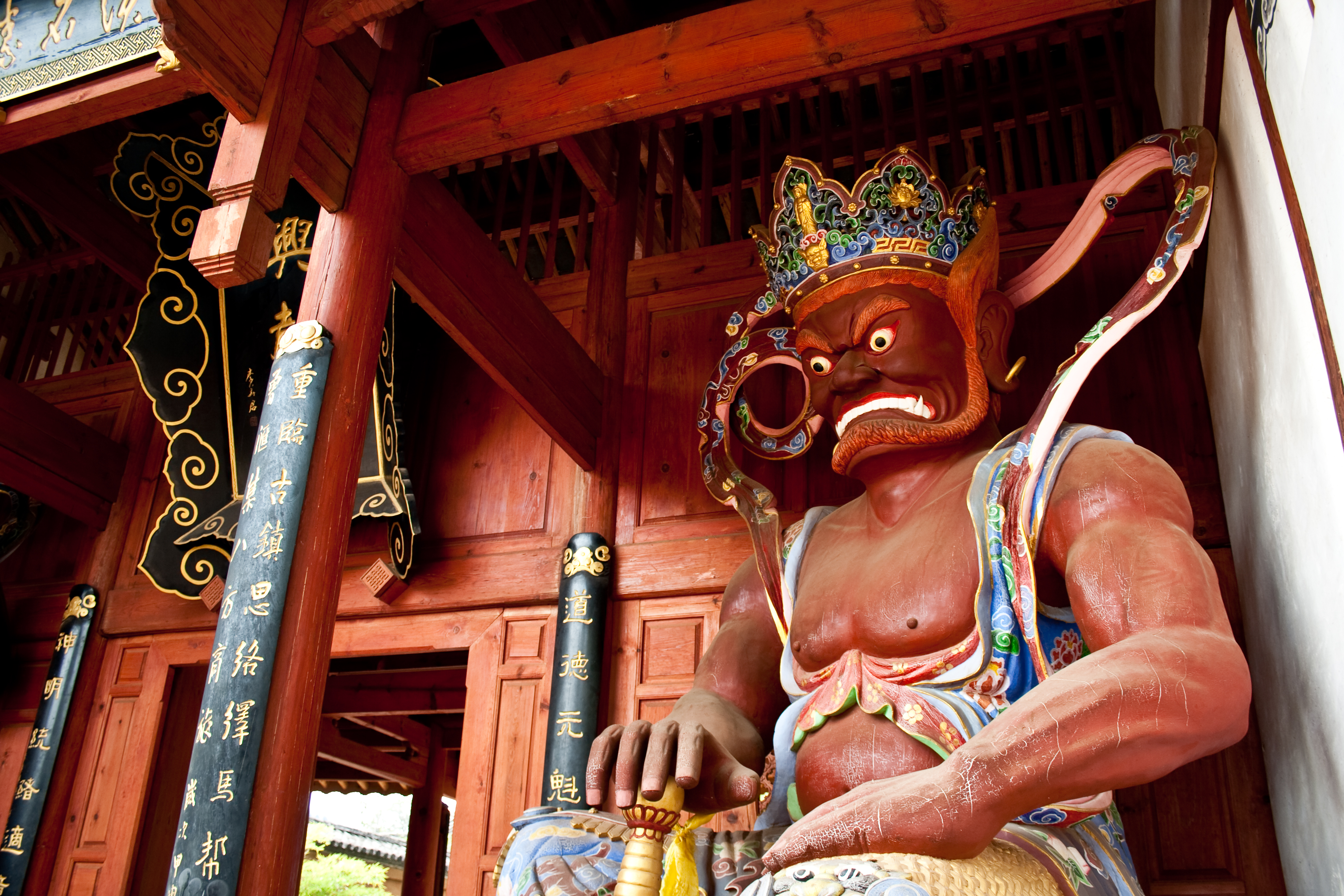
The Xingjiao Temple in Shaxi is a Ming dynasty Buddhist temple of the Bai people

Azhaliism (Chinese: 阿吒力教; pinyin: Āzhālìjiào), also known as Dianmi or Baimi, is a Vajrayana Buddhist religion practiced among the Bai people of Yunnan, China. The name comes from lay tantric priests called azhali (Sanskrit: acharyas) who are key figures in the religion, known for their use of spells and mantras.

== History ==
Azhali (Acharya) was a form of Tantric Buddhism that originated around 821-824 when a monk from India called Li Xian Maishun arrived in Nanzhao (653–902). More monks from India arrived in 825 and 828 and built a temple in Heqing. In 839, an acharya named Candragupta entered Nanzhao. Quanfengyou appointed him as a state mentor and married his sister Yueying to Candragupta. It was said that he meditated in a thatched cottage of Fengding Mountain in the east of Heqing, and became an "enlightened God." He established an altar to propagate tantric doctrines in Changdong Mountain of Tengchong. Candragupta continued to propagate tantric doctrines, translated the tantric scripture The Rites of the Great Consecration, and engaged in water conservancy projects. He left for his homeland later on and possibly went to Tibet to propagate his teachings. When he returned to Nanzhao, he built Wuwei Temple.

In 851, an inscription in Jianchuan dedicated images to Maitreya and Amitabha. The Nanzhao king Quanfengyou commissioned Chinese architects from the Tang dynasty to build the Three Pagodas. The last king of Nanzhao established Buddhism as the official state religion. In the Nanzhao Tushu juan, the Nanzhao Buddhist elite are depicted with light skin whereas the people who oppose Buddhism are depicted as short and dark skinned.

The Three Pagoda Temple 三塔寺 controlled the Ranggong Chapel 讓公庵, which the Gao family constructed during the Nanzhao kingdom period. Friends of the famous Neo-Confucian scholar Li Yuanyang 李元陽 (1497–1580) supported the chapel by donating funds to buy farm land for its maintenance as late as the Jiajing reign period (1522–1566). According to tradition, seven holy monks 聖僧 constructed Biaoleng Temple during the Nanzhao kingdom period. A stele dated 1430 (Xuande 5) records that Zhao Yanzhen 趙彥貞 from a local family of officials renovated Longhua Temple (flourished during the Nanzhao to Dali kingdom periods) after its destruction by the Ming army.

— Jianxiong Ma

Azhali is considered a sect of Tantrism or esoteric Buddhism with hybrid traditions showing Chinese, Tibetan and Burmese influences. This tradition was also the major religion of the Dali Kingdom (937–1253). Acharya itself means guru or teacher in Sanskrit. According to Azhali practices among the Bai people, acharyas were allowed to marry and have children. The position of acharya was hereditary. The acharyas became state mentors in Nanzhao and held great influence until the Mongol conquest of China in the 13th century, during which the acharyas called upon various peoples to resist the Mongol rulers and later the Chinese during the Ming conquest of Yunnan. Zhu Yuanzhang banned the dissemination of Azhali Buddhism for a time before setting up an office to administer the religion.

The area had a strong connection with Tantric Buddhism, which has survived to this day at Jianchuan and neighboring areas. The worship of Guanyin and Mahākāla is very different from other forms of Chinese Buddhism. Nanzhao likely had strong religious connections with the Pagan Kingdom in what is today Myanmar, as well as Tibet and Bengal (see Pala Empire).

== Deities ==
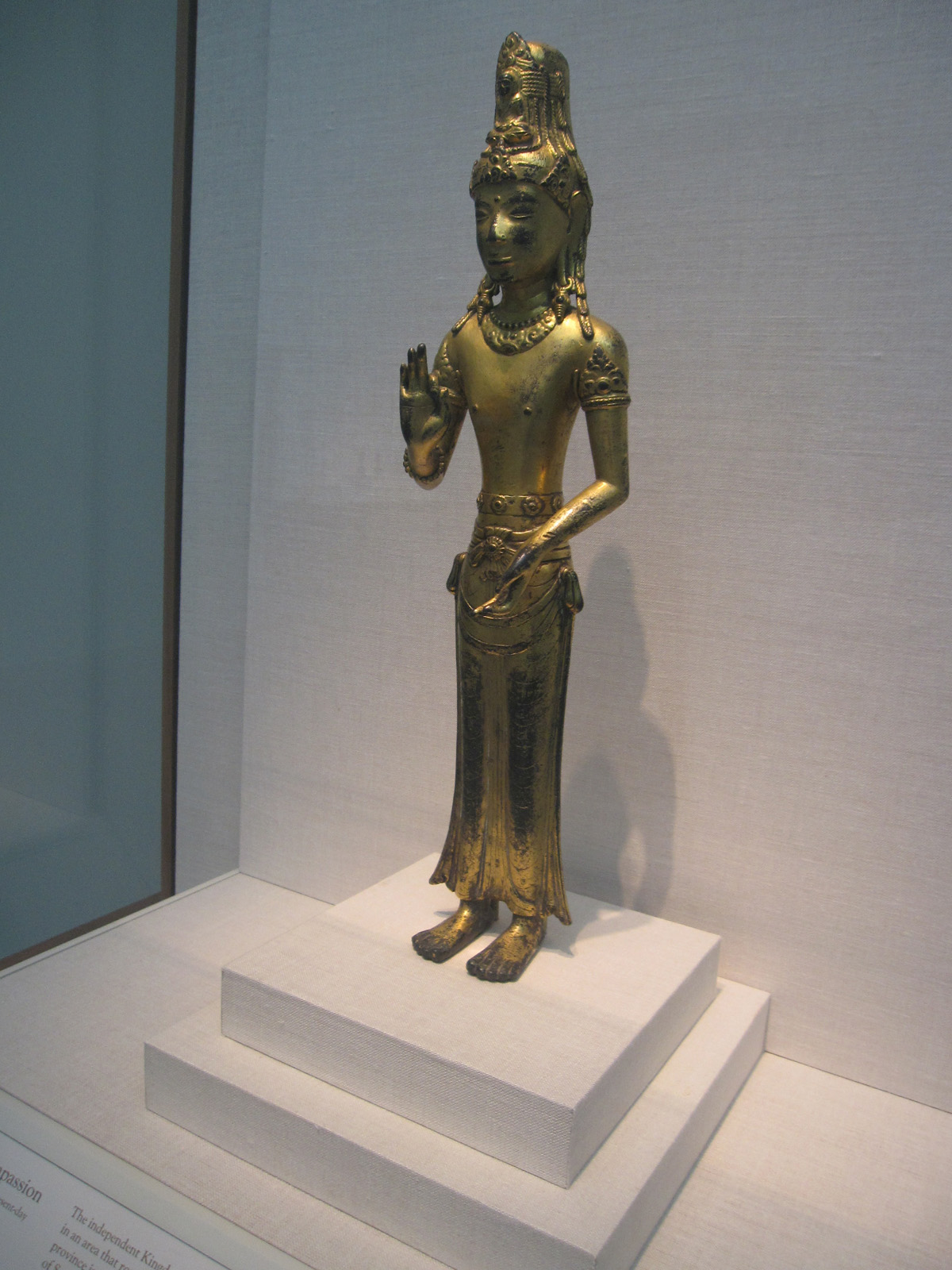
Avalokitesvara, Dali Kingdom

Key deities in this tradition include Mahakala (known locally as 'Black Sky god') and Acharya Lokeshvara. The Shibaoshan (Stone Treasure Mountain) grottoes, about 10 kilometres (6.2 mi) north of Shaxi, Yunnan, are examples of the art of this Vajrayana tradition.

== Modern era ==
The tradition faced several challenges during Yuan and Qing rule (such as being banned in 1507 and competition from Han Buddhist schools like Chan) but it continues as a living religion today.

== See also ==
- Bimoism
- Benzhuism
- Chinese Buddhism
- Chinese folk religion
- Chongsheng Temple (Yunnan)
- Vajrayana

== Bibliography ==
- Bryson, Megan (2013), Baijie and the Bai
- Bryson, Megan (2016), Goddess on the Frontier: Religion, Ethnicity, and Gender in Southwest China, Stanford University Press
- Huang, Zhengliang; Zhang, Xilu (2013). "Research Review of Bai Esoteric Buddhist Azhali Religion Since the 20th Century". Journal of Dali University.
- Huang, Caiwen (2020), The Lancang Guard and the Construction of Ming society in northwest Yunnan
- Wu, Jiang (2011). Enlightenment in Dispute: The Reinvention of Chan Buddhism in Seventeenth-Century China. USA: Oxford University Press. ISBN 0199895562.
