= Bai people =

Sino-Tibetan ethnic group of Southwest China

Bai (White)
白族
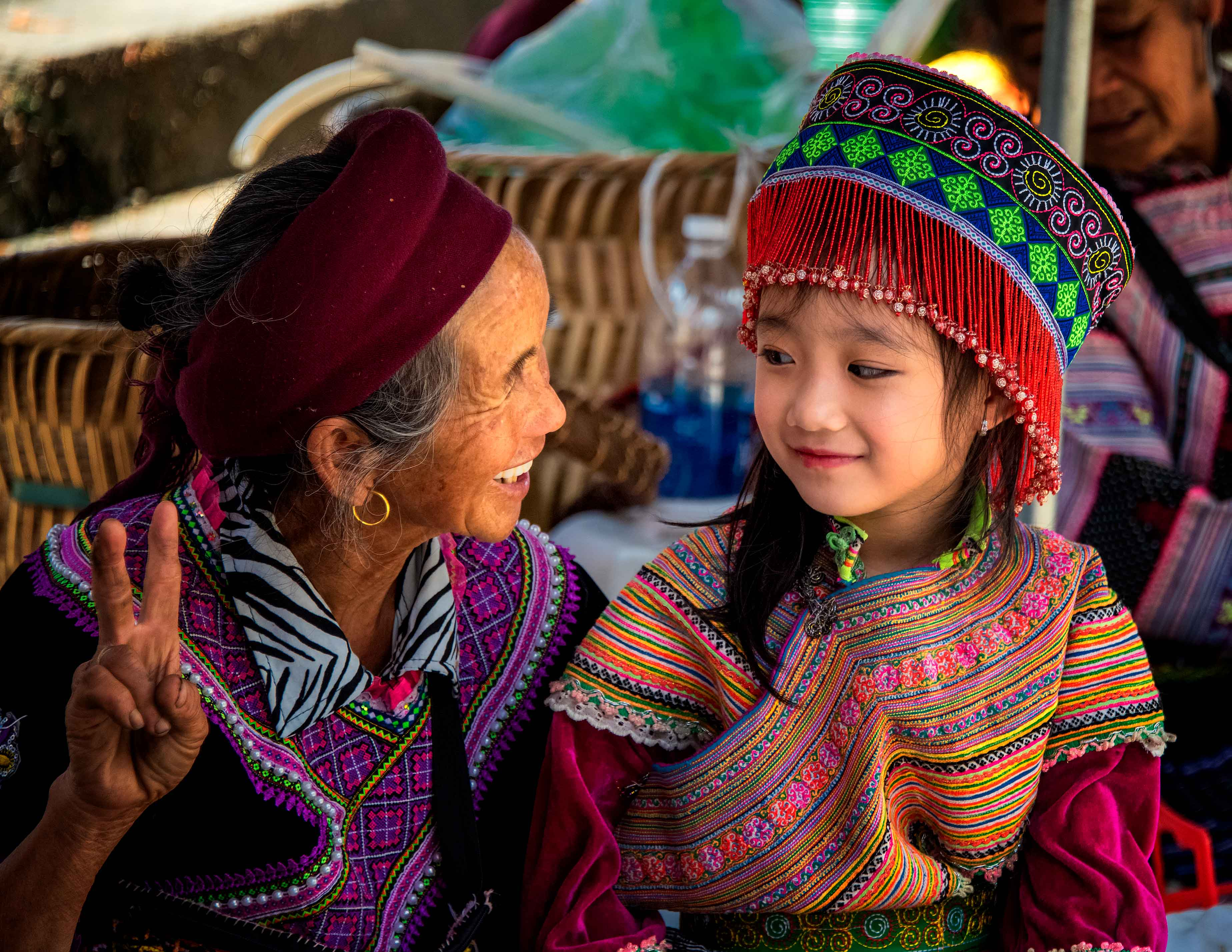
- An old woman and a girl of Bai ethnicity in Yunan Province

Total population
- 2,091,543 (as of 2020)

Languages
- Bai, Chinese (Southwestern and Standard)

Religion
- Buddhism, Benzhuism, Taoism, Christianity, Irreligion, Islam and other religions

Related ethnic groups
- Other Sinitic peoples; (Han Chinese, Hui, Taz, Dungan)

Bai people
- Chinese: 白族
Transcriptions
Standard Mandarin
- Hanyu Pinyin: Báizú
- Bopomofo: ㄅㄞˊ ㄗㄨˊ
- Wade–Giles: Pai²-tsu²
- Tongyong Pinyin: Bái-zú
- IPA: [pǎɪ.tsǔ]
Wu
- Romanization: bah zoh
Hakka
- Romanization: Pha̍k-tshu̍k
Southern Min
- Hokkien POJ: Pe̍h-cho̍k
- Teochew Peng'im: Pêh-tsôk
Eastern Min
- Fuzhou BUC: Bah-cŭk

The Bai or Pai (Bai: Baipho [pɛ̰˦˨xo̰˦], 白和; Chinese: 白族; pinyin: Báizú) are an East Asian ethnic group native to the Dali Bai Autonomous Prefecture of Yunnan Province, Bijie area of Guizhou Province, and Sangzhi area of Hunan Province. The Bai constitute one of the 56 ethnic groups officially recognized by China, with a population of 2,091,543 (as of 2020).

== Names ==
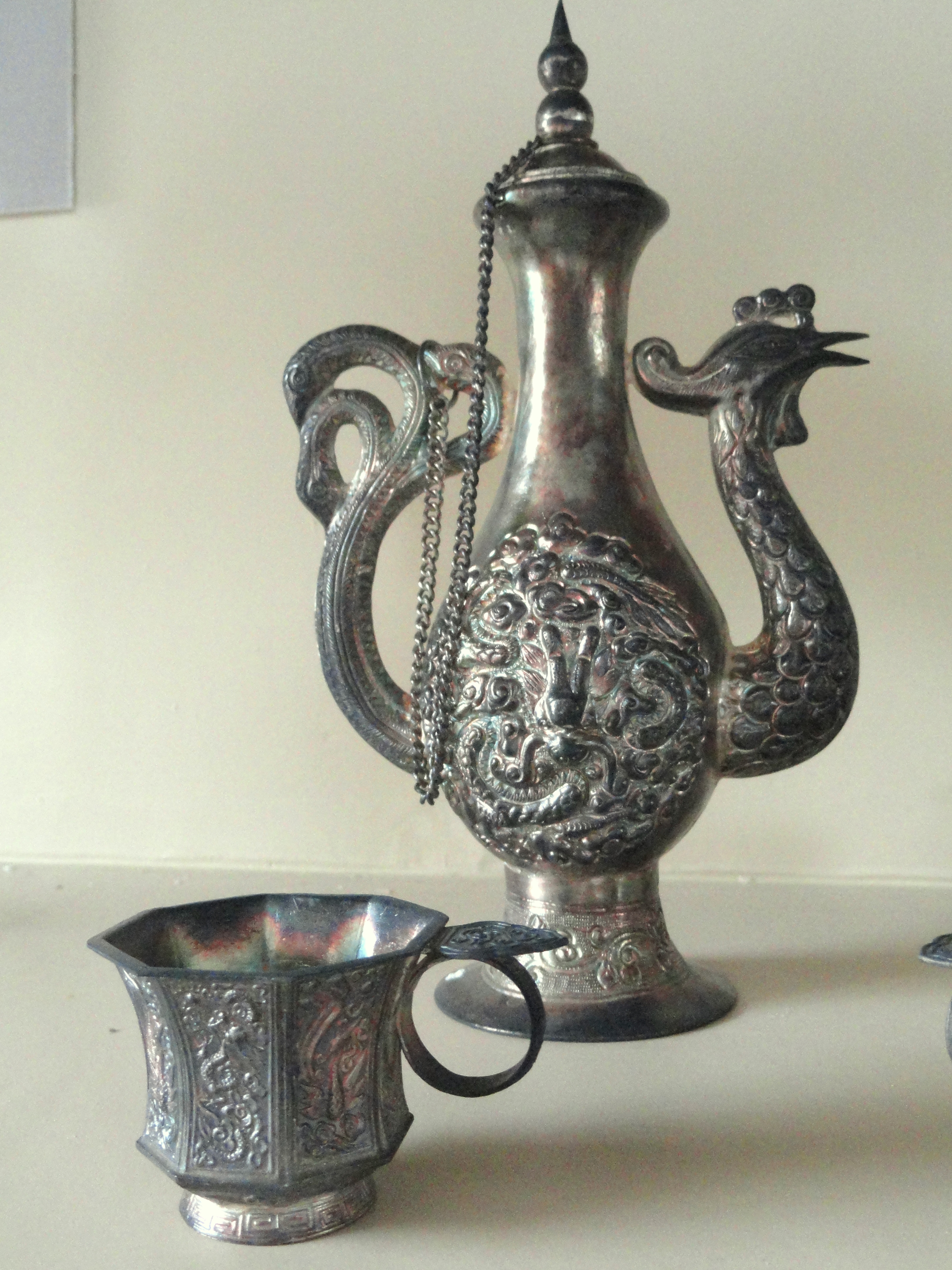
Bai silver liquor set

The Bai people hold the colour white in high esteem and call themselves "Baipzix" (pɛ˦˨ tsi˧, Baizi, 白子), "Bai'ho" (pɛ˦˨ xo˦, Baihuo, 白伙), "Bai yinl" (pɛ˦˨ ji˨˩, Baini, 白尼), or "Miep jiax", literally meaning "white people". Bai (白) means "white" in Chinese. Because of their strong preference for white, in 1956 the Chinese authorities named this ethnic group the Bai nationality.

The Bai were previously named the Minjia (民家) by the Chinese from the 14th century to 1949.

=== Modern identity ===
The Bai people are one of the most sinicized minorities in China. The Bai ruling family of the Dali Kingdom claimed to have Chinese ancestry and was recorded by the Yuan dynasty to have hailed from Wuwei, Gansu. Although the Bai are technically one of China's 56 official ethnic groups, it is difficult to qualify them as a distinct ethnic minority. As early as the 1940s, some rejected their non-Chinese origin and preferred to identify themselves solely as Chinese. The Bai ethnic label was not widely used or known until 1958. Today, the Bai people accept minority status for pragmatic reasons; however, they are culturally nearly indistinguishable from Han Chinese.

One prerequisite for creating a hybrid form of Chinese would be a unique cultural identity, distinct from the Han, but the Bai people have been said by the sinologist Charles Patrick Fitzgerald to have held no ‘strong national feeling’ even before 1949. Hence, Fitzgerald, author of an authoritative study on Bai (whom he called by their former Chinese name, the Min-kia [minjia 民家]), said that many travelers regarded them as an absorbed people hardly to be distinguished from Han Chinese.

— Duncan Poupard

== Location ==
The Bai predominantly reside in Dali Bai Autonomous Prefecture, Yunnan Province, as well as in Gucheng District and Yulong County of Lijiang City, Nanhua County of Chuxiong Prefecture, Xishan District, Wuhua District, and Anning City (Taiping Town) of Kunming City, Lushui County of Nujiang Lisu Autonomous Prefecture, Longyang District of Baoshan City, Fengqing County of Lincang City, and portions of Zhenxiong County of Zhaotong City.

The Bai also constitute a hereditary ethnic group in Guizhou, Hunan, and Hubei Provinces, specifically in Bijie City, Liuzhi Special District, and Shucheng County within Liupanshui City in Guizhou; Sangzhi County in Zhangjiajie City in Hunan; and Hefeng County in Enshi Prefecture in Hubei.

== History ==
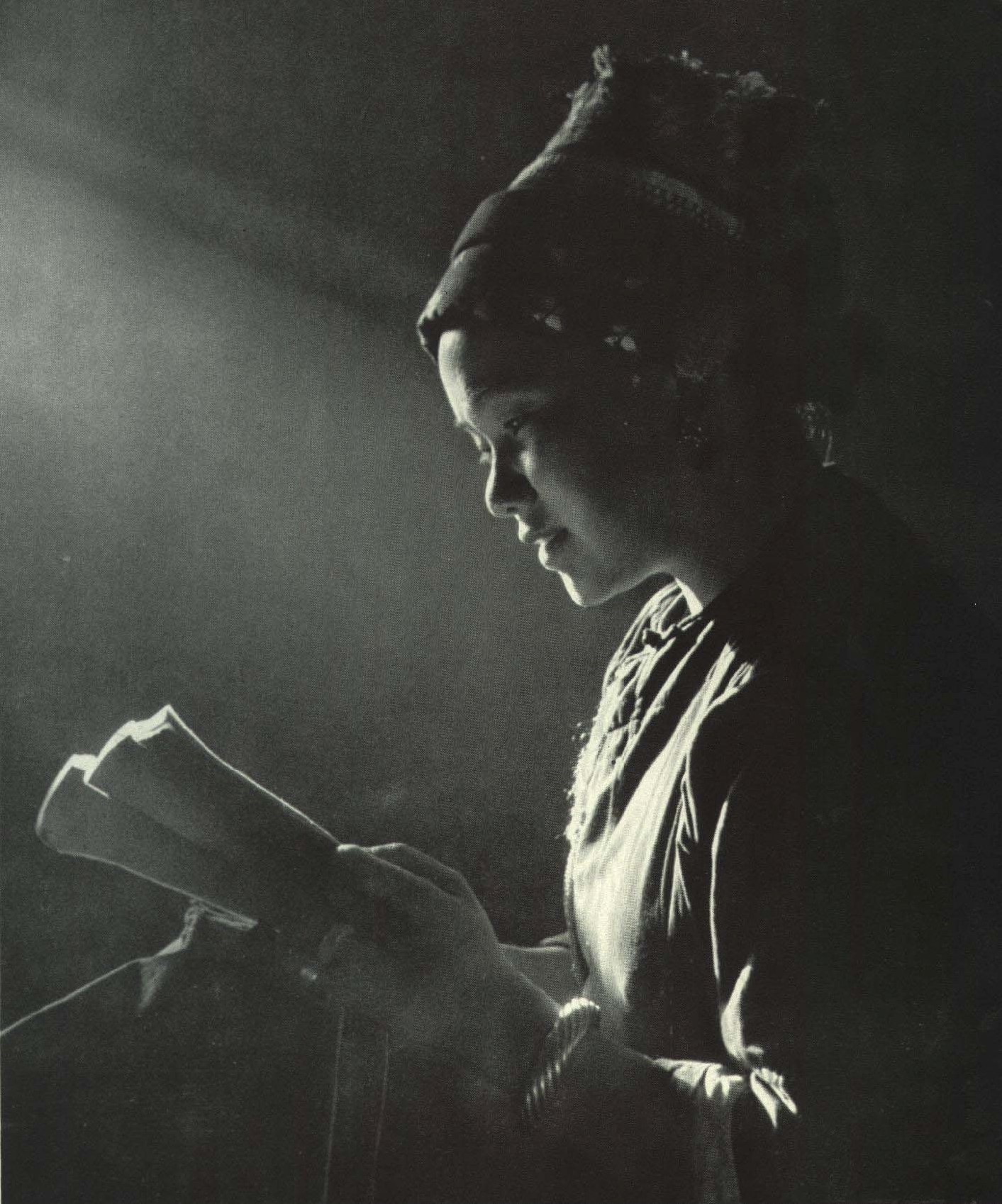
A Bai girl reading (1963)

The origin of the Bai people has been heavily debated over the past century, though those debates mainly focus on the groups of people who were assimilated. According to archaeological excavations around Lake Erhai, the Bai people may have originated in the area around the lake. The earliest human site, discovered in the early 20th century, was called the Paleolithic Malong relics of Mt. Cangshan (苍山马龙遗址), dated circa 4000 BP. The late sites include Haimenkou of Jianchuan (剑川海门口, 3000 BP), Baiyangcun of Binchuan (宾川白羊村, 3500 BP), and Dabona of Xiangyun (祥云大波那, 2350 BP).

The Bai are mentioned in Tang dynasty texts as the 'Bo (or Bai) People'. Assuming the Bo transcription is correct, the earliest mention of the Bai was in the third century BCE in a text called Lüshi Chunqiu (Spring and Autumn Annals of Master Lü Buwei). They were mentioned again in Sima Qian's Records of the Grand Historian in the first century BCE.

The Bai were one of the tribes that helped establish Nanzhao (649–902). In 937, the Dali Kingdom was founded by Duan Siping, a Bai man whose family had played a major role in the Nanzhao Kingdom, advocated for the "relief of corvée" (Chinese: 宽徭役) and joined 37 tribes in eastern Yunnan to instigate a rebellion. The Dali Kingdom persisted for about 300 years (937–1253), facilitating the Bai's establishment of internal cohesion centered around the Erhai Lake.

In 1253, the Mongols led by Kublai Khan conquered the Dali Kingdom. The Yuan dynasty established Yunnan Province, created administrative districts in the Erhai region, and retained the Duan Family, the former rulers of Dali, to oversee the region.

In 1381, the Ming dynasty army defeated the Yuan forces, deposed the former ruler of Dali, instituted Dali Prefecture, and subsequently Han Chinese soldiers and migrants entered the Dali region to cultivate the land.

== Language ==
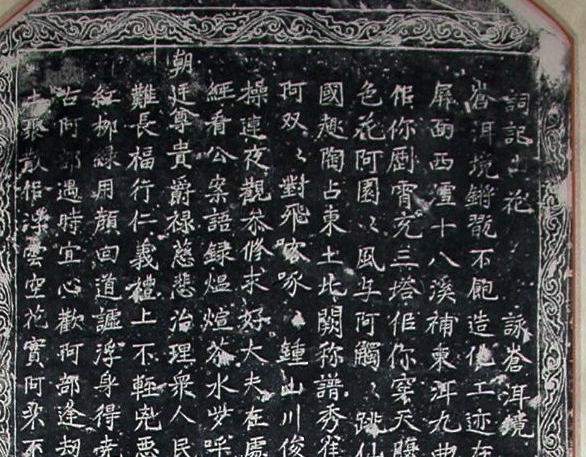
A poem written in Square Bai script on the Shanhua tablet (山花碑)

As of 2004, only Bai people who lived in the mountains spoke Bai as their only language, but some Han Chinese in Dali also spoke Bai due to local influence. Among modern Bai people, Chinese is usually used for popular media such as radio, television, and news, while Bai is relegated to folk-arts related activities. No book in the Bai language has been published as of 2005.

The origins of the language have been obscured by many years of intensive Chinese influence. Several theories have been proposed, including categorizing it as a sister language of Chinese, a separate group within the Sino-Tibetan family, or in a category more related to the Austroasiatic languages or Hmong language. Superficially, the Bai lexicon and grammar are closer to Chinese languages, but they also share common vocabulary items with the Lolo-Burmese languages.

According to the Manshu (Book of Barbarians) by Fan Chuo (9th century), the Baiman's pronunciation of Chinese was the most accurate out of all the tribes in the area. Scriptures from Nanzhao unearthed in 1950s show that they were written in the Bai language (similar to Chữ Nôm and the Old Zhuang script) but it does not seem Nanzhao ever attempted to standardize or popularize the script. The same was true for its successor, the Dali Kingdom. During the Ming dynasty, the government began offering state examinations in Yunnan, which solidified Classical Chinese as the official language.

== Religion ==
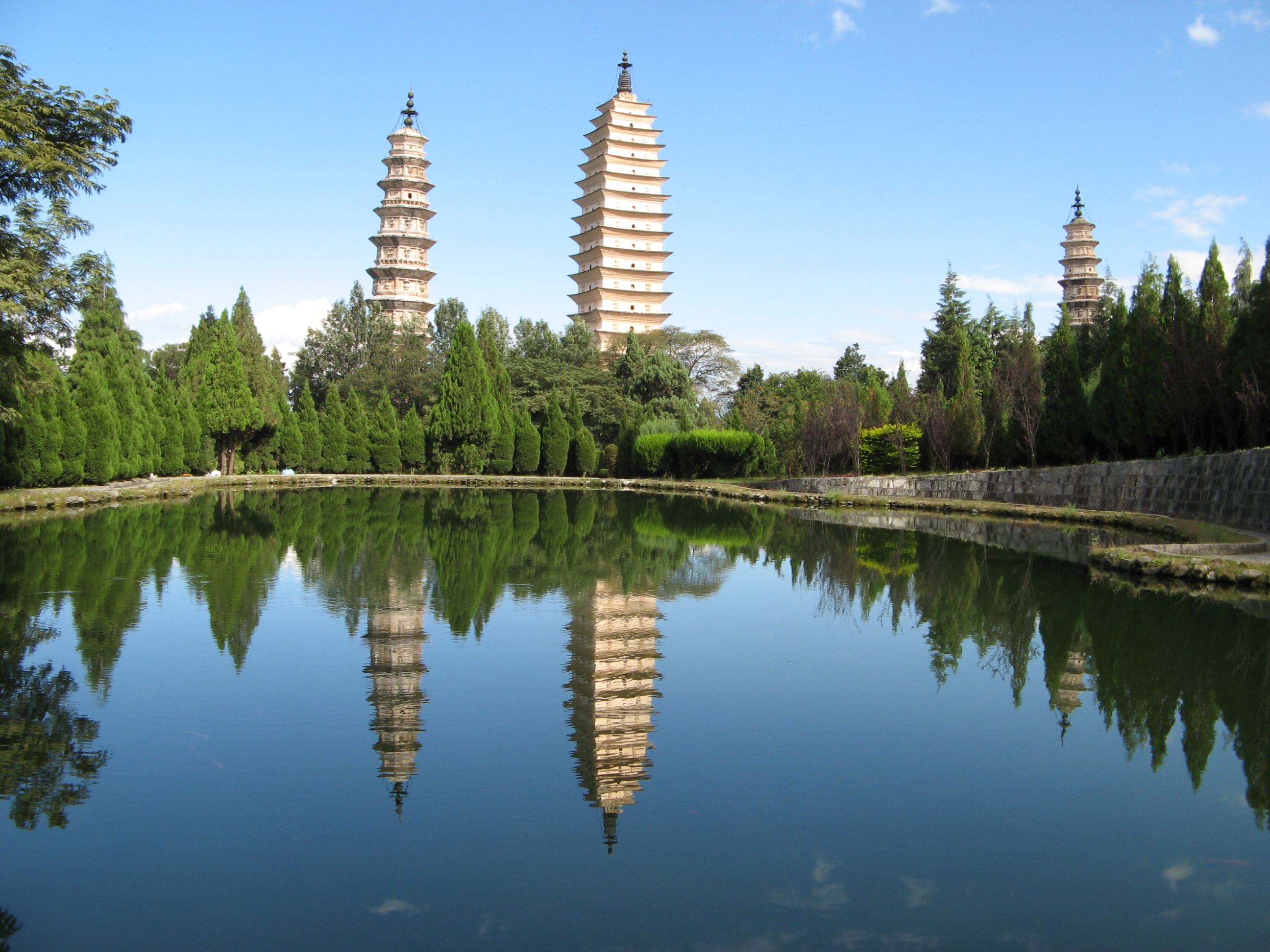
Reflection Pond mirroring the image of the Three Pagodas.

The habits of the Bai people in the Dali region closely resemble those of conventional Han Chinese culture. They are profoundly impacted by Buddhism, Taoism, and Confucianism.

=== Buddhism ===
Most Bai people adhere to a form of Buddhism known as Azhaliism.

Historically, the Dali Kingdom was the first Buddhist nation in Yunnan, excluding the Tibetan people in northwestern Yunnan. Buddhism was brought to the Bai people as early as the 8th century. The Bai people once practiced Mahayana Tantric Buddhism. After Wu Sangui's Three Clans Rebellion, it was decisively quelled by the Qing Dynasty. Subsequently, the Buddhist beliefs of the Bai people were coercively supplanted by Chinese Hinayana Buddhism. Furthermore, the Bai people exhibit a strong interest in transcribing Buddhist scriptures. Notable locations such as the Thousand Search Pagoda at Chongsheng Temple, Fengyi North Tangtian Fazang Temple, the Three Pagodas of Chongsheng Temple, and the Fotu Temple have yielded various Buddhist texts, including the Diamond Sutra, Lotus Sutra, and Large Prajñāpāramitā Sūtras, among others.

=== Benzhuism ===
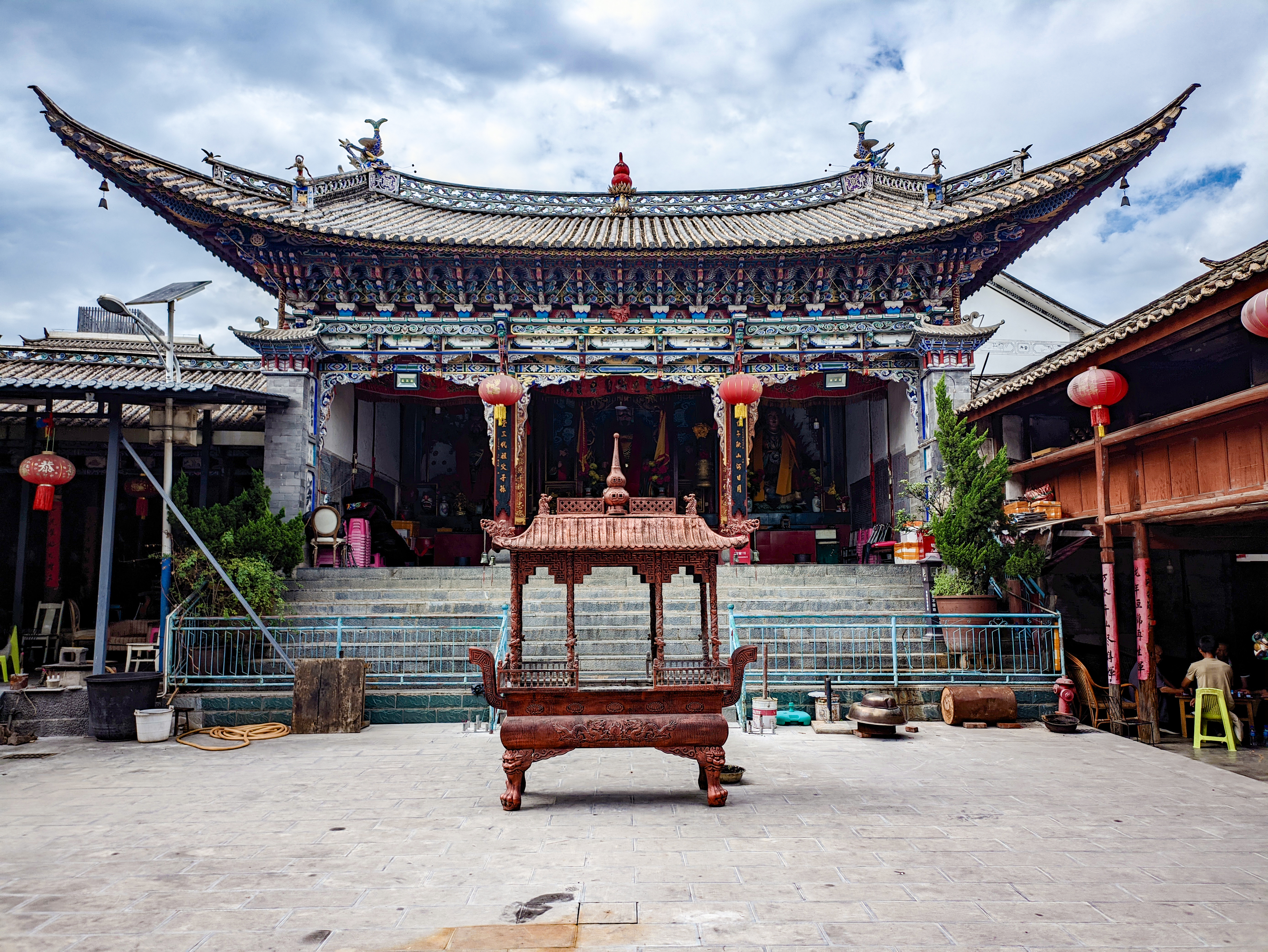
Dajianpang Benzhu Temple in Dali

Although most Bai people adhere to Azhaliism, a form of Buddhism that traces its history back to the Nanzhao Kingdom, they also practice a native religion called Benzhuism: the worship of ngel zex (本主; běnzhǔ), local gods and ancestors. Ngel zex could be any hero in history—the prince of the Nanzhao regime, a hero of folklore or even a tiger (for instance, Laojun Jingdi Chinese: 老君景帝 is a tiger).

=== Christianity ===
George Clarke, who arrived in 1881, was the first Protestant missionary to the Bai population. Few Bai individuals adhere to the Christian faith; yet, Christian churches exist in Dali.

=== Islam ===
There are a few villages in Yunnan where residents are Muslims, but speak Bai as their first language. These people are officially classified by Chinese authorities as belonging to the Hui nationality and call themselves Bai Hui ("Bai-speaking Muslims"). They usually say that their ancestors were Hui people, who came to Yunnan as followers of the Mongolian army in the 14th century.

== Culture ==
=== Gender ===
Gender roles were relatively equal in Bai society and women were not considered inferior to men. Having only daughters and no sons was not considered a tragedy.

=== Agriculture ===
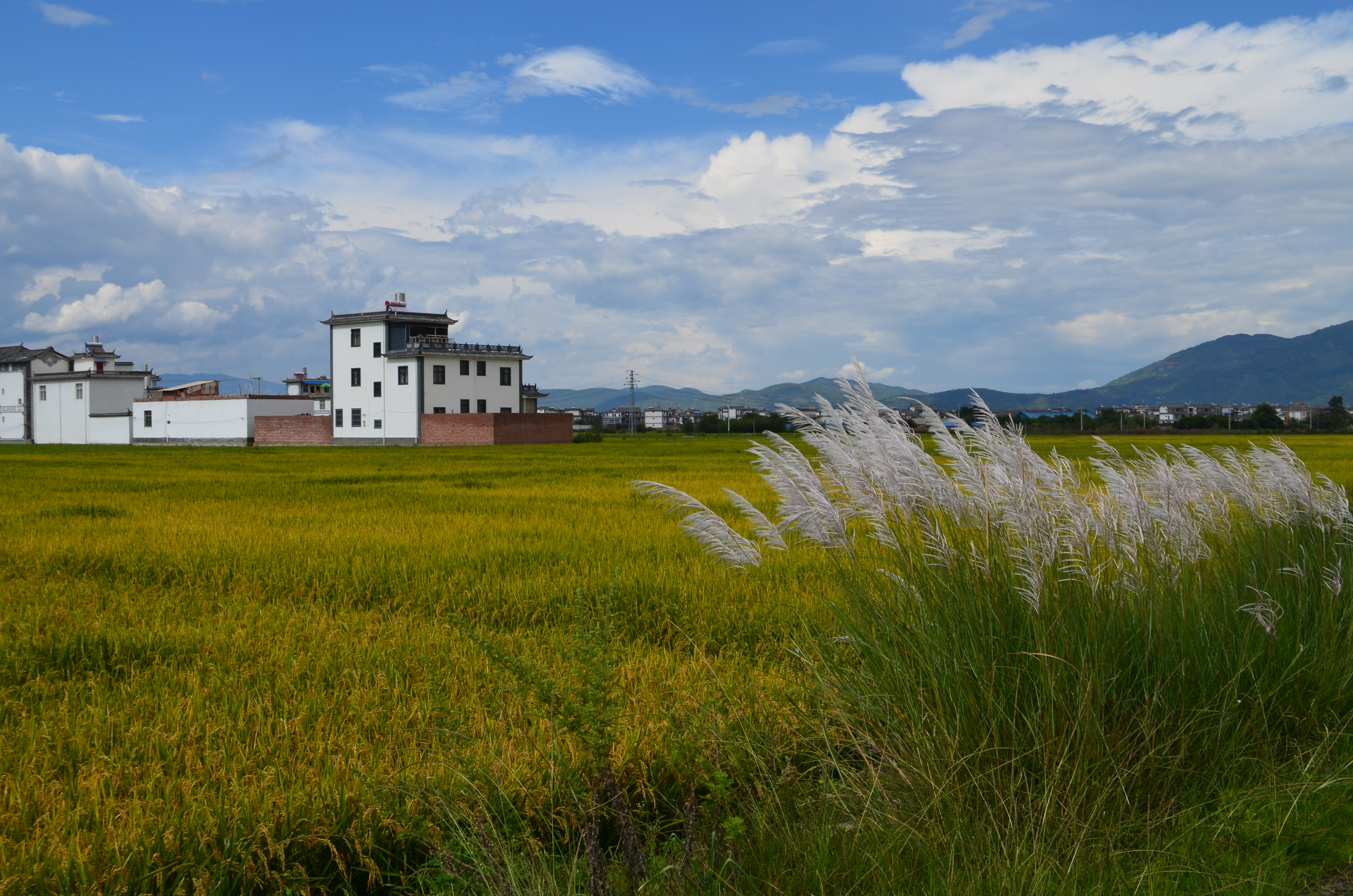
Rice field in Xizhou, Dali

Most Bai are agriculturalists. They cultivate many crops like rice, wheat, rapeseed, sugar, millet, cotton, cane, corn, and tobacco. However, some Bai also engage in fishing and selling local handicrafts to tourists. Most Bai were subsistence rice farmers, but they also cultivated wheat, vegetables, and fruits. Unlike the Han and most other Chinese minority groups, the Bai ate cheese and made it from either cow or goat milk. The leftover whey from the process of cheese-making was fed to pigs. Those who lived around Erhai Lake fished.

Bai fishermen have trained cormorants to fish since the 9th century. Lower water quality and high costs of cormorant training have resulted in recent disuse of the practice, though cormorant fishing is still done by local fishers today for tourists.

=== Cuisine ===
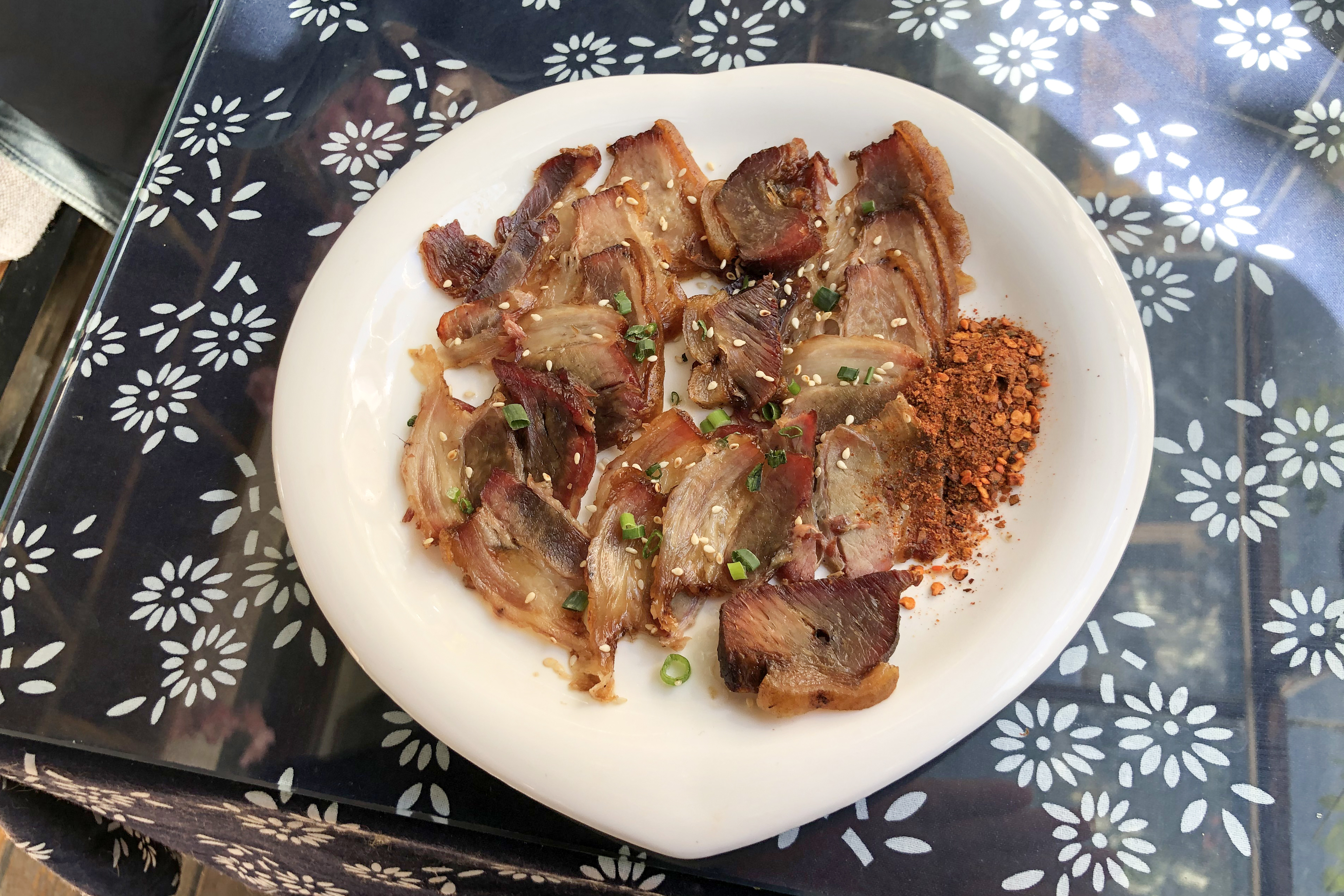
Bai ethnic style roasted pork "raw meat"

The Bai people enjoy sour, cold and spicy flavours and excel in preparing delicacies such as cured gammon, bowfish (Zacco taliensis), river snails sauce, fried termite mushrooms (Termitomyces) and pork liver. The Bai people of Dali and surrounding regions enjoy a distinctive dish known as "raw meat" or "raw skin," which consists of pork that is roasted to a medium doneness, then sliced or shredded, and served with ginger, green onions, vinegar, and chilli peppers to entertain guests.

Additionally, there are white wines produced from glutinous rice, "snow plums" crafted from stewed plums and sugar from Cang Mountain, as well as Dengchuan's distinctive "milk fan" and "milk cake".

=== Bai tie-dye ===
Tie-dyeing process made by Bai people in Dali

Bai tie-dye (Chinese: 白族扎染) is extensively utilised in Bai apparel, everyday items, traditional folklore, religious ceremonies, and national celebrations. The primary stages of tie-dyeing consist of flower tying and dyeing, with the essential techniques being the twisting and tying approach along with the dyeing process. The essence of the technique is in the dying method and the proficiency in dyeing. The primary instruments for tie-dyeing include the dyeing jar, dyeing stick, sun rack, and stone mill.

Zhoucheng, Dali (Chinese: 大理周城) offers a diverse array of tie-dye items, featuring over 1,000 distinct patterns characterised by a broad spectrum of themes and profound meanings.

=== Clothing ===
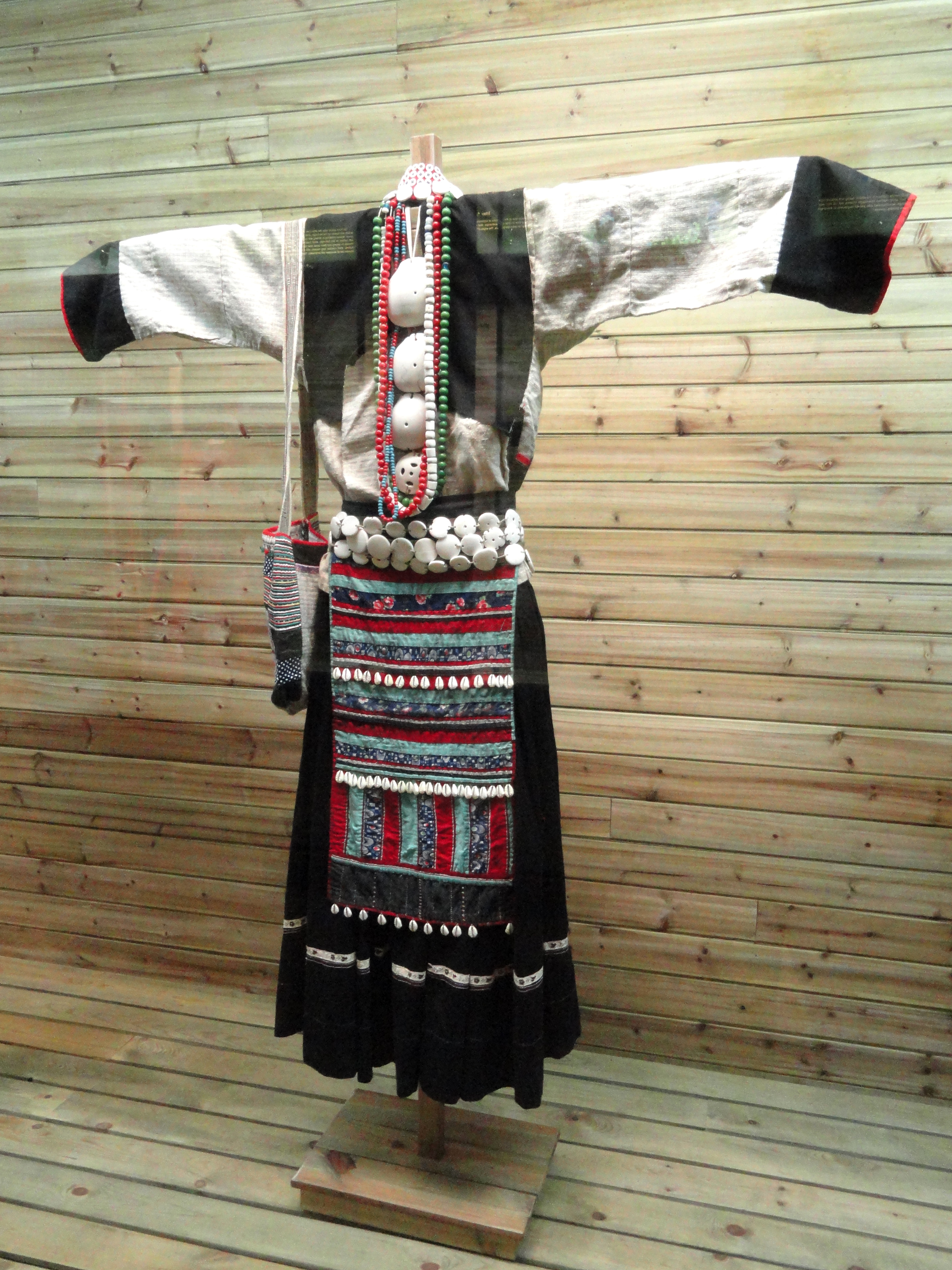
Bai woman's clothing

The Bai people, as their name would suggest, favor white clothes and decorations. Women generally wear white dresses, sleeveless jackets of red, blue, or black, embroidered belts, loose trousers, embroidered shoes of white cloth, and jewelry made of gold or silver. Women in Dali traditionally wear a white coat trimmed with a black or purple collar, loose blue trousers, embroidered shoes, silver bracelets, and earrings. Unmarried women wear a single pigtail on the top of their head, while married women roll their hair. The men wear white jackets, black-collared coats, and dark loose shorts. Their headwear and costume reflect the Bai symbols: the snow, the moon, the flower, and the wind.

Many Bai women style their hair in a long braid wrapped in a headcloth. This style is called "the phoenix bows its head".

=== Arts ===
The Bai have a traditional form of theater called Chuichuiqiang. However, this local tradition is endangered, as is traditional Bai culture in general.

== Festivals ==
=== Raosanlin and Horse-racing ===
The three major Bai festivals are called the Raosanlin (Walking Around Three Souls). The most important one is the Third Month Fair, held annually at the foot of Mount Cang in Dali between the fifteenth and twentieth days of the third lunar month. Originally, it was a religious activity to rally and pay homage, but it gradually evolved into a fair that included performances of traditional sports and dance as well as the trade of merchandise from different regions. The second festival is the Shibaoshan Song Festival, and the third is the Torch Festival, held on the 25th day of the sixth lunar month to wish health and a good harvest. On that evening, the countryside is decorated with banners with auspicious words written upon them. Villagers then light torches in front of their gates and walk around the fields while holding yet more torches in order to catch pests.

Traditional horse race held at the Third Month Fair

Horse racing is a customary practice of the Bai people, conducted not only during the Third Month Fair but also at the Mule-and-Horse Meeting in Jianchuan in July, the Fish Pone Meeting in Eryuan and Dengchuan in August, and in several villages. The origins of Bai horse racing date back over a millennium to the Tang Dynasty, coinciding with the introduction of Buddhism to Nanzhao. The Guanyin Temple Fair, conducted at the base of Cang Mountain in March of the lunar calendar, has progressively transformed into the Third Month Fair and associated commercial activities. Initially, the market primarily focused on the exchange of medical herbs and cattle. To further their business, horse sellers arranged horse-riding competitions at the market to showcase the strength and speed of the horses. Horse racing has consequently become a significant aspect of Third Month Fair. Annually, during the festival, the Bai and other ethnic groups, like the Tibetans and Nakhi, convene from across the globe in ceremonial clothing with their horses to engage in horse-racing.

=== Tea ceremony ===
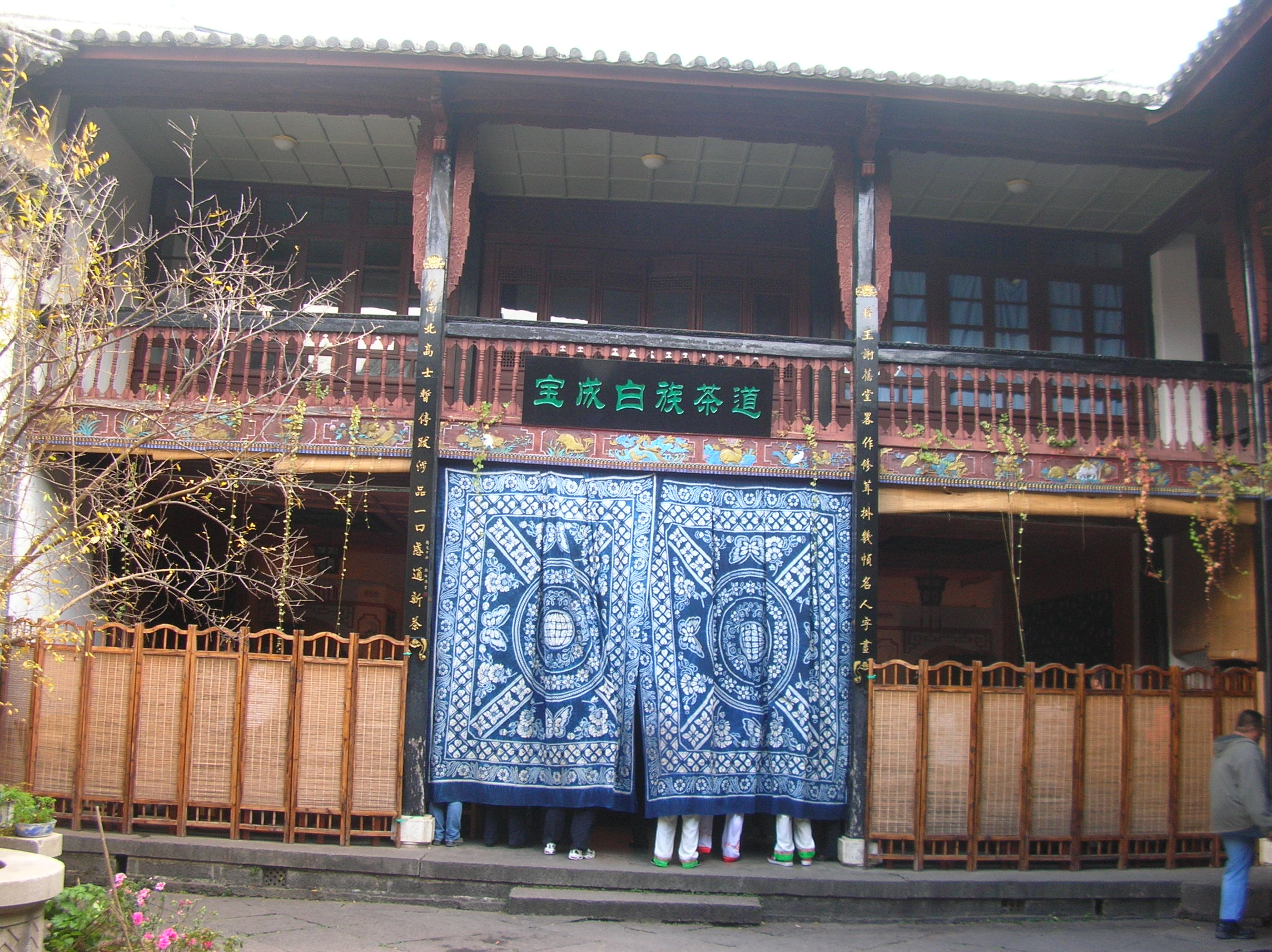
A Bai tea serving ceremonial ground in Dali

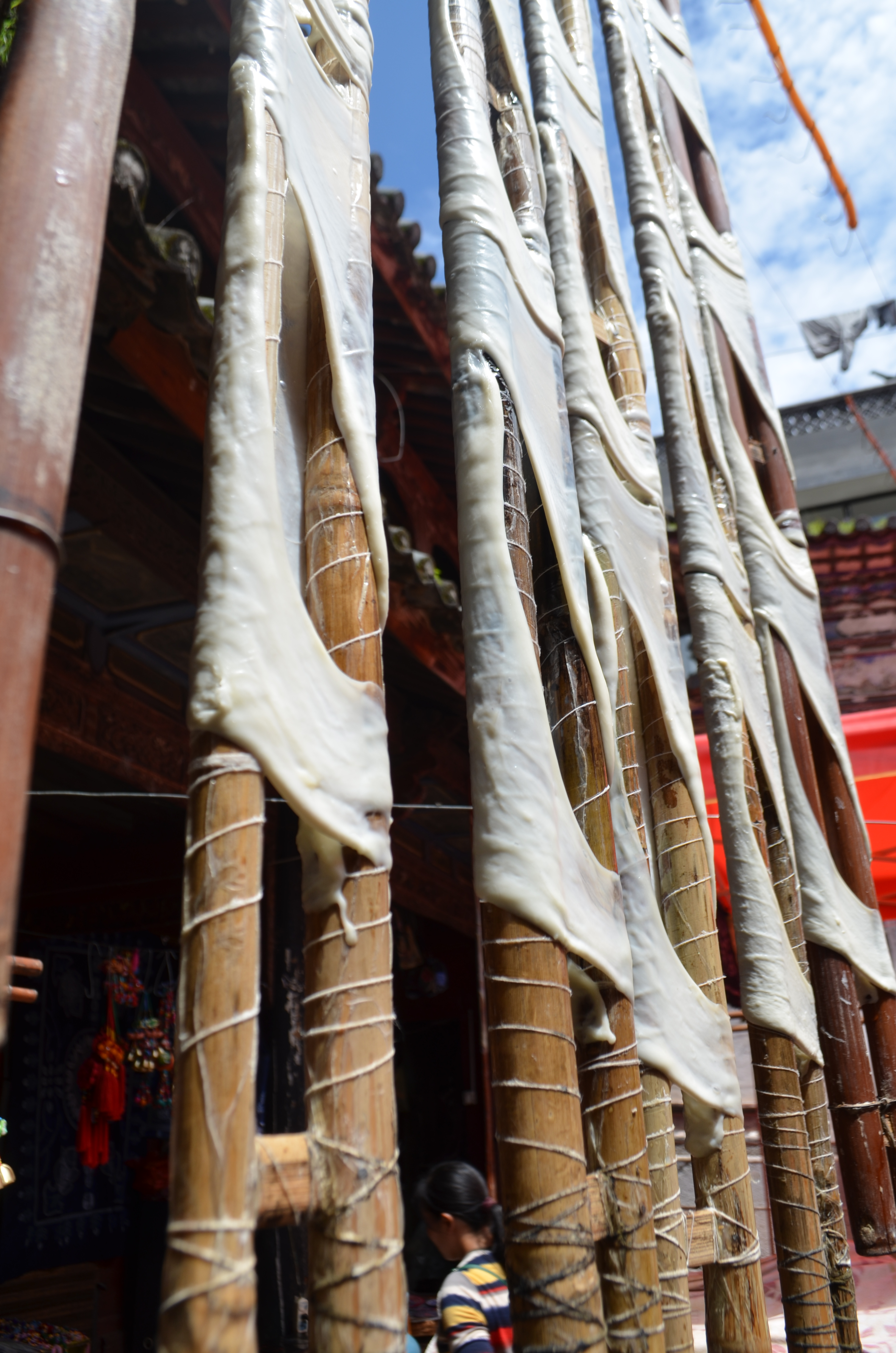
Rushan cheese is a traditional cheese for Bai people

The Bai tea ceremony, San Dao Cha 三道茶 (Three Course Tea), is most popular among the Bai in the Dali area and is a common sight at festivals and marriages. It is both a cultural ceremony and a method of honouring a guest. The ceremony is often described in Mandarin as 'Yiku, Ertian, sanhuiwei' 一苦二甜三回味 (First is bitter, Second is sweet, Third brings reflection (aftertaste)).

The first tea course starts with baking the tea leaves in a clay pot over a small flame, shaking the leaves often while they bake. When they turn slightly brown and give off a distinct fragrance, heated water is added to the pot. The water should immediately begin bubbling. When the bubbling ceases, a small amount of bitterly fragrant, concentrated tea remains. Due to the sound the hot water makes when it enters the clay pot, the first course tea was, in previous times, also known as Lei Xiang Cha 雷响茶 (Sound of Thunder Tea).

The second course is sweet tea. Pieces of walnut kernel and roasted rushan (乳扇, lit. milk fan), a dried cheese specific to the Dali region, are put into a tea cup with brown sugar and other ingredients. Boiling water is added and the tea is then offered to the guest. This tea is sweet without being oily, so the guest can easily drink it.

The third tea is made by mixing honey, Sichuan pepper, slices of ginger, and cassia together in a china cup with hot Cangshan Xue green tea. The product is a tea that is sweet, coarse and spicy all at once. This Dali specialty has a noticeable aftertaste, which meant it was known as Hui Wei Cha 回味茶 (Reflection Tea).

The 18 procedures of the tea ceremony are governed by strict etiquette, which follows the principles of etiquette, honesty, and beauty. As such, the tea ceremony is considered by some to perfectly embody the hospitable Bai people's current customs.

== Architecture ==
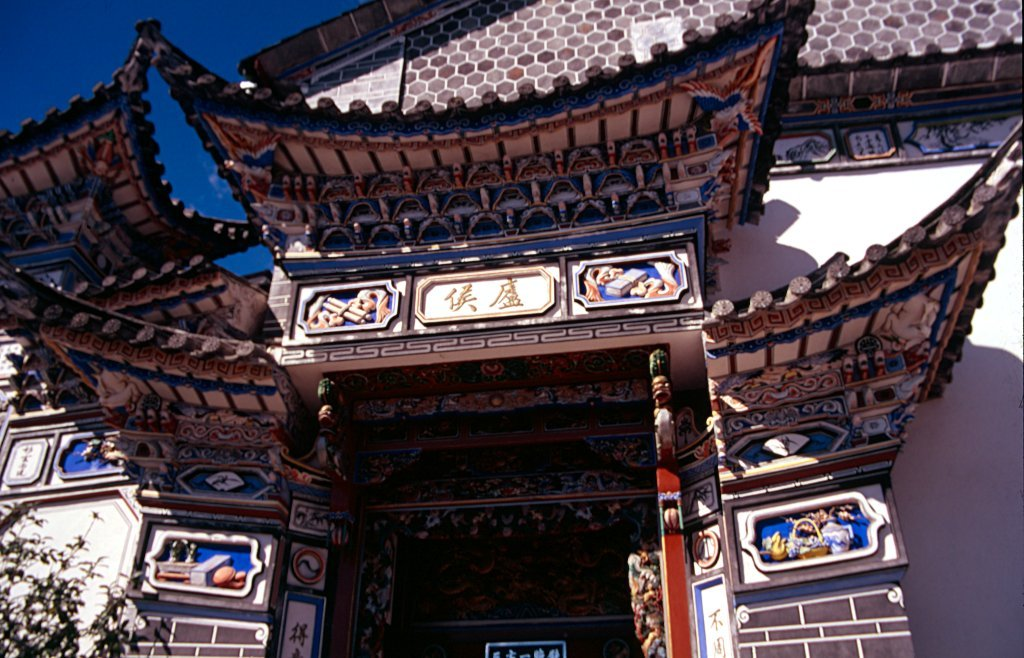
Typical Bai architecture in Erhai Lake, Yunnan

The Bai people are recognized for their architecture, which is stylistically unique to their culture. Bai architecture has been largely inspired by religious beliefs, which include ancestral and nature worship. Buildings are reflective of this worship, often featuring complex carvings and tile designs of animals and flowers. Totems of animals such as tigers, dragons, and chickens were added in order to ward of evil spirits or natural disasters.

Homes were designed based on feng shui concepts that dictated the lay out, structure, and placement of halls and doors. The Bai people believed practices such as placing the back side of buildings towards the mountains with entrances facing water and placing doors so that they faced north-east would store wind and gather qi. This layout also allowed for plenty of sunlight and blocked much of the wind that came from the south-west.

Bai architecture was influenced throughout history by their interactions with other ethnic groups. During the Nanzhao period, the Bai people incorporated courtyards and terraces from the Han culture, adapting it to their customs. They developed standards such as “four houses with five patios”, "three houses and a shade wall", or "three workshops and a shining wall", with decorative plants in the court yard. The roofs of the buildings featured curved surfaces, upward curving ends, and "flying eaves". This design created shade and diverted rain water away from the main wooden structure of the buildings.

== Notable Bai people ==
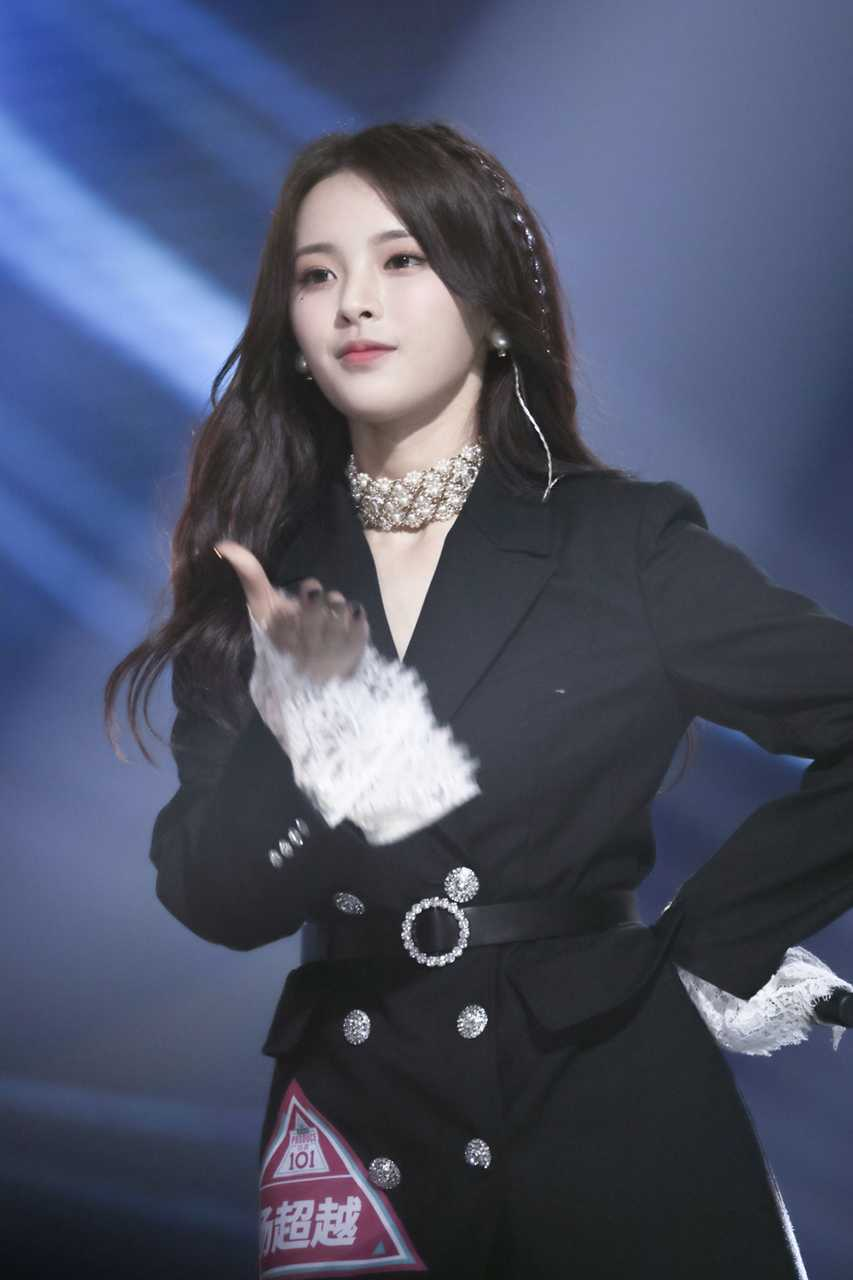
Yang Chaoyue is a Chinese actress and singer of Bai ethnicity

- Duan Siping (段思平) – founder of the Dali Kingdom
- Shen Yiqin (谌贻琴) – President of the All-China Women's Federation and a state counsellor of China
- Wang Xiji (王希季) – aerospace engineer, designer of the Long March 1 rocket
- Xu Lin (徐琳) is a linguist and one of the two founders of modern grammar of Bai language
- Yang Chaoyue (杨超越) – actress, pop music singer, former member of Rocket Girls 101
- Yang Liping (杨丽萍) – dancer
- Yang Rong (楊蓉) – actress
- Yang Yuntao (楊雲濤) – dancer
- Zhang Le Jin Qiu (张乐进求) – legendary ancestor of the Bai
- Zhang Lizhu (张丽珠) – gynecologist
- Zhang Jiebao (张结宝) was a famous bandit leader, active in the 1920s in northwestern Yunnan
- Zhao Fan (趙藩) – scholar, calligrapher, and poet
- Zhao Shiming (赵式铭) – scholar, the first one who studied the Bai language the most systematically
- Zhao Yansun (赵衍荪) – linguist, one of two founders of modern grammar of Bai language
- Zhou Baozhong (周保中) – military general, who led the battles against the Japanese invasion in northeastern China
- Fiona Ma (馬世雲) – American politician
- Dianxi Xiaoge (滇西小哥) – KOL (key opinion leader), content creator, YouTuber

== See also ==
- Benzhuism
- Nanzhao
- Dali Kingdom
