= Bimo (disambiguation) =

Bimo may refer to:

- Bimbo, Central African Republic
- Bimo, a shaman of the Yi people

== See also ==
- BIMOS, Busan Motor Show
- BiMOS, MOS-based BJT
