= Xu Lin =

Xu Lin may refer to:

- Xu Lin (Hanban) (许琳), director of Hanban
- Xu Lin (born 1963) (徐麟), head of the Cyberspace Administration of China and Communist Party Secretary of Guizhou
- Xu Lin (linguist) (徐琳), a Chinese minority linguist.

== See also ==
- Lin Xu (林旭), Qing dynasty reformer
