= Benzhuism =

Indigenous religion of the Bai people

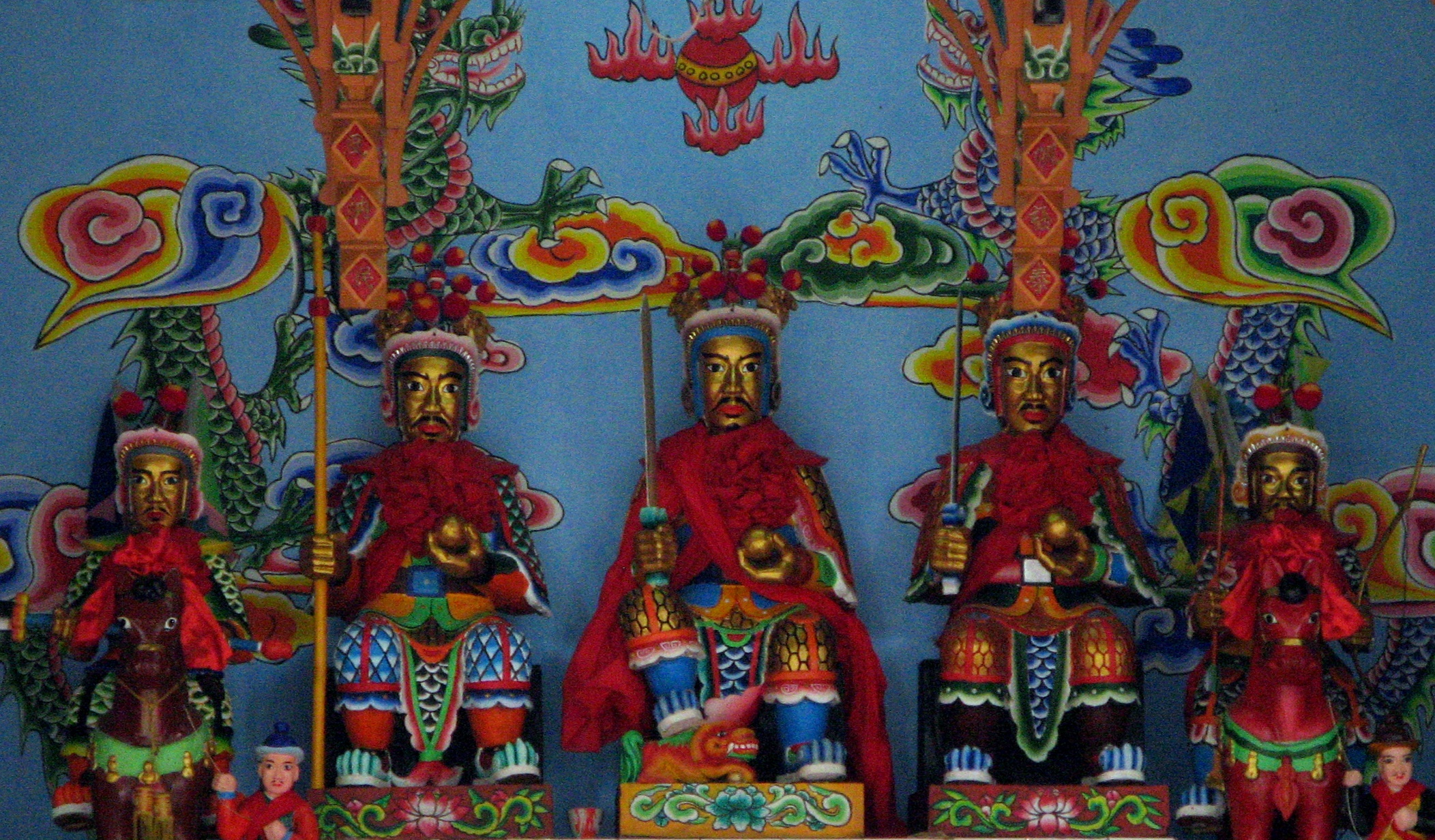
The Sanxing (Three Star Gods) at a Benzhu temple on Jinsuo Island, in Dali, Yunnan.

Benzhuism (Chinese: 本主教; pinyin: Běnzhǔjiào; lit. 'religion of the patrons') is the indigenous religion of the Bai people, an ethnic group of Yunnan, China. It consists of the worship of the ngel zex, the Bai word for "patrons" or "lords", rendered as benzhu (本主) in Chinese, that are local gods and deified ancestors of the Bai people. It is very similar to common Chinese religion.

While many of the Bai are Buddhists, the local government of China has recently helped the revival of the Benzhu ethnic religion, for example through the promotion of the Gwer Sa La festival.

== The patrons ==
=== Local lords and ancestors ===
The benzhu are mainly deified ancestors, "patrons" or "lords" of the local communities. Every Bai village has its own pantheon of gods which has formed throughout its existence, incorporating its history in deifying virtuous leaders, warriors, and heroes. These deities, who are tied to the immediate surroundings, protect the people against sickness and violence, foster local economy, and grant prosperity.

Generally, one village enshrines one benzhu, and there are also cases of multiple villages consecrated to the same benzhu. In every village around Erhai Lake, the local people have developed a peculiar mythology about their local lord, differing from that of neighboring villages. This tradition is similar to that of the City God Temple of Chinese religion.

=== Gods of nature ===
Other benzhu are gods of the generation of the local place. These include the God of the Mountain, the God of the Crops, the God of the Hunt, the Dragon King or the Mother Goddess of the Dragon King.

== Features ==
=== Benzhu festivals ===
Benzhu Festivals in Dali City take place according to the lunar calendar, after Chinese New Year. During festivals, the benzhu shrine are taken from the temples and carried through the towns to a different location where they stay for a number of days. The villagers follow the gods to the designated place burning incense and worshiping with food and money.

=== Psychology and shamanism ===
The Bai believe that the soul does not die with the body, but it can go to the "Kingdom of the Shades" helped by complex ritual ceremonies performed by the living community. Angry spirits can cause illness, but local gods can protect people against them. Illnesses are caused by the possession of evil spirits and they can be treated by female shamans.

=== Cult of the white stones ===
The Nama branch of the Bai, residing near the Mekong, preserves a cult of the white stones common to the ethnic groups descended from the Qiang people. Some believe they represent the bones of the ancestors, others that they are a representation of the Fire God, a deity worshipped around China.

== See also ==
- Azhaliism
- Bimoism
- Chinese ancestral worship
- Chinese Buddhism
- Chinese folk religion
- Confucianism
- Dongba
- Taoism
- Mo (religion)

== Bibliography ==
- Liang Yongjia. "Turning Gwer Sa La Festival into Intangible Cultural Heritage: State Superscription of Popular Religion in Southwest China". In: China: An International Journal. Volume 11, Number 2, August 2013. pp. 58-75
