= Fu Maoji =

Fu Maoji (Chinese: 傅懋勣; pinyin: Fù Màojī; 1911–1988) was a Chinese linguist. With Luo Changpei, he led the development of writing systems for national minority languages of China. He married Xu Lin, a linguist.

Fu obtained a degree in linguistics at Peking University in 1939 and in 1948 went to the University of Cambridge, where he obtained his doctorate in 1950 with a thesis on the grammar of the Yi language. In April 1952, he became chair of the Department of Minority Languages of the Institute of Linguistics. In 1955, he organized the Institute of Minority Languages under the auspices of the Chinese Academy of Sciences, becoming the vice director in 1956.
