= Xu Lin (linguist) =

Chinese linguist

- 徐琳
- Born: November 13, 1922; Kunming, Yunnan, China
- Died: August 9, 2005 (aged 82)
- Occupation: Linguist
- Spouse: Fu Maoji

Xu Lin (November 13, 1922 - August 9, 2005, Chinese: 徐琳) was a Chinese linguist who was focused on the study of minority languages. The establishment of the modern linguistics of the Bai language and the modern linguistics of the Lisu language was her primary contribution.

== Biography ==
Xu Lin was born into a Bai family in Kunming, Yunnan on November 13, 1922. She was initially from Qiaohou, Jianchuan County (now Eryuan County). She enrolled in Kunhua Girls' High School (Chinese: 云南省立昆华女中) in Yunnan in 1935. In 1938, she ceased her academic pursuits and enlisted in the Political Department of the 58th Army to engage in anti-Japanese publicity. In the second year of her degree, she enrolled in the Department of Chinese Language and Literature at Huachung University in 1942. She was subsequently relocated to the Department of Literature and History at Yunnan University in 1948. She matriculated from the department in 1950 and was subsequently appointed as an assistant editor at the editorial office of the Yunnan People's Broadcasting Station. Upon graduation in 1950, she was appointed as the assistant editor and chief of the literary and educational team in the editorial department of Yunnan People's Broadcasting Station.

In 1951, Xu relocated to the Institute of Languages of the Chinese Academy of Sciences (Chinese: 中国科学院语言研究所) to pursue employment. In 1956, the Institute of Ethnic Minority Languages of the Chinese Academy of Sciences (Chinese: 中国科学院少数民族语言研究所) was established. She served as an assistant researcher, associate researcher, and researcher there. In June 1980 and April 1981, she participated in academic exchanges at the Institute of Asian and African Languages and Cultures of the Tokyo University of Foreign Studies. She retired in 1987, but she continued to engage in academic activities. She served as the honorary director of the Chinese Minority Ancient Scripts Research Society (Chinese: 中国少数民族古文字研究会) and the executive director of the Chinese Minority Linguistics Society.

She was married to fellow linguist Fu Maoji. She died on August 9, 2005, at the age of 82.

== Books ==
- Institute of Minority Languages, Chinese Academy of Sciences (1959). Lisu Grammar Outline. Beijing: Science Publishing House.
- Xu, Lin; Zhao, Yansun (1984). A Brief History of Bai Language. Beijing: Publishing House of Minority Nationalities.
- Xu, Lin; Mu, Yuzhang; Gai, Xingzhi (1986). A Brief History of the Lisu Language. Beijing: Publishing House of Minority Nationalities.
- Zhao, Yansun; Xu (1996). Bai-Chinese Dictionary. Chengdu: Sichuan Ethnic Publishing House. ISBN 7-5409-1743-1.
- Xu, Lin (2008). Dali Series-Bai Language. Kunming: Yunnan Ethnic Publishing House. ISBN 978-7-5367-3879-9.
