= Torch Festival =

Holiday in southwest China

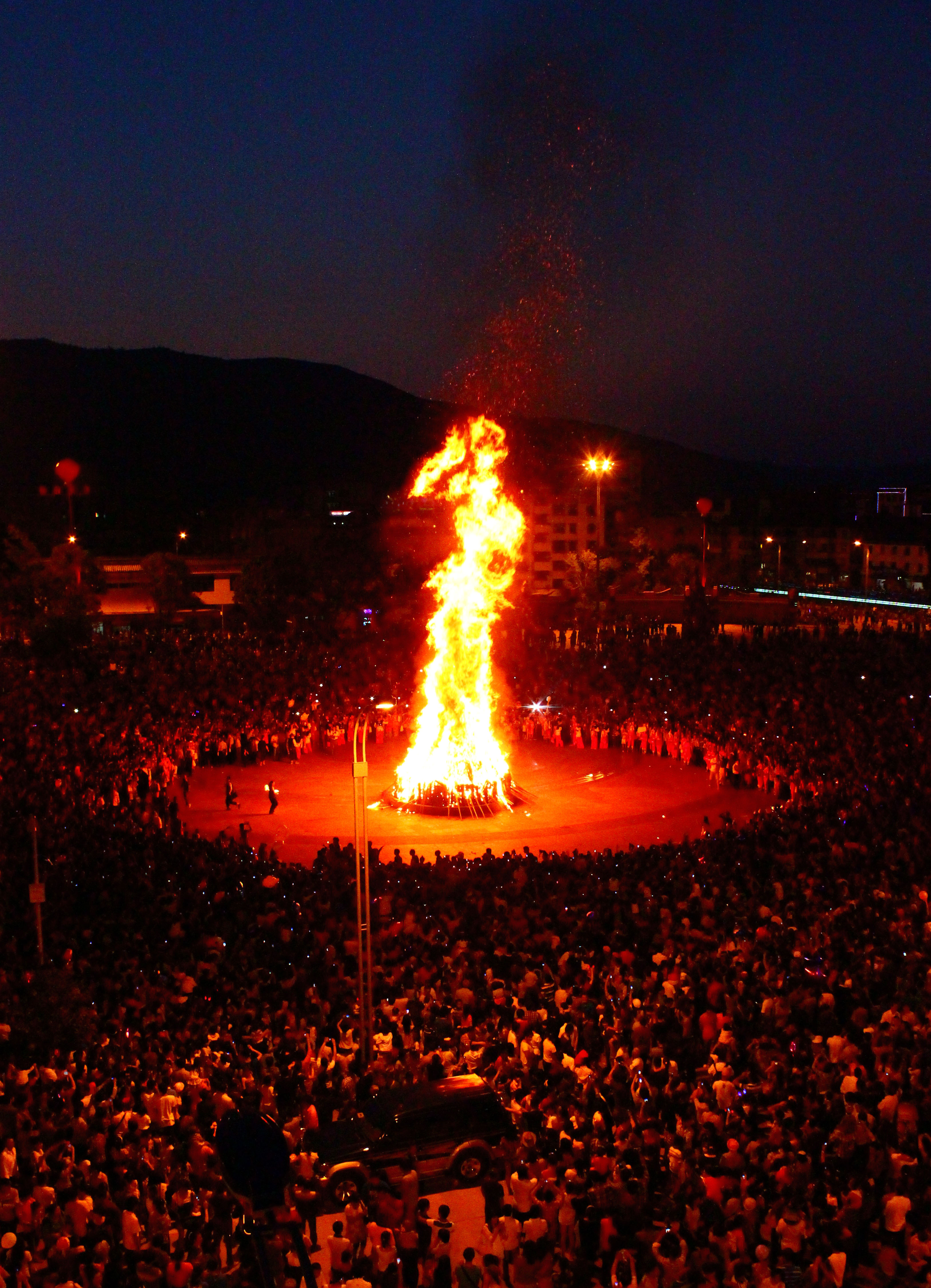
Torch Festival celebration in Eshan Yi Autonomous County, Yunnan, in 2012

The Torch Festival or Fire Festival (Chinese: 火把节; pinyin: Huǒbǎ Jié; Nuosu language: ꄔꊒ; YYPY Dut Zie; Bai: Huix‧zuit‧jiarx), also known as the Xinghui Festival (Chinese: 星回节; pinyin: Xīnghuí Jié; lit. 'return of the stars') is one of the main holidays of the Yi people of southwest China and is celebrated by other ethnic groups of the region (including the Bai, the Hani, the Lahu, the Naxi, and the Pumi) as well. It is celebrated on the 24th or 25th day of the sixth month of the Yi calendar, corresponding to August in the Gregorian calendar. It commemorates the legendary wrestler Atilabia, who drove away a plague of locusts using torches made from pine trees. Since 1993, the government of the Liangshan Yi Autonomous Prefecture in Sichuan has sponsored a modernised celebration of the festival featuring wrestling, horse racing, dance shows, and a beauty contest.

== Origin ==
The original Torch Festival, according to some scholars, was based on a calendar used by Bai and Yi people in ancient times. The calendar included 10 months, 36 days in a month, and two Star Returning Festivals in winter and summer respectively. The two Star Returning Festivals were both considered the New Year, and the one in summer was called the Torch Festival as people often lighted a torch on that day. There are also many other legends about the origin of the Torch Festival, yet all of them have the purpose of offering sacrifice to deities and dispelling ghosts, as a wish for a harvest.

== Observance ==
In the Torch Festival, every family needs to light a torch and hold the torch to illuminate the corners in the room and walk around the fields. Some villagers even have torch parade so as to drive away all bad lucks and pray for a harvest.

Preparations may begin a month in advance, with people gathering wormwood to make torches. Wormwood is especially popular around Liangshan, where it is believed to ward off evil. Typically, three torches are made per person.

The custom of holding a torch to shed light on tree and field was found in Han people in Southern Song dynasty. In Ming and Qing dynasties, people in Zhejiang and Jiangsu provinces had the custom as well. It most times started with the Emperor lighting the first flame of the bonfire after which he shared it with his Eunuchs and officials and these shared the fire with all other people in the kingdom.

After the torch parade is the Bonfire Party. People play musical instruments like yueqin (月琴) and sanxian (three stringed plucked instrument), singing and dancing for a whole night.

The festival also involves sacrifices of food and cattle. It is traditional to eat beef on the Torch Festival for good luck. Other traditional foods include noodles and fruit. It is customary to clean one's house, wear fine clothing, and hold sporting events including wrestling, horse races, and bullfights.

In modern times, the festival has become a tourist attraction. In Liangshan Yi Autonomous Prefecture, it is a local public holiday lasting multiple days.
