= Bimoism =

Indigenous religion of the Yi people

A symbol used to represent the Bimoist faith

Bimoism (Chinese: 毕摩教; pinyin: Bìmójiào, Yi: ꀘꂾ bi mox) is the indigenous religion of the Yi people, the largest ethnic group in Yunnan after the Han Chinese. It takes its name from the bimo, shaman-priests who are also masters of Yi language and scriptures, wearing distinctive black robes and large hats.

== Bimo ==
Bimo, which means 'master of scriptures', officiate at births, funerals, weddings, and holidays. One can become a bimo through patrilinial descent after a time of apprenticeship or through formally acknowledging an older, experienced bimo as their teacher. The title of suni (ꌠꑊ su nyit) is a lesser priest and an elected role and differs from that of the more revered role of bimo. Bimo can read Yi scripts while suni cannot. Both may perform rituals, but only bimo can perform rituals linked to death. Suni perform smaller rituals related to exorcisms to cure diseases. For the most part, suni are from humble, civilian backgrounds while bimo can be from both aristocratic and humble, civilian families.

The Yi worshipped and deified their ancestors in much the same way as the followers of other Chinese folk religion. They worshipped gods of nature like fire, hills, trees, rocks, water, earth, sky, wind, and forests. Bimoists also worship dragons that are believed to be protectors from bad spirits which cause illness, poor harvests, and other misfortunes. Bimoists believe in multiple souls, and that at death, one soul remains to watch the grave while the other is eventually reincarnated into some living form. When someone dies, followers sacrifice a pig or sheep at the doorway in order yo maintain relationship with the deceased spirit.

At one time, the Chinese government considered bimo a negative influence by promoting beliefs from a "backwards religion." Now this poor perspective of them has changed with the government promoting them as offial ambassadors of Yi culture. The bimo organise large-scale rituals for the yearly Torch Festival. Since the 1980s, the shift to a more lax stance on religious restrictions in China has resulted in Bimoism undergoing a revitalisation. In 1996, the Bimo Culture Research Center was founded. Since the early 2010s, the government of China has helped the revival of the Bimoist faith through new construction of large temples and ceremonial complexes.

== Folklore ==
The most famous hero in Yi mythology is Zhyge Alu. He was the son of a dragon and an eagle who possessed supernatural strength, anti-magic, and anti-ghost powers. He rode a nine-winged flying horse called "long heavenly wings." He also had the help of a magical peacock and python. The magical peacock was called Shuotnyie Voplie and could deafen the ears of those who heard its cry, but if invited into one's house, would consume evil and expel leprosy. The python, called Bbahxa Ayuosse, was defeated by Zhyge Alu, who wrestled with it in the ocean after transforming into a dragon. It was said to be able to detect leprosy, cure tuberculosis, and eradicate epidemics. Like the Chinese mythological archer, Hou Yi, Zhyge Alu shoots down the suns to save the people. In the Yi religion Bimoism, Zhyge Alu aids the bimo priests in curing leprosy and fighting ghosts.

Jiegujienuo was a ghost that caused dizziness, slowness in action, dementia and anxiety. The ghost was blamed for ailments and exorcism rituals were conducted to combat the ghost. The bimo erected small sticks considered to be sacred, the kiemobbur, at the ritual site in preparation.

=== Torch Festival ===
The Torch Festival is one of the Yi people's main holidays. According to Yi legend, there were once two men of great strength, Sireabi and Atilaba. Sireabi lived in heaven while Atilaba on earth. When Sireabi heard of Atilaba's strength, he challenged Atilaba to a wrestling match. After suffering two defeats, Sireabi was killed in a bout, which greatly angered the bodhisattavas, who sent a plague of locusts to punish the earth. On the 24th day of the 6th month of the lunar calendar, Atilaba cut down many pine trees and used them as torches to kill the locusts, protecting the crops from destruction. The Torch Festival is thus held in his honor.

== See also ==
- Benzhuism
- Chinese folk religion
- Dongbaism
- Moism
- Taoism
- Wuism

== Bibliography ==
- Pan Jiao, Institute of Anthropology, Minzu University of China. The State's Presence in the Religious Revival in the Liangshan Yi Ethnic Area. In: Religious Revival in Ethnic Areas of China. Asia Research Institute, National University of Singapore, 2011.
- Olivia Kraef, Institute of Sinology, Free University of Berlin. Mapping Li(a)ngshan – The Changing Implications of Yi (Nuosu) Bimo Culture. In: Religious Revival in Ethnic Areas of China. Asia Research Institute, National University of Singapore, 2011.
