= Chongsheng Temple (Yunnan) =

Buddhist temple in Dali, Yunnan, China

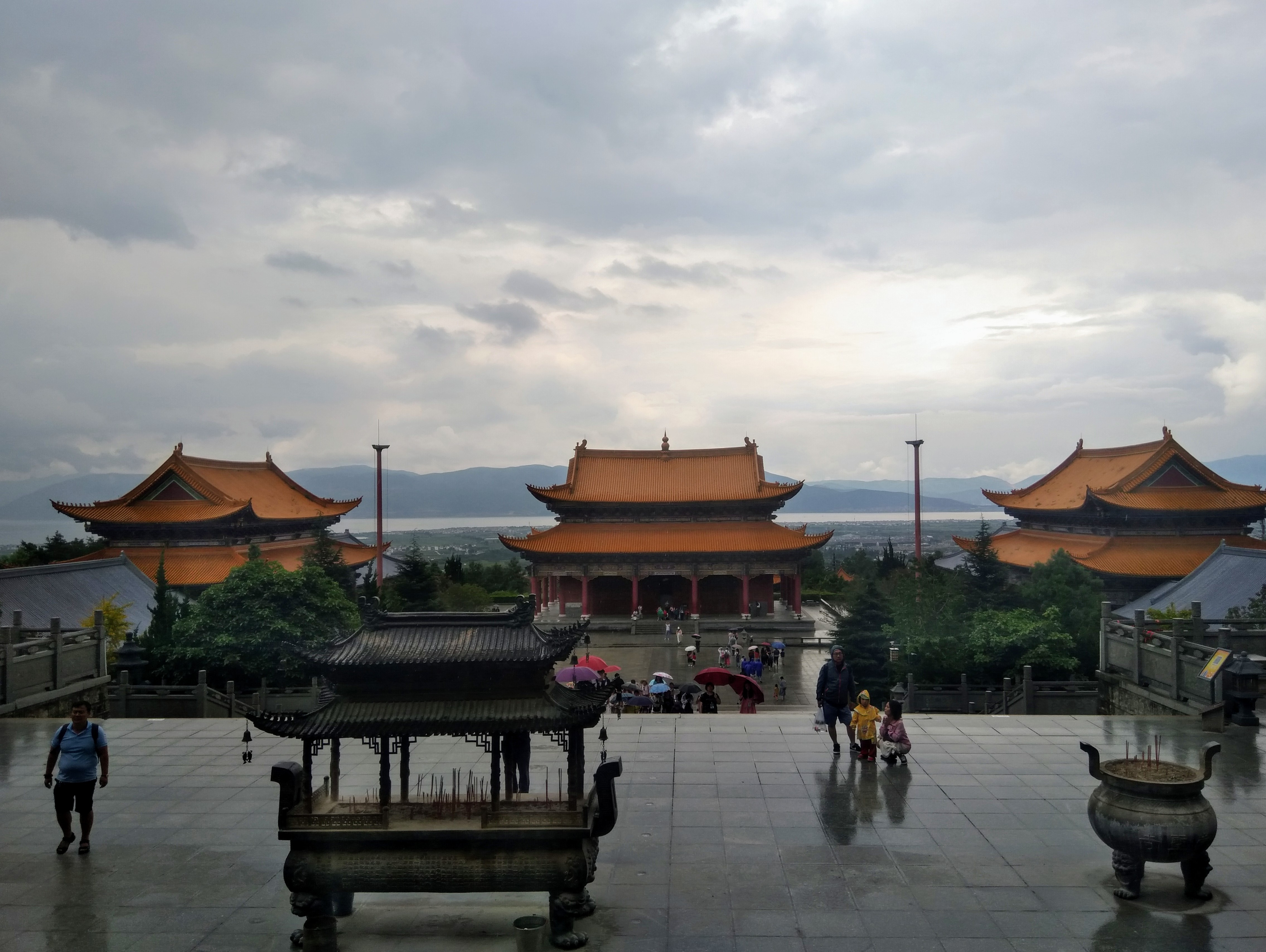
- Parts of Chongshen Temple as seen from Daxiong Hall

Religion
- Affiliation: Buddhism

Location
- Location: Dali, Yunnan, China
- Interactive map of Chongsheng Temple
- Coordinates: 25°42′27″N 100°08′33″E

Chongsheng Temple, (simplified Chinese: 崇圣寺; traditional Chinese: 崇聖寺; pinyin: Chóngshèng Sì, also known as SanTa Si or Tianlong Si), is a Buddhist temple near the old town of Dali in Yunnan province, southern China. The Three Pagodas are part of the complex.

It was once the royal temple of the Kingdom of Dali, originally built in the 9th century. At its height, the temple included 891 rooms, 11,400 Buddhist iconographies, three pavilions, and seven buildings. The temple was severely damaged by earthquakes and conflict during the rule of the Qing Dynasty, but was later rebuilt in 2005.

== See also ==
- List of Buddhist temples
- Architecture of the Song dynasty
