= Three Pagodas =

Ensemble of three pagodas in Yunnan, China

Three Pagodas of Chongsheng Temple
- Three Pagodas of Chong Sheng Temple

- Location in Yunnan

Religion
- Affiliation: Buddhism

Location
- Country: China
- Coordinates: 25.708725°N 100.147236°E

The Three Pagodas of the Chongsheng Temple (Chinese: 崇圣寺三塔; pinyin: Chóngshèng Sì Sāntǎ) are an ensemble of three independent pagodas arranged on the corners of an equilateral triangle, near the old town of Dali, Yunnan province, China, dating from the time of the Kingdom of Nanzhao and Kingdom of Dali in the 9th and 10th centuries.

The Three Pagodas are located about 1.5 km (0.93 mi) north of Dali old town. They are at the east foot of the tenth peak of the massive Cangshan Mountains and face the west shore of the Erhai Lake of ancient Dali.

== Description ==
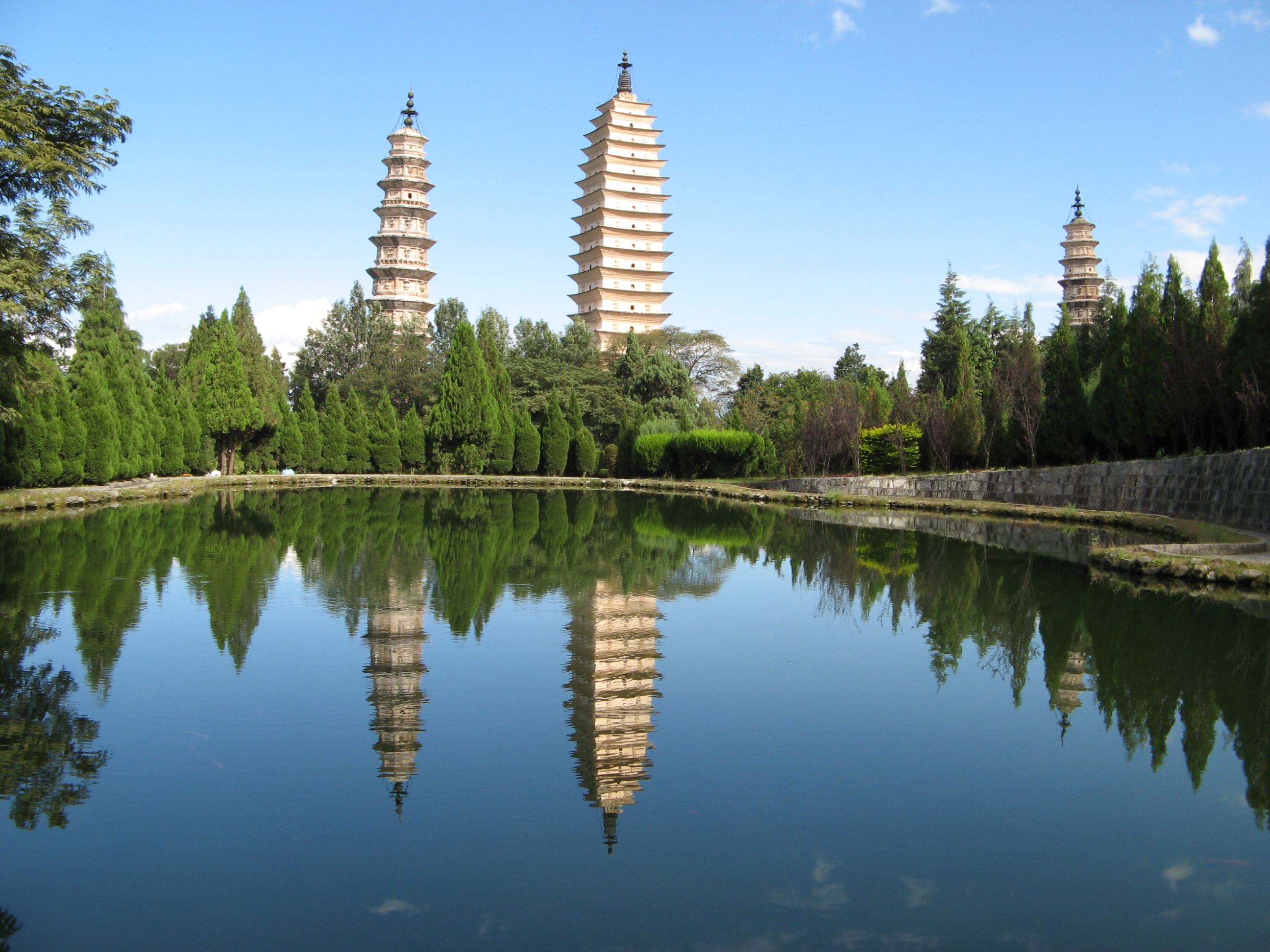
Reflection Pond mirroring the image of the Three Pagodas.

The Three Pagodas are made of brick and covered with white mud. As its name implies, the Three Pagodas is composed of three independent pagodas forming a symmetric triangle. The elegant, balanced and stately style is unique in China's ancient Buddhist architectures, which makes it a must-see in the tour of Dali. The Three Pagodas, visible from miles away, has been a landmark of Dali City and selected as a national treasure meriting preservation in China.

The main pagoda, known as Qianxun Pagoda (Chinese: 千寻塔; pinyin: Qiānxún Tǎ), reportedly built during 823-840 CE by king Quan Fengyou (劝丰佑) of the Kingdom of Nanzhao, is 69.6 meters (227 feet) high and is one of the tallest pagodas in China's history. The central pagoda is square shaped and composed of sixteen stories; each story has multiple tiers of upturned eaves. There is a carved shrine containing a white marble sitting Buddha statue at the center of each façade of every story. The body of the pagoda is hollow from the first to the eighth story, surrounded with 3.3 meters (10 feet) thick walls. In 1978, more than 700 Buddhist antiques, including sculptures made of gold, silver, wood or crystal and documents, were found in the body during a major repairing work. The designers of the pagoda are supposed to have come from Chang'an (present-day Xi’an), the capital of the Tang dynasty at that time and the location of another pagoda, Small Wild Goose Pagoda, which shares the similar style but is one hundred years older.

The other two sibling pagodas, built about one hundred years later, stand to the northwest and southwest of Qianxun Pagoda. They are 42.19 meters (140 feet) high. Different from Qianxun Pagoda, they are solid and octagonal with ten stories. The center of each side of every story is decorated with a shrine containing a Buddha statue.

A lake is located behind the pagodas. Named Reflection Pond (Chinese: 聚影池; pinyin: Jùyǐng Chí), the pond is known to be able to reflect images of the Three Pagodas.

== History ==
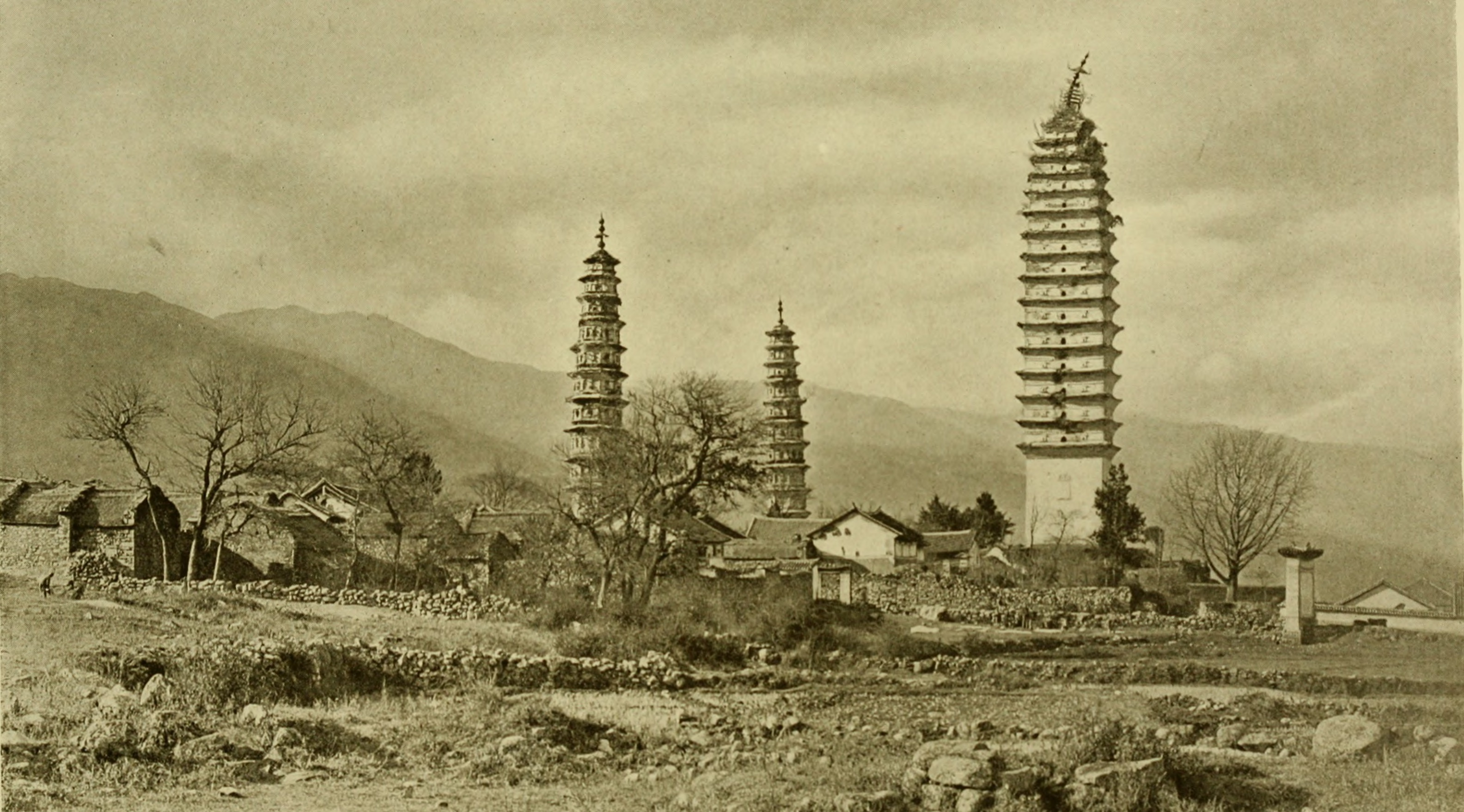
The pagodas in 1918

The Three Pagodas were initially built for auspicious reasons. According to local legends, Dali was once a swamp inhabited by breeding dragons before the humans arrived. As the dragons, which were believed to deliberately create natural disasters to dispel human intruders, revered pagodas, the Three Pagodas were built to deter the dragons.

The Three Pagodas are well known for their resilience; they have endured several man-made and natural catastrophes over more than one thousand years. Their mother building was known as Chongsheng Temple (Chinese: 崇圣寺; pinyin: Chóngshèng Sì) and was once the royal temple of the Kingdom of Dali. It was originally built at the same time as the first pagoda, but was destroyed in a fire during the rule of the Qing dynasty. The temple was later rebuilt in 2005. It was recorded that Qianxun Pagoda had been split in an earthquake on May 6, 1515 AD (Ming dynasty). However, it miraculously recovered ten days later in an aftershock. The most recent record of severe earthquake in the Dali area occurred in 1925. Only one in one hundred buildings in Dali survived, but the Three Pagodas were undamaged.

The central Qianxun Pagoda was built sometime in the latter half of the 9th century (after the Kaicheng period, 836–840). During repairs in 1979, three copper plates were found at the bottom of the steeple which recorded the exact years of previous repairs, those being 1000, 1142, and 1145.

== Gallery ==
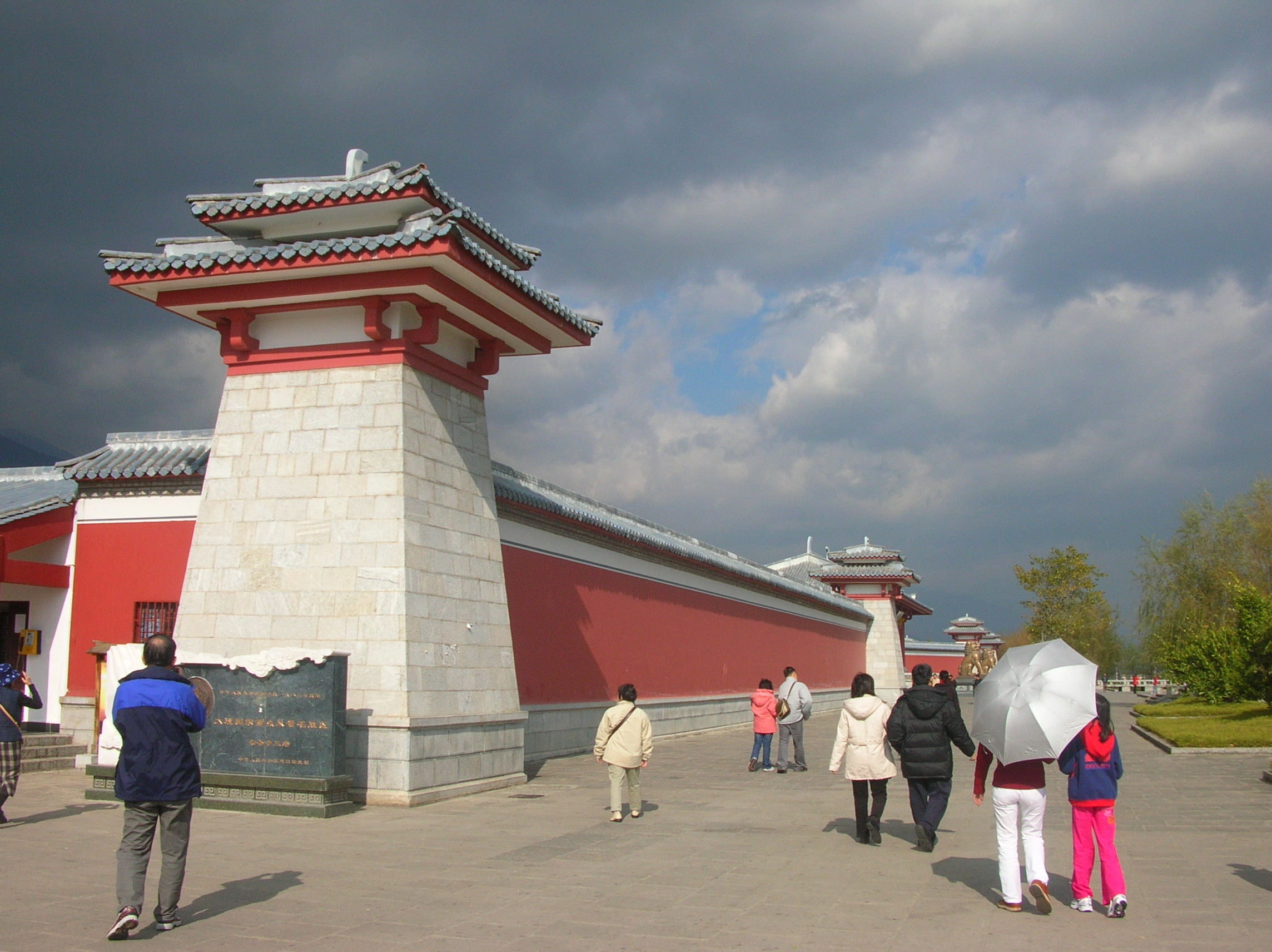
The entrance to the Three Pagodas

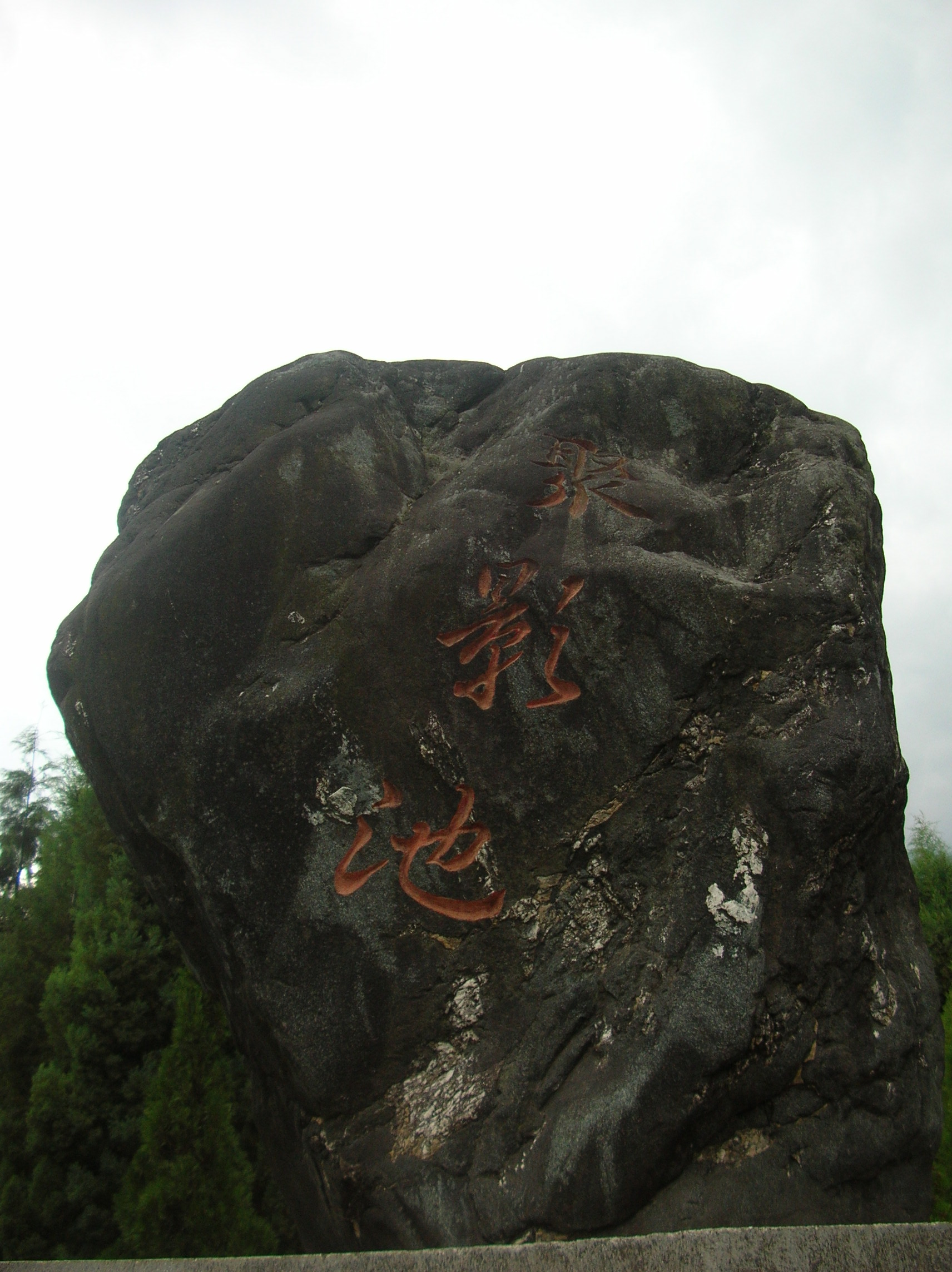
Juying Reflection lake's sign (Chinese: 聚影池; pinyin: jù yǐng chí)

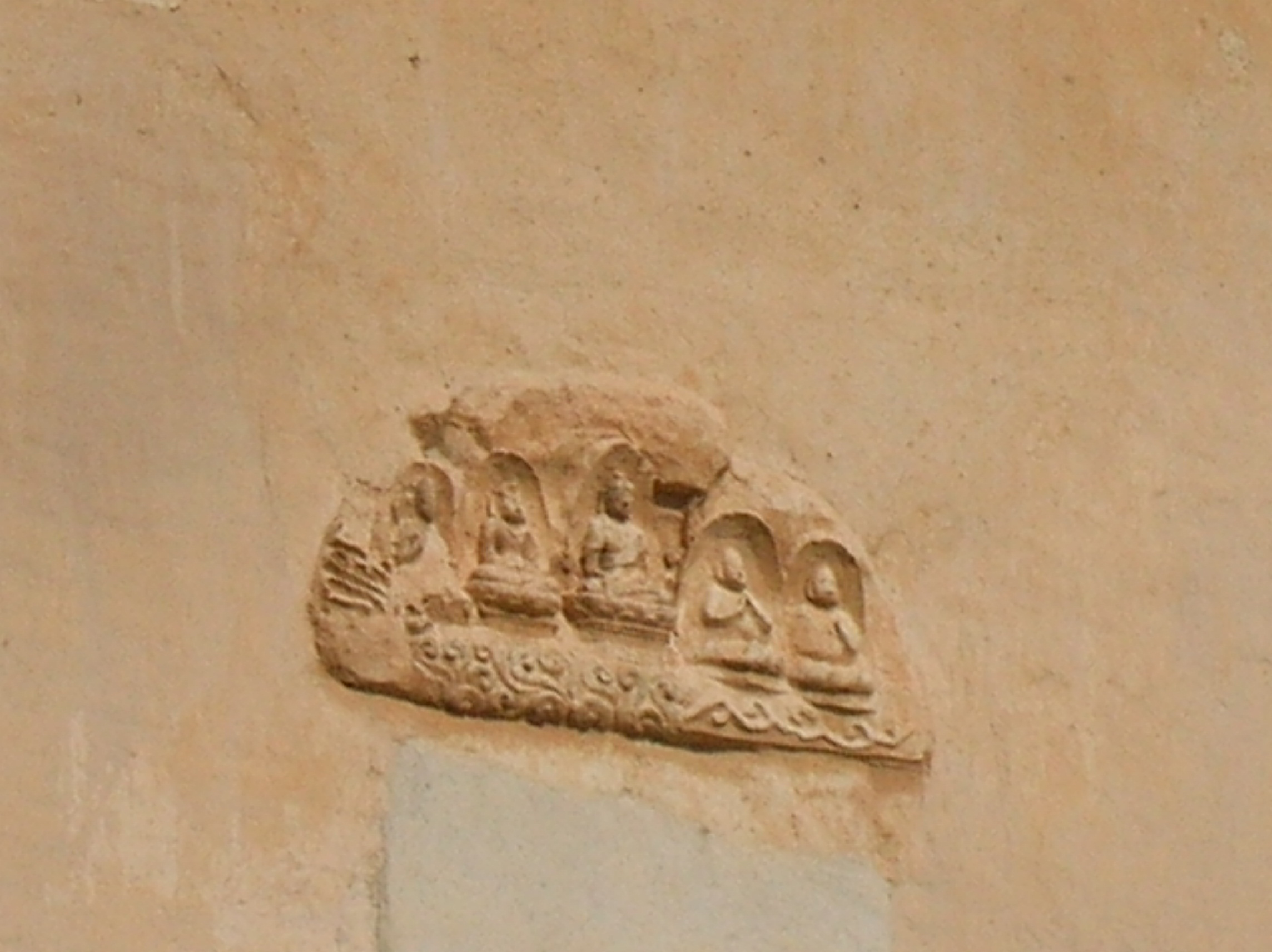
Buddha carvings on the middle Pagoda.

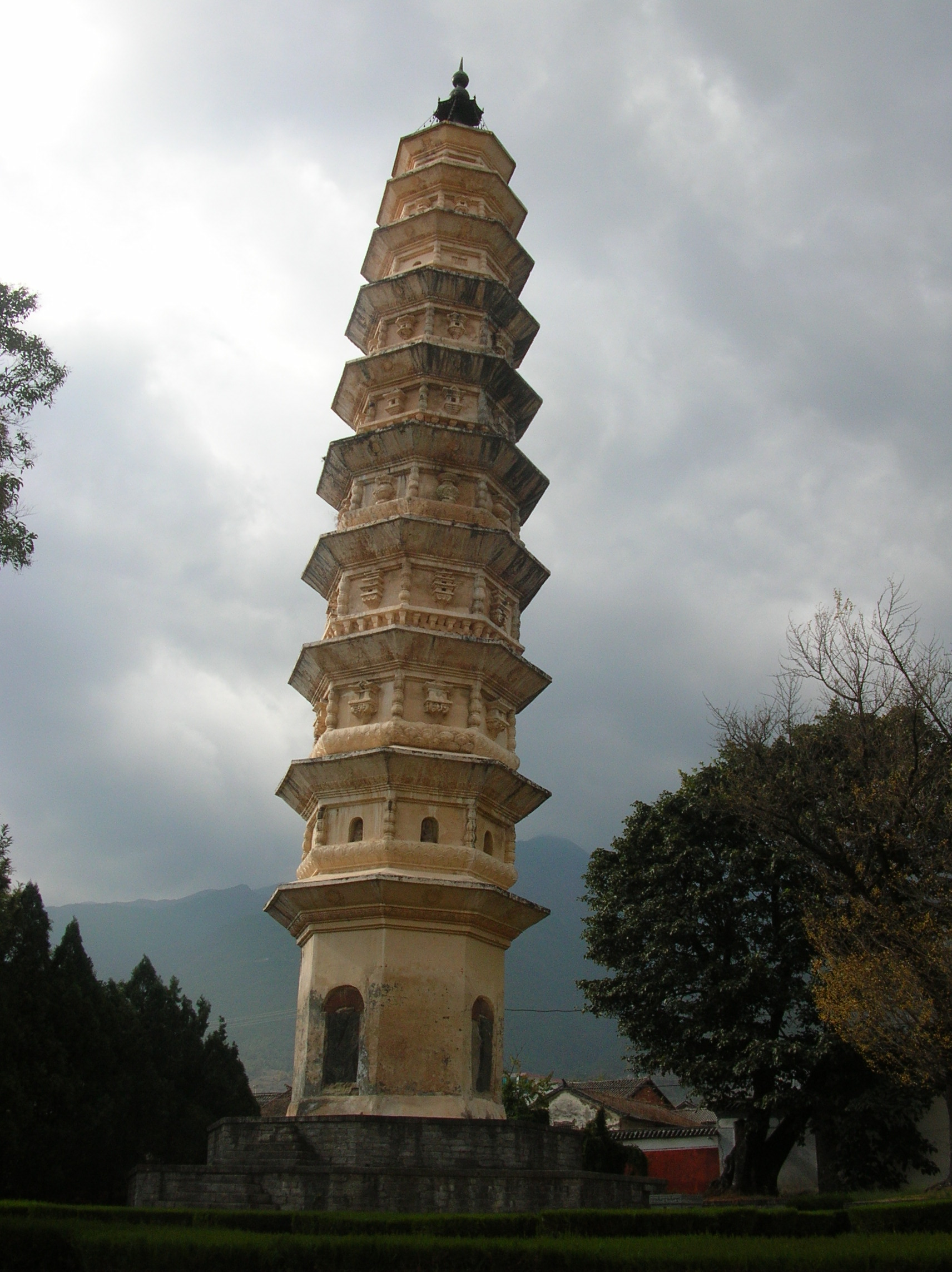
The left Pagoda, which leans to one side due to inadequate strength of foundation.

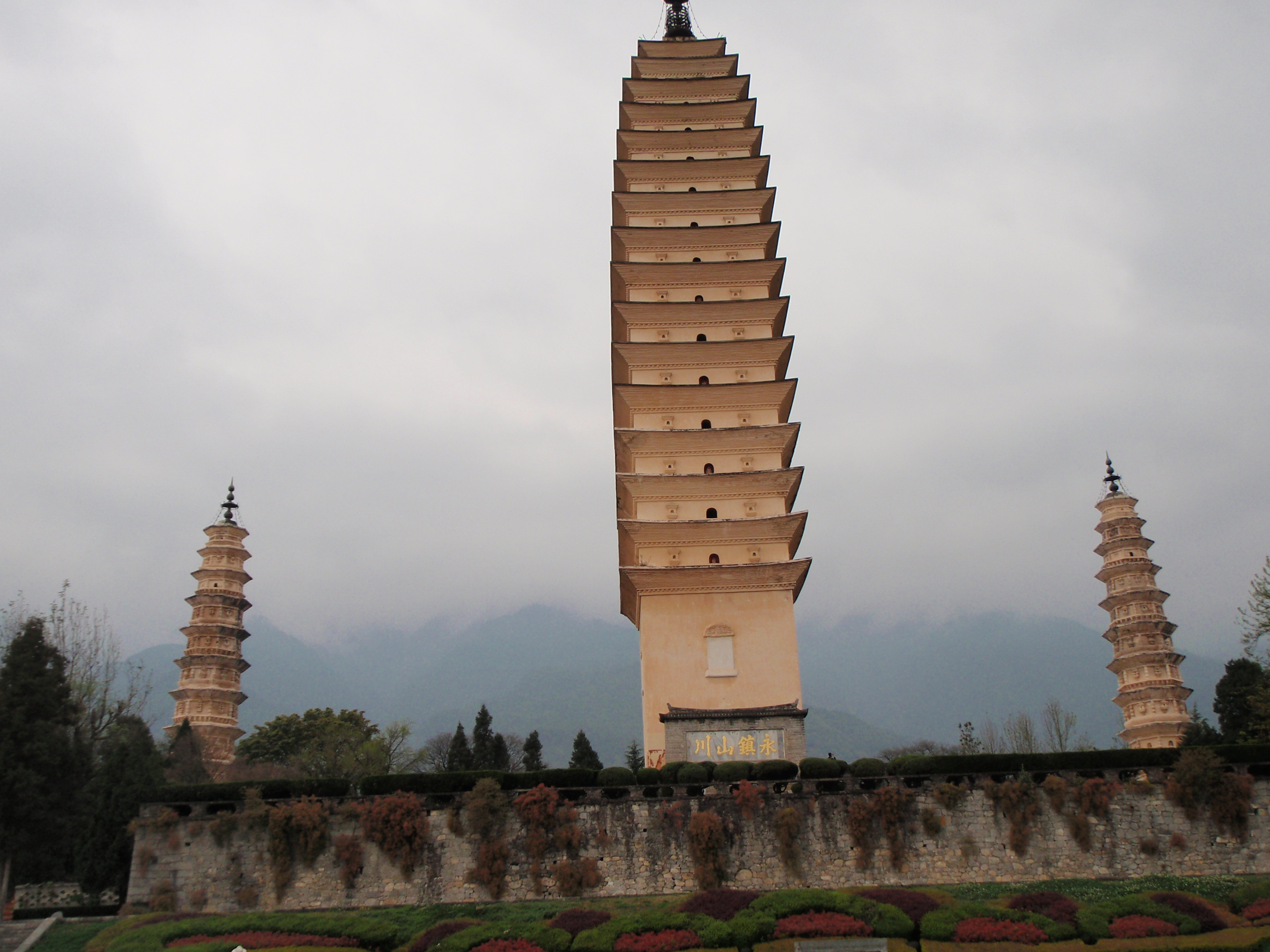

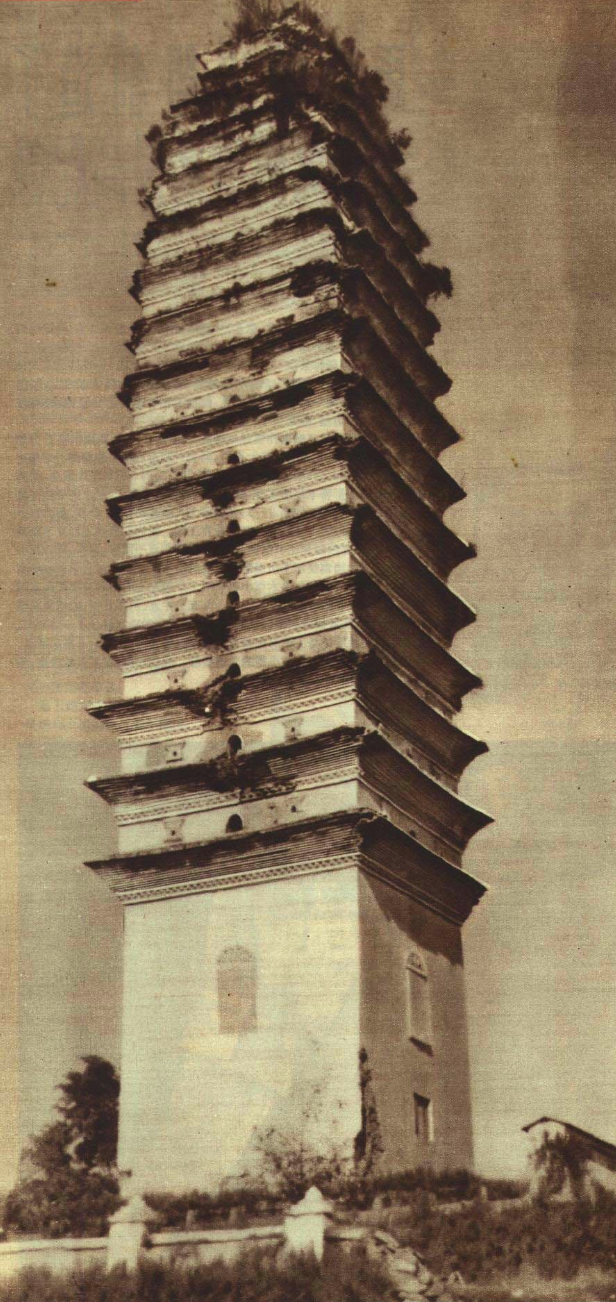
Chongsheng Pagoda in 1952

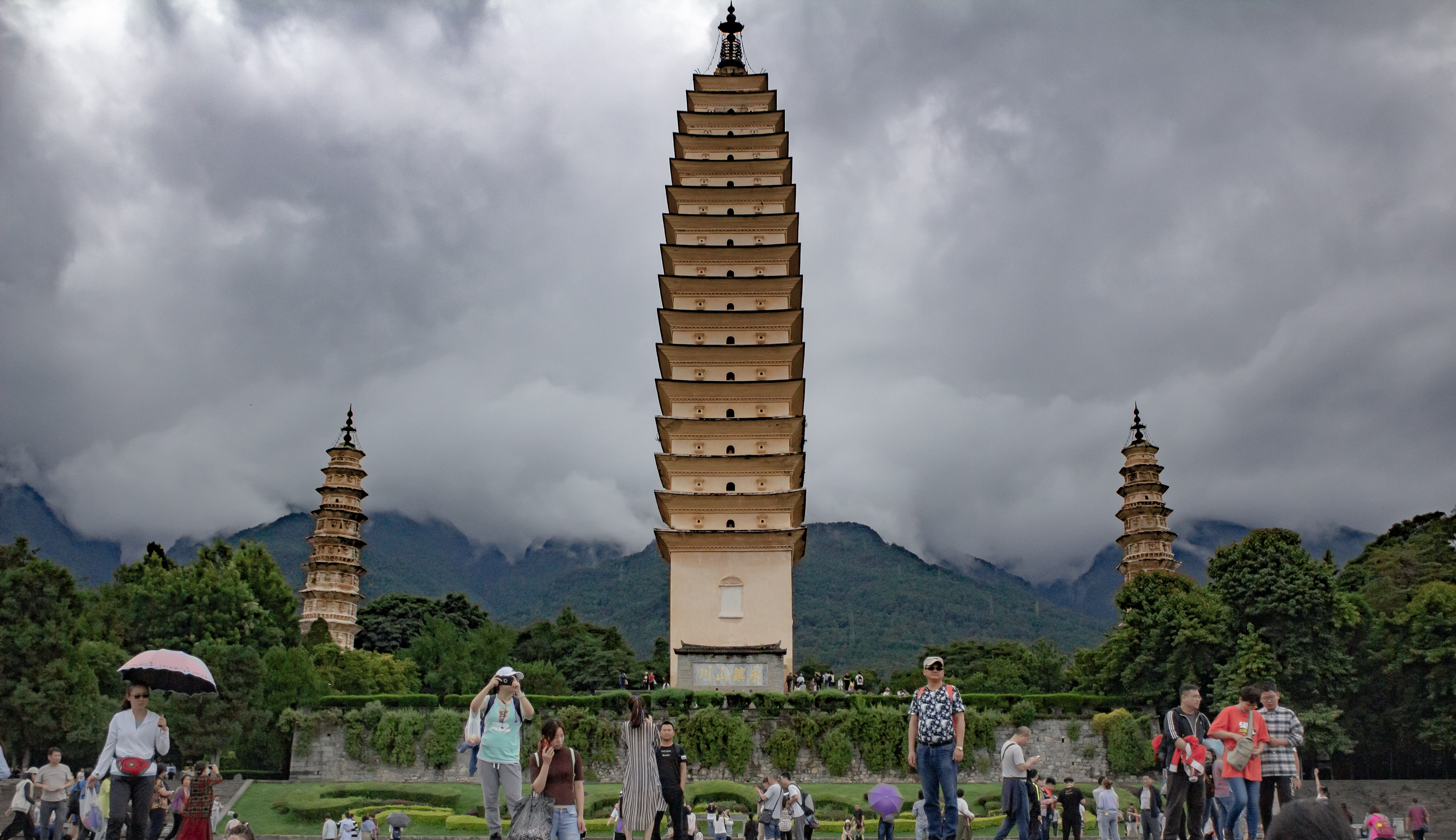
The Three Pagodas, taken from the entrance

== See also ==
- List of Buddhist temples
- Chinese architecture
- List of tallest structures built before the 20th century
