= Ziqi =

Ziqi could refer to:

== People ==
- Dong Ziqi (Chinese: 董子齐; born 1999), Chinese curler
- Feng Ziqi (born 1999), Chinese freestyle wrestler
- Li Ziqi (politician) (Chinese: 李子奇), Chinese politician
- Li Ziqi (vlogger) (Chinese: 李子柒), Chinese vlogger
- Wang Ziqi (Chinese: 王子奇), Chinese actor
- Xiong Ziqi (Chinese: 熊梓淇), Chinese actor and singer
- Zhou Ziqi (Chinese: 周自齊), Chinese educator and politician

== Other ==
- Ziqi (kingdom) (Chinese: 自杞国), kingdom in modern-day southwestern China from 1100 to 1259
