= Zhaoming =

Zhaoming may refer to:

- Zhao Ming of Shang, prehistoric ancestor of the Shang kings
- Xiao Tong (501–531), also known as Crown Prince Zhaoming, crown prince of the Liang dynasty
- Duan Suying (died 1009), also known as Emperor Zhaoming, emperor of Dali
