= Duan Siping =

Emperor of Dali

Emperor Taizu of Dali 大理太祖
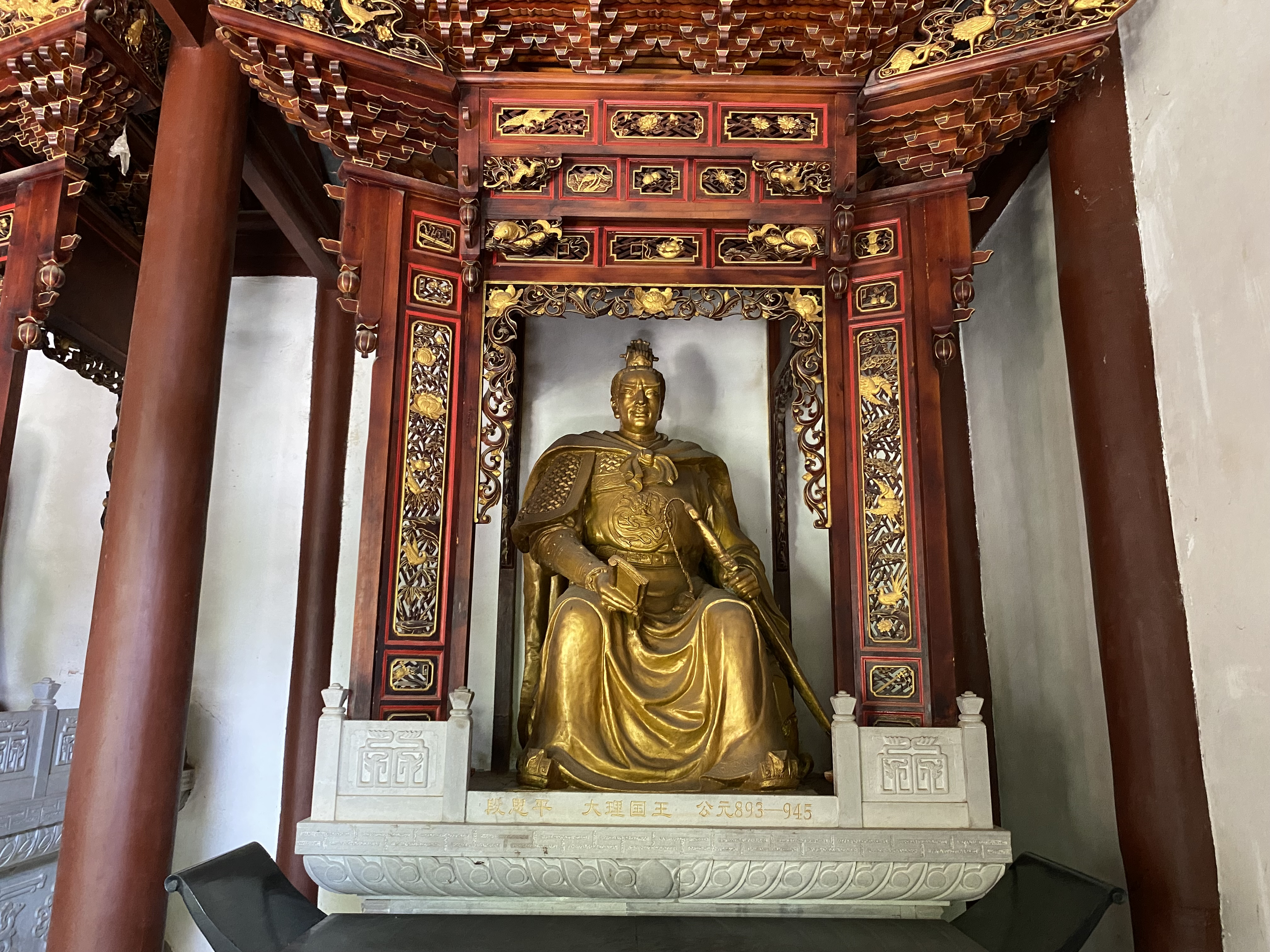
- Statue of Duan Siping enshrined in the Juchang King Temple in Tonghai County

Emperor of Dali
- Reign: 937–944
- Successor: Duan Siying
- Born: 893; Xizhou, Dali
- Died: 944 (aged 50–51); Dengzhou
Era dates
- Wende (文德; 937–944)
Posthumous name
- Emperor Shengshen Wenwu (聖神文武皇帝)
Temple name
- Taizu (太祖)
- Dynasty: Dali
- Father: Duan Baolong

Duan Siping
- Chinese: 段思平
Transcriptions
Standard Mandarin
- Hanyu Pinyin: Duàn Sīpíng

Duan Siping (Chinese: 段思平; pinyin: Duàn Sīpíng, IPA: [twân sí.pʰǐŋ]; Bai: Duainb six-pienp), also known by his temple name as the Emperor Taizu of Dali, was the founder and first emperor of the Dali Kingdom. The Dali Kingdom would last until the Mongol conquest in 1253 led by Kublai Khan and its territories would later be ruled by the Yuan dynasty.

== Biography ==
Duan Siping was a member of the Bai ethnic group. The Duan clan is professed to also have Han ancestry. The Dian zaiji (Chinese: 滇載記) records that Duan's ancestor was from Wuwei and, having assisted the Meng clan in battle, was awarded with political rank. However, "his descendant six generations later, Siping, was born under different omens."

Duan was a governor of Tonghai County. Yang Ganzhen (Chinese: 楊干貞), ruler of the Dayining kingdom, feared him and attempted to imprison. Duan went into hiding and gathered soldiers and horses to fight. Allegedly, Duan was eating a wild peach, when he noticed two characters written on the fruit's skin: qing xi 青昔. Duan determined that the first character, qing, referred to the twelfth month, whilst the second, xi, indicated the twenty-first day. He understood this as an omen of when he should attack Great Yining.
