= Dali Kingdom =

Former Bai state

Dali Kingdom 大理國 Dablit Guaif
- 937–1094, 1096–1253; (1094–1096: Dazhong Kingdom)
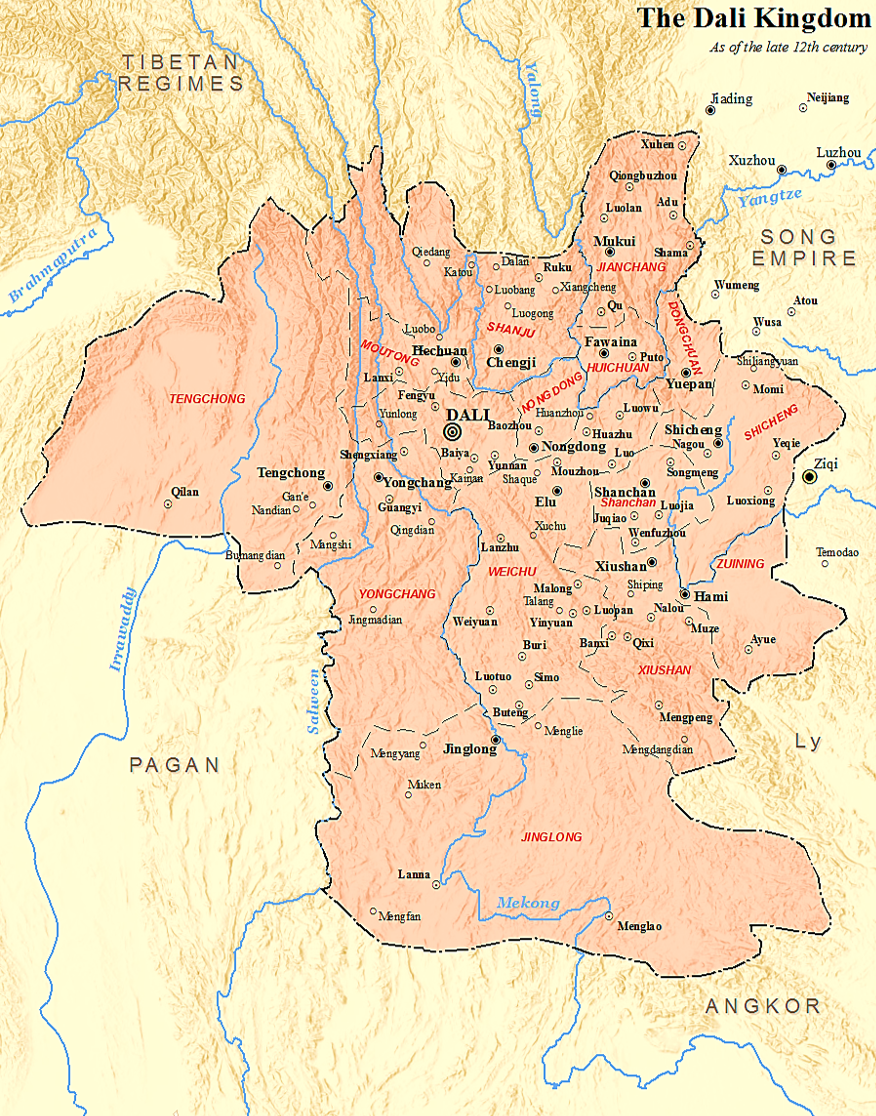
- Map of Dali in the late 12th century
- Status: Song dynasty tributary state (982–1253)
- Capital: Yangjumie (in present-day Dali Town, Yunnan)
- Common languages: Written Classic Chinese (court, dynastic, literary); Bai
- Religion: Buddhism
- Government: Monarchy
- Emperor
  - 937–944: Duan Siping
  - 1081–1094: Duan Zhengming
  - 1096–1108: Duan Zhengchun
  - 1172–1200: Duan Zhixing
  - 1251–1254: Duan Xingzhi
- History
  - Established: 937
  - Coup d'etat by Gao Shengtai: 1094
  - Reestablished: 1096
  - Conquered by the Mongol Empire: 1253
Preceded by
Nanzhao
Dayining
Dazhong
Succeeded by
Dazhong
Mongol Empire
Möng Mao
- Today part of: China; Laos; Myanmar

Dali Kingdom

Chinese name
- Traditional Chinese: 大理國
- Simplified Chinese: 大理国
- Literal meaning: State of Dali
Transcriptions
Standard Mandarin
- Hanyu Pinyin: Dàlǐ Guó
- IPA: [tâ.lì.kwǒ]

Alternative Chinese name
- Traditional Chinese: 後大理 後理國
- Simplified Chinese: 后大理 后理国
Transcriptions
Standard Mandarin
- Hanyu Pinyin: Hòu Dàlǐ; Hòu Lǐ Guó
- IPA: [xôʊ tâ.lì]

Vietnamese name
- Vietnamese alphabet: Vương quốc Đại Lý
- Hán-Nôm: 王國大理

Bai name
- Bai: Dablit Guaif

The Dali Kingdom, also known as the Dali State (traditional Chinese: 大理國; simplified Chinese: 大理国; pinyin: Dàlǐ Guó; Bai: Dablit Guaif), was a Bai dynastic state situated in modern Yunnan province, China, from 937 to 1253. In 1253, it was occupied by the Mongols. However, descendants of its ruling house continued to administer the area as tusi chiefs under Mongol occupation until the Ming conquest of Yunnan in 1382. The former capital of the Dali Kingdom remains known as Dali in modern Yunnan Province today.

== Name ==
The Dali Kingdom takes its name from Dali City. Famed for its high quality marble, Dali (dàlǐ 大理) literally means "marble" in Chinese.

Dali marble is famous throughout Asia and among collectors of gemstones all over the world. For a few square inches of Shuimohuashi, a particularly precious type of marble, dealers in Hong Kong or Shanghai can charge up to $20,000. For more than 1,000 years Dali has been known as the town of marble; indeed, the Chinese word dali means “marble.”

— Barbara A. West

== History ==
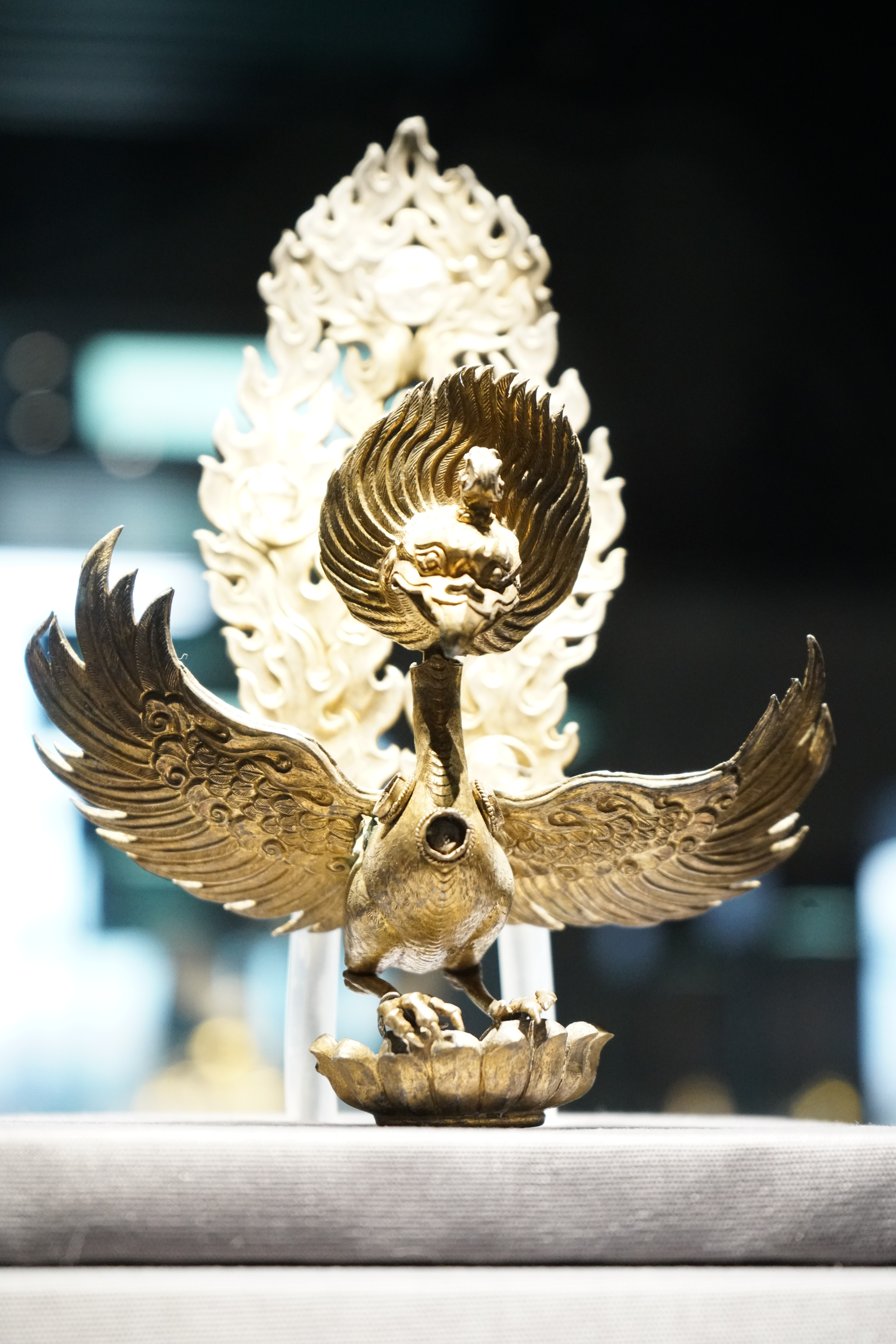
Gilt Silver Statue of Ganruda inlaid with crystal beads, found at the Qianxun Pagoda of Chongsheng Temple, exhibited at Yunnan Provincial Museum.

=== Origins ===
Nanzhao was overthrown in 902. Three dynasties ruling successor kingdoms, Great Changhe (903-927), Great Tianxing (927-928), and Great Yining (928-937), followed in quick succession. Duan Siping seized power in 937, establishing himself at Dali. The Duan clan professed to have Han ancestry. Certain Chinese records said the Duan family came from Wuwei in Gansu:

Yuan records claim that the Dali kingdom’s Duan rulers originally came from Wuwei Commandery in modern-day Gansu Province, but this is not confirmed by Song or Dali sources. A significant change from Nanzhao is apparent in Dali rulers’ naming practices, which generally do not follow the patronymic linkage system. This suggests that the Dali elites presented themselves as more “Chinese” than their Nanzhao counterparts.

— Megan Bryson

Nanzhao's last ruler, Shunhuazhen (r. 897-902), was deposed by the chief minister (buxie), Zheng Maisi. Zheng Maisi was descended from a Tang official named Zheng Hui, who had been captured by Nanzhao in 756 and rose to become Nanzhao's imperial tutor and chief minister. Zheng Maisi changed his name to Zheng Chang and proclaimed a new reign era named Anguo for the Great Changhe Kingdom. Great Changhe portrayed itself as the successor to both the Tang dynasty and Nanzhao. Zhang Maisi's successor, Zheng Renmin (r. 910-927), attacked Former Shu in 914 but suffered a heavy defeat. Renmin sent his grand councillor (buxie), Duan Yizong, to Former Shu, possibly to secure a marriage alliance. In 925, another mission led by the buxie Zheng Zhaochun secured a marriage alliance with Southern Han, whose ruler gave his daughter, the Zengcheng Princess, as wife. After the Later Tang defeated Former Shu and returned thousands of captives to Great Changhe, another marriage alliance mission was sent to Later Tang in 927 which ended unsuccessfully.

In 927, Zheng Renmin was killed by the Dongchuan/Jianchuan jiedushi Yang Ganzhen, a White Mywa noble who aided the chief minister, Zhao Shanzheng, in overthrowing the Zheng family. Zhao was enthroned as the ruler of the Great Tianxing Kingdom, but within a year Yang killed him and declared the Great Yining Kingdom (929-937). In 934, Duan Siping, an official in the Tonghai Area Command, organized a coalition of Nanzhao sympathizers and overthrew the Yang regime.

=== Relations with the Song dynasty ===
Dali's relationship with the Song was cordial throughout its entire existence. Dali congratulated the Song dynasty on the conquest of Later Shu in 965 and voluntarily established tribute relations in 982. It was however essentially an independent state. The Song sometimes refused tribute from Dali, fearing that closer ties might draw them into costly wars like those the Tang had fought against Dali's predecessor, Nanzhao. The Song founder Song Taizu declared all land south of the Dadu River to be Dali territory and did not desire to pursue any further claims to avoid the Tang dynasty's disastrous efforts against Nanzhao.

Dali relations with the Song differed markedly from Nanzhao-Tang relations. When the first Song emperor, Taizu, came to power, he declared that, in light of Tang difficulties in the Southwest, he would forfeit the Yue and Sui Commanderies and use the Dadu River as the border with Dali. His successors followed this policy, so contact between the Song and Dali was minimal. Song records show reluctance to engage with Dali directly in any way, even through the standard tributary relationship of vassal (Dali) and lord (Song). Because of Song officials’ wariness, Dali was only allowed to offer tribute at the Song court on three occasions. Their requests to offer tribute were repeatedly rejected on the grounds that they would cause trouble for Song, as Nanzhao had for Tang.

— Megan Bryson

Dali's primary importance to the Song dynasty was its horses, which were highly prized and sought after as military assets, especially after the fall of the Northern Song. They were described by a Song official in the following passage:

These horses possess a shape [that is] quite magnificent. They stand low with a muscular front, very similar to the shape of a chicken. The diaphragm is broad, shoulders thick, waist flat, and back round. They are trained to squat on their rear ends like a dog. They easily climb steep terrain on command and possess both speed and agility in chase. They have been raised on bitter buckwheat, so they require little to maintain. How could a horse like this not be considered a good horse?

During the Southern Song period (1127–1279), refugees from Guangxi were resettled in Dali territory to prevent upland raiding. A stele documents refugees who fled to Dali c. 1141-50. The author of the stele credits Duke Gao Liangcheng of Dali for leading troops to assist refugees. He granted land and enfeoffed those who came from afar.

=== Dazhong Kingdom (1094–1096) ===
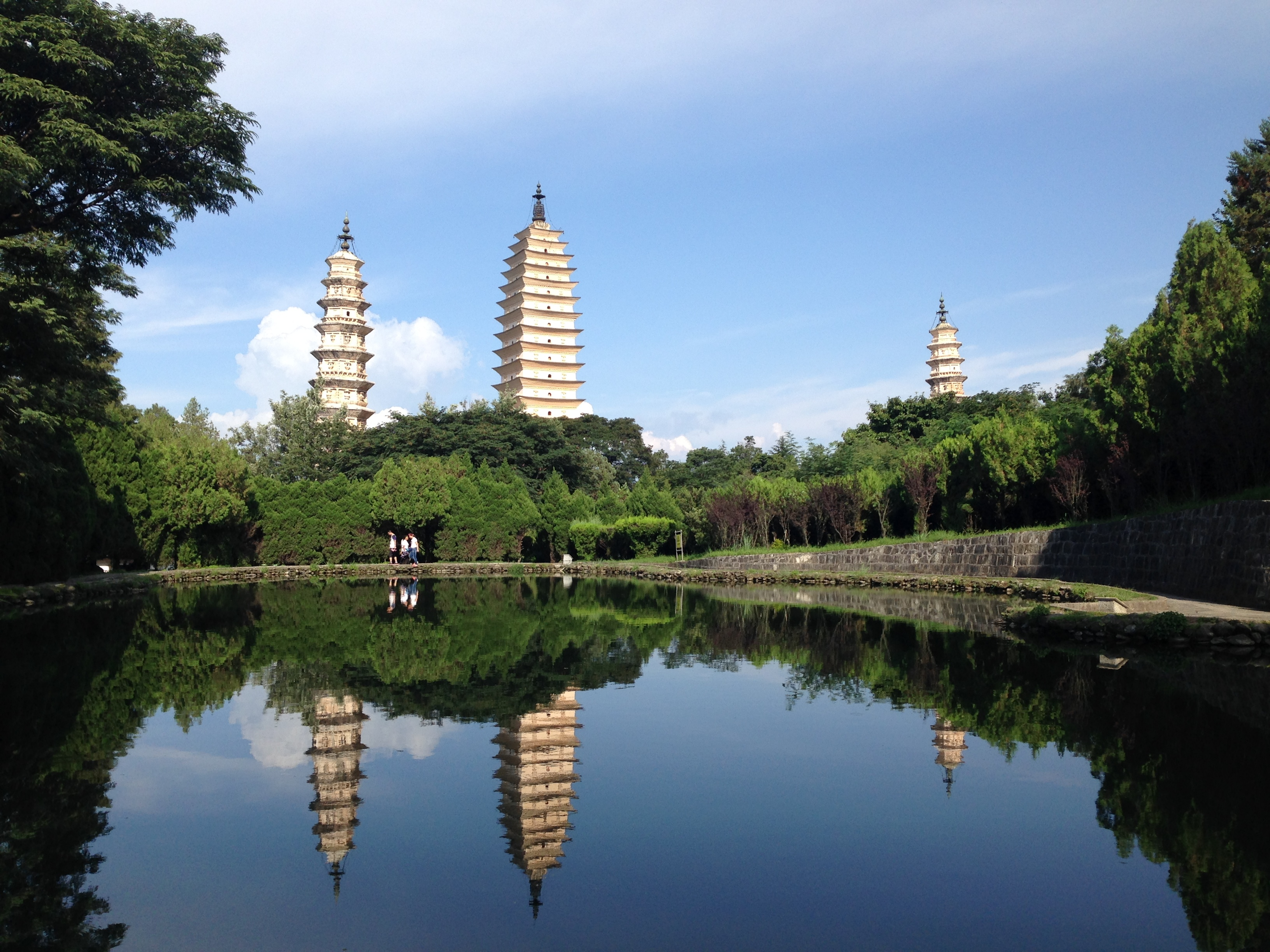
Chongsheng Temple, former royal abbey of Dali Kingdom

In 1094, the former prime minister Gao Shengtai forced King Duan Zhengming to relinquish the throne to him and renamed the Dali Kingdom to "Dazhong Kingdom". Gao Shengtai ruled briefly until his death in 1096, after which the throne was returned to the Duan family. Duan Zhengming's younger brother, Duan Zhengchun, became the new ruler and restored the kingdom's former name. Despite the restoration of the Dali Kingdom, the Gao clan remained in positions of power at court. Their authority was of such significance that later history texts written in the Yuan dynasty and Ming dynasty alluded to the status of the Dali ruler as a mere puppet figure to the Gao officials. According to the History of Yuan, two Gao brothers named Gao Xiang and Gao He were in charge of all state affairs. The Nanzhao yeshi written after the 15th century stated that after the death of Gao Shengtai, the kings of Dali were rulers in name only. The Gao family was responsible for building temples on several scenic mountains and contributing to the state proselytisation effort. An undated stele at Zixi Mountain in Chuxiong praises a man named Gao Liangcheng for constructing monasteries, for which he was rewarded the title of "Dharma-Protecting Bright Duke" by the Duan monarch.

The Gaos later fought amongst themselves for the position of Minister of State. The Gaos split into two warring branches, the Yucheng branch composed of the descendants of Gao Taiming located in the west, and the Guanyin branch descended from Gao Guanyin located in Shanchan and Baiya in the east. The split occurred during the tenure of Gao Zhisheng (r. 1094-96), the father of Gao Shengtai, who assigned his oldest son Shengtai to reside at Dali while another son Shengxiang was assigned to Shanchan. The post of Minister of State was inherited by the eldest son and was passed down through the Yucheng line from Shengtai to his eldest son Taiming. In 1174, the Guanyin branch deposed the incumbent Yucheng Minister of State and replaced him with a member of their own branch, Gao Zhenming. The two branches fought each other until the mid-1180s.

The Gao of Beisheng claimed descent from Gao Shengtai (高昇泰), who usurped the throne of the Dali kingdom c.1094 for approximately one year. According to the Yuan History, Gao Zhisheng (高智升) sent his grandson, Gao Dahui (高大惠), to administer the area after the fall of the Nanzhao kingdom. The Gao served as the Native Officials of Beisheng sub-prefecture for eleven generations during the Ming dynasty. The Ming appointed the first Gao Ce (高策) in recognition of his meritorious military service in 1389, and the eleventh Gao Shichang (高世昌) inherited the position of Vice Magistrate of rank four in 1630.

— Huang Caiwen

=== Intervention in Đại Việt ===
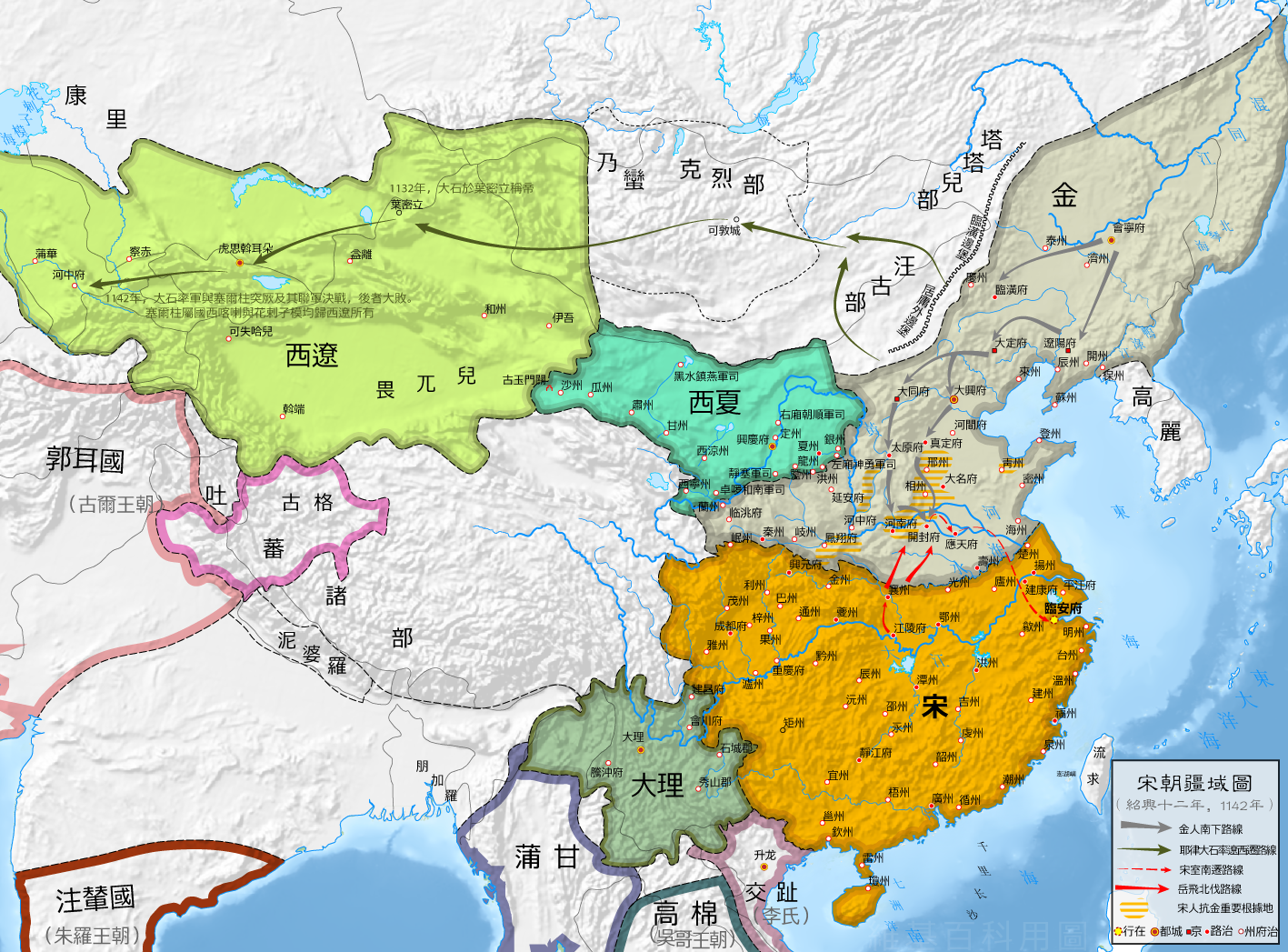
China in AD 1142: Southern Song Jin dynasty Western Xia Western Liao (also known as Qara Khitai) Dali

According to a Vietnamese stone inscription, in 1096 a Dali magician was said to have plotted a conspiracy to murder King Lý Nhân Tông. After the death of Nhân Tông in 1127, his adopted son (by concubine) named Zhizhi had escaped to Dali, changed his surname to Zhao, and assumed the title pingwang (peaceful king). When he learned that his older brother, King Lý Thần Tông, had died in 1137, Zhizhi returned to Đại Việt and attacked Lý Anh Tông with 3,000 Dali troops. However, he was defeated and executed.

=== Duan Zhixing (1172/73-1200) ===
Duan Zhixing commissioned Zhang Shengwen to create a Buddhist scroll depicting rulers, buddhas, bodhisattvas, and dharma guardians. Zhixing took the title of the "Lizhen Emperor" (利貞皇帝) later on. In 1180, a Dali monk named Miaoguan declared Zhixing's reign as having marked the emergence of a Buddha intent on saving sentient beings through painstaking effort. This may have been a reference by efforts by Zhixing to quell unrest in the state by mobilizing the Gao ministers of state and propagating the worship of Maitreya. The Chongsheng Temple probably served as the center of Zhixing's propagation of state Buddhism. Zhixing sponsored the construction of 16 temples in 1190.

=== Fall ===
Möngke Khan sent envoys requesting the surrender of Dali. The king of Dali murdered the envoys and when Möngke received word of this, he placed his brother Kublai in charge of invading Dali.

Kublai split his army into three columns. The western column was led by Uriyangkhadai, who was the son of Subutai, and he was instructed to march from Lintao through Kham into Dali. Wang Dezhen led the eastern column through Sichuan. Wang's column rejoined Kublai's middle column at Jianchang in southern Sichuan. Kublai planned to engage Dali's main army at the Jinsha River, leaving Dali vulnerable to Uriyangkhadai's forces to the northwest. After several skirmishes where Dali forces turned back Mongol raids across the Jinsha River, Kublai's army crossed the river during the night and routed the Dali army. In late 1253, the three columns converged on the city of Dali.

The king of Dali, Duan Xingzhi, fled to the town of Shanchan (near modern Kunming) and rallied pro-Dali forces to oppose the Mongol invasion. It took another two years of fighting before the Mongols captured the cities of Dali and Shanchan. However the resistance against the Mongols continued to the east of Shanchan with the assistance of the Yi kingdoms and the Song dynasty.

In 1256, Duan Xingzhi surrendered and presented to Möngke maps of Yunnan. Duan Xingzhi of Dali was enfeoffed as Maharaja (摩诃罗嵯), and the Duan imperial family continued to hold the title of Maharaja in Yunnan as vassals to the Mongols under the supervision of Borjigin imperial princes and Muslim governors. The Duan family reigned in Dali while the governors served in Kunming. After the Ming conquest of Yunnan, the members of the Duan clan were scattered in various distant areas of China by the Hongwu Emperor.

=== Yunnan under the Yuan dynasty ===
==== Resistance ====
Uriyangkhadai remained in Yunnan to oversee Duan's rule of Dali and to push further east into the Song dynasty. By mid-1256, 20 military brigades had been established throughout Dali and military units had been sent to attack Ziqi. Mongols and Central Asians filled brigade commander positions while members of the local elite staffed the subbrigade battalions. Uriyangkhadai rewarded locals who had supported the Mongol invasion and created a new elite to rival the old pro-Dali elite.

In late 1256, Uriyangkhadai forced the local collaborators in Shanchan to attack the Yi kingdoms in eastern Yunnan and western Guizhou. Those who refused were killed. The Song supported the Yi kingdoms by sending them 10,000 taels of silver and instructing them to defending Ziqi. The Song backed forces invaded the Shanchan region in support of an anti-Mongol rebellion led by Sheliwei. At the same time, Uriyangkhadai was called away to invade Đại Việt under the Trần dynasty. Fierce fighting continued between the Mongol-Dali forces and the Shanchan resistance until Sheliwei was killed in a Mongol ambush in 1274.

The Duan family governed Yunnan's various indigenous peoples for eleven generations until the end of Mongol rule. They willingly contributed soldiers to the Mongol campaign against the Song dynasty. In 1271, they aided the Yuan dynasty in putting down a Mongol rebellion in Yunnan.

==== Ajall Shams al-Din Omar ====
In 1274, Ajall Shams al-Din Omar was assigned by Kublai to stabilize Yunnan. He repaired the road connecting Dali and Shanchan and a network of 78 postal relay stations was established from Dali to the town of Shicheng (modern Qujing). Instead of the military brigades established by Uriyangkhadai, Sayyid' Ajall established political units similar to those in China with circuits, routes, prefectures, and counties. The Yunnan Branch Secretariat was divided into ten circuits, each headed by a pacification commissioner (xuanwei shi). Prefectures and counties were governed by a route commander. Directives by each administrative unit was cosigned by a darughachi and a civilian official.

He instituted a native chieftain system that came to be known as tusi which assigned ranks and posts to native chieftains. Under this institution of "rule based on native customs" the locals retained much of their autonomy with the exception of three obligations. One, they would provide surrendered troops to the Yuan government. Two, local chieftains would provide tribute to the Yuan court. Three, they would follow the rules of appointment, succession, promotion, degradation, reward, and punishment of native chieftains created by the Yuan court.

In the Shanchan region of central Yunnan, Sayyid' Ajall created eight routes: Zhongqing, Dengjiang, Lingan, Yuanjiang, Guangxi, Qujing, Wuding, and Weichu. They were ruled by a new post, the tuguan (native official). The tuguan were official representatives of the Yuan dynasty but retained much autonomy, including the right of passing their hereditary post to their offspring, and autonomy to govern so long as they did not harbour criminals or behave in an anti-Yuan manner. The tuguan were obligated to pay taxes in the form of horses, precious metals, and finished goods. They also had to provide military support when requested. The Yi kingdoms to the east were assigned the same posts and given similar terms.

The tuguan were given a certificate of appointment (gaochi) that was publicly displayed at the tuguan's administrative headquarters. They were also given a seal (yinzheng) to issue orders as representatives of the Yuan state. A tiger tally was granted to authorize maintenance of horses for military mattes. Gold and silver tallies were issued to mobilize military resources.

Sayyid 'Ajall introduced new agricultural techniques and published handbooks in the region. In Shanchan, he oversaw hydraulic projects such as dam and reservoir construction, river and canal dredging for transportation purposes, and draining swamps for land reclamation. He established 55 schools in Yunnan based on a Chinese curriculum and hired Han Chinese instructors to staff them. However most of them were defunct by the beginning of the 14th century. Farming households and garrisons were set up as far south as Dechang to expand agricultural production and to maintain the highway and its postal stations for the government.

Yuan rule also introduced a significant Muslim influence into Yunnan.

==== Duan under Yuan dynasty ====
The 10th Governor-General of Dali Duan Gong was married to the Mongol Borjigin Princess Agai, daughter of the Yuan dynasty Prince of Liang, Basalawarmi. They had a son and a daughter, Duan Sengnu. their children were also called Duan Qiangna and Duan Bao. However the Mongols feared the power of Duan Gong and killed him. Duan Sengnu raised Duan Bao to take revenge against Basalawarmi for the killing of Duan Gong. A play was made based on these events. According to Yuan documents, the Duan family were originally ethnic Han from Wuwei commandery, Gansu. Other Duan families also originated from Wuwei.

=== Conquest of Yunnan by the Ming dynasty ===
In 1381, the Ming dynasty dispatched 300,000 troops to crush the Yuan remnants in Yunnan.

The Duan clan, who helped the Yuan dynasty against a Red Turban Rebellion attack from Sichuan, also fought against the Ming army. Duan Shi, the 13th and the last hereditary Governor-General of Dali, refused to surrender by writing to Fu Youde, making it clear that Dali could only be a tributary to the Ming. In 1382 Lan Yu and Mu Ying's forces attacked and crushed Duan's realm after a fierce battle. The Duan family were then taken captive and escorted to the Ming capital of Nanjing.

== Government ==
The administration of the Dali Kingdom has been characterized as a mandala state similar to Southeast Asian kingdoms with some Chinese influence. The Duan rulers bestowed Sinitic-style official appointments upon clans such as the Gao, Yang, and Dong to incorporate them into the mandala's center while subordinating peripheral ethnic groups by establishing alliances with their leaders. The Dali court granted hereditary fiefs to pre-existing clan chiefs, in particular the Duan, Gao, Yang, and Dong clans, to win over their support. Some administrative units were designated semi-autonomous military divisions. Similarly to the Nanzhao military, the Dali military consisted of a standing army, townsfolk peasant-soldiers and indigenous militia. Sometimes the clans and alliances fractured, resulting in rebellions. Thirty-seven tribes in northeast Yunnan had been allied with the Duan rulers since 971 but revolted early in Duan Zhengyan's (r. 1117-41) reign. In 1147, rebel activity in Shanchan caused the death of a Gao official. In 1150, rebellions broke out in Yongchang and Tengchong in the southwest. Both areas were governed by Gao officials. After that, the Gao clan fought among themselves in the capital region in the 1170s.

The kings of Dali styled themselves as Buddha-kings in a similar manner to classical Southeast Asian kingdoms and used titles such as dharmaraja (護法法王/法王), or "righteous ruler".

The rulers of Dali continued the traditions of Nanzhao, such as the royal title piaoxin (Lord of Pyu), the use of the same tall crowns, and taking Acuoye Guanyin as their tutelary deity. They also used the title emperor (huangdi).

== Language and ethnicity ==
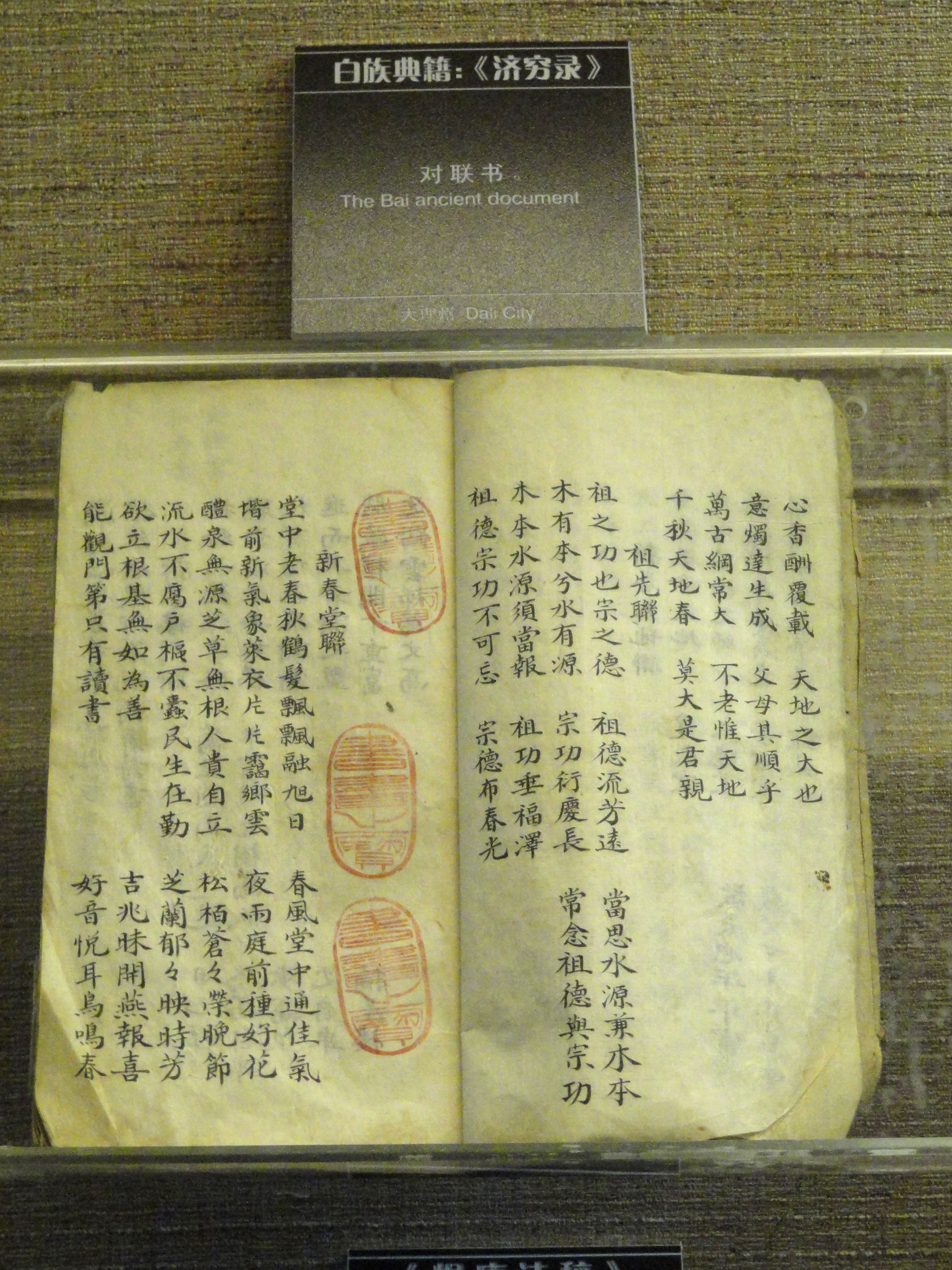
A Bai manuscript written in Classical Chinese.

Extant sources from Nanzhao and the Dali Kingdom show that the ruling elite used Chinese script. Under the influence of Chinese officials present from early times, the Dali elite adopted Chinese script supplemented by Bai characters, which were also based on Chinese characters. As a result, the vast majority of Dali sources are written in Classical Chinese. Even though the ruling elite also used Bai language for communication, no attempt was made to standardize or popularize the script, and it remained an unofficial writing system.

Today, most Bai people trace their ancestry to Nanzhao and the Dali Kingdom, but records from those kingdoms do not mention the Bai. The earliest references to "Bai people", or the "Bo", are from the Yuan dynasty. During the Ming dynasty, the Bai were also known as "Minjia" (civilians). A Bai script using Chinese characters was mentioned during the Ming dynasty.

According to Stevan Harrell, while the ethnic identity of Nanzhao's ruling elite is still disputed, the subsequent Yang and Duan dynasties were both definitely Bai.

== Religion ==
A version of Buddhism known as Azhali existed in Yunnan since the 9th century. The last king of Nanzhao established Buddhism as the state religion and many Dali kings continued the tradition. Ten of Dali's 22 kings retired to become Buddhist monks. An 1186 stele documenting the renovation of Xingbao Temple, which was established in 860 but had fallen into ruin, showed influence from both Buddhism and Confucianism in the language used. A high-ranking position known as "Monk Confucian" existed, suggesting a melding of Buddhist and Confucian teachings into a hybrid ideology.

Fan Chengda (1126-1193) encountered a Dali trade mission and noted that they sought Chinese literature, medical texts, Buddhist scriptures, and dictionaries in return for horses. He marveled that "these people all possessed proper etiquette, and carried and recited Buddhist scriptural books."

== Family tree of monarchs ==
Family Tree of the Emperors of Dali

Duàn Bǎolóng 段寶龍
Duan Siping 段思平 b. c. 894 – d. c. 944; Taizu 太祖 r. 937–944^{1}	Duan Sizhou 段思胄 (d. 951); Taizong 太宗 (r. 945–951)^{3}
Duan Siying 段思英; Wénjīng huángdì 文經皇帝 r. 944–945^{2}	□	Duan Sicong 段思聰 d. 968; Zhìdàoguǎngcí huángdì 至道廣慈皇帝 r. 952–968^{4}
□	Duan Sushun 段素順 d. 985; Yīngdào huángdì 應道皇帝 r. 968–985^{5}
Duan Zhisi 段智思	Duan Suying 段素英; Zhāomíng huángdì 昭明皇帝 r. 985–1009^{6}
Duan Silian 段思廉; Xīngzōng 興宗 r. 1044–1075^{11}	Duan Sulian 段素廉 d.1022 Xuānsù huángdì 宣肅皇帝 r. 1009–1022^{7}	□
Duan Lianshou 段廉寿	Duan Lianyi 段廉義 d. 1080; Xìngzōng 興宗 r. 1075–1080^{12}	Duan Lianzheng 段廉正	Duan Suzhen 段素真; Shèngdé huángdì 聖德皇帝 r. 1026–1041^{9}	Duan Sulong 段素隆; Bǐngyì huángdì 秉義皇帝 r. 1022–1026^{8}
Duan Shouhui 段壽輝; Shàngmíng huángdì 上明皇帝 r. 1080–1081^{13}	Duan Zhengming 段正明; Bǎodìng huángdì 保定皇帝 r.1081–1094^{14}	Duan Zhengchun 段正淳; Zhongzong 中宗 r. 1096–1108^{15}	□
Duan Heyu 段和譽; Xianzong 憲宗 r. 1108–1147^{16}	Duan Suxing 段素興; Tiānmíng huángdì 天明皇帝 r. 1041–1044^{10}
Duan Zhengxing 段正興 r. 1147–1171^{17}
Duan Zhixing 段智興; Xuanzong 宣宗 r. 1171–1200^{18}
Duan Zhixiang 段智祥 r. 1204–1238^{20}	Duan Zhilian 段智廉 r. 1200–1204^{19}
Duàn Ziangxing 段祥興; Xiàoyì huángdì 孝義皇帝 r. 1238–1251^{21}
Duan Xingzhi 段興智 r. 1251–1254; 1257–1260^{22}

== Art ==
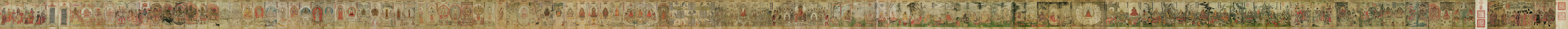
Zhang Shengwen's Kingdom of Dali Buddhist Volume of Paintings. Scroll, Ink and color on paper. 30.4 cm high. Located in the National Palace Museum, Taipei. The entire work is 16.655 meters and is in three portions. Completed in 1176.

== Gallery ==
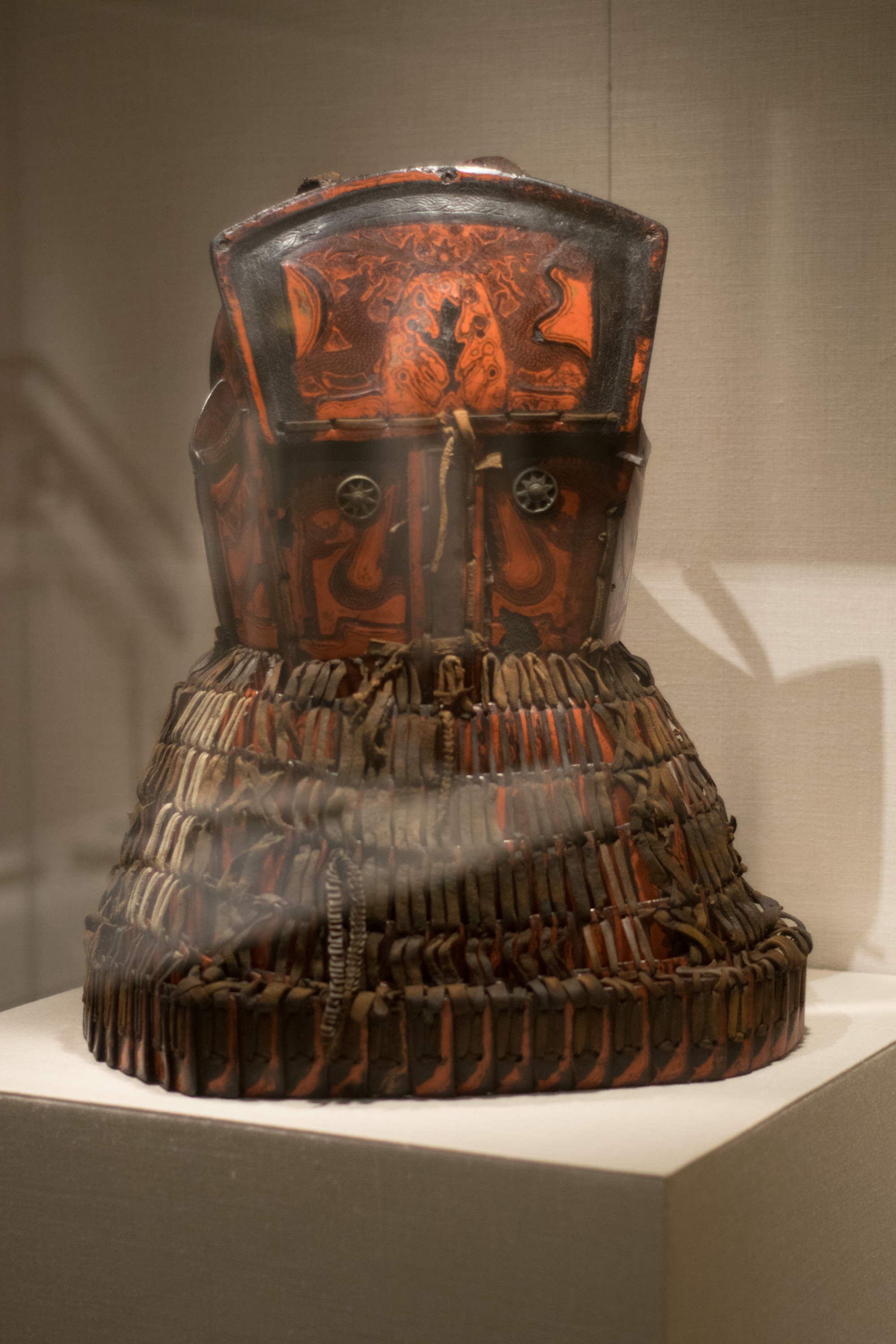
Lacquered armour of the Dali Kingdom

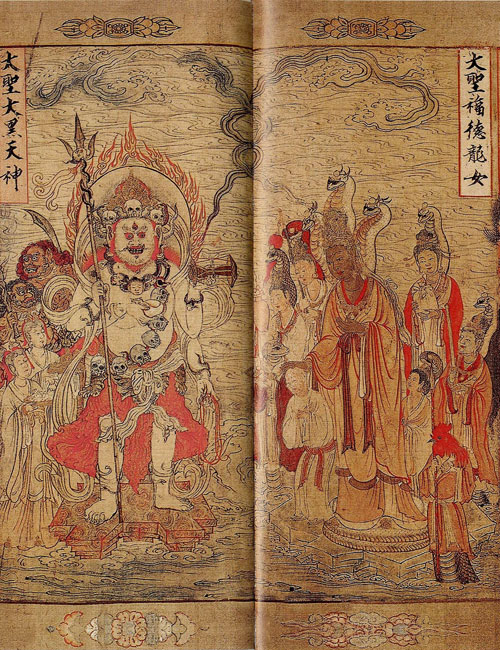
Dali religious painting

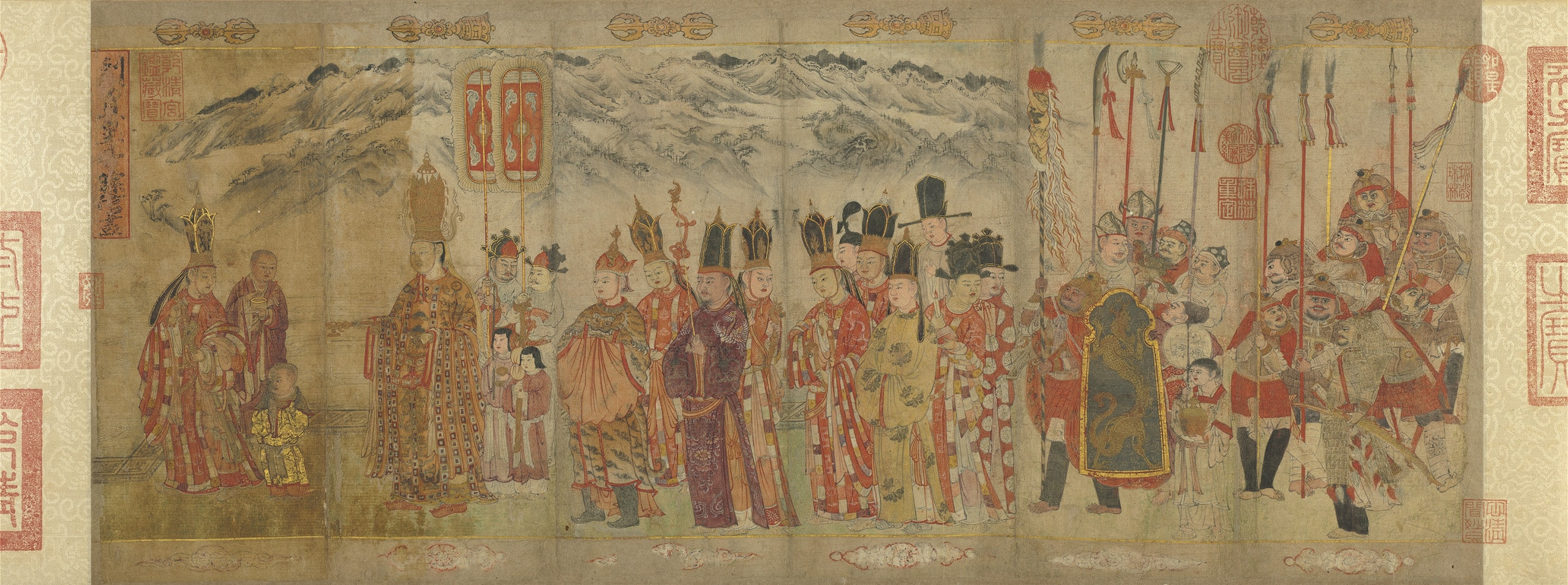
Dali procession of nobles and soldiers

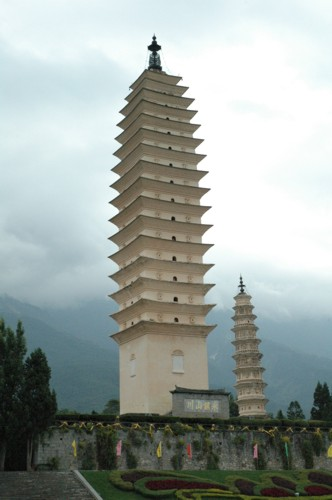
Pagoda of Chongsheng Temple, the royal temple of the Dali

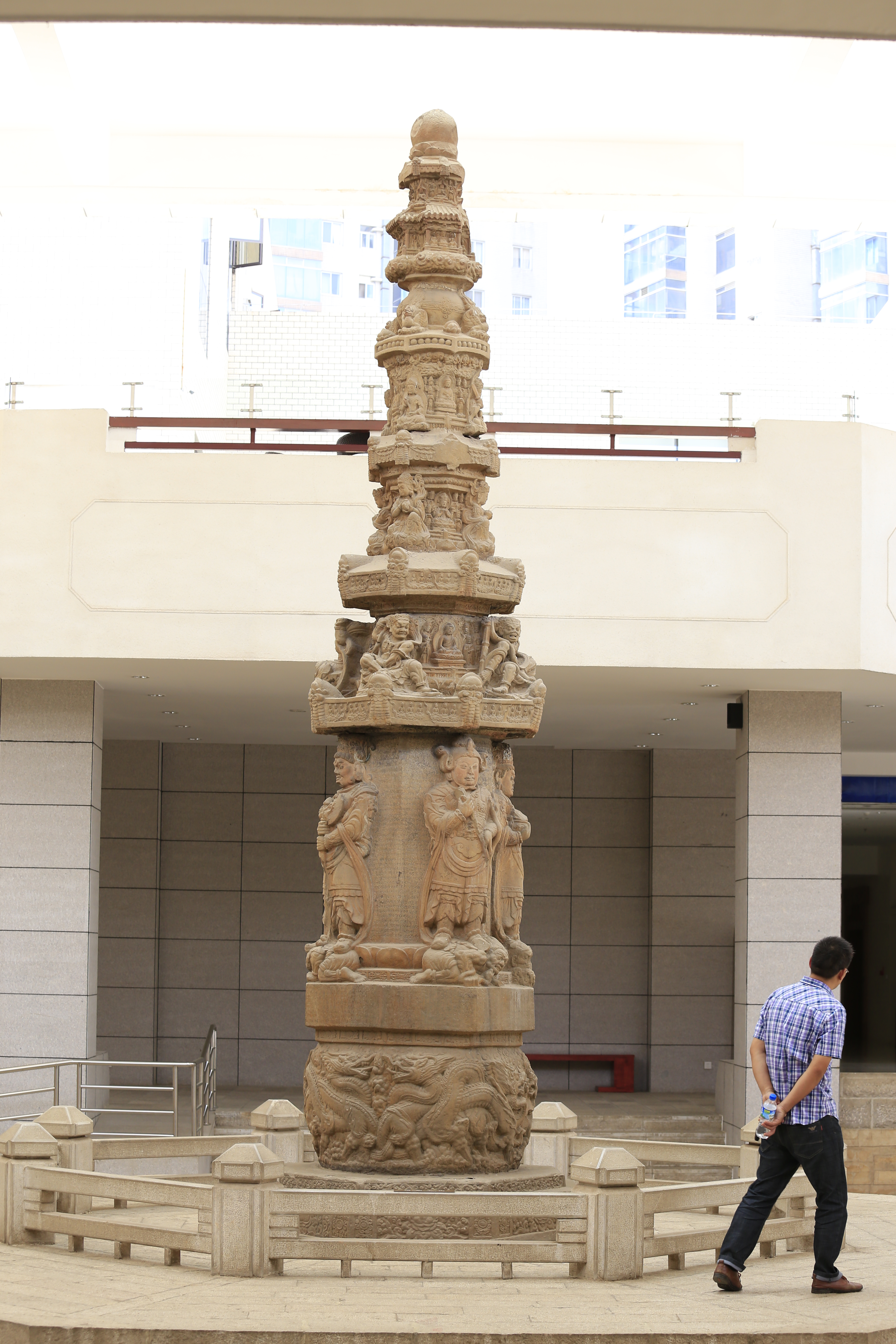
Dharani pillar of Dali, 1220

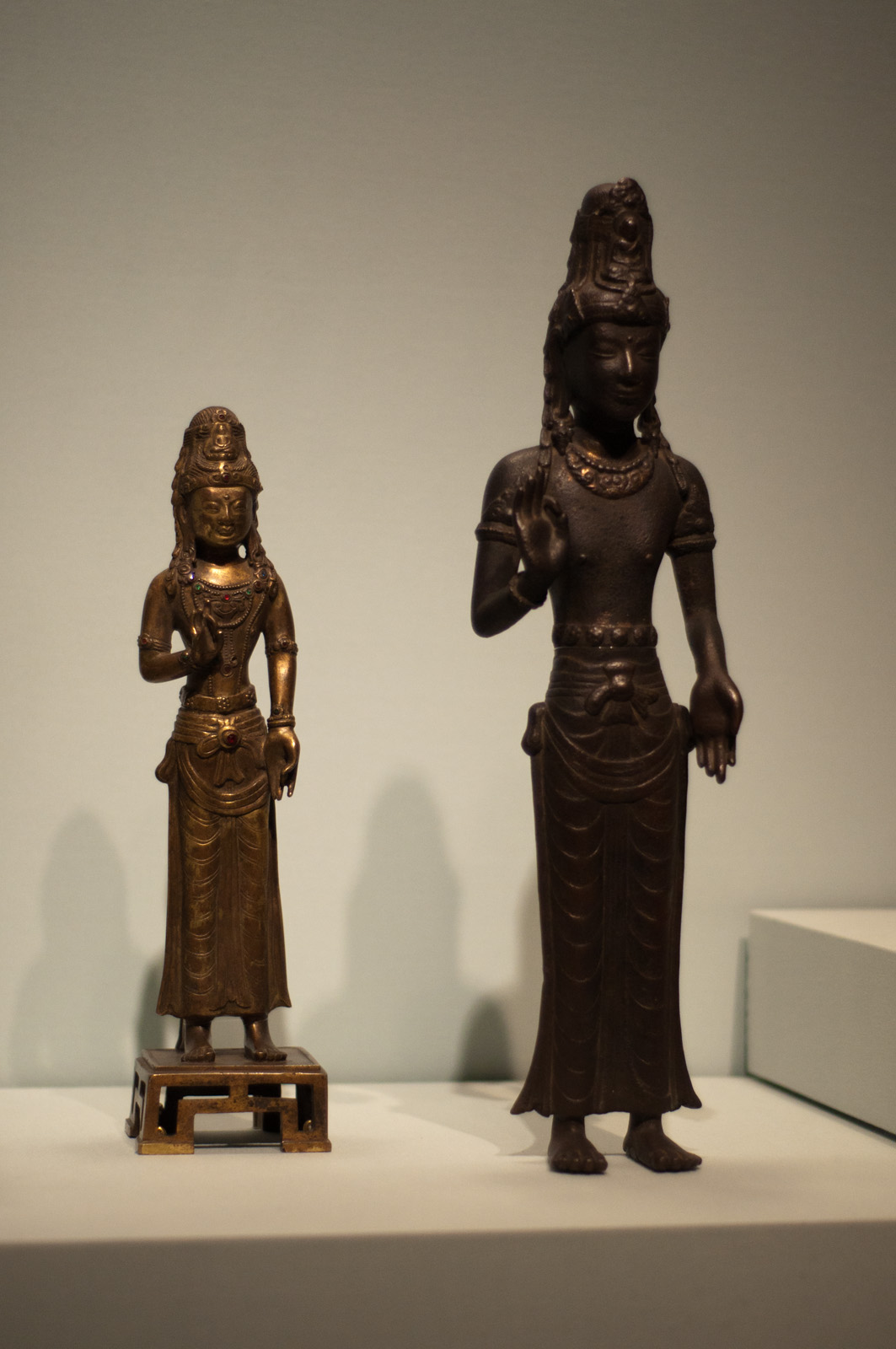
Bronze statue of Guanyin from Dali

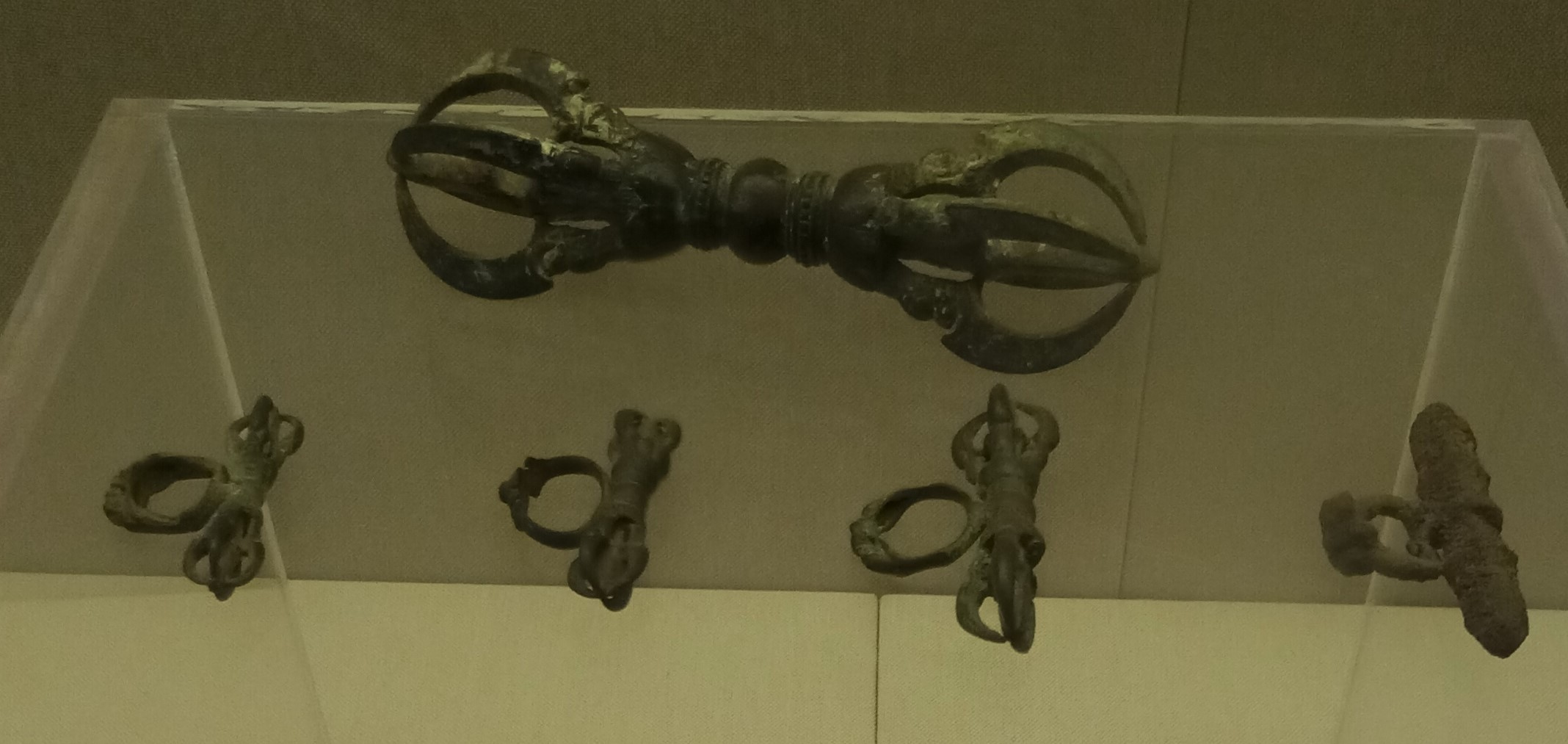
Dali vajra sceptre (jingangchu)

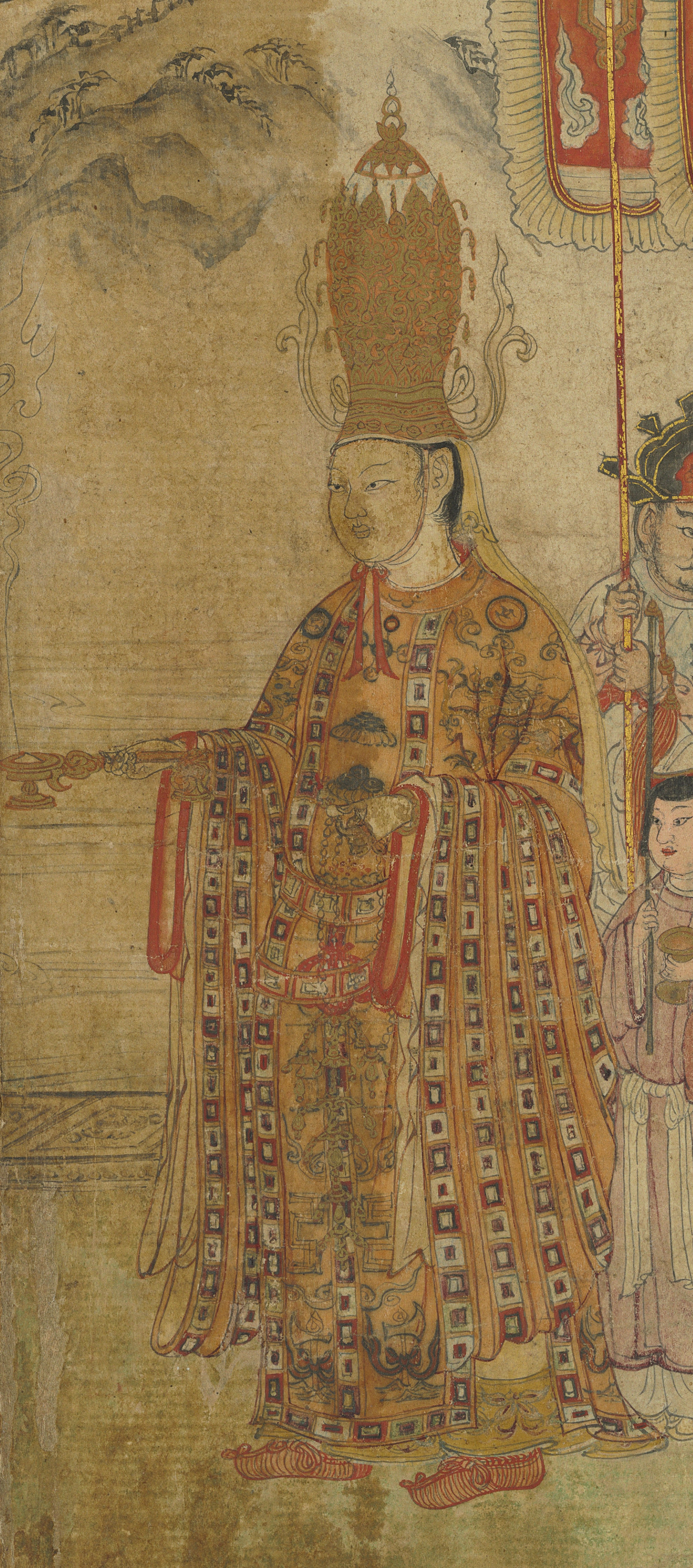
Duan Zhixing (r. 1171–1200)

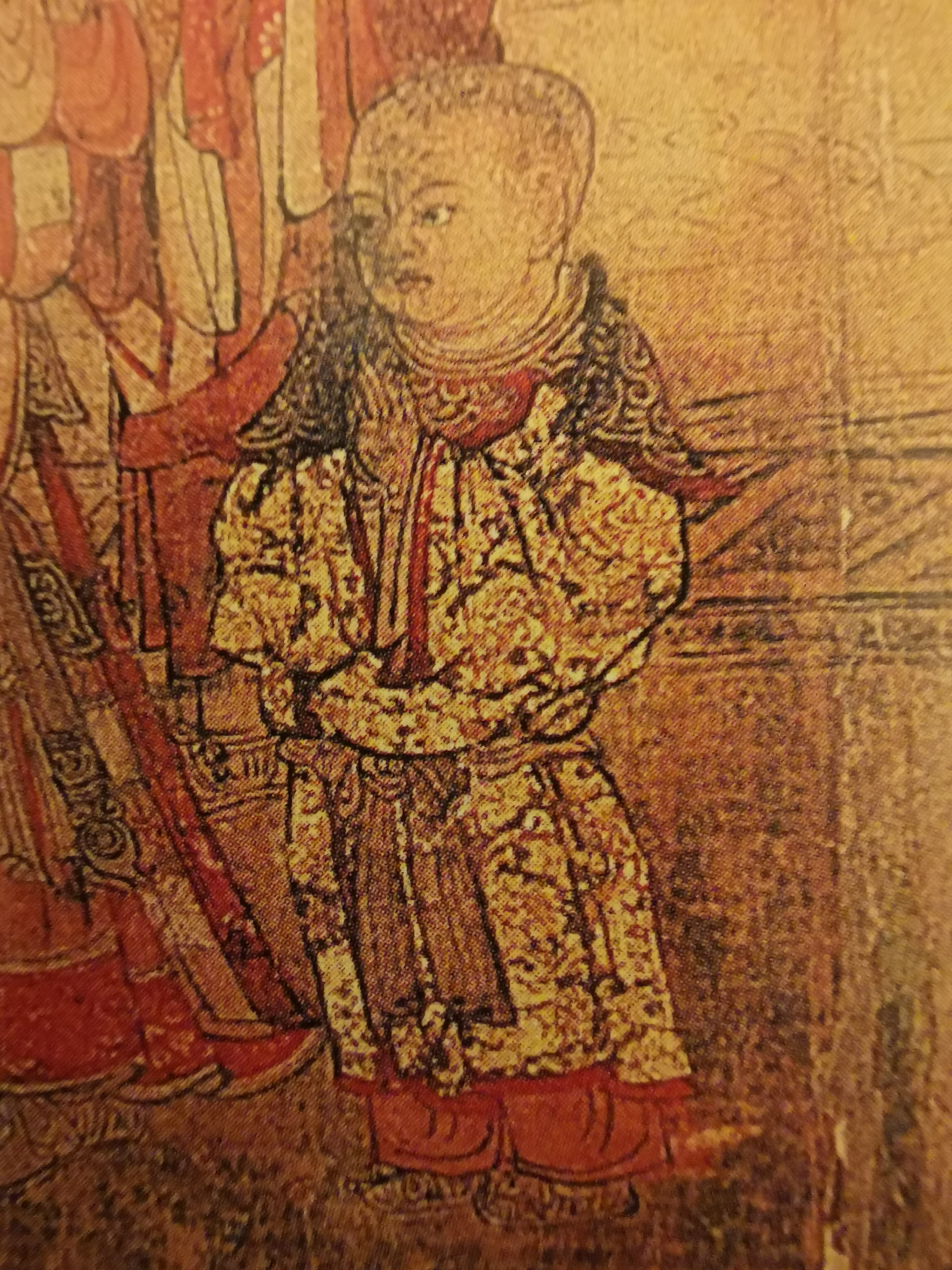

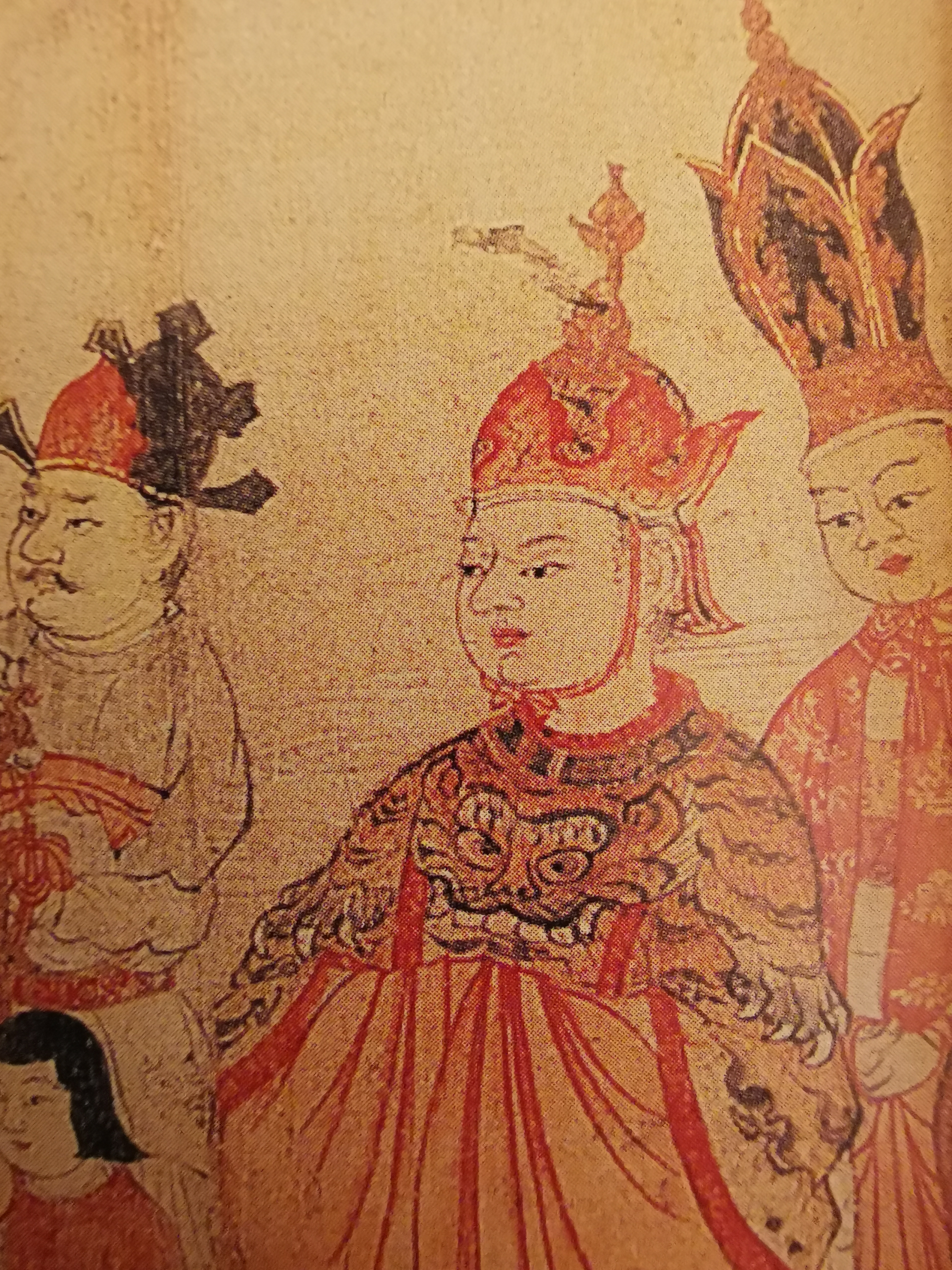

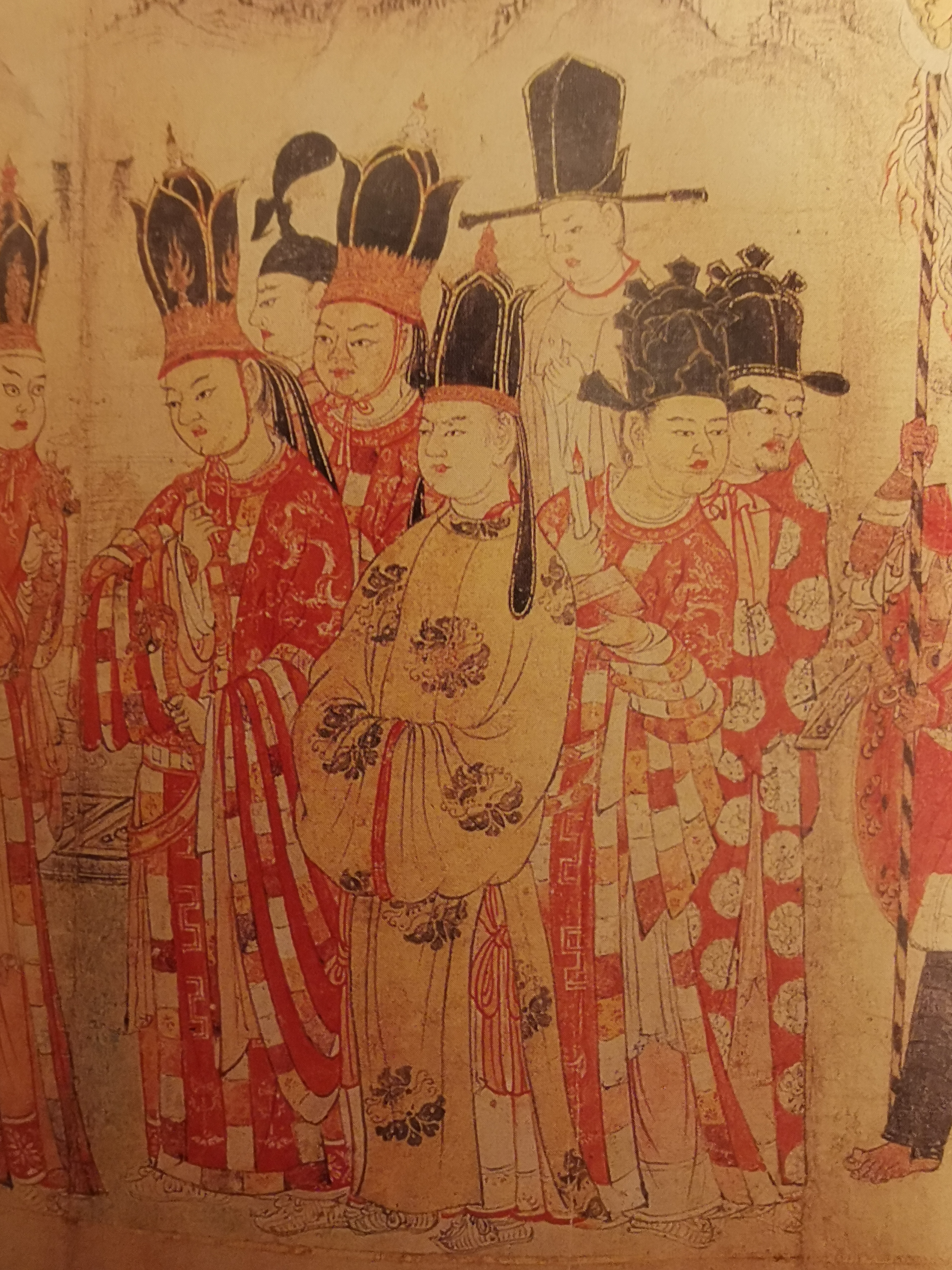

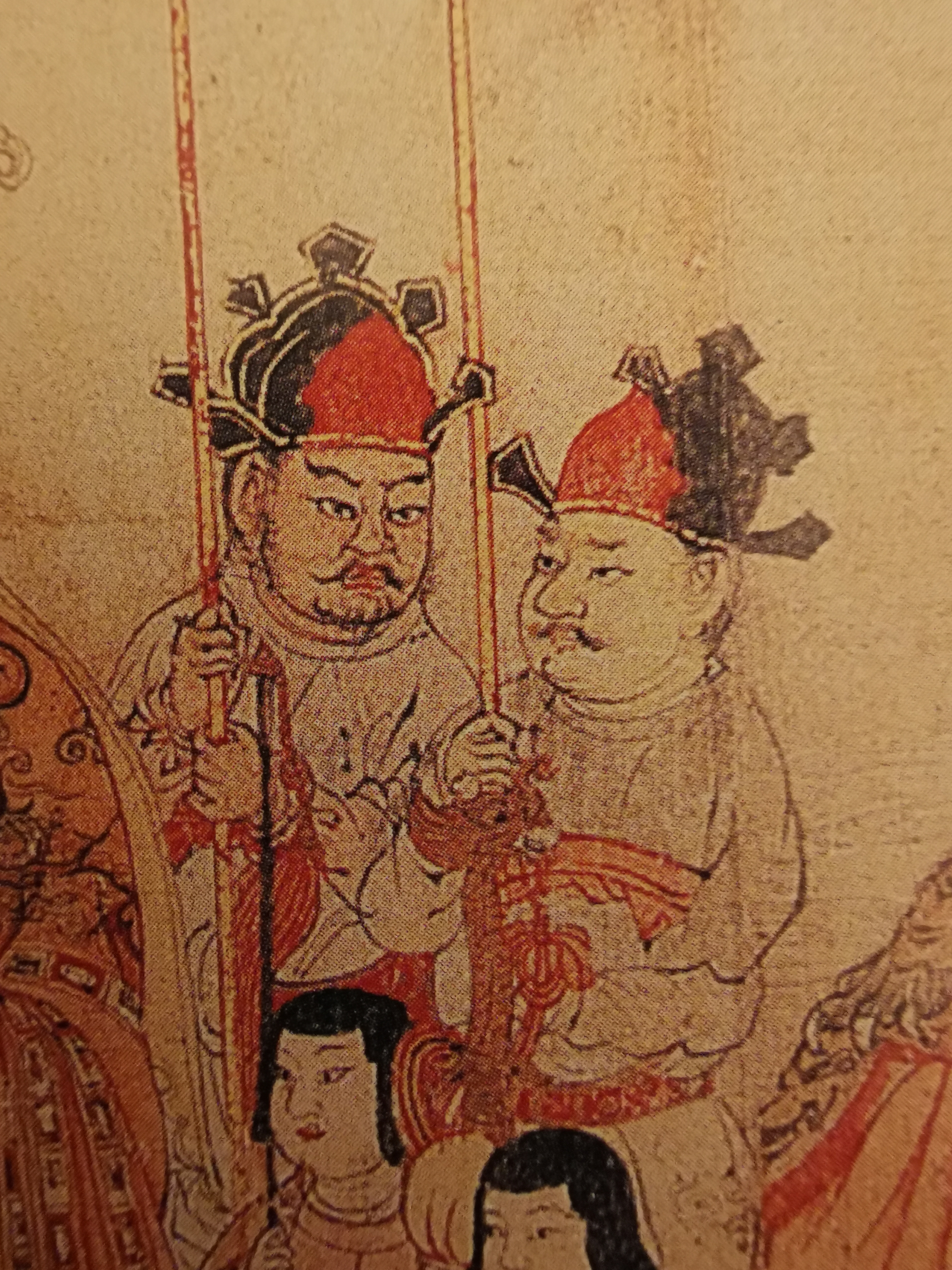
