= Zhang Shengwen =

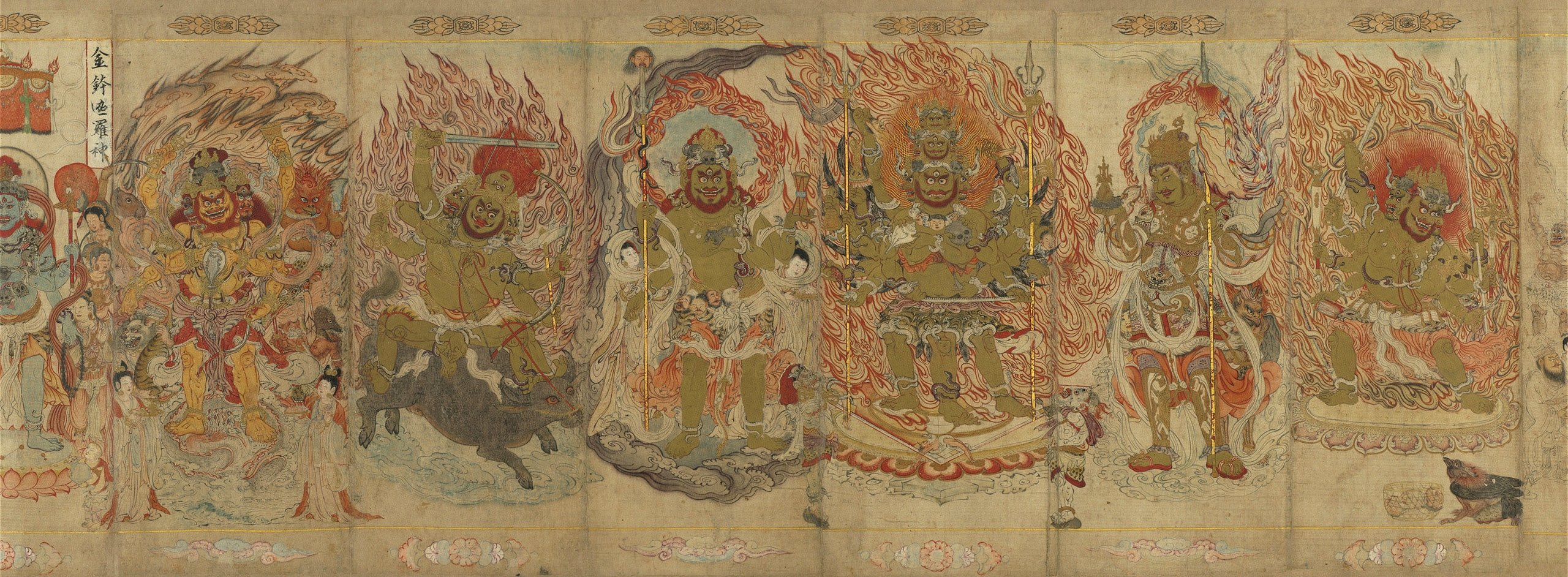
Zhang Shengwen, Kingdom of Dali Buddhist Volume of Paintings (portion), National Palace Museum, Completed by 1180

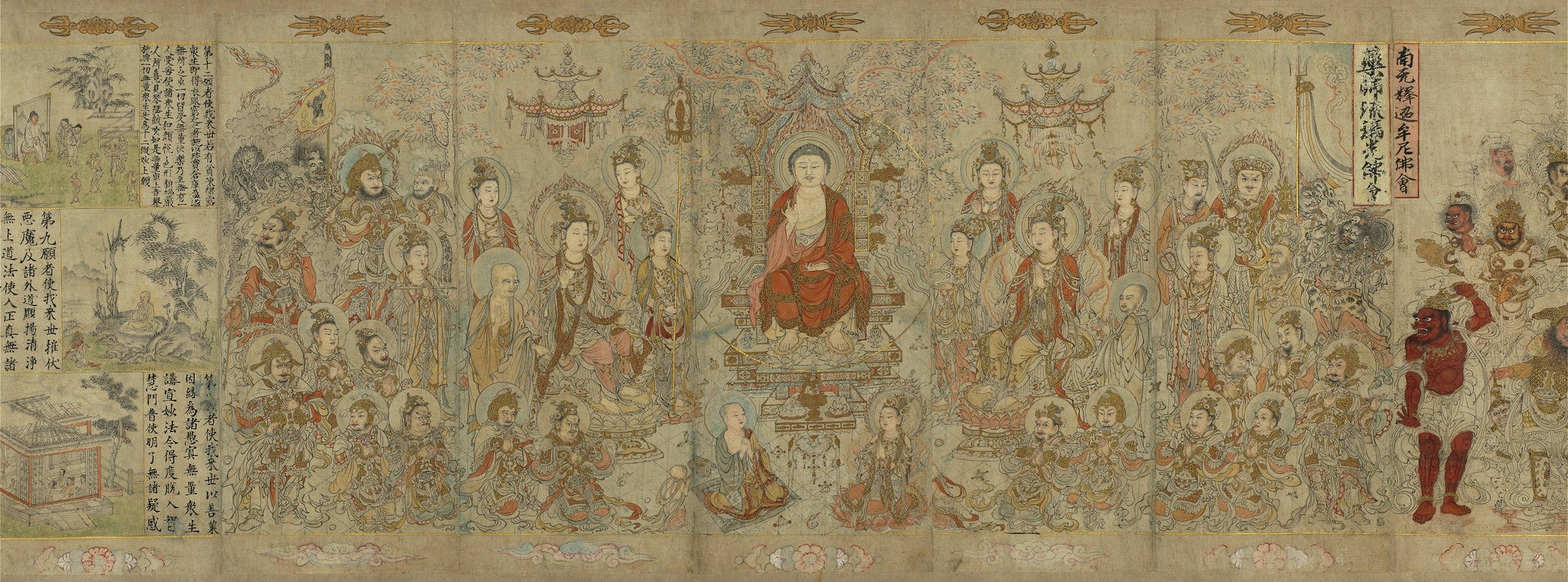
Zhang Shengwen, Kingdom of Dali Buddhist Volume of Paintings (portion)

Zhang Shengwen (simplified Chinese: 张胜温; traditional Chinese: 張勝溫; pinyin: Zhāng Shèngwēn; Wade–Giles: Chang Sheng-wen); (active 1163–1189) was a painter from the Kingdom of Dali (present day Yunnan Province) during the 12th century.

Zhang is known for the Kingdom of Dali Buddhist Volume of Paintings (大理國梵像卷). The entire work is 30.4 cm tall by 16.655 meters long.

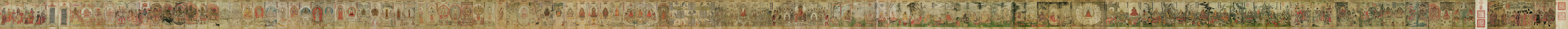
Panorama of Kingdom of Dali Buddhist Volume of Paintings
