= Duan Suying =

Dali monarch (d. 1009)

Emperor Zhaoming of Dali 大理昭明帝

Emperor of Dali
- Reign: 986–1009
- Predecessor: Duan Sushun
- Successor: Duan Sulian
- Born: Unknown
- Died: 1009
Full name
- Family name: Duan (段); Given name: Suying (素英)
Posthumous name
- Emperor Zhaoming (昭明皇帝)
- Dynasty: Dali

Duan Suying (Chinese: 段素英, died 1009), also known by his posthumous name as the Emperor Zhaoming of Dali (大理昭明帝), was the sixth emperor of the Dali Kingdom. His reign lasted from 985 to 1009.

He was a descendant of Duan Siliang and the son of his predecessor Duan Sushun. After his death, he was succeeded by his son Duan Sulian.

He valued Confucianism and initiated the imperial examination system in Dali, likely in 1000. The later claim that he authored a version of the Buddhist work Transmission of the Lamp, while not completely impossible, is considered unlikely.

== Diplomacy ==
In 989 or some time during 991–995, Duan Suying sent a letter to Emperor Taizong of Song pleading the latter to conduct the fengshan ceremony. Duan's letter is now lost, but the reply written by Wang Yucheng on the Song emperor's behalf, which rejected the proposal, has survived as "A Reply to the Nanzhao King's Request for the Eastern Feng Ceremony" (批答南詔國王請東封表). Duan likely sent the messenger to better understand the Chinese emperor.

In 993, an agrarian rebellion led by Wang Xiaobo (王小波) and Li Shun (李順) engulfed the Song Xichuan Circuit (now Sichuan), and the Song huanguan (eunuch) general Wang Ji'en led an army to suppress it. Many Chinese refugees crossed the Jinsha River and entered Dali, and this likely played a major role in Duan Suying's adoption of Confucianism and the imperial examination system. Between 994 and 995, after the Song recovered most of Xichuan, it sent a diplomat named Xin Yixian (辛怡顯) to the Dali capital Yangjumie as part of its counterinsurgency campaign. Xin Yixian later wrote a book titled Records of Yunnan During the Zhidao Period (至道雲南錄; zhidao referring to the years 995–997).

In 996, Duan Suying sent another mission led by Duan Yuanshun (段元順) to the Song capital, where they were "warmly received". In addition, Dali sent tributes to Song in 985, 989, 991, 997, 999, 1005, and 1008.

== Era names ==
Duan Suying used at least five era names:

- Guangming (廣明, 986–988?)
- Mingsheng (明聖, 989?–996)
- Mingzhi (明治, 997–?)
- Mingtong (明統, ?–1005)
- Mingying (明應, 1006–?)

The first year of mingtong was after 1000, and mingying lasted until at least 1007. These era names suggest a prosperous economy and a stable society under him.
