= Ziqi (kingdom) =

Chinese kingdom

Ziqi 自杞
- 1100–1259
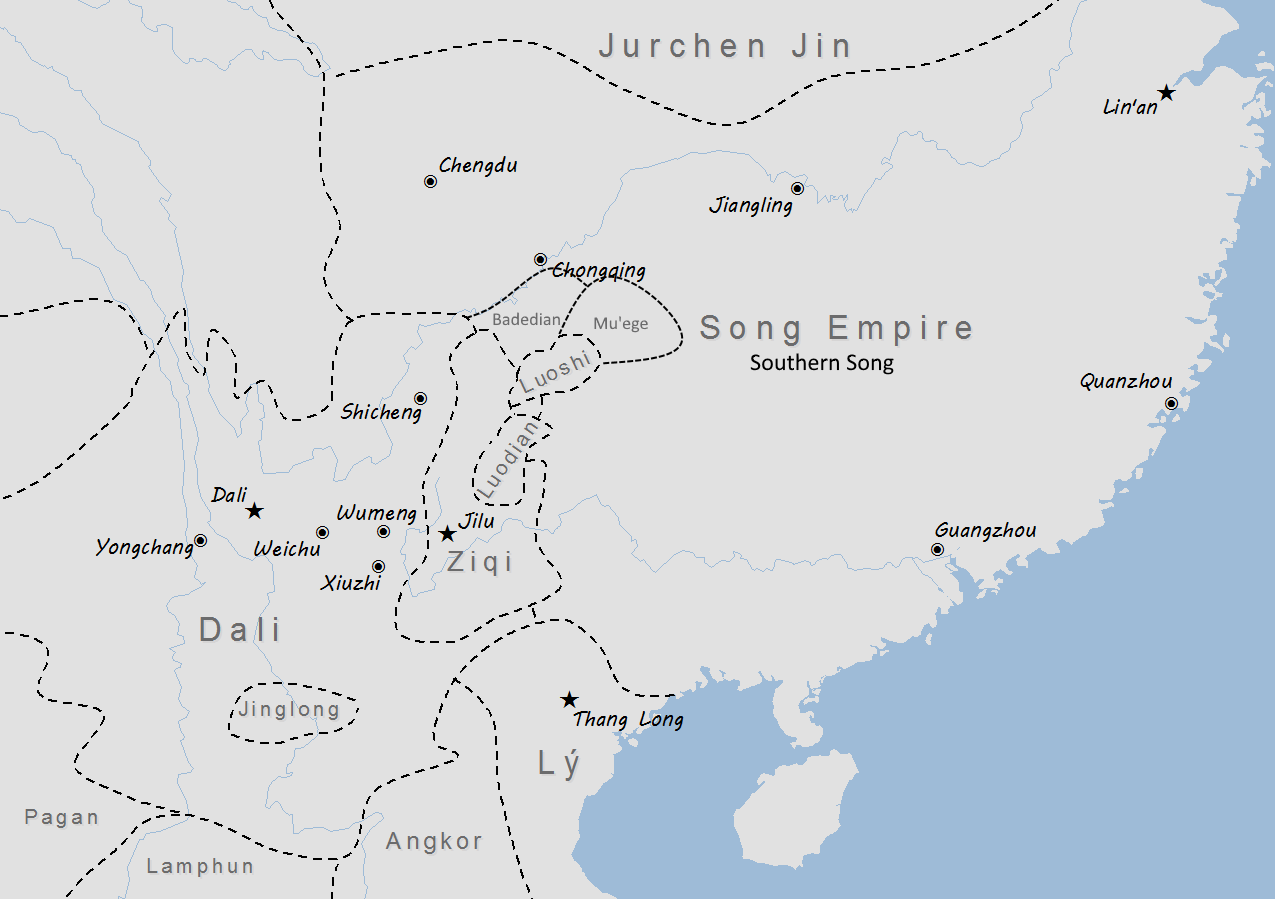
- Ziqi Kingdom in 1200
- Status: Kingdom
- Capital: Jilu (near Luxi)
- Common languages: Nasu language
- Government: Monarchy
- King
  - 1100 - 1136: Ziqi
  - 1136 - 1158: Awei
  - 1158 - 1162: Asi
  - 1176 - 1205: Axie
  - 1205 - 1240: Amo
  - 1240 - 1259: Naju
- Historical era: Postclassical Era
  - Established: 1100
  - Disestablished: 1259
Preceded by	Succeeded by
Dali Kingdom	Mongol Empire
- Today part of: China

Ziqi (simplified Chinese: 自杞国; traditional Chinese: 自杞國; pinyin: Zìqǐguó) was a kingdom established by the Wuman (烏蠻, lit. 'black barbarians', ancestors of Yi people) in southwestern China during the Song dynasty. The territory of Ziqi included parts of modern-day Guizhou, Guangxi and Yunnan provinces of China.

Ziqi was originally one of 37 tribes of the Wuman people in eastern Yunnan. During the Tang dynasty, they were ruled by the Nanzhao Kingdom. The Nanzhao Kingdom collapsed in 937, and Yunnan entered a chaotic transitional period between the Nanzhao and Dali kingdoms. During this time, Wuman tribes split away from Yunnan and moved eastward. Among them, several small kingdoms were established, and Ziqi was the strongest one, gradually defeating others and controlling a large area between Yunnan and the Red River.

At this time, China proper was ruled by the Song dynasty. Ziqi then became one of Song's tributary states. People in the Song dynasty called them Xi Nan Yi (西南夷, "Southwestern Barbarians") along with several other tribes. When Jurchens attacked the Song from the north, Ziqi became an important source of war horses for the Song. During the reign of Axie (1176 - 1205), Ziqi defeated the Dali Kingdom, Luodian and Annan (Lý dynasty) in a series of battles and became the strongest power in southwestern China.

In 1253, the Mongol Empire annexed the Dali Kingdom and started to invade Ziqi. The Mongols found many maps of Ziqi in Dali and planned strategies based on those maps. With reinforcements from the Song, Ziqi fought hard and caused remarkable casualties to the Mongols, but it was eventually conquered by Mongols in 1259. The territory of Ziqi suffered a massacre by the Mongols.

== List of rulers ==
- Ziqi 自杞 (1100 - 1136)
- Awei 阿维 (1136 - 1158)
- Asi 阿巳 (Regent; 1158 - 1162)
- Axie 阿謝 (1176 - 1205)
- Amo 阿摩 (1205 - 1240)
- Naju 郍句 (1240 - 1259)
