= Territory of the Arakan Army =

Quasi-state in Myanmar

- Flag of the AA

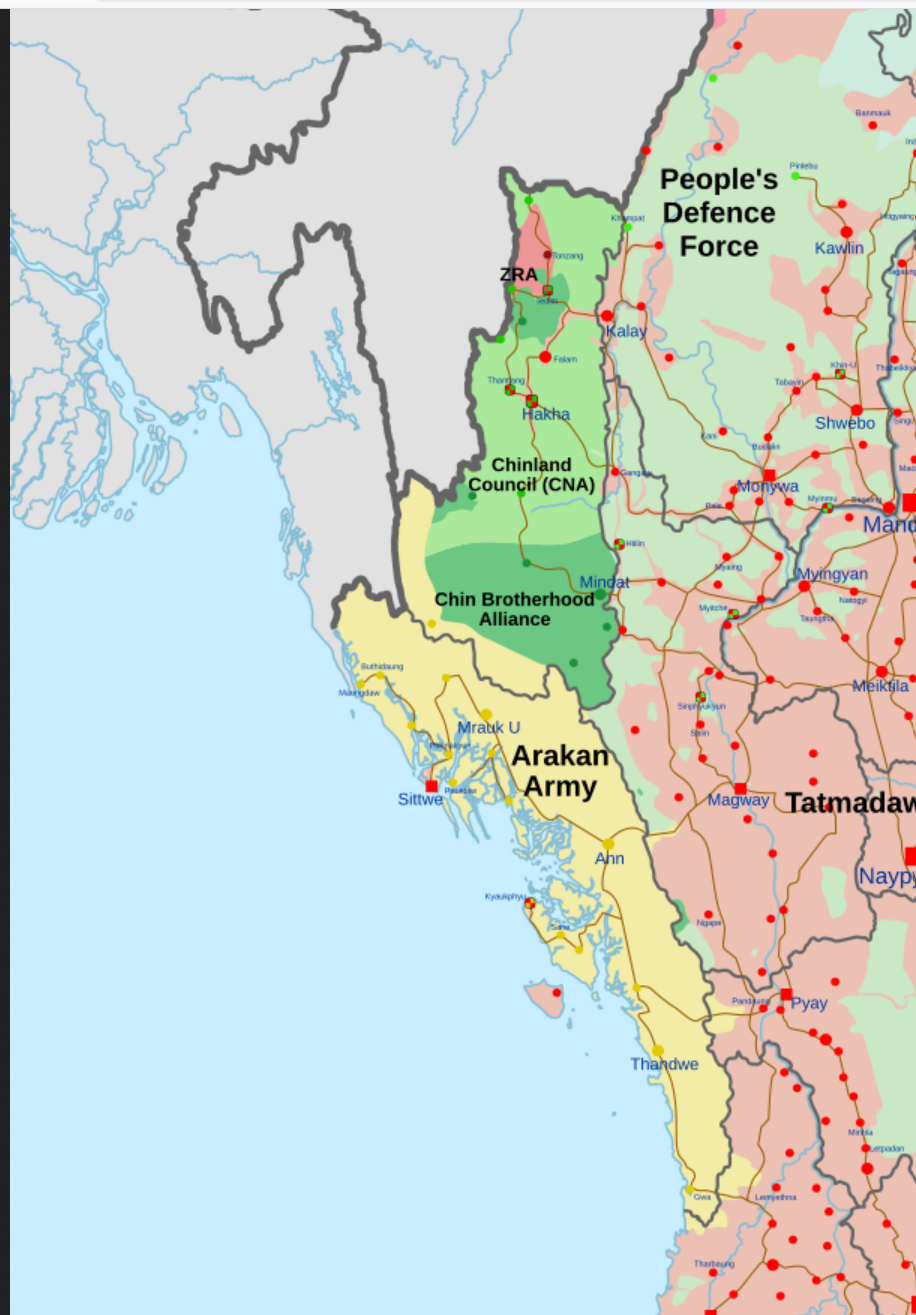
- Territories under Arakan Army as of August 2026
- Status: Quasi-state and Rival government
- Official languages: Arakanese
- Government: Civil administration (APRG)
  - Commander-in-Chief of the AA and Chairman of the ULA: Twan Mrat Naing
  - Vice Commander-in-Chief of the AA and Vice Chairman of the ULA: Nyo Twan Awng
  - Spokesperson of the AA and ULA: Khaing Thu Kha
  - Secretary General of the ULA: Twan Morn Naing
- History
  - Established: 2015

The Territory of the Arakan Army refers to the areas controlled and administered by the Arakan Army, a rebel group based in Rakhine State, Myanmar. Between 2023 and 2024, the group significantly gained control of 90% of the territories in Rakhine State during the Rakhine offensive in Myanmar civil war (2021–present).

== Background ==
Arakan, officially known as Rakhine State, is located along the eastern coast of the Bay of Bengal in western Myanmar. Since the Myanmar Civil War, which escalated due to the coup d'état in 2021, the AA has launched offensives to capture the entire Rakhine State under its control. Rakhine State has experienced long political, social, and economic challenges. Since 2017, the region has received international attention because of the Rohingya crisis and the growing influence of Arakan Army (AA).

On 10 April 2009, the Arakan Army was founded with its temporary headquarters in Laiza, Kachin State, which was at the time and currently is under the control of the Kachin Independence Army.

The political objective of the AA is to establish an "Arakan Nation" through the "Way of Rakhita", an ideology in restoring sovereignty to the people of Arakan. The AA began its conflict with the military in northern Rakhine State in 2015. Fighting intensified in late 2018 and continued until the first week of November 2020, three months before the military coup. Major-General Twan Mrat Naing, the leader of the AA, has stated his preference for a "confederation status" for the region.

== Territorial development ==
The Arakan Army has begun its offensive on November 13, 2023. Seventeen days after the launch of Operation 1027 by the Northern Brotherhood Alliance, the AA began its own counter-offensive.

After the February 2021 coup, the Arakan Army discouraged residents of Rakhine State from joining the nationwide anti-regime movement, instead, it expanded its armed capabilities. Since November 2023, the AA has launched attacks on military positions in Rakhine State. It quickly took control of dozens of military, police, and Border Guard Police outposts in northern Rakhine. However, it also faced early setbacks, including a withdrawal from Pauktaw town shortly after claiming control. Between early 2024 and the end of the year, the townships Kyauktaw, Rathedaung, Mrauk-U, Minbya, Myebon, Pauktaw, and Ponnagyun fell under the AA.

As of late 2024, the AA has reportedly taken control of 15 townships (Note: The AA has captured 14 out of 17 townships in Rakhine State. Additionally, it has captured the Paletwa Township of Chin State, totaling 15 townships under its control.) and held control over more than 90% of Rakhine territory. After advancing across Rakhine, it has also spread into southern Chin, Magway, Bago, and Ayeyarwady regions.

Since mid-2025, the armed group has claimed control of the following townships:

Township	Date Captured
Paletwa	14 Jan 2024
Pauktaw	19 Jan 2024
Mrauk-U	8 Feb 2024
Kyauktaw	13 Feb 2024
Myebon	15 Feb 2024
Ponnagyun	4 Mar 2024
Ramree	11 Mar 2024
Rathedaung	17 Mar 2024
Buthidaung	18 May 2024
Thandwe	5 Sep 2024
Taungup	4 Dec 2024
Maungdaw	8 Dec 2024
Ann	20 Dec 2024
Gwa	29 Dec 2024
Munbya	26 Feb 2025

== Governance ==
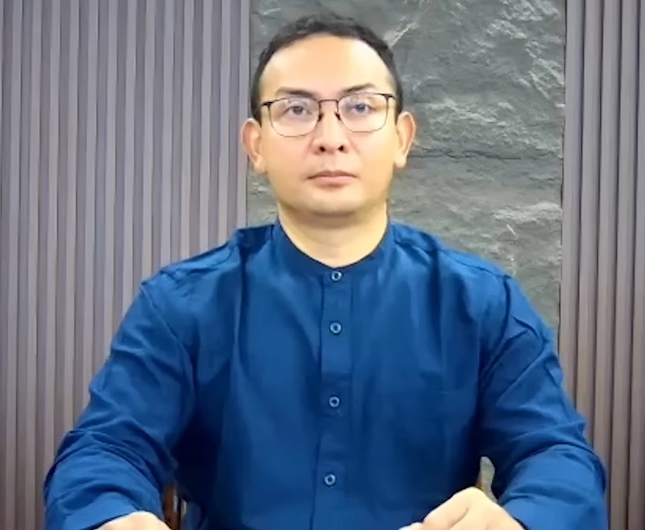
Commander in Chief of the AA, Twan Mrat Naing

In 2019, the Arakan Army established the Arakan People's Revolutionary Government (APRG), back then called the Arakan People's Authority. The duty of the APRG is to govern the territory of the Arakan Army. The APRG controls various departments formed by the government under AA such as the Arakkha People's Public Health Department and Arakkha Education Department.

The ULA/AA's top decision-making system is mainly controlled by the five senior leaders who hold main positions in both the ULA/AA. For governance, the ULA/AA divides its controlled areas into three main military regions called Alpha, Victor, and Nova. Each of these regions is further divided into three or four smaller units. On the administrative side, it uses the same 17 townships as the Myanmar central government in Rakhine State, and it also includes Paletwa in southern Chin State as an administrative area. The ULA/AA runs hospitals, educational institutions, and clinics. In 2022, it created the Humanitarian and Development Coordination Office to manage aid and development assistance. According to reports, there is a lack of technical skills and trained staff due to long years of underdevelopment and weak governance in Rakhine State. Aid organisations report that the ULA/AA's system for approving humanitarian and development work is weak, with inconsistent information flow that can delay or disrupt aid operations.

=== Economy ===
Rakhine State is one of the poorest regions in Myanmar due to neglection from the state government. After AA start governing the area, it has included taxing local people and businesses. It has also tried to extracting natural resources such as minerals and timber, and collecting fees from informal border trade routes with neighboring countries. Some groups are also involved in illegal activities like drug production, money laundering, and cyber-scam operations. In March 2026 the AA began to advocate for more economic regulation, taxing cargo routes and restricting medicine imports. On 7 April 2026, the AA imposed a 50 percent import tax on beverages.

=== Foreign Affairs ===
The People's Republic of Bangladesh has pragmatic relations with the Arakan Army, in the time were the AA detained Bangladeshi fishermen, which were handed over to the Border Guard Bangladesh though official documentation and coordination. The AA reportedly has a representative office in Mizoram State of India.

== Human rights ==
Allegations have been made that minorities such as Rohingyas, Hindu, Mro and Kamein under AA territory are subjected to conscription and forced labor.

On 2 May 2024, it was alleged that the AA massacred civilians of the minority ethnic group Rohingya people after they captured Htan Shauk Khan village in the Buthidaung Township. The armed group has been further accused of serious war crimes.

== See also ==
- People's Government of Kokang
- Ta'ang People's Government
- Wa State
- Chinland
- Karenni State Interim Executive Council
- Republic of Kawthoolei
- Sagaing Federal Unit Interim Government
- Territory of the Kachin Independence Army
