= Sittwe (disambiguation) =

Sittwe may refer to:

- Sittwe, capital town in Rakhine state, Myanmar
- Sittwe (film), 2017 Burmese short film
- Sittwe Port, port in Myanmar
- Sittwe Airport, airport in Myanmar
- Sittwe Township, township in Rakhine state
- Sittwe District, district in Rakhine state
- Sittwe University, University in Myanmar

== See also ==
- Mrauk U (disambiguation)
- Rakhine (disambiguation)
