= Khaing Raza =

Arakanese politician and revolutionary leader (died. 1998)

- Native name: ခိုင်ရာဇာ
- Born: Minbya Township, Arakan State, Burma
- Died: 11 February 1998 Andaman Islands, India
- Allegiance: National United Party of Arakan; Arakan Army
- Commands: Commander in Chief of National United Party of Arakan/Arakan Army (NUPA/AA)
- Conflicts: Internal conflict in Myanmar, Operation Leech

Major General Khaing Raza (Burmese: ခိုင်ရာဇာ; also referred as Bo Raza) was an Arakanese nationalist revolutionary leader and founder of the early Arakan Army, under the National United Party of Arakan (NUPA). He was assassinated with five other rebel leaders by the Indian military on Landfall Island in the Andaman Islands.

== Early life ==
Khaing Raza was born as Hla Tun Aung in Kyaukchaung Village of Minbya Township in Arakan State. He was the third child of seven children. His father was previously been involved as an Arakan guerrilla fighter, and as a result, Khaing Razar grew up in an environment influenced by Arakan nationalist and revolutionary ideas.

At the age of 13, he entered monastic life as a novice monk and studied Buddhist scriptures at monasteries in Sittwe. While continuing his studies there, he developed an interest in political affairs by the age of 16 and became associated with revolutionary groups and political activists.

== Political career ==
He entered politics by becoming involved with the Arakan Liberation Party (ALP), participating in underground activities in Sittwe and Yangon. After the Burma authorities became aware of his involvement, he left the area and moved to parts of Tanintharyi Region, including Myeik and Kawthaung, to avoid arrest.

Due to instability in the leadership of the ALP and the Arakan Liberation Army (ALA), Khaing Raza separated from the organization and established connections in a territory controlled by Karen Brigade 4. There, he worked to gather weapons, recruit personnel, and secure financial support for his own movement.

In February 1991, after strengthening his network and resources, he crossed the Bay of Bengal by motorboat and founded the early Arakan Army along the Arakan–Bangladesh border.

Beginning in 1993, his founded Arakan Army has assigned a representative to oversee relations with India. During this period, he also sought to unify various instable Rakhine revolutionary organizations which led to the formation of the National United Party of Arakan as a political party. During this time, relations with officers from India's Research and Analysis Wing (RAW), were improved, resulting in the relocation of NUPA headquarters from the Bangladesh border area to the India border region.

Under Khaing Raza, by 1997, the group's strength had increased to more than 500 members, with over 200 equipped with rifles. The organization had also developed a small naval unit.

After the Rakhine rebellion emerged in 1994, RAW officers later introduced Khaing Raza to several Indian military and intelligence officials, including Lieutenant Colonel Biswajit Singh Grewal, a Burmese-born Indian intelligence officer who spoke Burmese fluently and had studied at Mandalay University.

In January 1995, Lieutenant General Pradeep Chandran Nair, then Chief of Staff of the Assam Rifles, visited the NUPA/AA base along the India-Myanmar border and met with Khaing Raza. Later, in early 1997, Khaing Razar, with the leader of KNU decided to establish a base in the Andaman Islands to improve access to the Ayeyarwady Delta in southern Myanmar. Permission was later granted for the group to operate from Landfall Island, one of the Andaman Islands located about 300 kilometers from the Myanmar coast.

In June that year, he traveled to Bangkok to meet leaders of the KNU and NUPA/AA, and on February 11, 1998, an agreement was reached to on the island. On February 8, 1998, a group of 13 KNU fighters and 27 NUPA/AA members, led by Khaing Raza and Major Soe Htun, departed from the Tanintharyi coast in southern Burma aboard two boats bound for Landfall Island.

=== Death ===
On the morning of February 11, around 8 a.m., an Indian naval vessel approached the island. Colonial Grewel informed him that senior Indian officials would arrive by helicopter for discussions and lunch. When the helicopter arrived, Khaing Razar, and five others rebel with him, were reportedly separated and taken to the middle of beach, where Indian authorities accused them of arms smuggling and executed them by shooting. The Indian military later stated that the operation targeted arms smugglers allegedly linked to anti-India insurgent groups in the country's northeast.

After his death, the NUPA/AA has been struggling in terms of military, political, and internal party activities. The political party later merged with the United League of Arakan.

== Personal life ==
He was survived by his wife, Daw Naw Htwe, and had two sons.

== Legacy ==
Khaing Raza Day as a memorial is held yearly to mark the anniversary of his death on 11 February. The General Khain Razar Foundation was also established in February 2025 in honor of his legacy.

Commemorative events for Khaing Razar could only be organized in Thailand, Bangladesh, or India. After the Arakan Army took majority of the control of Rakhine State, the event is held locally.
