= Hoyyar Siri massacre =

2024 massacre in Buthidaung Township

- Location: Hoyyar Siri village, Buthidaung Township, Rakhine State, Myanmar
- Date: 2 May 2024
- Target: Rohingya people
- Attack type: Massacre, ethnic cleansing, mass shooting
- Deaths: 170 civilians (confirmed by HWR) est. 500-600+ (claimed)
- Injuries: 100+
- Perpetrator: Arakan Army (accused)
- Motive: Anti-Rohingya sentiment

On 2 May 2024, a massacre of Rohingya civilians took place allegedly by the Arakan Army (AA) in Hoyyar Siri (Htan Shauk Khan in Burmese) village in Buthidaung Township, Rakhine State, Myanmar. According to an investigation by Human Rights Watch, at least 170 Rohingya civilians were killed, with survivors alleging that fighters from the Arakan Army opened fire on villagers fleeing clashes with the Myanmar military.

Before the attack, Hoyyar Siri had about 1,200 residents and had settlements of homes, shops, mosques, and ponds. After the incident, Arakan Army reportedly killed and injured hundreds of civilians there and later destroyed the village.

== Background ==
Hoyyar Siri (also known as Htan Shauk Khan) was a local Muslim village located in Buthidaung Township of Rakhine State. It was between two Myanmar military positions, the 15th Military Operations Command (MOC-15) and the 551st Light Infantry Battalion (LIB-551). In April 2024, fighting intensified in northern Rakhine State between the Myanmar junta and the Arakan Army. Many displaced Rohingya from nearby villages moved into Hoyyar Siri because they believed it was relatively safer due to its proximity to military camps.

== Timeline ==
=== Prelude ===
Hoyyar Siri consisted of two hamlets, Bor Para and Fatailla Para. 20 days before the incident, a Myanmar military captain, Bo Gyi Kyaw, demanded that the village provide 20 Rohingya volunteers to fight against the Arakan Army, warning that the village would be burned if the request was refused. Villagers then eventually agreed to send at least a dozen men. The military was also reported to have cooperated with Rohingya armed groups, including the Arakan Rohingya Salvation Army (ARSA). On the evening of May 1, the AA issued a loudspeaker announcement in both Rakhine and Rohingya languages ordering all residents of the village to leave the area. Two conflicting orders were received from the two sides: the Arakan Army urged civilians to evacuate, while the Myanmar military instructed them to stay.

=== Massacre ===
During the night of 1 May 2024, intense fighting erupted around junta positions around the MOC-15 military operations command and the LIB-551 battalion base. Rohingya villagers were being trapped between retreating junta forces and advancing Arakan Army fighters.

By the early morning of May 2, after the AA had taken control of the MOC-15 camp, junta soldiers began moving into Hoyyar Siri from the northern side, near LIB-551. Large numbers of Rohingya civilians began fleeing Hoyyar Siri carrying white flags or improvised signs showing they were noncombatants. Around 7 a.m., large groups of villagers started moving north toward Buthidaung town to a hill area named Toinna Mura, where AA fighters appeared from multiple directions and reportedly opened fire on the crowd without prior warnings. Later, remaining fleeing villagers reportedly took shelter in a paddy field near a mosque in Fatailla Para, where they were later gathered nearby, and further killings are alleged to have taken place.

According to eyewitness accounts and satellite imagery conducted by HRW, after killing civilians, AA forces looted and burned homes in the village. According to Kaladan Press Network, the AA troops allegedly raped and detained women's as sex slaves at a nearby military base. Witnesses also described villagers being forced to sit in rows with their heads lowered before an order was reportedly issued over a walkie-talkie after which AA troops would opened fire.

== Aftermath ==
Following the violence, Arakan Army detained the civilians and allegedly subjected them to mistreatment. Survivors said the AA stole cash and jewelry, kidnapped Rohingya women and girls, and abused detainees with beatings and torture.

=== Casualties ===
According to report by Human Rights Watch, the death toll could be higher as 170 while hundreds were likely injured. Meanwhile, Rohingya activists has claimed over 500-600 people may have been killed. Many victims appeared to have been executed at close range and at least 90 women and children are among the dead toll. According to the Arakan Army, the death toll was about 200 soldiers saying no civilians were targeted.

== Investigation ==
On 4 August 2025, the Arakan Rohingya National Council (ARNC) released a statement alleging that the Arakan Army was responsible for the killing of more than 600 Rohingya civilians. The statement was issued more than a year after the reported incident. Earlier reports of the alleged killings appeared on 6 May 2024, when the Rohingya National League shared claims on social media stating that 111 members from 16 Rohingya families had been killed by the AA on 2 May 2024. On 3 August 2025, Rohingya activist Ro Nay San Lwin posted about the incident on X, depicting large human remains deposition site within the Htan Shauk Khan village claiming 600 Rohingya civilians were killed.

The Arakan Army has denied involvement in the massacre and said it did not target civilians. AA Spokesperson Khaing Thu Kha claimed the allegations as a smear campaign and said the bodies shown in reports were those of Tatmadaw soldiers and Muslim conscripts. On 23 October 2025, AA Chief Twan Mrat Naing has invited the UN Special Rapporteur to investigate allegations of human rights in northern Rakhine, including in the Htan Shauk Khan.

In August 2025, during an interview by the Irrawaddy with Lieutenant Colonel Kaung Myat, a former deputy commander of MOC-15 who was at the scene, rejected the claims of 600 Rohingyas being killed. According to him, more than 200 Rohingya militia fighters retreated together with the junta troops and the skeletal remains found near the village were the remains of junta soldiers and Rohingya fighters trained by the military.

Between March and November 2025, Fortify Rights interviewed 15 Rohingya eyewitnesses about the massacre including those who later fled to Malaysia and Bangladesh camps. In an August 2025 report, Volker Türk documented the atrocities by the AA against Rohingya civilians, including in the Htan Shauk Khan village which forced many to flee their homes. Many survivors have alleged that AA forced many of the victims to give false testimony. In August 2024, representatives of AA-controlled media visited the area where Rohingya victims were allegedly forced to provide false statements on video saying no such incident occurred.

Two years after the incident, on 18 May 2026, the Human Rights Watch reported about the incident using satellite imagery alongside photos and videos provided by researchers, identifying at least 170 victims claiming that they were killed by AA. The United League of Arakan in response has strongly condemned the reporting, terming it as "baseless" and "fabricated" accusation made by Muslim activists abroad to distort the international reputation of AA and bring distrust among communities in Rakhine state.

Radio Free Asia stated the AA spokesperson, Khaing Thu Kha, claimed the allegations were an attempt by human rights groups to coincide with UN meetings to secure fundings. Rakhine politician Wai Hun Aung stated the AA is willing to address the allegations but there is no solution yet until the war is over.

The Myanmar military spokesperson, Zaw Min Tun, said there were no Tatmadaw forces or security guards on the area when the incident occurred regarding the massacre.
