= Arakan People's Revolutionary Government =

Administrative division in Myanmar

The Arakan People's Revolutionary Government (Burmese: အာရက္ခပြည်သူ့တော်လှန်ရေးအစိုးရ; abbreviated as APRG) is the administrative wing of the Arakan Army (AA), formed to govern the vast majority of Rakhine State in Myanmar, where it controls 15 of 17 townships and over 90% of the territory since late 2024. Operating under the United League of Arakan (ULA), the APRG establishes local administrative, judicial, and public health systems, aiming for confederate status.

== History ==
The administration was initially called the Arakan People's Authority (APA) in 2019 under ULA. It was later renamed to the Arakan People's Revolutionary Government (APRG). The APRG has built expertise in administration, taxation, land management, judiciary and humanitarian response, including handling emergencies during the Covid-19 and Cyclone Mocha.

In March 2024, the APRG has invited foreign investors to cooperate and invest to benefit in the regional stability of Rakhine State.

The APRG and local Arakanese on early 2024 denied efforts on Rohingya repatriation. In April 2025, around 19 mosques were built under the Arakan People's Revolutionary Government.

The APRG has significantly recruited trainees for health department and midwifery training. In February 2026, the government has taken initiatives to repair and rehabilitate inter-town and village road sections damaged during the conflicts and rainy seasons.

The APRG announced the formation of Arakan National University for the 2026–27 academic year in February 2026 as part of a stated goal to resume higher education to students affected by fighting in AA-controlled areas. Eligibility only applies to those who passed their third year during prior university studies. Those who passed the fourth year are eligible for the law program.

In July 2026, the APRG announced the renaming of Pauktaw and Minbya to the Pali Vīraṭṭhānī and Añjanapura, along with the replacement of Burmese language with Rakhine language in the Grade 12 educational curriculum.
