= Ponnagyun =

Ponakyun ပုဏ္ဏားကျွန်းမြို့
- Town
- Location in Myanmar (Burma)
- Coordinates: 20°20′03″N 93°00′14″E
- Country: Myanmar
- Division: Rakhine State
- District: Sittwe District
- Township: Ponnagyun Township

Population (2014 census)
  - Total: 129,753
  - Religions: Buddhism
- Time zone: UTC+6.30 (MMT)

Ponnagyun (Burmese: ပုဏ္ဏားကျွန်းမြို့) is a town in Rakhine State, in the westernmost part of Myanmar (Burma). It is the administrative seat of the Ponnagyun Township. The southern part of Ponnagyun is crisscrossed by small streams and rivers. The northern part is mountainous. The Urittaung Pagoda, across the Kaladan River from Ponnagyun, overlooks the town.

== History ==
The Ponnagyun police station was captured by the Arakan Army (AA) on 22 February 2024 from the Myanmar Police Force during the Myanmar Civil War. The AA claimed to have captured the city on 5 March 2024.
