= Mrauk U (disambiguation) =

Mrauk U may refer to:

- Mrauk U, town in northern Rakhine state
- Mrauk-U Township, township in Rakhine state
- Mrauk U Kingdom, Arakanese Kingdom in western Myanmar
- Mrauk-U District, district of Rakhine state in Myanmar

== See also ==
- Arakan (disambiguation)
- Rakhine (disambiguation)
