= BEHS Minbya =

Coordinates: 20°22′N 93°16′E

No.1, BEHS, Minbya
- အ.ထ.က (၁) (မင်းပြား)
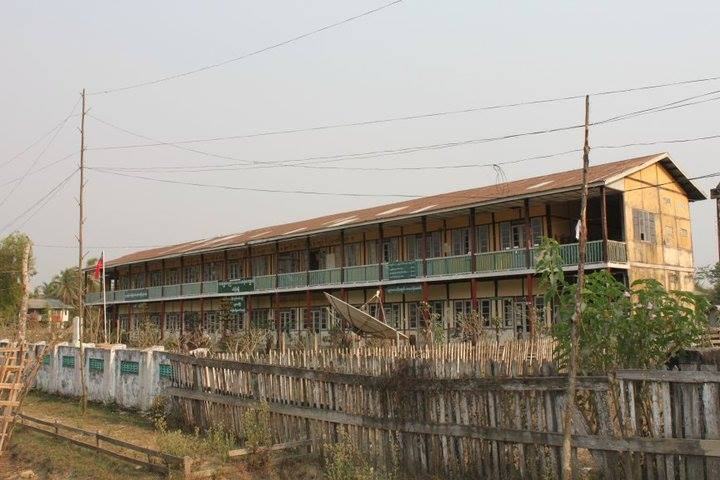

Location
- 12 U Kyaw Oo Road; Minbya 11191; Minbya, Rakhine State; Myanmar

Information
- Type: Public
- Mottoes: Do we learn not for school but for life
- Established: 1942
- School number: 1
- Faculty: 150
- Grades: K-10
- Enrollment: 2000
- Campus: 3.472 acres

BEHS Minbya (Burmese: မင်းပြားမြို့ အထကကျောင်း) is the only high school in Minbya, the westernmost part of Myanmar.
