= Kyauktaw =

Kyauktaw ကျောက်တော်မြို့
- Town
- Location in Myanmar
- Coordinates: 20°50′38″N 92°58′03″E
- Country: Myanmar
- Division: Rakhine State
- District: Mrauk-U District
- Township: Kyauktaw Township

Population
  - Religions: Buddhism; Christianity; Hinduism; Islam
- Time zone: UTC+6.30 (MMT)

Kyauktaw (Burmese: ကျောက်တော်မြို့ [tɕaʊʔtɔ̀ mjo̰]) is a town in northern Rakhine State, in the westernmost part of Myanmar. The famous Mahamuni Buddha image, currently at Amarapura, was originally situated near Kyauktaw, in the ruins of the old city of Dhanyawadi.

The town was captured by the Arakan Army around 12 February 2024 from the Tatmadaw during the Myanmar Civil War. It was reported that some villagers of the town attacked Tatmadaw soldiers who had swum to shore after their boats were sunk with knives.

== Location ==
Kyauktaw Township is situated 65 miles (105 km) from the north of Sittwe Township, the capital city of Rakhine State. It is located approximately between latitudes 20° 37' north and 21° 11' north and longitudes 92° 50' east and 93° 88' east from the north of Kaladan River. The Kispanadi Bridge is located at the entrance to Kyauktaw, traversing the Kaladan River.

== Area ==
The area of Kyauktaw Township is nearly 675.55 square miles (1,749.7 km^{2}). Kyauktaw is bordered by Mrauk U, around 27 miles (43 km) from the east, Buthidaung, around 30 miles (48 km) from the west, Ponnagyun, 45 miles (72 km) from the south and Pallawa Township of Chin State, around 40 miles (64 km) from the north. It stretches 19 miles (31 km) from east to west and 35 miles (56 km) from north to south.

== Rivers ==
1. Kaladan River (Kispanadi) (ကုလားတိုင်မြစ်)
2. Pi Chung (ပီေခ်ာင္း)
3. Priang Chung (ၿပိဳင္းေခ်ာင္း)
4. Thari Chung (သရီေခ်ာင္း)
5. Pigauk Chung (ပီေကာက္ေခ်ာင္း)
6. Yoo Chung (ယိုးေခ်ာင္း)
7. Minne Chung (မီးေခ်ာင္း)
8. Ywar Ma Pyin (ရြာမျပင္)

== Climate ==
Kyauktaw has three seasons; the monsoon or rainy season is from May to October; the cool season or winter from November to February and the hot season or summer from March to May. The average temperature range during the summer is from 32 to 40 °C. The average rainfall range during the rainy season is from 431 to 482 centimeters. There was a flood in July 2011.

Climate data for Kyauktaw (1991–2020)
Month	Jan	Feb	Mar	Apr	May	Jun	Jul	Aug	Sep	Oct	Nov	Dec	Year
Mean daily maximum °C (°F)	29.5 (85.1)	32.2 (90.0)	35.3 (95.5)	36.8 (98.2)	34.8 (94.6)	31.5 (88.7)	30.2 (86.4)	30.7 (87.3)	32.1 (89.8)	32.8 (91.0)	31.7 (89.1)	29.7 (85.5)	32.3 (90.1)
Daily mean °C (°F)	20.8 (69.4)	22.8 (73.0)	26.4 (79.5)	29.5 (85.1)	29.2 (84.6)	27.8 (82.0)	27.3 (81.1)	27.5 (81.5)	28.1 (82.6)	28.1 (82.6)	25.6 (78.1)	22.3 (72.1)	26.3 (79.3)
Mean daily minimum °C (°F)	12.2 (54.0)	13.3 (55.9)	17.6 (63.7)	22.1 (71.8)	23.6 (74.5)	24.2 (75.6)	24.3 (75.7)	24.3 (75.7)	24.2 (75.6)	23.3 (73.9)	19.6 (67.3)	14.8 (58.6)	20.3 (68.5)
Average precipitation mm (inches)	6.9 (0.27)	9.2 (0.36)	28.3 (1.11)	50.9 (2.00)	380.9 (15.00)	966.4 (38.05)	1,250.4 (49.23)	878.0 (34.57)	482.4 (18.99)	250.9 (9.88)	56.9 (2.24)	14.4 (0.57)	4,375.6 (172.27)
Average precipitation days (≥ 1.0 mm)	0.6	0.8	1.4	4.3	15.2	24.1	28.2	27.1	21.4	11.4	3.5	1.2	139.4
Source: World Meteorological Organization

== Economy ==
Kyauktaw has many sugar mills and sugarcane plantations.

== Religious buildings ==
1. Buddhist monasteries
  1. Downtown (5)
  2. Uptown (201)
2. Mosques
  1. Downtown (3)
  2. Uptown (102)
3. Churches
  1. Downtown (3)
  2. Uptown (5)
4. Hindu temple
  1. Downtown (1)
