= Forced conscription of Rohingya in Myanmar =

Forced recruitment of Rohingya during the Myanmar civil war

Forced conscription of Rohingya in Myanmar began in early 2024, when the Myanmar Armed Forces started drafting Rohingya men and boys in Rakhine State to fight the Arakan Army. The law it relied on applies only to citizens, a status most Rohingya have been denied since 1982.

== Background ==
Seven years after driving some 700,000 Rohingya into Bangladesh, the military was losing ground to the Arakan Army in Rakhine. In February 2024 it brought into force the People's Military Service Law, a previously dormant 2010 conscription law. Before 2024, the Tatmadaw forced Rohingya people to build military fortifications and porter supplies.

== Recruitment ==
Within two months, more than 1,000 Rohingya had been taken from villages and from the displacement camps near Sittwe. Some were threatened with losing their food rations if they refused. After about two weeks of training, they were paid roughly US$24 and sent to the front.

Young men were also abducted from the refugee camps in Cox's Bazar, Bangladesh, by Rohingya armed groups and handed to the Myanmar military. In May 2024, over 1,000 refugees, most of them women, protested in Kutupalong refugee camp to stop three men being taken. On 29 July 2026, the Tatmadaw sent letters to "Muslim" Rohingya communities in Sittwe to provide a recruit from each household. The Arakan Army faces accusations of forcing Rohingya to fight as well; AA denied the allegations and claim that they explain the responsibility of war after carefully picking recruits.

== Discrimination ==
According to several men who escaped conscription, Rohingya conscripts were assigned more duties than other soldiers, and received substandard medical care. They could not fire weapons without permission and were placed in the middle of formations to make human shields.

== Reactions ==
UN Secretary General António Guterres raised concerns in March 2024. Human Rights Watch said the recruitment broke Myanmar's own law, and Fortify Rights said the cross border abductions could amount to human trafficking.

== See also ==
- Rohingya genocide
- Burning of Buthidaung
