= Myebon =

Myebon မြေပုံမြို့
- Town
- Location in Myanmar (Burma)
- Coordinates: 20°3′0″N 93°22′0″E
- Country: Myanmar
- Division: Rakhine State
- District: Mrauk-U District
- Township: Myebon Township

Population (2014 census)
  - Total: 137,193
- Time zone: UTC+06:30 (MMT)

Myebon (Burmese: မြေပုံမြို့ Myebon Township) is a town of Mrauk-U District in Rakhine State, Myanmar (Burma). In the 2014 census, the population of the town is 137,193.

On 12 January 1945, troops of XV Corps and 3rd Commando Brigade launched an amphibious assault on the Myebon peninsula, with the support of tanks, aircraft and naval gunfire as part of flanking moves to intercept and defeat the retreating troops of the Japanese Twenty-Eighth Army in the Southern front of the Burma Campaign in World War II. Myebon village was attacked and secured the next day.

On 15 February 2024 the Arakan Army captured the town from the Tatmadaw during the Myanmar civil war.
