= Arakan (disambiguation) =

Arakan is a historical region of Burma.

Arakan may also refer to:

- Rakhine State, a province of Myanmar
- Arakan Mountains, Myanmar
- Arakan, Cotabato, Philippines
- Arakan River, Philippines
- Arakan Division, a British colonial division

== See also ==
- Arakan Army
- Arakanese (disambiguation)
- Rakhine (disambiguation)
- Rakan (disambiguation)
