= Burning of Buthidaung =

2024 Burning of Buthidaung, Myanmar

- Part of the Myanmar civil war
- Location: Buthidaung, Rakhine State
- Date: 13 April – 18 May 2024
- Deaths: 46
- Perpetrators: Myanmar Army: No. (15) Military Operations Command; Rohingya conscripts; Arakan Army (denied); Myanmar Air Force (denied)

The Burning of Buthidaung (Burmese: ဘူးသီးတောင်မြို့) refers to the deliberate burning of much of Buthidaung, allegedly by Rohingya conscripts under the command of the Myanmar Army's MOC-15 (Military Operations Command-15) and by the Arakanese insurgent group, Arakan Army, during the siege and capture of Buthidaung.

== Prelude ==
In March 2024, as the Arakan Army advanced toward Buthidaung, the Myanmar military began recruiting Rohingya locals. The following month, military officers reportedly coerced Rohingya conscripts into burning and looting the homes of their Rakhine Buddhist neighbors, resulting in widespread destruction in southern and western Buthidaung, areas predominantly inhabited by the Rakhine community.

Myanmar Army forces had retreated from the town by 15 May 2024. Around 6:30 P.M, 17 May, Rohingya elders met with Arakan Army soldiers in a nearby village. There, the soldiers instructed residents to evacuate immediately. Locals refused, stating that they had nowhere else to go. Arakan Army forces entered the town hours later.

== Burning ==
Satellite imagery indicates that large areas of southern and western Buthidaung, areas predominantly inhabited by the Rakhine community, were destroyed by arson perpetrated by Myanmar Army and Rohingya conscripts between April 13 and 16. During this period, Médecins Sans Frontières (MSF) reported that its office adjacent to the town's main highway had also been burned on April 15. According to Data for Myanmar, an independent research group, approximately 1,500 buildings were destroyed in the April arson attacks, based on satellite imagery analysis.

At 9:30 P.M, a local reported that northern Buthidaung residents began to flee their homes, “warning us that the AA were coming and burning houses.” At around 10 P.M, 17 May, residents reported that AA soldiers began setting fire to buildings in Buthidaung using petrol-soaked sticks. Starting with the southern area of the town, fires were set encircling the town. After local Rohingya attempted to shelter in the town's hospital, the hospital was also set alight. Many Rohingya fled either north towards the Bangladesh–Myanmar border, or west to the junta controlled town of Maungdaw, many of the latter grouping near the Buthidaung prison. The fleeing civilians were stopped by Arakha Army soldiers, who fired into the air, triggering a crowd crush. Fleeing Rohingya were also harassed and extorted. Eventually, up to 200,000 Rohingyas were displaced due to the fires, many without food or medicine. Many others sought safety in central Buthidaung, seeking shelter in any available spaces.

== Reactions ==
Yanghee Lee, the former UN special rapporteur on Myanmar and founder of SAC-M, stated that “There are credible reports that Rohingya in Buthidaung have been targeted in attacks by the AA. There is a very real risk that these attacks could escalate further.” James Rodehaver, head of the U.N. office on human rights for Myanmar, told Reuters that “every indication” from his organisation's interviews with residents suggested the Arakan Army was responsible. The Arakan Army denied that they had any role in the towns's burning, claiming that a Tatmadaw airstrike had caused the fire and accusing the local Rohingya population of being “saboteurs” and “selfish”.
