= Way of Rakhita =

Political doctrine and slogan associated with the Arakan Army

The Way of Rakhita is a political doctrine, slogan and vision associated with the Arakan Army (AA), an armed group based on Rakhine State, Myanmar. The armed group promotes the term, which the AA chief, Twan Mrat Naing, has described it as a struggle for national liberation and for restoring sovereignty over Arakan to its people. It is inspired by the Arakan Kingdom that fell in 1784.

The Arakan Dream represents the goal of self-rule which aims for people in Rakhine State to have real control over governance, resources, and identity. The Way of Rakhita is regarded as the practical policy used to achieve the Arakan Dream.

Flag of the Arakan Army

== Background ==
The Way of Rakhita is connected to the Arakan Dream, which both are closely connected to the history of Rakhine State. In Rakhine political memory, local figures played an important role in the country’s independence struggle. Many locals believed that independence would lead to a fair system where different ethnic groups would share power in a federal or inclusive state. Early Rakhine political actors did not mainly aim for separation but expected cooperation in building a new country. The views were supported by historical events in Burmese nationalism such as, during discussions about National Day in 1921, several important proposed dates were linked to Rakhine figures, including the imprisonment of U Ottama and the role of Rakhine leaders in student movements.

However, after independence in 1948, many Rakhine people felt the expectations were not fulfilled. Central governments were seen as dominated by the majority group, while promises of equality and autonomy were not achieved.

== History ==
The term "Way of Rakhita" was first publicly reported in a speech by the General Twan Mrat Naing during the Arakan Army fifth anniversary commemorations held on April 10, 2014. In that address, Twan Mrat Naing said:

“Comrades, as the position of Arakanese at this time, is highly fragile and dangerous, we can be easily fallen into the enemy’s trap. Thus, it is critical to fight to stand united under virtuous and systematic leadership and clear strategy. To solve the current problem and future challenges being faced by our people, the ‘Way of Rakhita’ followed by the whole people should be formulated and implemented."

In a related account, the idea of the concept was born during the commencement of Arakan National Conference held in Kyaukphyu on April 28, 2014, which was reported as the largest gathering of all Rakhine people in 68 years. Following this event, a statement reportedly called for forming an Arakan National Defence Army. However, at this stage, Way of Rakhita was not clearly defined in public documents and mainly appeared in speeches and interviews. After the 2015 general election, Myanmar went through a period of limited democratization when the National League for Democracy (NLD), led by Aung San Suu Kyi, came to power.

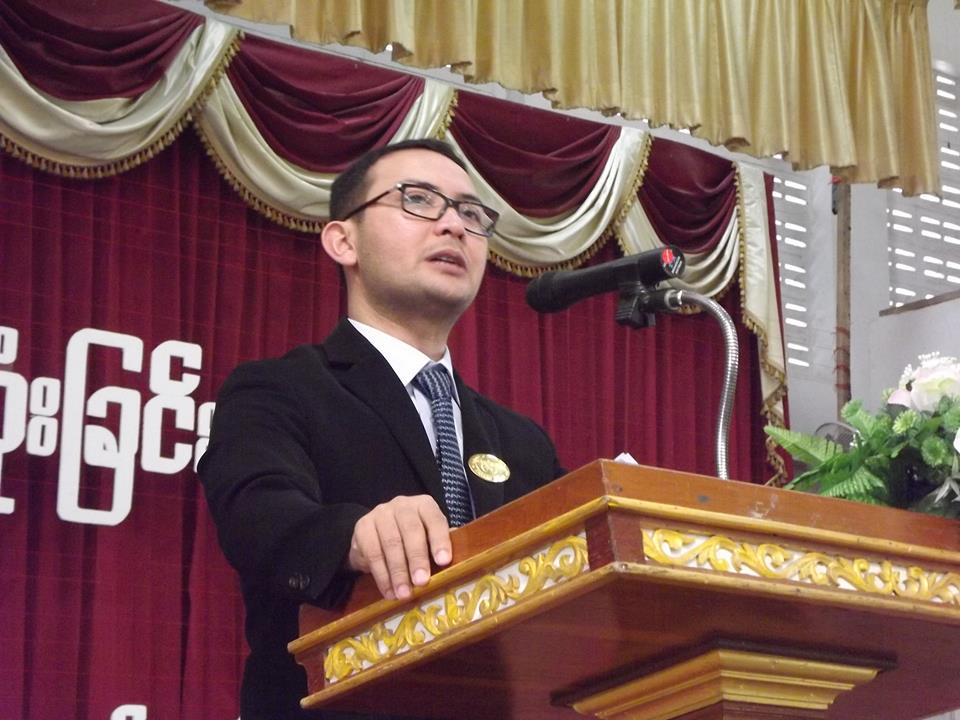
General Twan Mrat Naing in 2016

Later, in a video released in January 2018 by the Tribal Action Group and other public statements, Twan Mrat Naing referred to Arakan history and heritage, especially the ancient Arakan Kingdom, as a source of pride. He claimed the Arakan Kingdom was once very rich and that they were proud of their ancestral history. He later stated under the Burmese rule, the people became very poor and lost many things, including the rights of indigenous people.

During the period of armed conflict in Rakhine State in 2019, the AA leadership officially described the "Way of Rakhita" as a pathway intended to pursue self-determination and the establishment of a dignified Arakan society. In a 2024 interview with BBC Burmese, it was further explained that the concept initially aligned with an “Arakan Dream” influenced by local aspirations, but later evolved to take into account broader national conditions and the situation of other ethnic groups in relation to military rule.

David Scott Mathieson claimed that many local Rakhine people began to support the AA due to the NLD government's negative response towards the Rakhine local people. After the military coup in 2021, the implementation of the policy of Way of Rakhita has been further accelerated.

== Principle ==
The Way of the Rakhita is regraded as a force or slogan to unify the Rakhine people by evoking the memories of once-great Arakanese Kingdom. It is also coined as the "Rakhita Principle". The word Rakhita is an ancient term, meaning "protected or guardian land" in Pali. The principle additionally asserts Rakhine people must take all responsibility of their own destiny and future.

The Way of Rakhita philosophy is known to be based on four main principles: nationalism, militarism, historical re-evaluation, and pragmatism. First, its nationalism is described as territorial rather than ethnic nationalism which is believed to be beyond central Rakhine ethnic identity. Second, the way is described as believing that the main path to Arakanese liberation is armed struggle. Third, it has emphasized learning from past mistakes through a reassessment of history. The AA leader has stated that after 1988, the NLD promised federalism to ethnic groups but did not fulfill these promises after coming to power. Lastly, it is described as prioritizing pragmatism over idealism or rigid doctrine.

The policy has been used to establish confederate status by the AA on Rakhine State, by which the armed group has rejected the idea of external organizations or other ethnic groups determining that region's future.

== Criticism ==
The AA's armed conflict with the ideology of Way of Rakhita has been cited as an ethno-nationalist ideology and exceptionalism concept which has a contributing factor to persistent ethnic tensions. It is alleged that AA leadership, Twan Mrat Naing, has maintained an unclear stance regarding the status of the Rohingya population under its influence. At times, the AA has referred to Rohingyas as illegal migrants who arrived in Rakhine following the collapse of the Arakanese Kingdom.
