= Pauktaw =

Pauktaw ပေါက်တော
- Town
- Pauktaw
- Location in Myanmar (Burma)
- Coordinates: 20°12′46″N 93°7′51″E
- Country: Myanmar
- Division: Rakhine State
- District: Sittwe District
- Township: Pauktaw Township
- Control: Arakan Army

Area
  - Total: 0.14 sq mi (0.36 km^{2})

Population (2019)
  - Total: 19,157
  - Density: 140,000/sq mi (53,000/km^{2})
- Time zone: UTC+06:30 (MMT)

Pauktaw (Burmese: ပေါက်တောမြို့ ; also known as Werathani) is the principal town of Pauktaw Township in Sittwe District in Rakhine State, Myanmar (Burma).

== History ==
On 16 November 2023 the town was briefly captured by the Arakan Army (AA) during the ongoing civil war, following the resumption of hostilities after the ceasefire between the AA and the Tatmadaw military junta broke down. Following heavy bombardment by air and sea, the military retook the town a day later. However, the AA again captured the town on 24 January 2024. On 28 July 2026, the United League of Arakan renamed the town to Werathani.

== Etymology ==
The name Werathani (Rakhine: ဝီရဌာနီ) means "Abode of the Brave" in Pali.
