= Tin Tin Nyo =

Human rights activist from Myanmar

Tin Tin Nyo (Burmese: တင်တင်ညို) is a Burmese women's rights and democracy activist. She was the general secretary of the Women's League of Burma (WLB), an umbrella organization comprising various women's groups advocating for women's rights and political participation.

== Activism ==
Tin Tin Nyo has spent nearly two decades advocating for women's rights under the Women's League of Burma (WLB), a coalition of 13 women's organizations, and was appointed General Secretary of the organization. In 2013, she was honored by the Global Fund for Women for her advocacy work.

Tin Tin Nyo served as the chairperson of the Burmese Wome's Union (BWU) from 2015 to 2021. Since 2019, she became managing director of Burma News International (BNI), an umbrella organization of ethnic minority media in Myanmar promoting independent journalism and human rights. Under her leadership, BNI was honored with the Hiroshima Foundation for Peace and Culture Award in 2023 for its dedication to peacebuilding and democracy. She retired from her position as general secretary of WLB in 2021 and remained in the organization as an advisor.

Tin Tin Nyo has been an outspoken critic of Myanmar's military regime and her network has provided support to the demonstrations, noting that it is tracking false information on social media and keeping watch for incidents of sexual violence, harassment, or torture targeting women involved in the protests. In 2021, she participated in a panel discussion hosted by The Diplomat, analyzing the political crisis following the military coup.
