= Khaing Thu Kha =

Arakan Army spokesperson and information minister

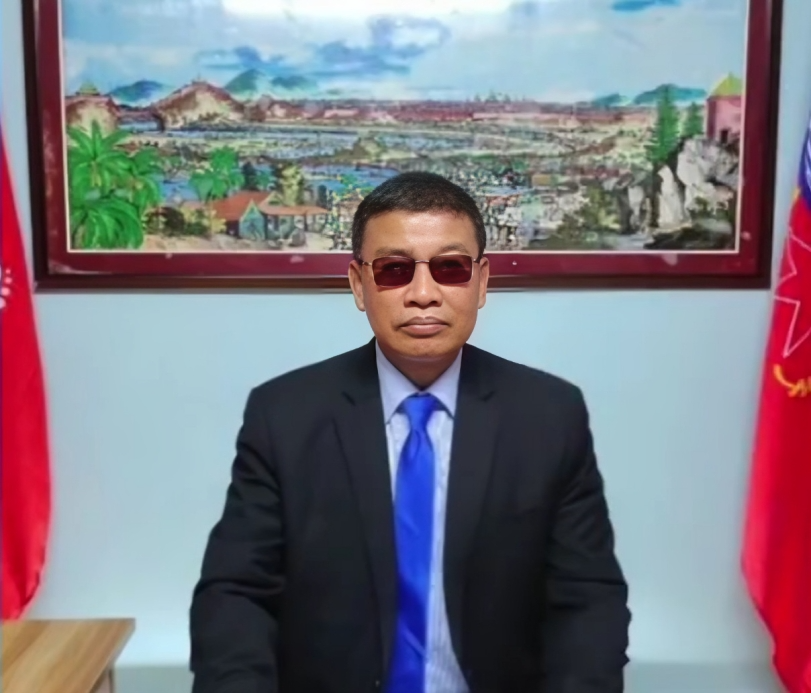
- Spokesperson Khaing Thu Kha
- Native name: ခိုင်သုခ
- Born: May 13, 1970 (age 55); Ann District, Rakhine State, Myanmar
- Allegiance: Arakan Army
- Branch: Arakan Army
- Service years: 2014–present
- Rank: Public Relations Officer
- Commands: In charge of Arakan Army News Information
- Conflicts: Myanmar conflict; Myanmar civil war (2021–present)

Khaing Thu Kha (Burmese: ခိုင်သုခ; pronounced [kʰaɪŋ θu kʰa], also spelled as Khine Thu Kha; born 1970) is an Arakanese politician who is the spokesperson and the news and information officer of the Arakan Army (AA), an armed group advocating for the autonomy and self-determination of the Rakhine people in Myanmar.

== Career ==
Due to his support for the Rakhine Nationalist Party, he joined the Arakan Army (Provisional) on January 8, 1991. The group was a precursor to the current Arakan Army and was first based in areas controlled by the Karen National Union (KNU) in Karen State. Over the next decades, it sought to establish a foothold in Rakhine State.

However, his efforts faced numerous challenges. In 1991 and 1992, he attempted to cross into Rakhine State via Bangladesh but was arrested by Bangladeshi authorities. In his first arrest, he was detained for two months and ten days. Following his second arrest, he was convicted on weapons charges and sentenced to five years in prison.

After his release from prison, he worked with the Arakan Liberation Party (ALP). In April 2012, he became part of the party's leadership and represented the ALP in signing the preliminary ceasefire agreement during peace talks between the government and the ALP.

In 2014, he left the Arakan Liberation Party (ALP) following disagreements among the party’s top leaders. He then joined Twan Mrat Naing, a young Rakhine leader, and helped establish the United League of Arakan (ULA), the political wing of the Arakan Army.
