= United League of Arakan =

United League of Arakan ရက္ခိုင့်အမျိုးသားအဖွဲ့ချုပ်
- Abbreviation: ULA
- Chairman: Twan Mrat Naing
- Spokesperson: Khine Thu Kha
- Vice Chairman: Nyo Twan Awng
- Secretary General: Twan Morn Naing
- Founded: 2016
- Armed wing: Arakan Army
- Membership (2025): 100,000+
- Ideology: Arakanese nationalism Confederalism
- Anthem: အာရက္ခနိုင်ငံတော်; Arakha Land

Party flag

Website
- www.ulaparty.com (archived copy)

The United League of Arakan (ULA; Burmese: ရက္ခိုင့်အမျိုးသားအဖွဲ့ချုပ်) is an Arakanese political organisation based in Laiza, Kachin State, Myanmar. Its armed wing is the Arakan Army. Major General Twan Mrat Naing is the ULA's chairman and Brigadier General Nyo Twan Awng is in the secretary. The United League of Arakan is the member of the Federal Political Negotiation and Consultative Committee (FPNCC), the political negotiation team formed by seven ethnic armed groups in Myanmar.

The United League of Arakan established the Arakan People's Revolutionary Government to administer the areas that AA controls. The APRG performs duties such as issuing travel permits to Mizoram, India, distributing food to IDPs, policing, and implementing healthcare systems.

== History ==
The 1st United League of Arakan conference, attended by delegates from various countries, was held from 10 to 16 January 2016, seven consecutive days in a liberated area. The ULA was organised by the 21 central committee members who chairman, General Secretary, Secretary (1), Secretary (2), Secretary (3), Special Advisory Group. Twan Mrat Naing is responsible the chairman of United League of Arakan and Nyo Twan Awng is in charge of the secretariat. No other names announced.

The ULA announced the formation of Arakan National University for the 2026–27 academic year in February 2026 as part of a stated goal to resume higher education to students affected by fighting in AA-controlled areas. Eligibility only applies to those who passed their third year during prior university studies. Those who passed the fourth year are eligible for the law program.

In July 2026, the ULA announced the renaming of Pauktaw and Minbya to the Pali Vīraṭṭhānī and Añjanapura, along with the replacement of Burmese language with Rakhine language in the Grade 12 educational curriculum.

== Controversy ==
The Singaporean police force arrested those who were involved in the United League of Arakan's movements and they were deported back to Myanmar on 10 July 2019. Myanmar police detained and arrested Arakanese youths repatriated from Singapore at Rangoon airport. In the Myanmar police force complaint the United League of Arakan led by Aung Myat Kyaw, who was the younger brother of Twan Mrat Naing, and three others Tun Aye, Than Tun Naing and Soe Soe was established in Singapore in 2013. There were about 86 members. Police allege that the members monthly pay the fees and they supported the monthly fees to the United League of Arakan and Arakan Army.

However, the United League of Arakan was formed only in 2016, according to the Mrauk-U survey book. The book was written by Maung Maung Soe who received the Myanmar National Literature Award for 2017.

From 16 to 17 April 2025, the ULA held a Sangrai festival in Thanchi Upazila in Bangladesh's Chittagong Hill Tracts. This sparked concerns about potential sovereignty issues.

=== Rohingya crisis ===
Since 2024, the ULA is continually attempting reconciliation with the Rohingya minority in its administered areas. This includes allowing freedom of movement in central Rakhine and Paletwa. However, considering the past actions of AA towards the Rohingya, and accusations of atrocities, the Rohingya community remains split in regards to the ULA's efforts. To address issues within the Muslim community living in ULA-controlled areas, the APRG set up a Muslim Affairs Council and an advisory body in Maungdaw District. The advisory body, which the locals refer to as a "jury," is headed by a Rohingya official, U Bassel. U Bassel claims that there is no major ethnic conflict in Buthidaung and Maungdaw after AA took control.

During the 2025 Eid al-Adha, the ULA repealed a 5% tax on donated Qurbani animals. After having villages submit reports with the number of animals and the names of donors, the animals were donated to Rohingya, Kamein, and other Muslim communities. in Maungdaw Township, Buthidaung Township, Kyauktaw Township, Mrauk-U Township, Minbya Township, Pauktaw Township, and Rathedaung Township. 50 sacks of rice were also distributed to each village.

According to The Irrawaddy, there are at least 5,000 Muslims in the ULA/AA civil service, including ward and village administrators in Maungdaw and Buthidaung alone.

On 30 August 2025, Twan Mrat Naing visited the Maungdaw Myoma Mosque with Muslim community leaders. The mosque was eventually reopened on 12 September 2025.

=== Martial law ===
In March 2025, the ULA revealed a "National Defense Emergency Provision" where military-age men and women would be chosen for conscription, and those who are not severely ill are prevented from leaving AA-controlled areas of Rakhine State. Traders are also not allowed to bring "extra people."
