= Rakhine =

Rakhine (/rəˈkaɪn/) may refer to:

- Rakhine State, in Myanmar
- Rakhine people, a Tibeto-Burman ethnic group
- Rakhine language, a Sino-Tibetan language spoken by the Rakhine people
- Arakan Army or Rakhine Army, an ethno-nationalist armed organisation based in Rakhine State

== See also ==
- Arakan (disambiguation)
- Arakanese (disambiguation)
