= Nyo Twan Awng =

Arakanese rebel vice commander (born 1981)

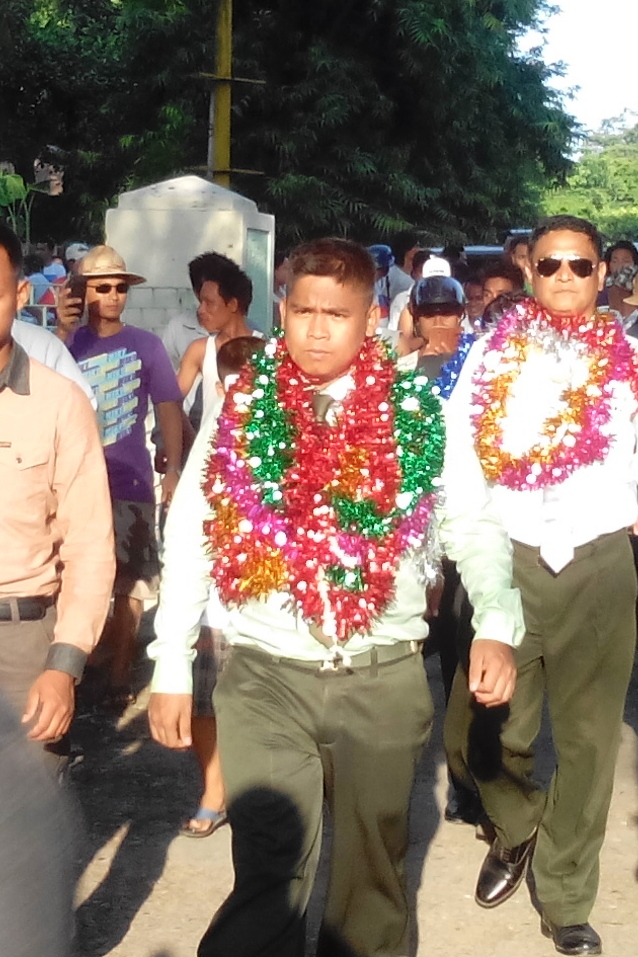
- Nyo Twan Awng in 2014
- Native name: ညိုထွန်းအောင်
- Born: Zaw Myo Thet; March 4, 1981 (age 45); Kyaukpyu, Rakhine State
- Allegiance: Arakha Army
- Branch: Arakha Army
- Service years: 2009–present
- Rank: Brigadier General
- Commands: Vice Commander-in-Chief of the Arakan Army
- Conflicts: Internal conflict in Myanmar
- Website: www.drnyotwanawng.com

Brig. Gen. Nyo Twan Awng (Burmese: ညိုထွန်းအောင်; also spelled Nyo Tun Aung, born Zaw Myo Thet on 4 March 1981) is the deputy leader of the United League of Arakan and the Vice Commander-in-Chief of the Arakha Army.

== Biography ==
Nyo Twan Awng was born Zaw Myo Thet on 4 March 1981 in Kyaukpyu, Rakhine State, Myanmar. He attended and studied Medical Science M.B., B.S course in University of Medicine 2, Yangon from 1999 to 2008. In 2009, the Arakan Army was founded and Nyo became one of its first members, attending the group's first training session. In 2009, during his House Surgeon Internship Training in Thingangyun Sanpya General Hospital, Yangon, he was under surveillance by စအဖ Sa Ah Pha (Special Intelligent Police Force) of Myanmar Police Force because of his underground UG activities in political movements. So, He tried to escape from Special Police Force's detaining and later reached to Northern Myanmar KIA Kachin Independent Army controlled Region where he cofounded Arakan Army together with Major General Twan Mrat Naing.

He characterised his group's January 4 independence day attack on four police stations as a defensive action in response to a build-up of Tatmadaw forces in northern Rakhine State. He also pointed to the Tatmadaw's announcement on December 21, 2018, that it was suspending operations in five regional commands in northern Myanmar until April 30 as further evidence of an imminent campaign. However, the Tatmadaw extended to two and half months until the Ta'ang National Liberation Army (TNLA) and other Northern Alliance groups launched coordinated attacked on the Defence Services Technological Academy in Pyin Oo Lwin on August 15, which promoted the Tatmadaw retaliate.

In June 2018, Nyo attended the second Panglong Conference in Naypyidaw, meeting with government officials to discuss the peace process for the decade-long conflict in the country.

== Awards and honors ==
- Medal of Honor (AA)
- Medal of Freedom and National Human Settlement
- University of Dagon Medical Award (1999)
