= Ponnagyun Township =

Coordinates: 20.3333°N 93.1833°E

Ponnagyun Township ပုဏ္ဏားကျွန်းမြို့နယ်
- Township
- Location in Sittwe district
- Country: Burma
- State: Rakhine State
- District: Sittwe District

Population
  - Ethnicities: Rakhine
- Time zone: UTC+6:30 (MST)

Ponnagyun Township (Burmese: ပုဏ္ဏားကျွန်းမြို့နယ်), formally known as Urittaung is a township of Sittwe District in the Rakhine State of Myanmar. The principal town is Ponnagyun. There are 94 village groups and about 200 villages in this township. It has an ancient pagoda Uritetawdat Zaydhi which was innovated by King Min Phalaung (1571–1593) of the Mrauk Oo Dynasty. It is 25 miles distance to the south Sittwe, the district capital.

== History ==
Ponnagyun is a small town of Sittwe District in Arakan. It was formerly known as Urittaung City and it was suited in other side of present town of Ponnagyun closed to the bank of Kaladan river below to Sri Gututta Hill. The Urittaung city was the headquarters of the Arakan Navy in the 15th to 18th century Mrauk-Oo era. Arakan Kings controlled the Bay of Bengal and some parts of current Bangladesh by the power of Arakan Navy.

== Demography ==
=== Ethnic group ===
Ethnic groups includes Rakhine, with Burmese and Hindu minorities.

== Economy ==
Ponnagyun Township doesn't have big market. People are depending on Capital City, Sittwe. 30% of people are government staff.

== Transport ==
Ponnagyun is located on the Yangon-Sittwe Main Road. The town pends on Road Transport. It is located close to the Gisspanadi River.

== Education ==
There are five high schools in Ponnagyun township.

- BEHS, Ponnagyun
- BEHS, Alechaung
- BEHS, Yotayaut
