= Minbya =

Minbya မင်းပြား
- Town
- Minbya
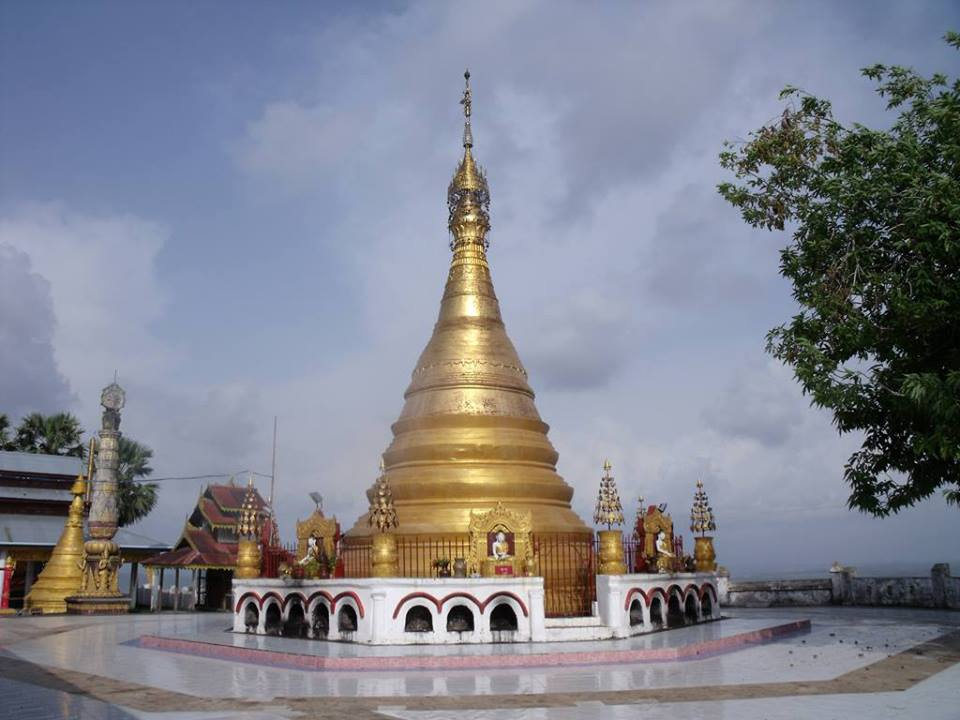
- Minbya Kyein Taung Pagoda

- Location in Myanmar (Burma)
- Coordinates: 20°21′44″N 93°16′24″E
- Country: Myanmar
- Division: Rakhine State
- District: Mrauk-U District
- Township: Minbya Township
- Founded: 1867

Population (2014 Census)
  - Total: 22,944
  - Ethnicities: Rakhine
  - Religions: Buddhism
- Time zone: UTC+6.30 (MMT)
- Area codes: 42, 43

Minbya (Burmese: မင်းပြားမြို့, pronounced [mɪ́ɰ̃bjá mjo̰], also spelled Mongbra after the Arakanese pronunciation) is a town in Rakhine State, in the westernmost part of Myanmar (Burma). It is located along the Lemro River and foothill of Kyein Range.

On 28 July 2026, the United League of Arakan renamed the town to Anjanapura (Rakhine: အဉ္ဇနပူရ), meaning "city of Añjanā" in Pali.

== History ==
Minbya was established by the British in 1867 on the western bank of Lemro River. It sits below Kyein Hill, on which stands Kyein Stupa, built during ancient times.

The Sittwe-Yangon highway passes near Minbya.

During the civil war in Myanmar, Minbya was a center of heavy fighting between the Tatmadaw and the Arakan Army. The entirety of Minbya township was captured by the AA on 6 February 2024.

== Education ==
There are three high schools in Minbya: BEHS 1,2,3 which are the main academic bodies of town. Many primary and middle schools persist. Before 2014, there were no courses for English Language study and computer training. In 2014, Buddhist monks who were also scholars at various universities of India opened a center for young students called The Light Of Mizzima. The center offers computer and English courses for one year and provides scholarships for outstanding students.

== Natural disasters ==
On 15 June 2010, strong rains destroyed more than 25 buildings, including houses, school buildings, and a mosque. Close to 200 people were housed in mosques of several nearby villages.

On 12 November 2011, all 567 permanent shops of the Minbya central market were destroyed in a fire accident.

During the last weekend of July 2015, there was a heavy rain and cause the flooding and then this situation was worse as Cyclone Komen hit the Arakan Coastal on 30 July. It caused great damages in urban and rural area. Many farms were destroyed. After flooding, many civil charity group were came to aid the rural residents. This flooding was also taking place in Mrauk-Oo, Kyauk Taw townships.

== Gallery ==
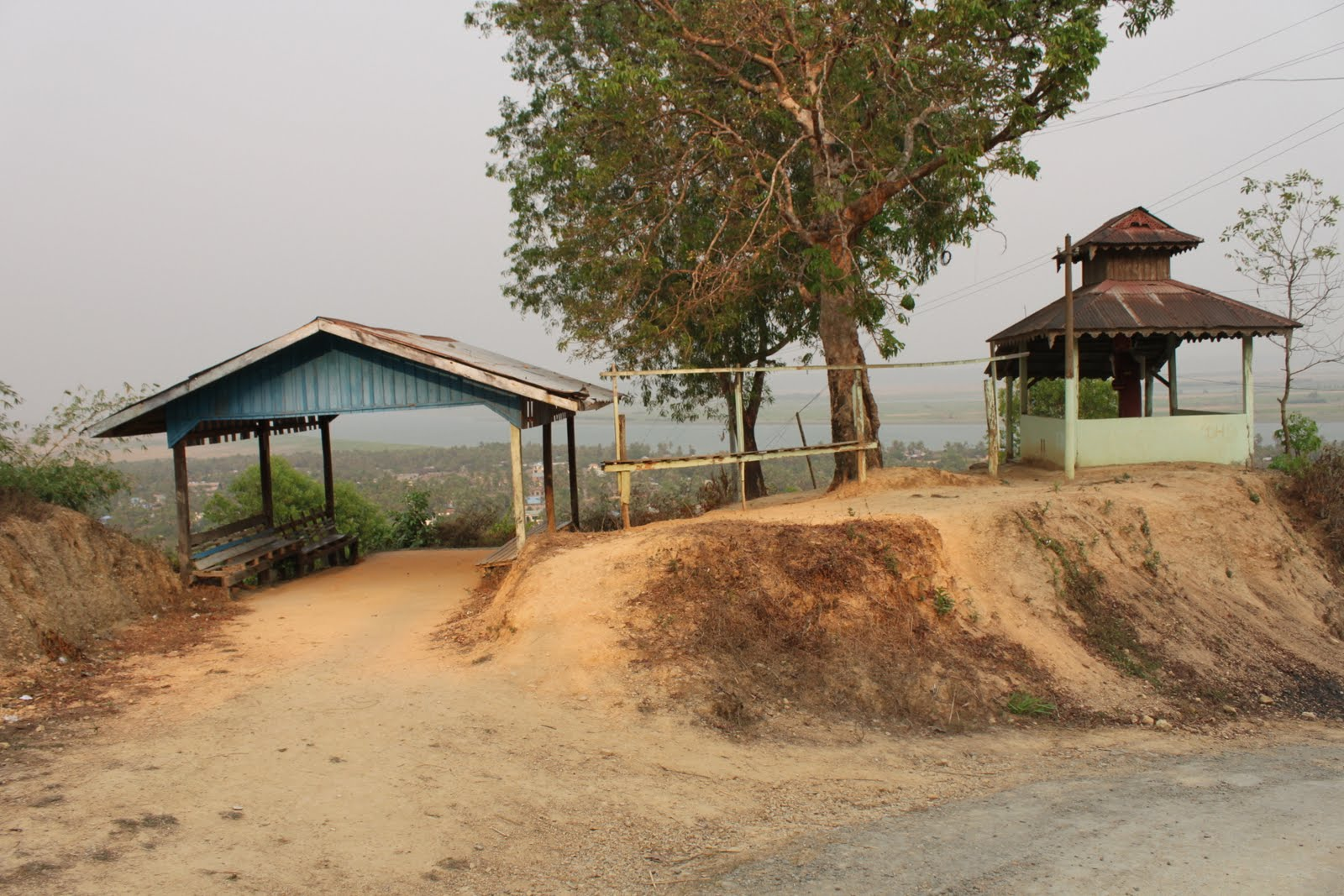

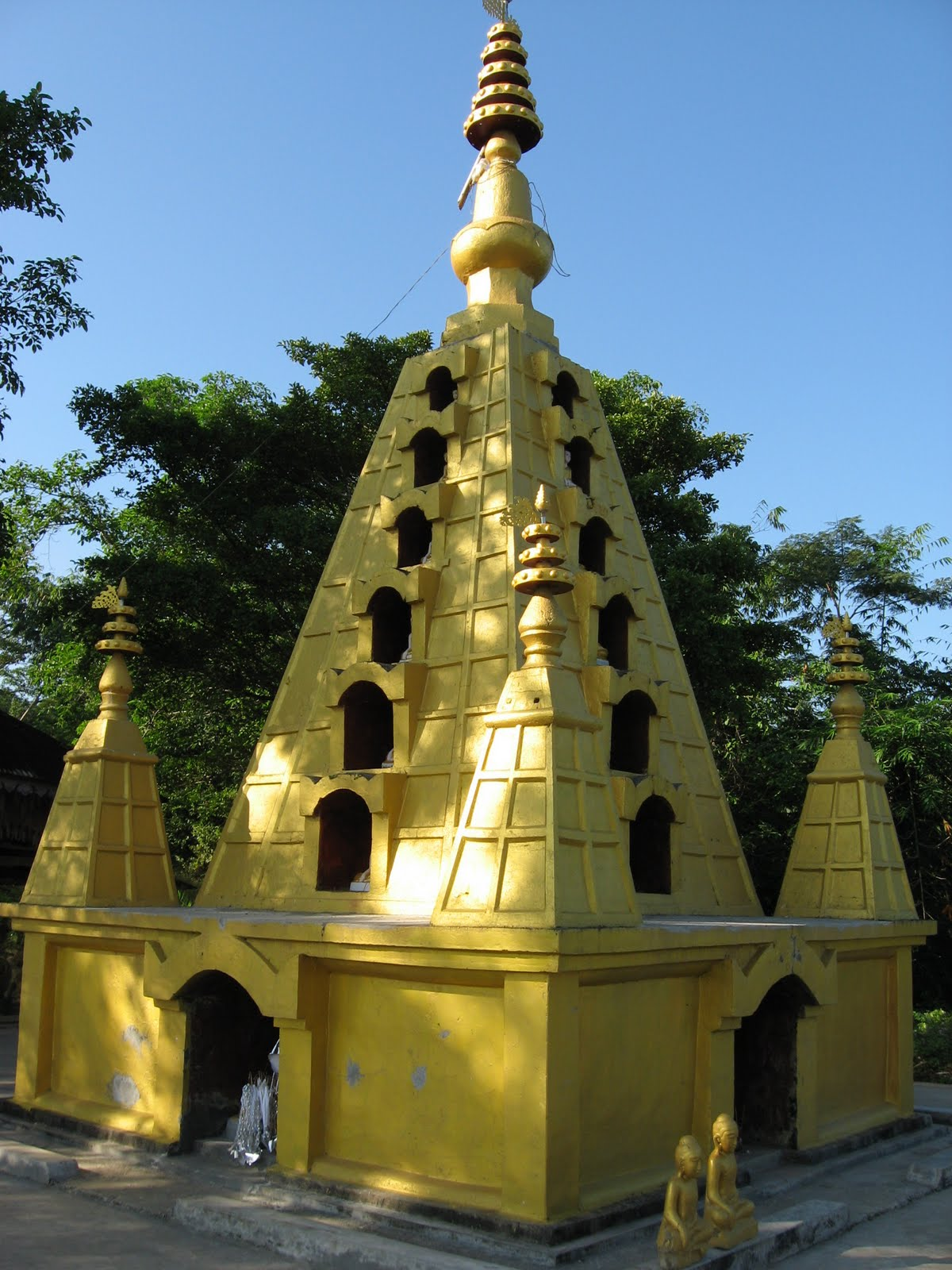

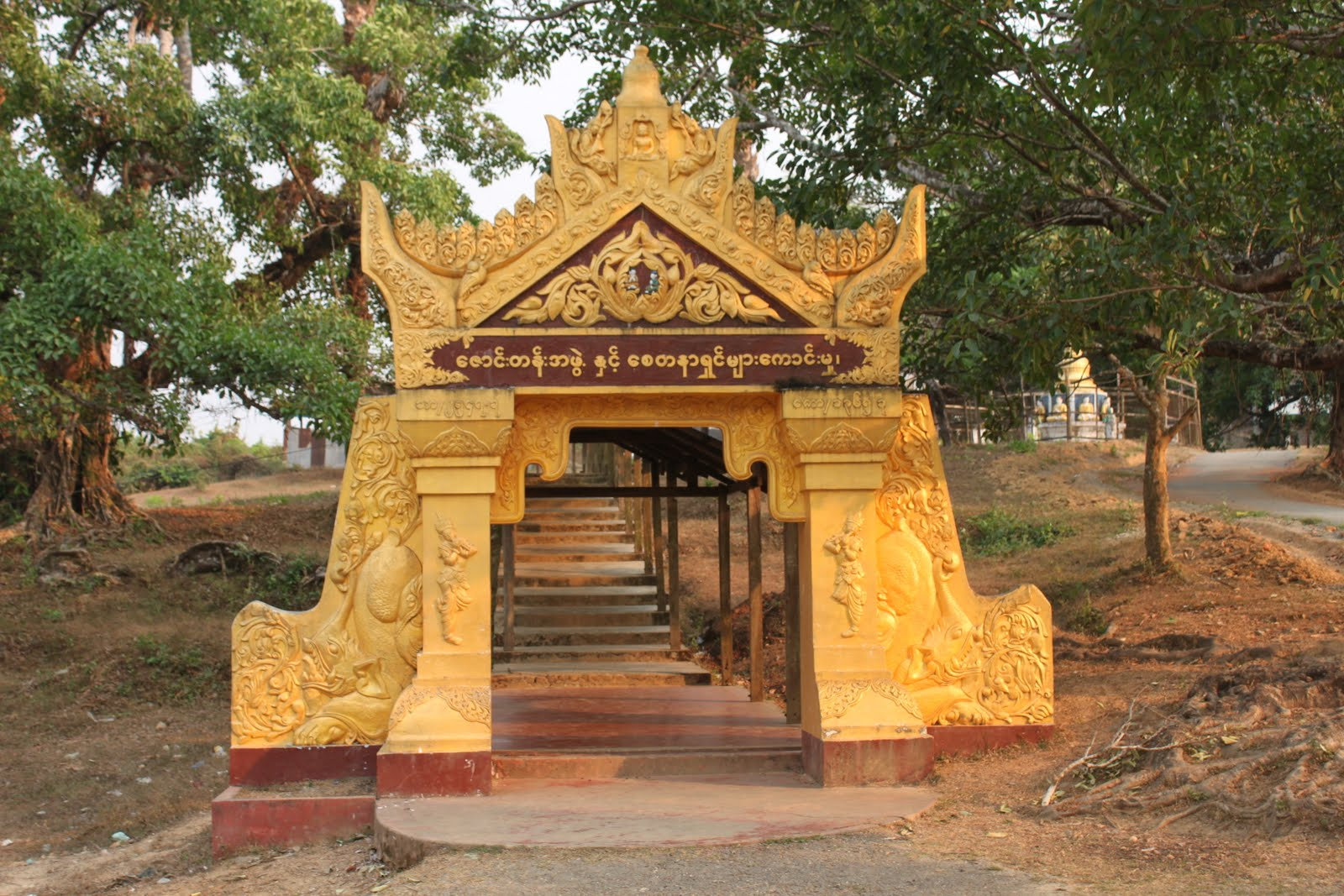

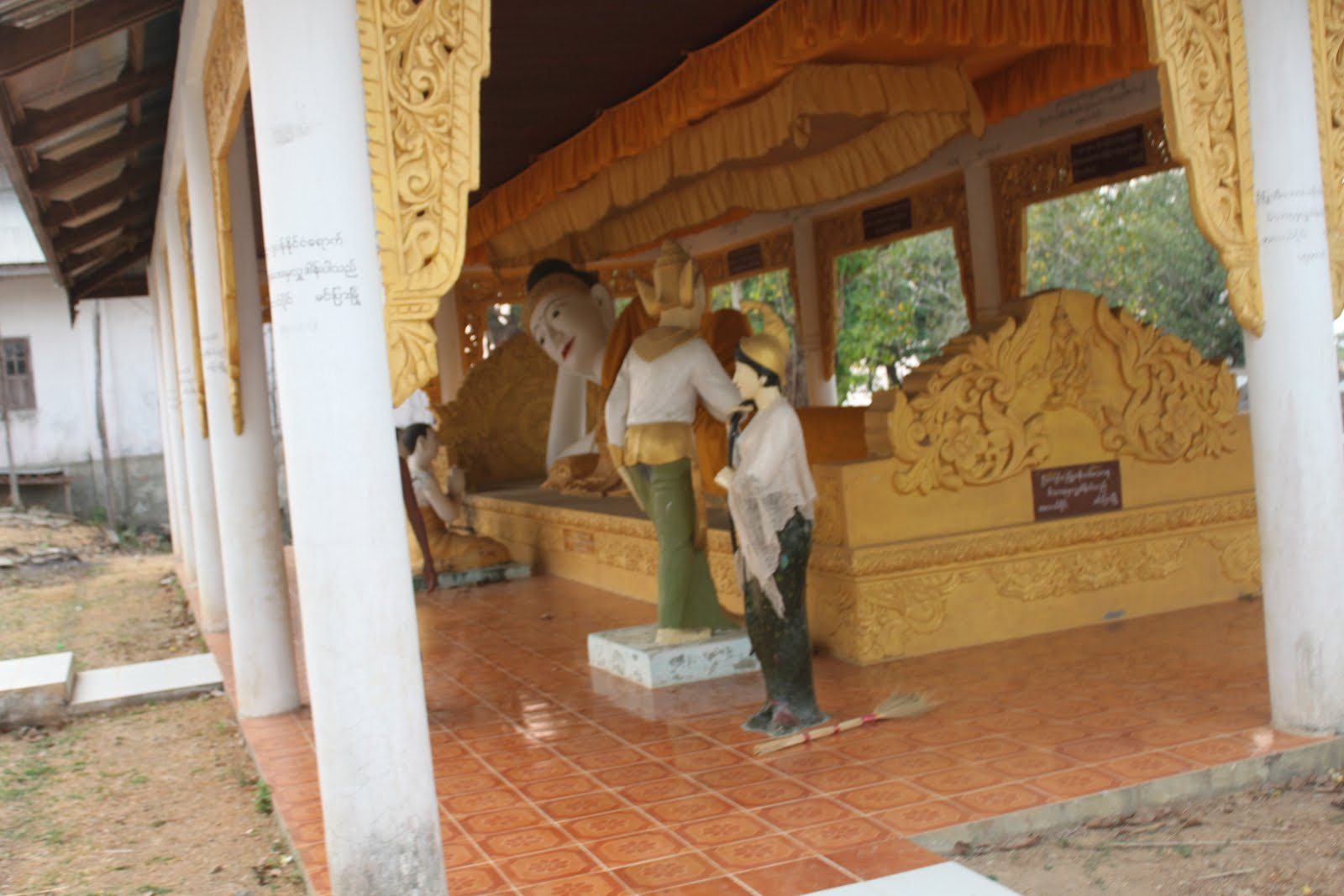

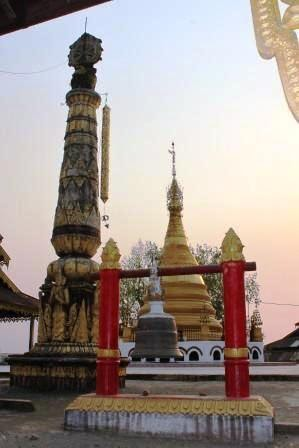
