= National United Party of Arakan =

Opposition group in Rakhine State, Myanmar

- ရခိုင်အမျိုးသားညီညွတ်ရေးပါတီ
- Flag of the National United Party of Arakan
- Dates active: 1994 –2020
- Headquarters: Sittwe, Rakhine State
- Active regions: Rakhine State
- Ideology: Rakhine nationalism Anti-authoritarianism; Secularism

The National United Party of Arakan (Burmese: ရခိုင်အမျိုးသားညီညွတ်ရေးပါတီ; NUPA) was a political organisation and insurgent group in Rakhine State, Myanmar. It was formed in 1994 as a merger between four nationalist groups, including a faction of the Communist Party of Arakan. Its armed wing was the Arakan Army.

As opposed to the anti-Rohingya Arakan Liberation Army, NUPA/AA was more cordial with the Rohingya and even formed the Arakan Independence Alliance with the Arakan Rohingya National Organisation.

Bangladesh authorities accused NUPA of conducting criminal activities in Chittagong Division.

In 1998, NUPA and Karen National Union leaders were arrested on Landfall Island, India. On February 11, 1998, during Operation Leech, six of their leaders, including Major General Khaing Raza, were killed by the Indian Navy. They were imprisoned in 2010 for allegedly smuggling weapons to Northeast Indian insurgents. On 6 December 2020, NUPA merged with the United League of Arakan.
