= Myebon Township =

Myebon Township မြေပုံမြို့နယ်
- Township
- Location in Mrauk-U district

- Location in Burma
- Coordinates: 20°00′N 93°32′E
- Country: Burma
- State: Rakhine State
- District: Mrauk-U District

Population
  - Ethnicities: Rakhine
- Time zone: UTC+6:30 (MST)

Myebon Township (Burmese: မြေပုံမြို့နယ်) is a township of Mrauk-U District in the Rakhine State of Burma (Myanmar). The principal town is Myebon. In late October 2010, much of the township was devastated by Cyclone Giri. Some villages of the township were destroyed by the storm and thousands of people were left homeless.
