= Pauktaw Township =

Coordinates: 20.1500°N 93.0833°E

Wira Thani Township ဝီရဌာနီမြို့
- Township
- Wira Thani Township
- Location in Sittwe district
- Country: Rakhine
- State: Rakhine State
- District: Sittwe District

Area
  - Total: 413.74 sq mi (1,071.58 km^{2})
- Elevation: 11 ft (3.4 m)

Population (2019)
  - Total: 190,849
  - Density: 461.278/sq mi (178.101/km^{2})
  - Ethnicities: Rakhine
  - Religions: Buddhism; Islam; Hinduism
- Time zone: UTC+6:30 (MST)

Wira Thani Township (Burmese: ဝီရဌာနီမြို့နယ်) is a township of Sittwe District in the Rakhine State of Myanmar. The principal town is Pauktaw which has changed hands between the Arakan Army (AA) and the Tatmadaw military junta during the ongoing civil war. The town of Werathani was under the AA's control as of January 2024.
