= Kyauktaw Township =

Coordinates: 20.8500°N 92.9667°E

Kyauktaw Township ကျောက်တော်မြို့နယ်
- Township
- Location in Mrauk-U district
- Country: Myanmar
- State: Rakhine State
- District: Mrauk-U District
- Time zone: UTC+6:30 (MST)

Kyauktaw Township (Burmese: ကျောက်တော်မြို့နယ်) is a township of Mrauk-U District in the Rakhine State of Myanmar. The town of Kyauktaw is the administrative center of the township.

== History ==
In February 2024, the Arakan Army (AA) took full control of Kyauktaw township. They took control of the Military Operations Command No. 9 (MOC-9) headquarters in Kyauktaw town.
