= Sittwe Township =

Coordinates: 20.1500°N 92.9000°E

Sittwe Township စစ်တွေမြို့နယ်
- Township
- Location in Sittwe district
- Country: Myanmar
- State: Rakhine State
- District: Sittwe District

Area
  - Total: 89.4 sq mi (231.6 km^{2})

Population (2019)
  - Total: 500,000
  - Density: 5,600/sq mi (2,200/km^{2})
  - Ethnicities: Rohingya (Note: Officially recorded in censuses as "Bengalis" or "Other".); Rakhine; Chin
  - Religions: Islam; Buddhism; Christianity
- Time zone: UTC+6:30 (MMT)

Sittwe Township (Burmese: စစ်တွေမြို့နယ်) is a township of Sittwe District in the Rakhine State of Myanmar. The principal town is Sittwe.

== Demographics ==
Historical Population
Year	Pop.	±%
1973		—
1983		—
2014	150,735	—
2018	230,298	+52.8%
2019	318,514	+38.3%
2023	500,000	+57.0%
Source: Ministry of Labor, Immigration, and Population and General Administration Department data

The 2014 Myanmar Census reported that Sittwe Township had an estimated population of 150,735. The population density was 1,289.5 people per km^{2}. The census reported that the median age was 26.8 years, with 91 males per 100 females. There were 29,036 households; the mean household size was 4.8.

The 2019 General Administration Department report recorded a massive increase in the population during 2018 and 2019. As of 2019, it counted 318,514 residents, 170,355 of whom were Rohingyas (officially counted as Bengalis), making them the majority ethnic group in the township. Accordingly, Islam is the majority religion in the township making it one of few townships in Myanmar where Buddhism is not the majority religion.

Administrative records released by the military council in 2023 reported that the population of Sittwe Township had exceeded 500,000. It also stated that the township spans 231.6 square kilometres and includes 34 urban wards and 23,150 households.
