= Burma News International =

News agency in Myanmar

Burma News International (BNI)
- Industry: News agency
- Founded: 2003; 23 years ago
- Headquarters: Myanmar
- Area served: Myanmar
- Key people: Tin Tin Nyo (managing director)
- Members: 15
- Website: bnionline.net

Burma News International (Burmese: နိုင်ငံတကာမြန်မာ့သတင်း, BNI) is a news coalition based in Myanmar (Burma). BNI aggregates and publishes bilingual Burmese and English news content from affiliated news agencies on its online portal. BNI's inclusive representation among the country's ethnic minorities, including the Chin, Karenni, Mon, Rakhine, Rohingya, and Shan, has broadened the depth of news coverage of issues impacting Myanmar's rural areas and border regions.

== History ==
BNI was launched in 2003 by four independent news agencies based in western Myanmar, near the borders with Bangladesh and India. Over the years, its membership has expanded to include news agencies operating near Myanmar's border with Thailand.

In 2008, in the lead-up to the 2008 Myanmar constitutional referendum, BNI launched a pioneering nationwide survey assessing the Burmese public's sentiment toward the military-drafted 2008 Constitution of Myanmar in 13 of the country's 14 divisions.

Since 2013, it has run the Myanmar Peace Monitor project, which tracks progress and key stakeholders toward peace and reconciliation in the country.

== Members ==
BNI appoints a 'duty editor' from among its member journalists to check stories posted by member agencies, write editorials, and oversee BNI's weekly news package. As of March 2023, BNI has fifteen affiliated members, including:

1. Chin World
2. Development Media Group
3. Independent Mon News Agency (IMNA)
4. Kachin News Group
5. Kaladan Press Network
6. Kantarawaddy Times
7. Karen Information Center,
8. Khonumthung News Group
9. Mizzima News
10. Myitkyina Journal
11. Narinjara News
12. Network Media Group
13. Shan Herald Agency for News (SHAN)
14. Than Lwin Times
15. The Voice of Shan Ni

== See also ==
- Myanmar Now
- Mizzima
- The Irrawaddy
