= Twan Mrat Naing =

Commander-in-chief of the Arakan Army

- ထွန်းမြတ်နိုင်
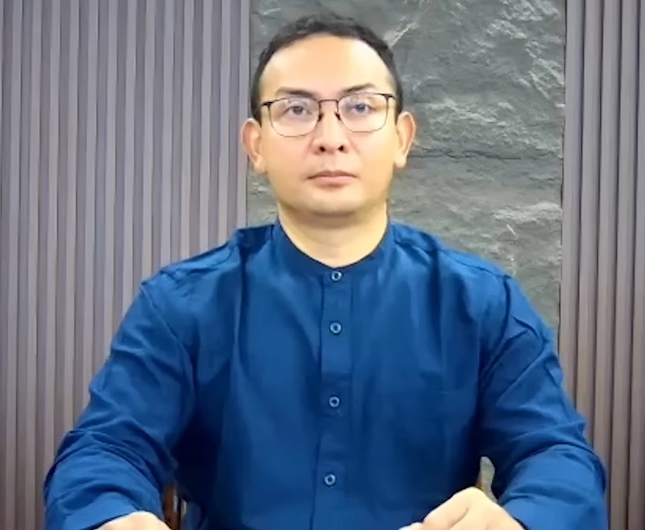
- General Twan Mrat Naing during an interview with Voice of America in 2024
- Born: 7 November 1978 (age 48); Akyab, Arakan State, Burma
- Spouse: Hnin Zar Phyu (2005- present)
- Military career
- Allegiance: Arakan Army
- Branch: Arakan Army
- Service years: 2009–present
- Rank: Major General
- Commands: Commander-in-Chief, Arakan Army
- Conflicts: Internal conflict in Myanmar

Major General Twan Mrat Naing (Burmese: ထွန်းမြတ်နိုင်; also spelled Tun Myat Naing) is an Arakanese revolutionary and commander in chief of the Arakan Army, an ethnic armed organization based in Myanmar's Rakhine State (formerly Arakan).

Twan Mrat Naing has led the Arakan Army since its founding in 2009, and maintains the rank of Major General. Twan Mrat Naing is of Rakhine descent and commanded the Army from Laiza, Kachin State, where the Arakan Army's "temporary headquarters" were. After the Arakan Army occupied 70% of the Rakhine State, he returned to his homeland in June 2025.

== Early life ==
Twan Mrat Naing was born in Akyab (now Sittwe), the state capital of Rakhine State, on 7 November 1978. He began law studies in Sittwe, but did not complete the course. He was active as a student leader and had a confrontation with the military while in grade 9.

== Career ==
He previously worked as a tour guide in Yangon. In 1998, he planned to join the National United Party of Arakan but their general was killed in action.

He began crossing the border into Bangladesh in the late 1990s. His first crossing was in 1998, following the death of several Arakan revolutionaries during Operation Leech. Until 2006, he worked toward the idea of unifying various Rakhine groups. By 2006, he traveled to India by crossing the borders into Manipur, where he stayed in Imphal, Guwahati, Assam and Delhi. He interacted with several leaders and attended the meeting of Arakan National Congress in Vikaspuri. Afterwards, he began considering building connections with the Kachin Independence Army (KIA) and other organizations in Myanmar. Through contacts at Yangon University, he succeeded in establishing links with the Karen National Liberation Army.

In 2004, he collaborated with Nyo Twan Awng, a surgeon doctor who is currently a Vice Commander in-Chief of Arakha Army. In 2009, they founded the Arakan Army. The group began in Kachin and found support from the Kachin Independence Army.

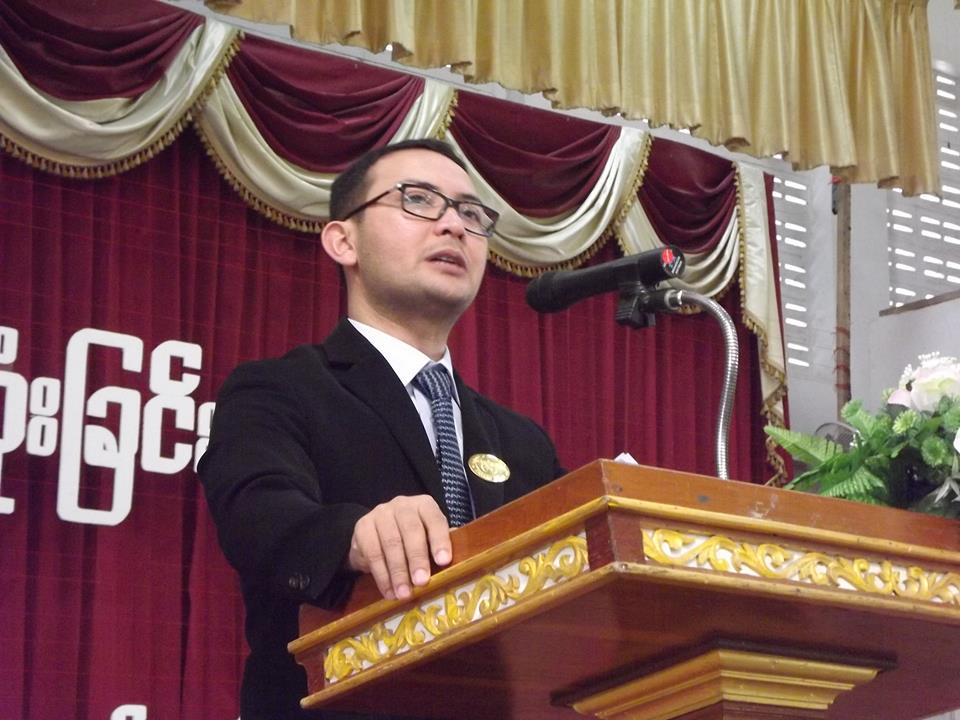
Twan Mrat Naing giving a speech in 2016

In June 2022, military spokespeople from the State Administration Council said that provocative rhetoric from Twan Mrat Naing, as the leader of the Arakan Army was inviting conflict. The informal ceasefire between AA and the junta would breakdown after an junta airstrike on an AA base in Kayin State.

In September 2024, he declared that Rakhine State will be governed under a unitary state system.

In September 2025, he met with Kim Aris, son of Daw Aung San Suu Kyi, where he expressed deep respect for her and concern for her recent health. Kim Aris honored the resilience of the Rakhine people and their achievements.

== Views ==
Twan Mrat Naing has stated that Rakhine State would be established as a confederated region where the Rakhine people have the right to decide for themselves and create their own destiny.

== War crime allegations ==
According to activists such as Nay San Lwin and organizations such as Human Rights Watch, the Arakan Army allegedly committed multiple war crimes against the Rohingya people. The Burmese Rohingya Organisation of the United Kingdom requested a federal court in Buenos Aires, Argentina to issue arrest warrants against Twan Mrat Naing and Nyo Twan Awng on 3 September 2025.

Twan Mrat Naing has denied allegations that he ordered war crimes against the Rohingya and other Muslim populations in Rakhine State. He claimed that fighters who commit war crimes are seriously dealt with once credible evidence is revealed. He further dismissed allegations of human rights violations against minorities by AA as "accusations [that benefit the narratives of particular groups, especially diaspora activists, who weaponize human rights]."

== Personal life ==
Twan Mrat Naing is married to Hnun Zar Phru (Hnin Zar Phyu in Burmese). The couple has two children, a daughter, Saw Prae Shun, and a son, Mrat Lurn Zan. Twan Mrat Naing's father-in-law is San Kyaw Hla, the speaker of the Rakhine State Hluttaw and an Arakan National Party (ANP) politician.

=== Arrests of family members ===
On 10 July 2019, Aung Mrat Kyaw, Twan Mrat Naing's younger brother and five other Arakanese were detained by the Singaporean government and deported to Myanmar, where they were arrested shortly after arriving. Singapore's home ministry said the detained individuals had organized and mobilized some members of the Myanmar community in Singapore to support the Arakan Army, and its political wing, the United League of Arakan.

On 18 October 2019, the younger sister of Twan Mrat Naing, Moe Hnin Phyu and her husband, Kyaw Naing, were arrested at the Yangon International Airport after they returned from Chiang Mai, Thailand and are currently being questioned. They are accused of being connected to the seizure of explosive devices in Mandalay, according to Zaw Htay, the spokesperson of the State Counsellor's Office.

On 6 December 2019, Hnin Zar Phyu and her two children were detained by Thai immigration officials in Chiang Mai when she went there to extend her visa. The Chiang Mai office of the Thailand Immigration Bureau arrested her due to the presence of her name on the list of people affiliated with the Arakan Army, which was provided by the Myanmar government. On 25 February 2020, the detained family left for Switzerland under the political asylum initiated by the UNHCR.

On 9 June 2021, Aung Myat Kyaw, Moe Hnin Phyu and her husband were released from prison after all charges against them were dropped. The release happened after the Tatmadaw took power in a coup d'état earlier that year.

== See also ==
- Arakan Army
- Internal Conflict in Myanmar
