= Arakan Army =

Armed group in Rakhine State, Myanmar

- အာရက္ခတပ်တော်
- Founders: Twan Mrat Naing; Nyo Twan Awng; Kyaw Han
- Spokesperson: Khaing Thu Kha
- Dates active: 10 April 2009 – present
- Headquarters: Laiza, Kachin State (former); Rakhine State (current)
- Active regions: Ayeyarwaddy Region, Chinland, Kachin State, Magway Region, Rakhine State, Sagaing Region, Shan State, Bangladesh–Myanmar border, India–Myanmar border, China–Myanmar border
- Ideology: Arakanese nationalism; Ethnonationalism; Arakanese self-determination; Anti-Rohingya sentiment (denied); Confederalism
- Status: Active
- Size: 50,000+: 15,000+ in Chin and Rakhine State; ~1,500 in Kachin and Shan State (estimated in February 2024)
- Part of: United League of Arakan; Northern Alliance
- Wars: the internal conflict in Myanmar
- Flag

The Arakan Army (Rakhine: အာရက္ခတပ်တော်, romanized: Arakha Tatdaw; abbreviated AA), sometimes referred to as the Arakha Army (AA) is an ethnic-armed organisation based in Myanmar's Rakhine State (Arakan). Founded in April 2009, the Arakan Army is the military wing of the United League of Arakan (ULA). It is currently led by Commander-in-Chief Major General Twan Mrat Naing and vice deputy commander-in-chief Brigadier General Nyo Twan Awng. AA seeks a Rakhine State with greater autonomy from Myanmar's central government. It was declared a terrorist organization in 2020 by Myanmar, and again by the State Administration Council junta in 2024.

In the early 2010s, the Arakan Army fought alongside the Kachin Independence Army (KIA) against the Tatmadaw (Myanmar Armed Forces) in the Kachin conflict. Following the 2016 outbreak of conflict in Rakhine state, the AA became more heavily involved in the Arakan region. In 2019, the AA launched attacks on state security forces and the Myanmar Army responded, heightening clashes. The AA reached a ceasefire in late 2020 after eroding the central government's control in northern Rakhine. The power vacuum was filled by the AA over the next 18 months with state-building efforts, like their COVID-19 vaccine rollouts.

During the Myanmar civil war, the ceasefire broke down and armed clashes resumed in July 2022 after a Tatmadaw airstrike against an AA base. The two sides agreed to a temporary ceasefire in November 2022, reportedly for humanitarian reasons. This ceasefire lasted a year until November 2023, when AA launched a series of offensives coinciding with Operation 1027 that saw them rapidly take all of Mrauk-U District by 6 February 2024. They would continue to take towns, seizing Thandwe in July and Maungdaw in December 2024. The AA gained full control over the Myanmar-Bangladesh border in December 2024.

The armed group has been accused of committing war crimes and human rights abuses by human rights organizations, such as in the Hoyyar Siri massacre, against the Rohingya Muslim minority.

In June 2024, Twan Mrat Naing claimed that the AA strength had grown to at least 45,000 troops. Since early 2025, the Arakan Army is widely considered to be the most powerful armed group in Myanmar. It is the largest active non-state armed group in South and Southeast Asia, with estimated 40,000 regular troops. It has also become the patron of a network of other anti-junta armed groups.

== Origin ==
The Arakan Army was founded on 10 April 2009 along with its political wing, the United League of Arakan (ULA), in what it describes as its "temporary headquarters" in Laiza, Kachin State. According to Twan Mrat Naing, he and other founders of AA previously thought about joining either the Arakan Liberation Army or the National United Party of Arakan, but found these groups weakened. After a stint in India where they were left dissatisfied hearing "petty issues" from the leaders of the Arakan National Congress, they first established links with the Karen National Liberation Army and observed the KIA in 2006. The first batch of recruits for what would become AA was authorized in 2008.

Following training, the group planned to return to Arakan State and fight for self-determination; however, with the outbreak of fighting in Kachin State in June 2011, they were unable to. As a result, they took up arms against the Myanmar Army in support of the KIA. In 2014, the AA started a settlement in Rakhine State near the border with Bangladesh, and another near the border of Thai-Myanmar with which it has become much stronger and its combat abilities have been positively impacted.

In February 2015, the AA fought alongside the Myanmar Nationalities Democratic Alliance Army (MNDAA), an ethnic armed group, and its ally the Ta'ang National Liberation Army (TNLA) in their conflict with the Myanmar Army. Hundreds of the Tatmadaw's soldiers were reportedly killed in this conflict. Later in 2015 they became active against the government of Myanmar, in the Arakan region. On 20 August 2015, the Arakan Army clashed with a group of Border Guards Bangladesh (BGB), after ten of their horses were confiscated by the BGB earlier that day.

=== Naming ===
On 10 April 2024, AA announced it was changing its name from Rakhain Tatdaw (Rakhine: ရက္ခိုင့်တပ်တော်) to Arakha Tatdaw (Rakhine: အရက္ခတပ်တော်). Spokesperson U Khaing Thu Kha, claimed "Arakha" represents everyone living in Rakhine State, regardless of background. Even though they claim to be diverse, activists have brought forth evidence of war crimes against Rohingyas following this announcement. However, AA continues to use the English name "Arakan Army" on its social media channels.

== Objectives ==
The Arakan Army claims that they stand for self-determination for the multi-ethnic Arakanese population as well as the safeguarding and promotion of the national identity and cultural heritage of the Arakan people. It aims to establish an "Arakan Nation" through the "Way of Rakhita". In an interview with the Arakha Media (AKK) conducted in August 2021, the Commander-in-chief of the Arakan Army stated that the political objective of the armed revolution is to restore the sovereignty of the Arakan, and there had been no bargaining in the attempt to regain the lost sovereignty and there would not be in the future either.

General Twan Mrat Naing has declared that the AA aims to clear the Myanmar military from Rakhine State. His goal is to establish a confederate region where the Rakhine people have the right to self-determination and to shape their own destiny.

On 10 April 2024, the Arakan Army rebranded its Arakanese name from "Rakhine Army" (Rakhine: ရက္ခိုင့်တပ်တော်) to "Arakan Army" (Rakhine: အာရက္ခတပ်တော်) to represent all people of Rakhine State.

== Deployment ==
Most AA soldiers were originally trained at the KIA Military Academy. Since 2014, the AA has set up its own training camps in Rakhine State. According to the Myanmar Peace Monitor, the AA had more than 1,500 troops in 2014, including personnel stationed in the Rakhine State near Myanmar's border with Bangladesh. The Irrawaddy stated in September 2015 that the AA had more than 2,500 troops and 10,000 personnel in their civilian wing. In June 2020, the AA chief claimed that the group has more than 20,000 soldiers. In a December 2021 interview, Twan Mrat Naing claimed that the AA had grown to 30,000 troops.

Although the AA was initially trained by the KIA, it later aligned itself more with the United Wa State Army (UWSA) through the Federal Political Negotiation and Consultative Committee. In 2020, India accused China of assisting rebel groups, including the UWSA and AA, by supplying weapons and providing hideouts within Indian territory. AA has received Chinese-made weapons, such as surface-to-surface missiles used during an attack on the Myanmar Navy in 2019.

According to The Irrawaddy report, the Arakan Army is relatively independent and less reliant on China compared to other ethnic armed groups. The Arakan Army also grew its influent providing support ranging from training to ammunition to at least 23 armed groups, mostly in the regions bordering Rakhine state.

Arakan Army enforces conscription for all residents over 18 in Rakhine state. Men (18–45) will train for two months and serve two years, while women (18–35) must also serve. According to AA representatives, non-Arakanese groups such as the Bamar and Rohingya are officially exempt from conscription, but individuals can join voluntarily. Arakan Army troops reportedly includes members of other ethnic groups beyond from Myanmar with Bangladeshi citizens from Chakma, Marma, and Tanchangya community.

== Weaponry ==
Tank Destroyers (Assault Vehicle)
Name	Quantity	Origin	Image	Remark
WMA-301	Unknown	China		The Arakan Army seized or destroyed an unknown number of WMA-301 Tank Destroyers from the Myanmar Army. Some of the seized vehicles have been seen being used against the Myanmar Army.

Armoured Vehicle
Name	Quantity	Origin	Image	Remark
MT-LB	Unknown	Ukraine	MT-LBM (izdeliye 6MB5) - MAKS 2007	Three Brotherhood Alliance captured 2 MT-LbMSh vehicles during the siege of Muse-105 mile outpost.

Artillery Systems
Name	Quantity	Origin	Image	Remark
M101 howitzer	Unknown	United States		105 mm M2A1. Used during the siege of Western Command of the Myanmar Army.
M-56	Unknown	Yugoslavia		105 mm M56. Used during the siege of No.5 Border Guard Police Battalion in Maung Daw.
D-30M	Unknown	Soviet Union		An unknown number of D-30M Howitzers were seized during the Paletwa and Kyauktaw Battles.

Arms

Name	Quantity	Origin	Image	Reference
Type 81 UWSA-variants	10000+	UWSA		
KO-10	10000+	KIA		
KA2-5	10000+	KIA		
G3 rifle	Unknown	Germany		Captured from Myanmar Army.
MA-series rifles	Unknown	Myanmar		Captured from Myanmar Army.
MG 3 machine gun	Unknown	Germany		Captured from Myanmar Army.

Anti-Aircraft System

Name	Quantity	Origin	Image	Reference
Bofors 40 mm Automatic Gun L/70	Unknown	Sweden		Ethnic armed group claims capture of key western Myanmar border.

== Armed conflict ==
=== Early clashes (2015–2018) ===
In April 2015, the AA clashed with the Myanmar Army in Kyauktaw Township of Rakhine State and Paletwa Township of Chin State.

On 14 July 2015, Border Guard Bangladesh (BGB) rescued two Myanmar soldiers who had been captured by the Arakan Army.

On 25 August 2015, a BGB patrol seized ten horses from members of the Arakan Army, who were using the animals to transport supplies. Later that day, at 09:30 am local time, the Arakan Army fired on a ten-member BGB team patrolling in the Baramadak area near the Sangu River and the village of Boro Modok in Thanchi, Bangladesh. The exchange of gunfire lasted five hours. Nayek Jakir Hossain of the Barakadam BOP was wounded during the gunfight. He was rescued from the area and was sent to the Combined Military Hospital in Chittagong via helicopter. The Arakan Army lost two horses during the skirmish. According to locals sources, eight to twenty Arakan Army members were wounded. The BGB declared a state of emergency at the Bangladesh–Myanmar border in response to the incident and sent one BGB unit, two Bangladesh Army units, and one F-7 of the Bangladesh Air Force as reinforcements to the area to conduct a coordinated operation against the Arakan Army. Upon request from the Bangladeshi government, the Myanmar government sealed off their side of the border. Bangladeshi forces later arrested a Burmese citizen and accomplice of the Arakan Army, Ong Owong Rakhain, in Rajasthali Upazila. He had Arakan Army uniforms, laptops, digital cameras, motorcycles and two horses in his possession. Two more people were arrested in the following days.

In December 2015, the Tatmadaw and the Arakan Army engaged in several days of fighting around 60 kilometres (37 mi) north of Sittwe at the border between Kyauktaw and Mrauk U townships. An unknown number of military personnel were killed in the fighting. Several Tatmadaw personnel, including one commanding officer, were killed in sniper attacks. Many others were injured.

Following clashes between Rohingya insurgents and Burmese security forces in northern Rakhine State in October 2016, the Arakan Army released a press statement calling the perpetrators (the Arakan Rohingya Salvation Army) "savage Bengali Muslim terrorists" and the violence a "rampage of the Bengali Islamic fundamentalist militants in northern Arakan."

In November 2017, the Arakan Army was involved in heavy clashes with the Tatmadaw in Chin State, in which 11 Tatmadaw soldiers were killed. According to the BBC, there was popular support for the Arakan Army in Mrauk U and a number of men from the town recently joined the group.

On 21 December 2018, the Myanmar Army declared a four-month unilateral ceasefire in five conflict areas, saying it would hold talks with non-signatories of the Nationwide Ceasefire Agreement (NCA) during the ceasefire period. However, the Western Command (stationed in Chin State and Rakhine State) was notably excluded from the unilateral ceasefire announcement and an increase in clashes between the Tatmadaw and the Arakan Army was reported.

=== 2019–2020 war with the Tatmadaw ===
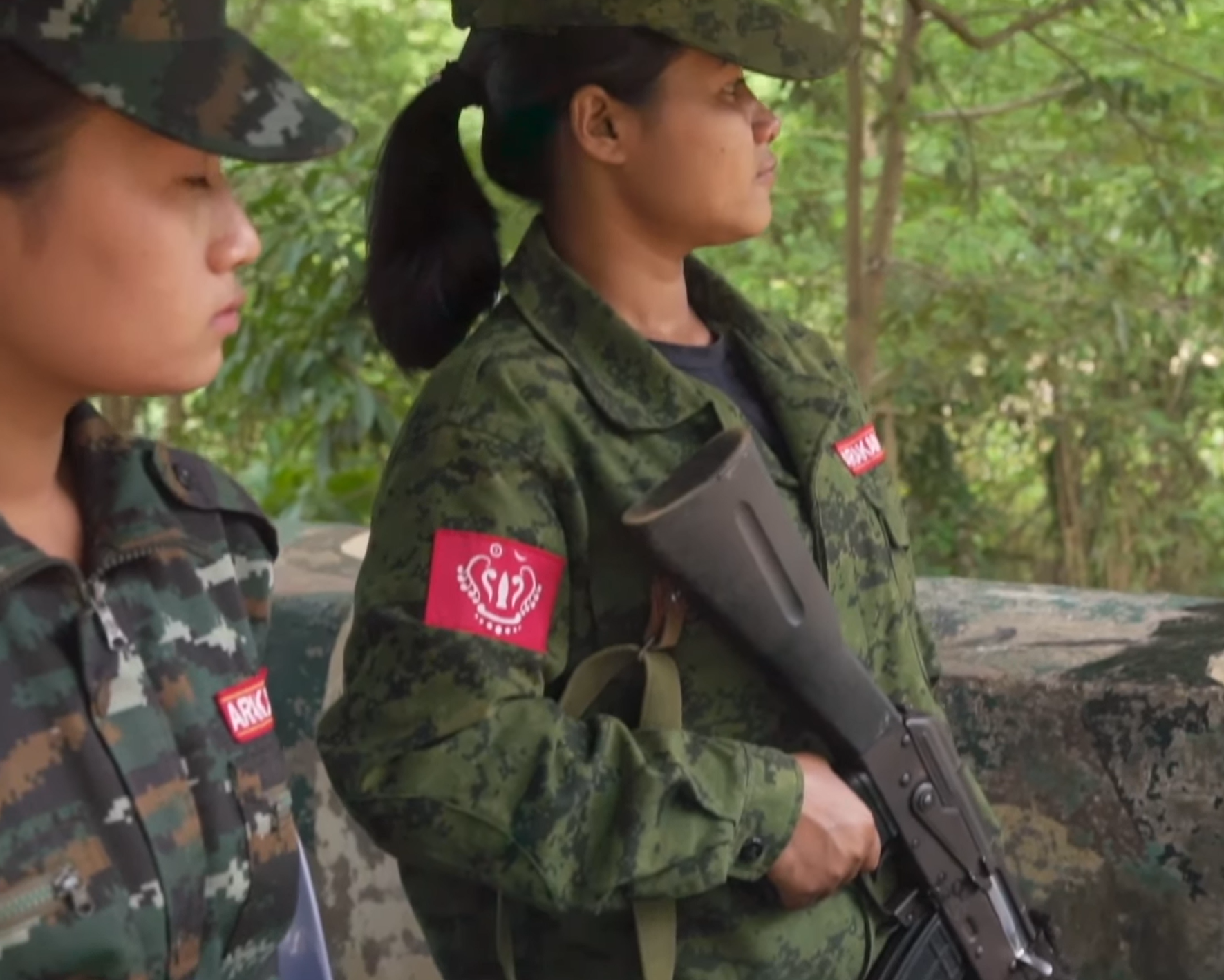
Female Arakan Army fighters in uniform around 2019

On 4 January 2019, around 300 members of the Arakan Army launched pre-dawn attacks on four border police outposts—Kyaung Taung, Nga Myin Taw, Ka Htee La and Kone Myint—in northern Buthidaung Township. Thirteen members of the Border Guard Police (BGP) were killed and nine others were injured, whilst 40 firearms and more than 10,000 rounds of ammunition were taken by the Arakan Army. The Arakan Army later stated that it had captured nine BGP personnel and five civilians, and that three of its fighters were also killed in the attacks. Following the attacks, the Office of the President of Myanmar held a high-level meeting on national security in the capital Naypyidaw on 7 January 2019, and instructed the Defense Ministry to increase troop deployments in the areas that were attacked and to use aircraft if necessary.

Myanmar Army soldiers from the 22nd Light Infantry Division, elements of the 66th and 99th Light Infantry Divisions, and battalions from the Western Command of the Tatmadaw were reportedly involved in the subsequent military offensive against the Arakan Army. Clashes were reported in Maungdaw, Buthidaung, Kyauktaw, Rathedaung and Ponnagyun Townships, located in the northern and central parts of Rakhine State. The Rakhine State government issued a notice blocking non-governmental organisations and UN agencies, except for the International Committee of the Red Cross and the World Food Programme, from travelling to rural areas in these townships affected by the conflict. The fighting prompted 5,000 civilians to flee from their homes and to take shelter in monasteries and communal areas across the region, according to the UN Office for the Coordination of Humanitarian Affairs. Civilian casualties, arbitrary detention of ethnic Rakhine villagers, and military blockage of food aid and medical relief were also reported.

On 9 March 2019, around 60 AA insurgents launched an evening attack on Yoe-ta-yoke Police Station. According to a leaked combat report, nine policemen were killed, two were injured, and a dozen weapons, including 10 BA-63 battle rifles, were stolen by the attackers. On the same day, AA insurgents managed to conquer the front line commanding post of Rakhine State's Gwa Township-based No. 563 Light Infantry Battalion under the supervision of Light Infantry Division No. 5. According to a press release by the Arakan Army, 11 personnel, including four military engineers, were captured and 16 backhoe excavators, a car, a dump truck, and 60 mm and 80 mm mortars were confiscated. In April, around 200 AA insurgents attacked the No. 31 Police Security Unit at 10 p.m. The Tatmadaw retaliated with fighter jets, bombing AA positions until 6 a.m. the next day.

On 22 September, fighting broke out near Taunggyi Village in Myebon Township, as the ceasefire expired. In October, AA soldiers captured a ferry on the Mayu River between Sittwe and Buthidaung Township and abducted a group of 58 passengers, which included soldiers, police officers and government workers. A rescue attempt by the Tatmadaw using a helicopter resulted in an exchange of gunfire, killing several of the hostages.

On 6 February 2020, the Arakan Army attacked an outpost of the Tatmadaw on a bank of Kaladan River in Chin State. Fighting continued for weeks and peaked in the second week of March when the Arakan Army claimed it had captured 36 soldiers, including a battalion commander. On 19 March 2020, the Tatmadaw made a statement claiming that its forces could break the Arakan Army's siege of the outpost.

On 26 May 2020, the Arakan Army released a statement demanding the immediate withdrawal of Burmese Government administration and Burmese Armed Forces from Arakan. In January 2019, Myanmar's Anti-Terrorism Central Committee designated Arakan Army as a terrorist group under the country's counter-terrorism law.

AA and the central government reached a ceasefire in November 2020. At the time of the ceasefire, Myanmar's control had been severely eroded in central and northern Rakhine State, leaving a vacuum that the Arakan Army would fill out of the next 18 months. AA rolled out many public services, like COVID-19 vaccines and local administrators in northern Rakhine State.

=== Myanmar civil war (2021–present) ===
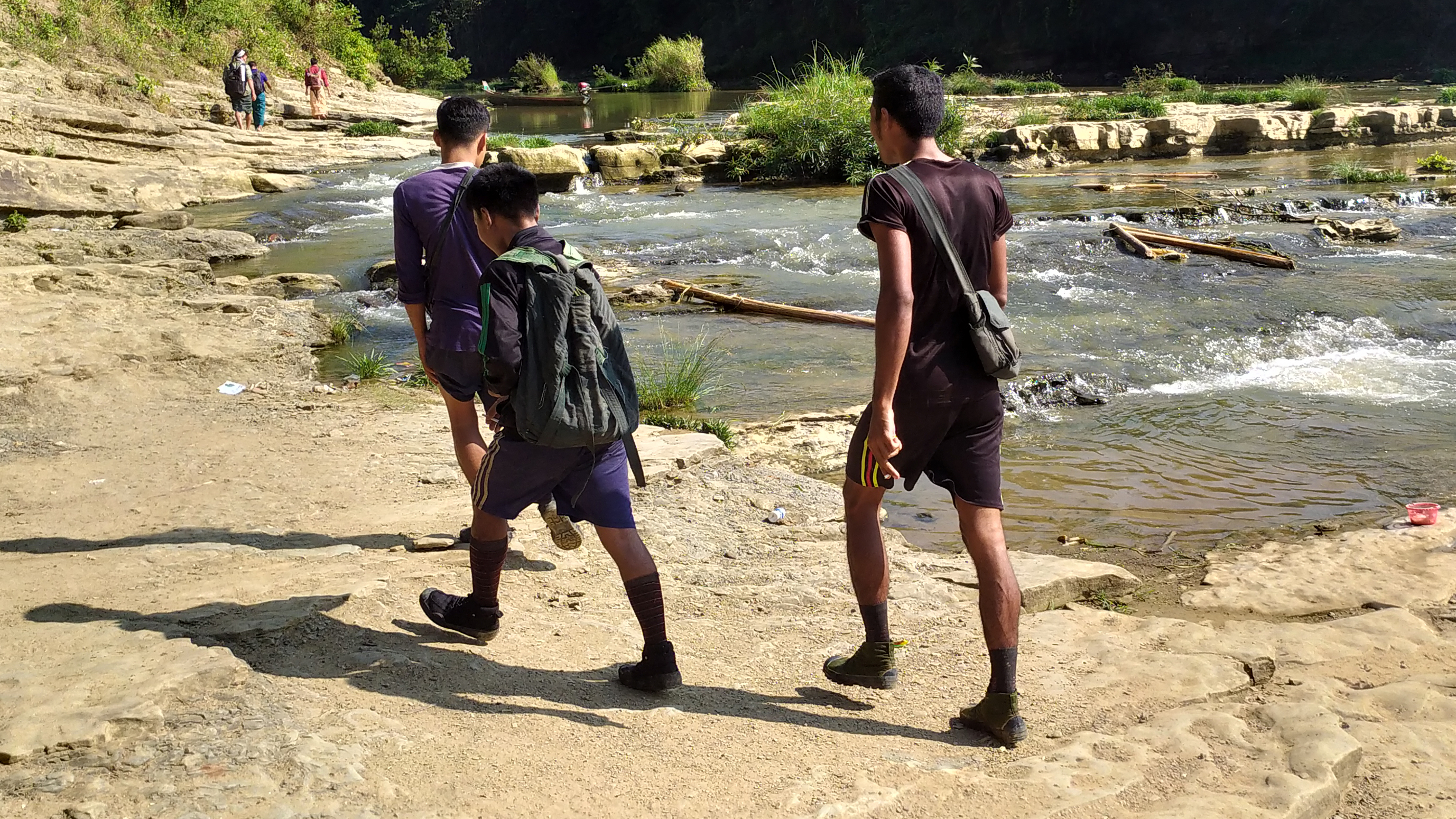
Young Arakan Army soldiers, 2021

After the 2021 Myanmar coup d'état both the military junta and government-in-exile withdrew its designation of the AA as a terrorist group. The State Administration Council (SAC) withdrew its designation on 11 March 2021, while the Committee Representing Pyidaungsu Hluttaw (CRPH) announced a few days later that it was rescinding its terrorist designation for all insurgent groups. Nevertheless, on 30 March, the AA threatened to end the ceasefire with the Tatmadaw should the SAC refuse to order a halt to the massacre of civilians protesting the coup. On 10 April 2021, the AA alongside its allies, TNLA and MNDAA, launched an attack on a police station south of Lashio in Shan State, killing at least 14 police officers and burning the station to the ground.

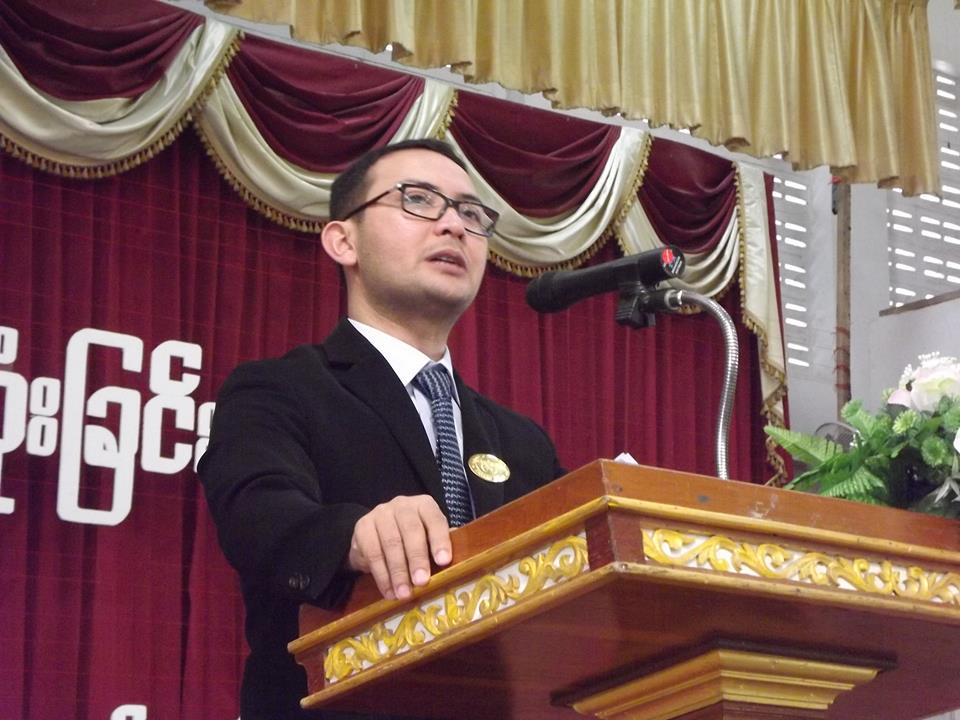
General Twan Mrat Naing, 2016

Between June and August 2022, the informal ceasefire in late 2020 between the Arakan Army and the junta broke down. With the military's attention on the increasing resistance elsewhere and increasing popular support to partner with the Nation Unity Government (NUG), AA began to seek an expansion of its influence into southern Rakhine. Rhetoric from AA leader Twan Mrat Naing in June grew more provocative with military spokespeople stating that the AA was inviting conflict.

Armed clashes resumed in July after the junta launched an airstrike against an AA base in Kayin State, killing 6 AA soldiers. AA retaliated in Maungdaw Township 12 days later killing four and capturing fourteen junta soldiers. Armed clashes broke out in northern Rakhine and western Chin State in late July and early August, including in the city of Paletwa, Chin State. By late August, travel to northern Rakhine required notifying series of checkpoints and all public transport ships ceased operating. Both the AA and the junta placed blockaded and strict prior notice for all travelers attempting to cross river and land blockades. The renewed war was markedly different as the junta had significantly less morale and the AA was now part of a popular de facto alliance with NUG-led resistance forces.

==== Ceasefire ====
On 26 November 2022, the Arakan Army and the junta agreed to a temporary ceasefire beginning on the following day. It was brokered by Yōhei Sasakawa of the Nippon Foundation who acted as an intermediary. AA spokseman Khaing Thu Kha stated that they agreed to it for humanitarian reasons and not because of international pressure. The group did not withdraw from fortifications held at the time of the ceasefire. A junta official told The Irrawaddy that it was the first step towards a permanent ceasefire. As of mid-December, tensions remained high with forces from both sides remaining in deployment within northern Rakhine State.

AA remained part of the Three Brotherhood Alliance and is reportedly involved in joint operations outside of Rakhine State, including Operation 1027, an offensive ranging from Lashio to Kokang, northern Shan State, in October 2023. AA also had multiple skirmishes with junta forces in Htigyaing Township, Sagaing Region. AA claimed that these skirmishes are part of Operation 1027. AA and KIA combined forces captured Gangdau Yang base on Myitkyina-Bhamo road on 31 October. A combined force of AA, KIA and local PDF started attacking Kawlin on 3 November and it was completely seized on 6 November. It became the first district-level town to be taken by the rebels.

==== Resumption of war and Operation 1027 ====
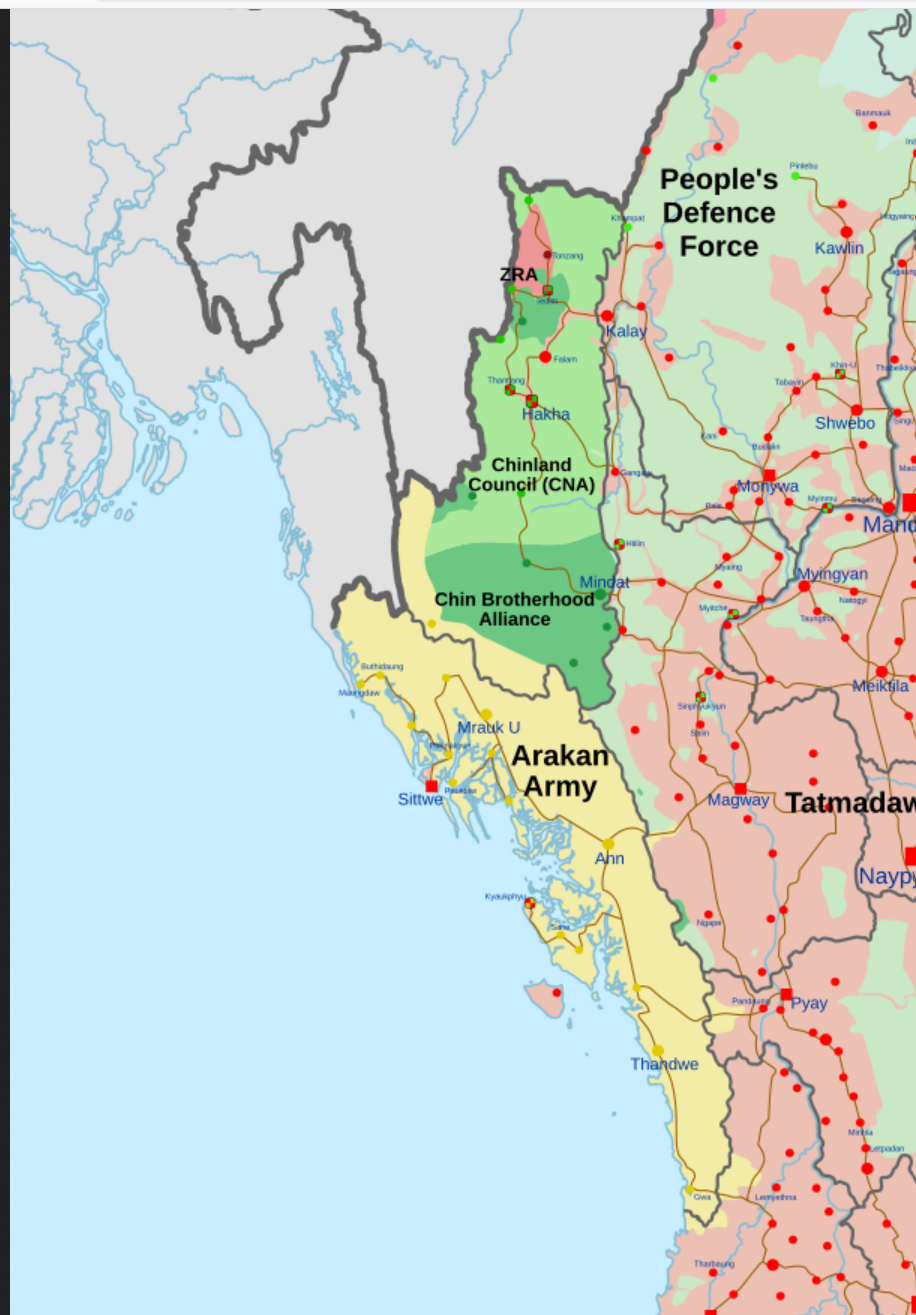
Territories captured and controlled by Arakan Army as of March 2025

On the morning of 13 November 2023, as part of Operation 1027, the Arakan Army attacked two Border Guard Police stations in Rathedaung Township, breaking the Rakhine state ceasefire agreement between the junta and AA.

The following night, the Arakan Army launched an attack on Pauktaw, seizing the Township's police station. By the next morning, the Arakan Army had taken control of the town. Pauktaw's proximity to the Rakhine state capital, Sittwe, posed a threat to the junta. The town was retaken by the junta the following day.

In December 2023, the Three Brotherhood Alliance, of which the Arakan Army is a part, and the junta agreed on a ceasefire in northern Shan State. Following this, in January 2024, the Arakan Army escalated their offence into Paletwa Township and captured Paletwa, a strategic town for the Indo-Myanmar Kaladan Multi-Modal Transit Transport Project. A week later, the Arakan Army again captured the town of Pauktaw, concluding a three-month battle.

In 2024, The Arakan Army captured the remaining Tatmadaw bases in Minbya on 6 February, thus taking full control of Minbya Township. The same day, the AA seized the Taung Pyo junta outpost along the border with Bangladesh in Maungdaw Township. The Arakan Army then captured Kyauktaw on 7 February, while heavy fighting continued in Mrauk U and Ramree. The Tatmadaw abandoned Myebon to go to Kyaukphyu on 9 February, leaving ammunition behind in their rush and abandoning the southern township of Mrauk-U District.

The following day, the AA took the historic town of Mrauk U, completing their control over the township. During the battle, three Myanmar Navy landing craft were reportedly sunk. In response to the seizure of the three towns, the junta blew up bridges in Kyauktaw Township and the state capital, Sittwe. 5 days later, the Arakan Army captured Myebon, completing their capture of the entirety of Mrauk-U District.

On 24 March, the Arakan Army began an offensive on Ann Township concurrently with their offensive on Sittwe, launching attacks on Ann, the headquarters of the junta's Western Command. North of Ann, the Arakan Army launched attacks on neighbouring Ngape Township in Magway Region. Ann's location is strategically important as the link between Rakhine and Magway via the Minbu-Ann road through the Arakan Mountains and as a gateway preventing AA from attacking southern Rakhine State. On 27 March, Arakan Army forces seized a camp near Ge Laung village, Ann Township. On 2 April, the Arakan Army announced it had captured a portion of the Ann-Minbu Highway, cutting off Ann from neighboring Padein.

During these offensives, on 10 April, the Arakan Army rebranded itself as the "Arakha Army" to represent all people living in Rakhine State. The Arakan Army and the Arakan Rohingya Salvation Army (ARSA) clashed in Buthidaung Township on 15 April, killing 25 Rohingyas. A local reported that the Tatmadaw and ARSA fought together during the clashes.

On 27 April, the Arakan Army captured Taw Hein Taung base in the hilltops of Ann township. On 6 May, the Arakan army also captured the 15th MOC headquarters. On 3 May, the Arakan Army captured the headquarters of the Border Guard Police in Maungdaw Township at Kyee Kan Pyin, forcing at least 128 junta soldiers to cross the border into Bangladesh. The next day, the Arakan Army announced that, after a prolonged siege, it had captured the 15th Military Operations Command near Buthidaung. The Arakan Army claimed that the battle for the base killed "hundreds" of junta soldiers, and that hundreds of junta soldiers and their families had surrendered.

On 13 April, the Arakan Army began clashing with junta forces along the Thandwe-Taungup highway. On 22 April, intense clashes broke out around the Tha Htay hydropower plant in northern Thandwe Township, reportedly leading to the deaths of "dozens" of junta soldiers. On 25 April, the Arakan Army began clashing with junta forces near the Ngapali Beach.

On 18 May, the Arakan Army captured Buthidaung and the remainder of Buthidaung Township. The Arakan Army began launching attacks on neighboring Maungdaw on 22 May.

On 29 May, the junta and the allied Arakan Liberation Army soldiers killed over 70 villagers from the village of Byian Phyu near Sittwe due to suspected Arakan Army sympathies in the village.

From late May to early June, the Arakan Army launched attacks on the remaining junta bases throughout Maungdaw Township. On 16 June, the AA urged residents of Maungdaw to evacuate the town, claiming that all junta bases in the township had either been captured or encircled, and that they would attack the town. In response to the fighting in Maungdaw, the Bangladesh Navy deployed warships around St. Martin's Island, which has been shot at several times by junta forces.

On 2 June, clashes again erupted on the Thandwe-Taungup highway near Ngapali Beach, with the AA captured Gawt village during the fighting. Over the next week, the fighting moved closer to Thandwe and neighboring Ngapali Beach, forcing the Thandwe Airport to close. During the fighting, Burmese forces shelled Singaung village, killing between 60 and 120 villagers. On 15 June, the Arakan Army launched an offensive to capture neighboring Taungup, with AA forces launching attacks on the junta base near Taungup University.

After months of relative peace, heavy clashes broke out outside of Kyaukphyu on 17 June after junta forces were leaving Danyawaddy naval base, near Thaing Chaung village, leading to 10 junta deaths.

On 20 June, AA forces ambushed a junta column along the Taungup-Pandaung road, leading to 60 junta deaths. On 23 June, AA forces captured Thandwe Airport, the first airport to be captured by resistance forces since the 2021 coup. By 26 June, fighting had spread to Ngapali Beach, and the AA began launching attacks on the last 2 junta bases in Thandwe town.

On 17 July, AA forces captured Thandwe itself after three weeks of fighting.

On 2 September, the SAC redeclared the AA as a terrorist group for "bombing civilians."

On 8 December 2024, Arakan Army gained full control of Myanmar's 270-kilometer-long border with Bangladesh, capturing Maungdaw Township and the Border Guard Police Battalion No. 5 after months of intense fighting. With this victory, the AA now controls all three Myanmar townships bordering Bangladesh: Maungdaw, Buthidaung, and Paletwa. In the aftermath of the Maungdaw battle, the AA arrested Brigadier General Thurein Tun and approximately 80 Rohingya insurgents. The ongoing conflict has worsened the famine in Rakhine, with the UN reporting that 2 million people are at risk. The junta's blockade has disrupted essential supplies.

On 13 December 2024 the Tatmadaw's MOC-5 surrendered to the AA. With that conquest, the Arakan Army managed to seize the entirety of Taungup and its township after 42 days of fighting.

By mid-to-late January 2025, Arakan Army claimed that it had seized multiple junta bases on the borders of Rakhine, Magway, Bago, and Ayeyarwady regions, including Moe Hti base and Points 263 and 369. Arakan Army and the joint PDF forces pushed into Shwethaungyan Subtownship, northwest Ayeyarwaddy Region taking the village of Magyizin. Battle with the junta intensified in the area as the Myanmar Navy increased bombardments to the Bawmi coastline area near Magyizin.

By February 2025, according to a recent CSIS reports, AA is alleged to already establishing local governments in the Rakhine townships it controls.

By late March, AA had reached the eastern side of the Arakan mountains taking villages in Lemyethna Township near the Pathein-Monywa Highway.

On 10 April 2026 (AA's 17th anniversary), Twan Mrat Naing vowed to achieve "final victory" by capturing all of Rakhine State by the end of 2027.

According to a 16 July 2026 report by the Jamestown Foundation, the Arakan Army is the largest active rebel group in the South Asia region.

== Governance ==
The AA established its political wing, the ULA, in 2016. After gaining most of the territories in Rakhine State, it has developed a formal administrative structure in the state known as the Arakan People’s Revolutionary Government. Major decisions are made by five top leaders who hold positions within AA. The AA developed public service like justice system and judicial services. The ULA/AA also operates hospitals, clinics and educational institutions. It has also created the Humanitarian and Development Coordination Office (HDCO) in 2022.

== War crimes and atrocities ==
The Arakan Army (AA) has been accused of forcibly recruiting ethnic minorities in Rakhine state into its organisational structure and claiming to create an inclusive, federalist government to counter the Tatmadaw in Rakhine. Reports allege atrocities being carried out by the AA and the use of Rohingya people as cannon fodder and human shields. Other reports allege that the junta had been exploiting tensions between the Arakanese and Rohingya by forcefully recruiting Rohingya people to be used as human shields and cannon fodders. AA spokesperson Khaing Thu Kha stated that the allegations were part of a smear campaign, citing the evidence presented showing that AA were striking junta targets. In February 2019, the armed group, alongside with four other groups, was banned on Facebook by Meta which classified them as a "dangerous organization".

Analyst David Scott Mathieson noted that conflicting accounts of incidents have caused confusion among international observers, which is exacerbated by the SAC's recruitment of Rohingya men into its military. He stated that "multiple realities can exist at the same time: that AA forces can perpetrate atrocities at one location whilst also aiding civilians elsewhere. But observers shouldn't lose sight of the fact that the Myanmar Armed Forces are committing crimes just like this across Myanmar against multiple communities." Political analyst Paul Greening expressed a similar analysis that some AA members committed war crimes but that there was a lack of systematic intent to destroy the Rohingya as an ethnic group.

In January 2026, the British Government has stated concerns regarding risks of persecution of Rohingya minority by the Arakan Army. The Burma Campaign UK has also called the British government to impose sanctions on the AA.

Fortify Rights, an international human rights organization, documented atrocities committed by AA in 2024 through survivor testimonies, open-source videos, and photographs and called on the International Criminal Court (ICC) to investigate the AA's actions as potential war crimes. The organisation's report described how the evidence revealed the deliberate nature of the attacks, including the use of surveillance drones before launching offensives.

=== Atrocities against Rohingyas ===
Between 4 and 6 February 2024, the Arakan Army launched attacks on Rakhine BGP outposts in Maungdaw Township, later alleging without providing evidence that the Arakan Rohingya Salvation Army and Rohingya Solidarity Organisation (RSO) fought alongside the Rakhine BGP. The RSO denounced AA's accusations and the AA labeling them as "Bengalis" among other issues. Later in February when the junta began conscripting largely non-citizen displaced Rohingyas living in Kyaukphyu, AA spokesman, Khaing Thu Kha, called upon young Rohingya men fleeing conscription to seek refuge in their territory. The AA denied regime claims of targeting Rohingya for recruitment encouraging anyone regardless of ethnicity or religion to volunteer.

AA has also been accused of targeted strikes against Rohingya civilians, particularly in a series of attacks in early August 2024 along the Myanmar-Bangladesh border when over a hundred Rohingya were killed. Witnesses reporting the intentional targeting of civilians with drones and artillery.

On 18 May 2024, when Arakan Army captured Buthidaung, Rohingya activists accused the Arakan Army of burning and targeting Rohingya homes in the town, a claim which the Arakan Army denied.

On 5 and 6 August 2024, AA forces launched attacks along the Myanmar-Bangladesh border, targeting thousands of fleeing Rohingya civilians. According to eyewitnesses and survivors, these assaults resulted in over a hundred deaths, including women and children, and countless injuries as they sought refuge in Bangladesh. According to Rohingya news organization Kaladan Press, witnesses reported the intentional targeting of civilians using drones and heavy artillery. RSO fighters were seen gathering in the area, with armed men seen running alongside the civilians.

Between March and August 2024, activist Nay San Lwin reported to The New Humanitarian that at least 2,500 Rohingya were killed, and approximately 40,000 were forced to flee the country by the Arakan Army.

On 29 August 2024, CNN reported that, based on eyewitness accounts that they could not independently verify, Rohingya refugees had experienced persecution from the Arakan Army in recent months during the group's Rakhine State offensive against the Myanmar military. Numerous Rohingya refugees in Bangladesh's Cox's Bazar camp expressed to CNN the sentiment that the "AA wants to wipe out Rohingyas from Rakhine State".

Bangladesh's Refugee Relief and Repatriation Commissioner, Mohammed Mizanur Rahman, stated in April 2025 that Rohingya refugees claimed to be fleeing persecution from the Arakan Army who have enabled Arakanese people from Bangladesh, Nepal and India to settle into Rohingya areas in Rakhine State. Pro-ULA media denied these claims, citing the unsuitability of these areas for settlement amidst active bombings and gunfire.

On 3 August 2025, the newly formed Arakan Rohingya National Council published photos showing human remains from a massacre allegedly committed by AA against between 170-600 Rohingya in Htan Shauk Khan (Hoyyar Siri in Rohingya) village, Buthidaung Township, on 2 May 2024. Several women were allegedly raped. The attacks reportedly occurred after sightings of Tatmadaw soldiers and ARSA militants. AA spokesperson Khaing Thu Kha denied AA's responsibility, calling the allegations a smear campaign stating that the bodies were Tatmadaw soldiers and Muslim conscripts, citing military headwear and boots present in the photos. Tatmadaw spokesperson Zaw Min Tun denied its troops were present in the area at the time, while ULA chief administrator Aung Thaung Shwe argued that the village was close to the 551st battalion base where heavy fighting had occurred around that time.

Some Rohingya disputed assertions of discrimination by the Arakan Army. A local resident in Myebon told The Irrawaddy that Rohingya can access clinics and markets if they have money, enjoy religious freedom, and face friendlier attitudes than before AA control.

=== Other atrocities ===
The Committee to Protect Journalists called on the AA to release Border News Agency correspondent, Ma Mudra, after she was accosted by AA on 20 September 2025 while working on a story covering the lack of educational opportunities in ethnic Mro areas of Maungdaw. Khaing Thu Kha claimed that she broke the rules of conflict and was being interrogated for security reasons. The Bangladesh Border Guard (BGB) has further accused the AA of internal crises and abuses against other ethnic minorities such as the Mro and Tanchangya people, driving some victims to flee to Bangladesh.

Fortify Rights, a human rights NGO, released a report claiming that the AA was subjecting Hindu, Kamein, Mro and Chakma individuals to forced labor and conscription. AA rebutted the accusations as lacking specific evidence and containing "baseless [allegations by] religious extremists". In an 2 March 2026 interview with Rajeev Bhattacharyya for The Diplomat, Twan Mrat Naing dismissed allegations of human rights violations against minorities by AA as "accusations [that benefit the narratives of particular groups, especially diaspora activists, who weaponize human rights]," and defended conscription as a "necessary [emergency measure]."

== International affairs ==
=== Bangladesh ===
In a 2021 interview with Prothom Alo, army chief Twan Mrat Naing said the organization wanted to have good relations with Bangladesh and work with them on the Rohingya issue.

The Arakan Army has also stated that nearly 11 militant groups, including the Rohingya Solidarity Organisation (RSO), Arakan Rohingya Salvation Army (ARSA), and Arakan Rohingya Army (ARA), operate from Rohingya refugee camps in Bangladesh, carrying out killings, rapes, kidnappings, and torture against the Buddhists and Hindu population on Myanmar-Bangladesh border. The towns most vulnerable and impacted are Maungdaw and Buthidaung. According to the reports, it is alleged that groups like the RSO have ties to Al-Qaeda which exploits the local Muslim population as human shields to fight against the non-Muslim population. The Arakan Army further accused Bangladesh of ignoring the growth of such groups within its borders.

In February 2025, Khalilur Rahman, the chief adviser's high representative on the Rohingya issue, said Bangladesh is in contact with the Arakan Army to protect its border and support Rohingya repatriation, despite objections from the Burmese military junta. He also called the AA to include Rohingyas in, what he described, the "new administration" of Arakan. According to the international analysts, Bangladesh was negotiating with AA for a respectable return for Rohingyas to their homeland; and if any compromise is arrived, they were considering to open the borders with Rakhaine State under United Nations' supervision. The proposal of a "humanitarian corridor" for Rakhaine State was endorsed by Md. Touhid Hossain, then-Adviser of Foreign Affairs of Bangladesh, however, this proposal faced heavy opposition from various Bangladeshi political parties across the spectrum, including the Bangladesh Nationalist Party, Jamaat-e-Islami, National Citizen Party, and the Communist Party of Bangladesh. Rohingya leaders worldwide called Bangladeshi government to act cautiously regarding the AA.

In the following month, Home Affairs Adviser Jahangir Alam stated that Bangladeshi traders have to now pay taxes twice when importing goods from Myanmar, first to its government at Sittwe and then to the Arakan Army at the Naf River border.

In April 2025, Jamaat-e-Islami Secretary General Mia Golam Parwar condemned the Arakan Army's armed intrusion and celebration of Sangrai festival in Bandarban's Thanchi Upazila, calling it a serious violation of Bangladesh's sovereignty. He criticized the government's silence and demanded strong action against the group's activities in the Chittagong Hill Tracts region.

Upon Rahman's appointment as Minister of Foreign Affairs in February 2026, Twan Mrat Naing sent a letter urging continued relationships between AA and Bangladesh.

=== China ===
Due to the economic interests in Rakhine State, China has maintained pragmatic ties with the Arakan Army. By 2022, reports have indicated that China has provided substantial support with an estimation of approximately 95% of the group's weaponry funding. However, since 2025, AA has become relevantly less dependent on China.

The AA has expressed large support for Chinese investments in Rakhine State, welcoming the country to engage in mutually beneficial projects. The AA has also issued statements in Mandarin alongside Burmese and English. In April 2026, Chinese delegations held talks with the Arakan Army over the Belt and Road Initiative railway project.

=== India ===
The Arakan Army has targeted India's Kaladan Multi-Modal Transit Transport Project but not China's projects in the region, leading some to accuse China of diplo-terrorism. However, in February 2024, the Arakan Army stated that it would not prevent the completion of the project. An AA spokesperson express support for the project and that they hoped to improve relations and provide mutual support. In March 2024, an Indian delegation, including Member of Parliament K. Vanlalvena, met with AA representatives in Myanmar's Chin State.

AA-India relations have improved significantly since mid-2024, with Indian lawmakers visiting Rakhine to meet AA leaders and discuss regional project security. On the same month, Mizoram CM Lalduhoma showed interest in friendly relations with the AA and Chin armed groups by expressing hope that Chin, Mizo and Kuki peoples living in Myanmar, India and Bangladesh may one day be united under a single administration.

The Indian government has been engaging with the Arakan Army indirectly through the Mizoram government. It is known that the AA has established a representative office in Mizoram. Since the capture of Kyauktaw Township in 2024, the Mizoram State Government and the AA have negotiated agreements to allow the import of goods into Rakhine via Mizoram.

== Arrests ==
In July 2019, the Myanmar Police, in cooperation with the government of Singapore, arrested AA leader Twan Mrat Naing's younger brother, Aung Mrat Kyaw, along with others who were accused of financially supporting the AA. In September, his younger sister and brother-in-law were also detained by Myanmar Police when they returned to Myanmar from Thailand.

On 6 December, Twan Mrat Naing's wife Hnin Zar Phyu and their two children were detained by Thai immigration officials in Chiang Mai. Officials arrested her due to the presence of her name on the list of people affiliated with the Arakan Army, provided by the Myanmar Government. On 25 February 2020, the detained family left for Switzerland under the political asylum initiated by the UNHCR.
