= Arakanese =

Arakanese may refer to:

- anything of or relating to Arakan, a region of Myanmar
- anything of or relating to the Kingdom of Arakan, a former kingdom centred in the region
- Arakanese people, an ethnic group of Arakan
- Muslim Arakanese
  - Kamein people, Arakanese people who follow Islam
  - Rohingya people, another ethnic group residing in Arakan who predominantly follow Islam
- Arakanese language, a Tibeto-Burman language

== See also ==
- Arakan (disambiguation)
- Rakhine (disambiguation)
