= Minbya Township =

Coordinates: 20.3667°N 93.2667°E

Minbya Township မင်းပြားမြို့နယ်
- Township
- Location in Mrauk-U district
- Country: Burma
- State: Rakhine State
- District: Mrauk-U District

Population
  - Ethnicities: Rakhine
- Time zone: UTC+6:30 (MST)

Minbya Township (Burmese: မင်းပြားမြို့နယ်) is a township of Mrauk-U District in the Rakhine State of Myanmar. The township's principal town Minbya is located along the Lemro River, in the westernmost part of Myanmar.

During the civil war in Myanmar, Minbya experienced heavy clashes between the Tatmadaw and the Arakan Army. The township came under almost full control of the Arakan Army on 6 February 2024. However, the Number 9 Central Military Training School remained a bastion of junta resistance until 26 February 2024 upon its capture.
