= Mrauk-U District =

Coordinates: 20.6000°N 93.2000°E

- District
- Location in Rakhine State
- Country: Myanmar
- State: Rakhine State
- Capital: Mrauk-U
- Townships: 4

Population (2014)
  - Total: 668,634
  - Ethnicities: Rakhine Bamar Muslim Chin Maramagyi Bengali Hindus
- Time zone: UTC+6.30 (MST)

Mrauk-U District (Burmese: မြောက်ဦးခရိုင်) is a district of Rakhine State, Myanmar. Its administrative center is the city of Mrauk-U.

== History ==
Mrauk-U District was created when it was split off from Sittwe District.

On December 28, 2023, during the Myanmar civil war, the Brotherhood Alliance claimed that, the Arakan Army had seized the district's police station from the military junta. Junta forces reportedly responded with air and artillery strikes to defend the police station and the junta’s Thu Taw Ma military base.

== Geography ==
Twenty-five mountains have been officially named in Mrauk-U. Kema Taung is the highest place in this district. Yulin Jung is the most prominent mountain.

== Administrative divisions ==
Mrauk-U District is administratively divided into four townships:

- Kyauktaw Township
- Mrauk-U Township
- Minbya Township
- Myebon Township

== Economy and development ==
According to a 2016 report by ReliefWeb, all villages in Mrauk-U District suffer from "widespread underdevelopment".

== Demographics ==
According to the 2014 census, the district had a population of 668,634 people, of whom 310,622 were men and 358,012 were women. The district is home to multiple ethnic groups, generally split between ethnic Rakhines and Muslims, but also including minorities of Hindus, Chin, and Maramargyi. Perceived communal relations have improved in the district in recent years.

== Bibliography ==
- Early Recovery Multi-Sector Assessment of Mrauk-U District - Myanmar. ReliefWeb (Report). 31 March 2016.
