= Sittwe District =

Coordinates: 20°30′N 93°20′E

- District
- Location in Rakhine State
- Country: Myanmar
- State: Rakhine State
- Capital: Sittwe
- Townships: 4

Population (2014)
  - Total: 537,300
- Time zone: UTC+6.30 (MST)

Sittwe District (Burmese: စစ်တွေခရိုင်) formerly known as Akyab District is a district of Rakhine State, in western Myanmar. Its administrative center Sittwe serves as the capital of Rakhine State.

== Administrative divisions ==
Sittwe District consists of the following townships:

- Pauktaw Township
- Ponnagyun Township
- Rathedaung Township
- Sittwe Township

== Demographics ==
According to the 2014 census, the district had a population of 537,300 people, of whom 250,712 were men and 286,588 women.
