= List of people of Rakhine descent =

The following is the list of notable Rakhine people or people of Rakhine descent.

== Activists ==
- Daw Kyan - historian and writer
- Mya Sein - writer, educator and historian
- Rani Yan Yan - Consort to Chief of the Chakma Circle and women's rights activist
- Kyaw Soe Oo - journalist for Reuters
- U Ottama - Buddhist monk, author, and a leader of the Burmese independence movement during British Burma

== Entertainment ==
- Aung Lwin - actor and director
- Aung Rakhine - film director
- Chue Lay - television and film actress
- Kaiser - singer and songwriter
- Min Thway - actor and singer
- Nay Toe - film actor and comedian
- Shine - singer and musician
- Thar Nge - singer
- Yadanar Phyu Phyu Aung - actress and singer
- Yamin May Oo - actress and model
- Zun Than Sin - model, musician, and beauty pageant

== Monarchs ==
- See List of Arakanese monarchs

== Politicians ==
- Aung Zan Wai - Minister for Social Services in Sittwe
- Aye Maung - Chairperson of the Arakan National Party and current leader of Arakan Front Party
- Aye Nu Sein - lawyer, vice-chair of the Arakan National Party and former Member of the State Administration Council
- Aye Tha Aung - former Deputy Speaker of the Amyotha Hluttaw, the upper house of the Myanmar parliament
- Aye Thein Rakhaine - Bangladeshi academic and politician
- Ethinab Rakhain - Bangladeshi politician and a former member of the Bangladesh Parliament
- Khaing Raza - Commander in Chief of National United Party of Arakan
- Khaing Thu Kha - spokesperson to the Arakan Army (armed group of the United League of Arakan)
- Kyaw Kyaw - former Amyotha Hluttaw MP for Rakhine State No. 4 Constituency and member of Rakhine National Party
- Kyaw Kyaw Win - Member of the House of Nationalities in Rakhine State, lawyer and member of the Arakan National Party
- Kyaw Than - former Amyotha Hluttaw MP for Rakhine State No. 10 Constituency
- Kyaw Thein - former Amyotha Hluttaw MP for Rakhine State No. 7 Constituency
- Kyaw Zaw Oo - former member of parliament in the Rakhine State Hluttaw and elected MP in Sittwe-2 constituency in 2015.
- Maung Kyaw Zan - former Amyotha Hluttaw MP for Rakhine State No. 9 Constituency
- May Oung - scholar, judge and politician served as the Minister of Home Affairs during the colonial era
- Nyo Twan Awng - Vice Commander-in-Chief of the Arakan Army
- Pe Myint - politician, writer and a former Minister for Information
- Saw Mra Razar Lin - politician and former revolutionary soldier
- Twan Mrat Naing - revolutionary and commander in chief of the Arakan Army
- U Oo Hla Saw - politician, poet, writer
- U Oo Tha Tun - co-founder of the Arakan League for Democracy
- Wai Sein Aung - former Amyotha Hluttaw MP for Rakhine State No. 1 Constituency

== Scholars ==
- Shwe Zan Aung - first to introduce Theravada Abhidhamma texts to the Western world

== Sports ==
- Maung Maung Win - footballer (born 1994)
- Thiha Htet Aung - footballer (born 1996)
