= Wai Sein Aung =

Burmese politician

Member of the Amyotha Hluttaw
- Incumbent
- Assumed office 1 February 2016
- Constituency: Rakhine State No.1

Personal details
- Born: 28 March 1946 (age 80) Rathedaung Township, Rakhine State, British Burma
- Party: Arakan Front Party
- Spouse: Saw Thein Dan
- Children: Kyaw Zaw Oo and 3 other children
- Parent(s): Saw Hla Phyu (father); Hnin San Phyu (mother)
- Education: Workers' College B.Sc (General)
- Occupation: Politician

Wai Sein Aung (Burmese: ဝေစိန်အောင်; born 28 March 1946) is an Arakanese politician who currently serves as an Amyotha Hluttaw MP for Rakhine State No. 1 Constituency (i.e. Sittwe township). Although he is taken to be a member of Arakan National Party and is being blocked from resigning from it, he is serving as an advisory council member of the Arakan Front Party.

== Early life and career ==
Wai was born on 20 March 1946 in Rathedaung Township, Rakhine State, Myanmar. He is an ethnic Rakhine. He graduated with B.Sc (General) from Workers' College. From 1976 to 1980, he worked as a school teacher. He had served as secretary of Arakan League for Democracy in 1988 and as general secretary of Rakhine People's Democratic Party from 1989 to 1990.

== Political career ==
He was a member of the Arakan National Party. In the 2015 Myanmar general election, he was elected as an Amyotha Hluttaw MP from Rakhine State No. 1 parliamentary constituency (i.e. Sittwe township) and his son, Kyaw Zaw Oo, was elected for the Rakhine State Hluttaw in the same Sittwe township.
