= Kyaw Zaw Oo =

Arakanese politician

- ကျော်ဇောဦး

Member of the Rakhine State Hluttaw for Sittwe Township-2
- In office 1 February 2015 – 31 January 2021
- Constituency: Sittwe Township-2

Member of the Rakhine State Hluttaw
- In office 1 February 2015 – 31 January 2021

Personal details
- Born: 1 October 1972 (age 54)
- Party: Arakan Front Party (2017–present); Independent (2017); Arakan National Party (2014–17); Rakhine Nationalities Development Party (2010–14)
- Education: Government Technical Institute (Pyay)
- Occupation: Politician
- Website: https://kzo.home.blog/

Kyaw Zaw Oo (Burmese: ကျော်ဇောဦး) is an Arakanese politician, who used to serve as a member of parliament in the Rakhine State Hluttaw for (2015–2020) tenure. He was elected MP as an independent candidate in Sittwe-2 constituency in 2015. He is now leading the Arakan Front Party as its vice chair.

== Political career ==
In the 2015 Myanmar general election, as he was elected for the Rakhine State Hluttaw, his father, Wai Sein Aung, was elected as an Amyotha Hluttaw MP from Rakhine State No. 1 parliamentary constituency (i.e. Sittwe township).

Kyaw Zaw Oo proposed, in 2016 December, a motion to the Rakhine state parliament that the local parliament should not recognise the existence or the findings of the (Kofi Annan-led) Advisory Commission on Rakhine State (Burmese: ရခိုင်ပြည်နယ်ဆိုင်ရာ အကြံပေးကော်မရှင်), which was formed by central Myanmar government, the parliament approved it after discussion.

He submitted his resignation from the Arakan National Party on 4 December 2017, a week after Dr Aye Maung's resignation.

=== On 1982 Myanmar Citizenship Law ===
Kyaw Zaw Oo has been an advocate of 1982 Myanmar Citizenship Law, in which the citizenship is granted on the principle of jus sanguinis (Latin for “blood rights” or “law of the bloodline”). He wrote articles on this subject in national daily newspapers, and gave talks on it as well.

=== Alerting about Kha Maung Seik massacre ===
Near the end of August 2017 in Kha Maung Seik (also known as Fakir Bazar) of Maungdaw Township, about a hundred Hindus men and women were massacred by ARSA. While that incident was buried in the fog caused by the then ARSA violences, Kyaw Zaw Oo investigated it and posted a detailed account about it on Facebook on 13 September 2017, consequently, being the first in alerting the domestic and international communities about the incident.

=== Open Letter to Min Aung Hlaing ===
On 17 March 2019, Kyaw Zaw Oo published a bi-lingual open letter to senior general Min Aung Hlaing (commander-in-chief of Myanmar Armed Forces) about many rights violations of Tatmadaw (Myanmar Armed Forces) in Rakhine State, inflicting on lives and property of the civilians, damaging some buildings of cultural heritage as well.

== See also ==
- Arakan Front Party
- Wai Sein Aung

== Sources ==
- Myanmar's Rohingya Crisis Enters a Dangerous New Phase (PDF). International Crisis Group. 2017. p. 7. Archived from the original (PDF) on 5 November 2020.
- Open Letter to Senior General Min Aung Hlaing from U Kyaw Zaw Oo about damage to cultural heritage, fatalities and casualties incurred by intentional and indiscriminate attacks of Myanma Tatmadaw on non-military targets. Kyaw Zaw Oo. 2019. Archived from the original on 27 December 2020.
- သမိုင်းဝင် ယဉ်ကျေးမှုဆိုင်ရာအဆောက်အအုံများအပါအဝင် စစ်ဖက်ပစ်မှတ်မဟုတ်သည့်နေရာများသို့ တမင်သက်သက် ပစ်ခတ်ကြသဖြင့် သေဆုံးထိခိုက်ကြရသည့်ကိစ္စ အိတ်ဖွင့်ပေးစာ. Kyaw Zaw Oo. 2019. Archived from the original on 27 December 2020.
