= Htoot May =

Burmese politician (born 1979)

Member of the Amyotha Hluttaw
- Incumbent
- Assumed office 1 February 2016
- Constituency: Rakhine State No.11
- Majority: 15985 votes

Personal details
- Born: 16 June 1979 (age 47) Kyauk Tway village, Ramree Township, Rakhine State, Burma (Myanmar)
- Party: Rakhine National Party
- Parent(s): Kyaw Thein Phyu(father); Saw Pwint Chay(mother)
- Education: Dagon University B.A(Phil) ၊ D.S.Enng: ၊ L . L . F (USA)

Htoot May (Burmese: ထုမေ, born 16 June 1979) is a Burmese politician and currently serves as an Amyotha Hluttaw MP for Rakhine State No. 11 Constituency . She is a member of Arakan National Party.

== Early life and education ==
She was born on 16 June 1979 in Kyauk Tway village, Ramree Township, Rakhine State, Burma (Myanmar). Her parents are farmers and she is the youngest of five children. She was moved to Yangon in 1996 and attended at the University of Distance Education Dagon. After moving to Yangon, she faced language barriers as an ethnic Rakhine speaker but continued her studies while helping with her family's businesses. She later became involved in teaching, youth education, women's leadership training, and political activism. She was wanted to become a nurse but she was not able to attend. In addition, she learned English Language with an expatriate teacher at Buddhist monastery in Sanchaung Township. And then, she graduated from Dagon University with B.A(Philo) in 2002, D.S.E and L . L . F (USA).

== Life activities and business holding ==
Her cousins was introduced her to a private learning centre and she started going to the British Council at the weekend to practice her English, and also joined the library together with the teachers from school organized conversation clubs . She was not a party member but Arakan League for Democracy recommended to attend some courses at the British Council. She knew more about how democratic systems work and the political system in the UK and had desired to get involved in politics. Later on, she became a member of the Arakan League for Democracy as youth. When Cyclone Nargis devastated the Ayeyarwady Delta, she had helped among three months to it affected people together with NGOs and local authorities at 2008. In 2010, when Cyclone Giri caused damage to Rakhine State, she also served as a project manager of an emergency relief project. In 2011, she was joined to Arakkha Foundation. And then, she participated in education and leadership training for Rakhine women from Arakan, Paletwa, Yangon and Ayeyarwady Division and became strongly motivated to boost development in Burma. For these results and other efforts, she was selected as a youth leader to meet British Prime Minister David Cameron in 2012. In 2014, she was one of 18 pioneering figures from Myanmar at the Liberty and Leadership Forum. Htoot May founded the Htoot May Youth and Educational Foundation on 2016 and granted scholarships to six young Arakanese women to study English for nine months.

== Political career ==
In 2006, she became an active member of Arakan League for Democracy. In the 2015 Myanmar general election, she was elected as an Amyotha Hluttaw MP, winning a majority of 15985 votes and elected representative from Rakhine State No. 11 parliamentary constituency. She also serves as the secretary at the ASEAN inter-Parliamentary Assembly in the Union legislature of 16-member Joint Committee.

She later became part of the Arakan National Party after party mergers ahead of the 2015 election.
