= Nyi Pu (politician) =

Burmese lawyer and politician

His Excellency Nyi Pu
- ဦးညီပု

3rd Chief Minister of Rakhine State
- In office March 30, 2016 – February 1, 2021
- Appointed by: President of Myanmar
- President: Htin Kyaw
- Preceded by: Maung Maung Ohn
- Succeeded by: Aung Kyaw Min

Personal details
- Party: National League for Democracy
- Cabinet: Rakhine State Government

Nyi Pu (Burmese: ဦးညီပု) is a Burmese lawyer and politician. He served as the third chief minister of Rakhine State in Htin Kyaw's Cabinet, before being arrested during the military coup d'état on 1 February 2021. He was elected from Gwa Township in the 2015 Myanmar general election and became the chief minister on March 30.

== Early life and political career ==
U Nyi Pu is the NLD chair for his native Rakhine State in Myanmar (Burma). He graduated with a degree in law from Rangoon University in 1983 and then worked as a security guard until 1988. He briefly served as a clerk in the Land Transport Department and in the 1990 elections won but was not allowed to assume his parliamentary seat. In November's election, he won a spot in Gwa. His appointment to the chief minister post was hotly contested by the Arakan National Party.

Nyi Pu was arrested in Gwa Township on 1 February 2021 during the military coup, but was released on the following day, although he was required to remain under house arrest. He was again arrested on 11 February and accused of sedition. His daughter Moe San Suu Kyi was arrested in May 2021. Nyi Pu was sentenced to two years hard labour on 8 October. On 19 January 2022, he was jailed for nine years over corruption charges.
