= Myint Naing (politician, born 1968) =

Burmese politician

Member of the Amyotha Hluttaw
- Incumbent
- Assumed office 1 February 2016
- Constituency: Rakhine State No.5

Personal details
- Born: 5 July 1968 (age 58) kyauktaw, Rakhine State, Burma (Myanmar)
- Party: Rakhine National Party
- Spouse: Ma Thidar
- Children: Si Thu Ye Zaw
- Parent(s): Kyaw San(father); Khin Mya (mother)
- Education: B.A. (Hist), Sittwe University

Myint Naing (Burmese: မြင့်နိုင်, born 5 July 1968) is a Burmese politician who currently serves as an Amyotha Hluttaw MP for Rakhine State No. 5 constituency. He is a member of Rakhine National Party.

== Early life and education ==
He was born on 5 July 1968 in Kyauktaw, Rakhine State, Burma (Myanmar). He graduated with B.A. (Hist) from Sittwe University. His previous job was in the military service.

== Political career ==
He is a member of the Rakhine National Party. In the 2015 Myanmar general election, he was elected as an Amyotha Hluttaw MP and elected representative from Rakhine State No. 5 preliminary constituency.
