= 2018 Mrauk U riot =

2018 riot in Rakhine State, Myanmar

Mrauk U riot
- Part of the Myanmar conflict
- Date: 16 January 2018
- Location: Mrauk U, Rakhine State, Myanmar; 20°35′38″N 93°11′43″E
- Caused by: Ban issued by authorities on an event which commemorated the 233rd anniversary of the end of the Kingdom of Mrauk U
- Result: Police opening fire on protesters after they tried to seize a government building

Parties
Rakhine protesters	Myanmar Police Force

Lead figures
Aye Maung	Bo Bo Min Thaik

Number
4,000 (government claim)	

Casualties
- Deaths: 7
- Injuries: 12
- Arrested: 1
- Detained: 8

On 16 January 2018, a group of ethnic Rakhine locals in the town of Mrauk U in Rakhine State, Myanmar, protested against a ban on an event commemorating the 233rd anniversary of the Kingdom of Mrauk U's end. When the demonstration reached the local government office, some protesters began to riot and stormed the building. Responding policemen fired warning shots and then into the crowd after some protesters allegedly attempted to seize two policemen's firearms. Seven protesters were killed and twelve others were wounded.

== Background ==
An annual event commemorating the 233rd anniversary of the Kingdom of Mrauk U's dissolution was planned to take place at 6:00 pm (MMT) on 16 January 2018. It was organised by a local charity and planned to have Aye Maung, a prominent Rakhine politician and member of the Pyithu Hluttaw, as a speaker. Organisers had their event permit approved by Mrauk U's Department of Archaeology and Cultural Heritage Conservation on 8 January, but Border Affairs Minister Phone Tint banned it and superseded the department's decision a day before the event, demanding that the organisers resubmit their permit after concerns regarding peaceful assembly and the location of the event on a national heritage site.

== Riot ==
Hundreds of event attendees marched towards Mrauk U's police station at 7:00 pm on 16 January 2018, later joined by thousands of protesters, demanding that the event be allowed to take place. According to eyewitnesses, the group arrived at the police station thirty minutes later and began negotiating with policemen for 20 minutes, until the police told them that the district administration officials had banned the event and that there was nothing they could do. As a result, attendees and protesters began marching towards the district administration office.

At 9:30 pm, protesters reportedly began shouting slogans in support of the event and against the authorities who banned it in front of the office building. Word spread that protesters had been arrested inside the building, and protesters began climbing over the surrounding fences. Police fired warning shots at the protesters and used megaphones to demand that the crowd disperse. According to the authorities, the situation escalated when 4,000 people stormed the office building and began destroying property. Some protesters allegedly attempted to grab the firearms of two policemen, prompting police to fire into the crowd, killing seven protesters and wounding twelve others. According to eyewitnesses and wounded protesters, policemen fired from both in front of and behind the crowd.

== Aftermath ==
The office of the State Counsellor of Myanmar released a statement after the riot, stating that the police response was justified by the storming of the administration office by protesters. Locals in Mrauk U subsequently demanded an impartial and independent investigation into the riot. In response, the Rakhine State Government announced it would send two teams of investigators, one from the central government in Naypyidaw and one from the state government in Sittwe.

Eight protesters were detained in connection to the riot, and Aye Maung, who was supposed to speak at the event, was arrested for allegedly supporting the Arakan Army, a Rakhine ethnic armed organisation.

Bo Bo Min Thaik, the former administrative officer of Mrauk U who resigned after the riot, was found stabbed to death in a burning car on the Yangon–Sittwe Highway near the village of Thayattcho on 31 January 2018. Authorities blamed the Arakan Army, but stated that there was no evidence linking the murder to the riot.
