= U Oo Hla Saw =

Rakhine politician, poet, and writer (1953–2025)

U Hla Saw
- ဦးဦးလှစော
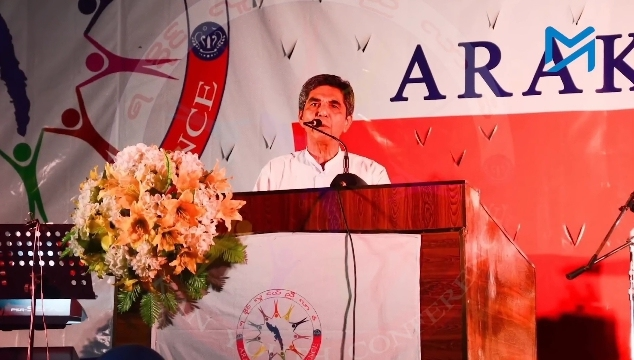
- Oo Hla Saw giving speech

Member of the Rakhine State Hluttaw for Mrauk-U Township
- In office 2014–2021
- Constituency: Mrauk-U Township

Co-founder and General Secretary of the Rakhine Nationalities Development Party
- In office 2010–2012

Member/Secretary of the Arakan League for Democracy
- In office 1990–2010

Founding member and Policy-Steering Committee of Arakan National Party
- In office 2014–2021

Member of United League of Arakan
- In office 2022–2025

Personal details
- Born: May 27, 1953 Mrauk U, Arakan State, Burma
- Died: May 5, 2025 (aged 71) Aizawl, Mizoram, India
- Party: Rakhine Nationalities Development Party Arakan League for Democracy; Arakan National Party United League of Arakan
- Education: Yangon Institute of Technology
- Occupation: Politician

U Oo Hla Saw (Rakhine: ဦးဦးလှစော; born 27 May 1953 – died 5 May 2025), also known by his pen name Maung Khine Aung, was a Rakhine politician, poet, writer and – in later years – political member of Arakan Army (AA). Over a long career, he served as member of the lower house of Myanmar’s parliament, as a leader of various Rakhine‑ethnic political parties and finally as AA’s Political Director.

== Early life ==
U Hla Saw was born in Mrauk‑U, Rakhine State, to parents U Aung Hla Zan and Daw San Thar Phyu. He was reportedly their eldest son. He completed his primary education at an elementary village Primary School in Sittwe.

Early in his life, he became involved in student activism. By the mid‑1970s he was active in student unions and had associations with left‑wing political circles. Over time, his political orientation shifted toward representing ethnic‑Rakhine interests. He passed the university entrance exam with honors in three subjects and was granted admission to the Yangon Institute of Technology, but was expelled for two years due to his involvement in political activities.

U Hla Saw was sentenced to 9 years in prison in 1975 and 14 years in 1988 by a military court for political activity.

== Political career ==
In 1990, U Oo Hla Saw joined the Arakan League for Democracy (ALD). However, ALD was later banned (as part of broader suppression of ethnic‑based political activity) by the Myanmar military government. In 2010, he became a founding member of the Rakhine Nationalities Development Party (RNDP), serving as its general secretary.

Following nationwide elections during the transition toward partial civilian governance, U Oo Hla Saw was elected to the national Parliament (Pyithu Hluttaw) representing the Mrauk‑U constituency in Rakhine State. As an MP, he represented Rakhine‑ethnic political interests in the central legislature and was increasingly well-known for his speeches in the parliament. He was a key figure in the Rakhine National Conference held in Kyaukphyu, from 27 April to 1 May 2014.

He additionally expressed interest for building positive relations with the Kachin people. He raised concerns about the large Chinese oil terminal on Ma Day Island. Despite the development, the nearby Rakhine villages remain very poor with bad roads and low living standards.

After the military coup in Myanmar on 1 February 2021 and the collapse of elected institutions, many ethnic‑Rakhine politicians reconsidered their strategies. Hla Saw, then joined the Arakan Army. From 2022 and onwards, he served as the Political Director of AA's Central Political Department. He attended the junta-organised Union Day event which was held in Naypyidaw being representative to the ULA.

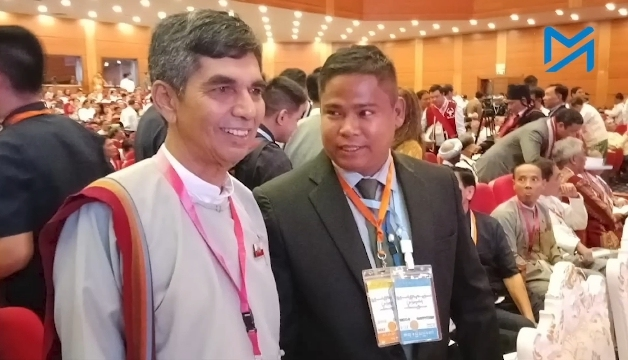
Oo Hla Saw with Arakan Army deputy leader Nyo Twan Awng

In an interview with The Diplomat in June 2024, Oo Hla Saw, noted the Arakan Army's success is due to many factors with strong leadership is the key. He remarked that unlike earlier Rakhine political groups, the AA’s leadership stands out.

== Writing career ==
During his middle school years, U Oo Hla Saw admitted that he was weak in the Burmese language. He served as an editor for magazines such as Rakhine Tansaung (published by Yangon University) and Rakhine RouMa Magazine. He also worked as an editor for private monthly literary journals and even served as an editor for the Federal Journal. Oo Hla Saw wrote across fiction, poetry, and political literature, and published 11 books. He received awards such as the Yangon Institute of Technology Short Story Prize and the Moe Moe Inlay Memorial First Prize.

== Death ==
He had been suffering from throat cancer since around 2023 and was receiving treatment.

On the night of 5 May 2025, U Oo Hla Saw died at approximately 11:45 p.m. in a hospital in Mizoram State of India, after receiving treatment for throat cancer. He was 72 years old at the time of his death. His passing drew public condolences from the Foreign Affairs Minister of the National Unity Government (NUG). The AA/ULA issued an official statement mourning his death.
