= Sittwe University =

University in Myanmar

Coordinates: 20.144°N 92.862°E

- စစ်တွေတက္ကသိုလ်
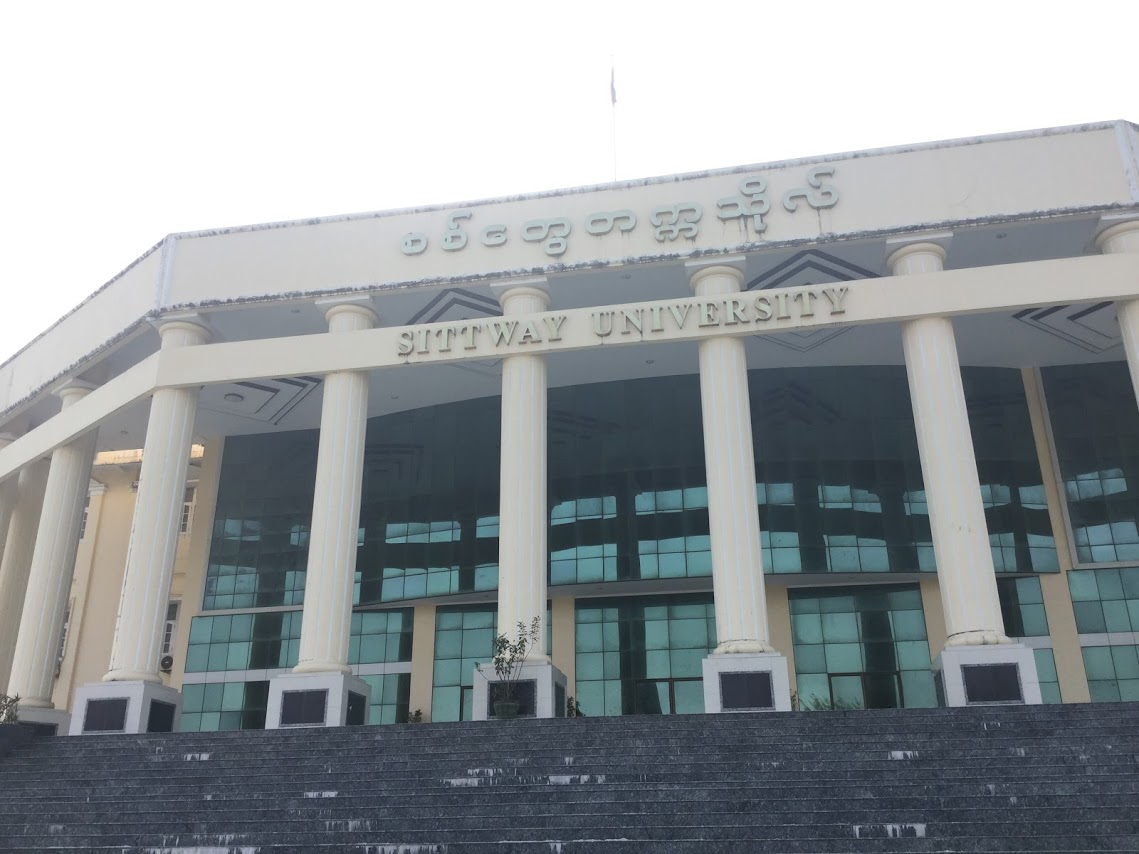
- Former names: Kyaukpyu Intermediate College; Sittway College; Rakhine State Regional College; Sittway Degree College; Sittway University
- Type: Public
- Established: September 18, 1996; 29 years ago
- Principal: Dr. Khin Maung Zaw
- Location: Sittwe, Rakhine State, Myanmar
- Website: http://www.stu.edu.mm

Sittwe University (Burmese: စစ်တွေတက္ကသိုလ်; also spelled as Sittway University) is a public university located in Sittwe, the capital of Rakhine State, Myanmar. It is one of the main universities in the state.

== History ==
After Myanmar gained independence, Kyaukpyu Intermediate College was opened on June 30, 1954, during the AFPFL government. It was the first college in Rakhine State. However, due to low student enrollment, the college was closed on July 31, 1963. Subsequently, students from Rakhine State had to travel to cities like Yangon and Pathein to pursue higher education.

Later, under the Revolutionary Council Government, a two-year Sittway College was opened on September 7, 1973. The Director General of the Higher Education Department at the time, U San Tha Aung, successfully inaugurated the college. The first principal of Sittway College was U Aung Myint.

On March 23, 1977, the college was renamed as Rakhine State Regional College under the supervision of the Rakhine State People's Council. Then on April 1, 1980, it was reverted to Sittway College.

On February 12, 1986, Union Day, the college was upgraded from a two-year to a four-year program and became Sittway Degree College, in honor of Rakhine State.

Later, on September 18, 1996, the degree college was further upgraded to Sittway University.

As of 2022, Sittway University offers both day and distance learning programs, with courses in 18 academic departments.

Water Festival is held at Sittwe University every year, featuring performances by Rakhine singers like Khaing Min Hein, Min Min Chey, and Ye Myat Kyaw. The event has been celebrated since 2019 in the university.

In 2020, the university was not closed timely despite the increase of COVID-19 infections which received criticism.

Sittwe University remained as the only university of Rakhine state on the list of universities eligible for 2024 university entrance applications by the military council of Myanmar.

In 2025, the Rakhine State Government held a ceremony for the 78th Union Day at Sittwe University, attended by officials and students. The event included speeches about national unity, ethnic identity, and sense of union spirit. Financial assistance for teaching materials was also provided to the university by government.

== Faculties and departments ==
=== Bachelor of Arts (B.A.) ===
- Myanmar
- English
- Geography
- History
- Philosophy
- Psychology
- Law
- Oriental Studies
- Applied Myanmar
- Literature
- Business Management

=== Bachelor of Science (B.Sc.) ===
- Chemistry
- Physics
- Mathematics
- Botany
- Zoology
- Geology
- Biochemistry
- Microbiology
- Nuclear Science

=== Bachelor of Law (LL.B.) ===
- Law

== Enrollment ==
Sittwe University has approximately of 2,600 students.

In 2022, more than 100 Muslim students from Maungdaw District were allowed to admit to the university in that academic year. More than 300 students apply to the university every year in Rakhine state.

== Gallery ==
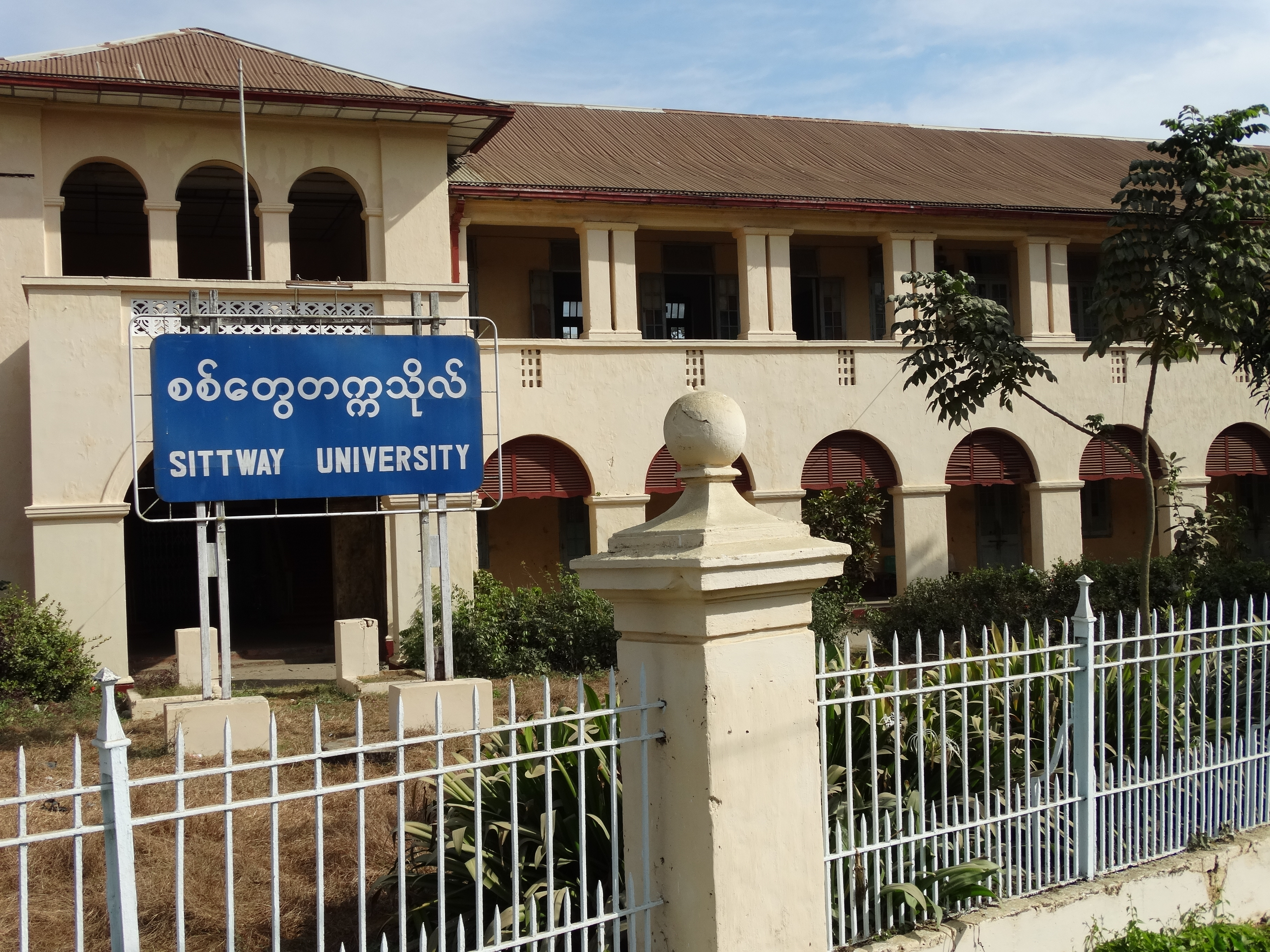
Facade of the university

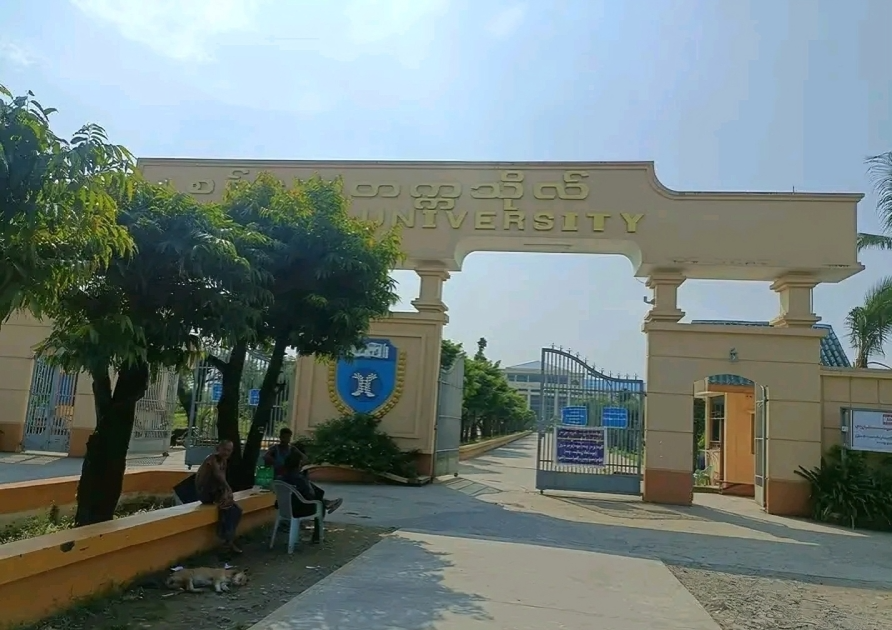
University entry gate

== Alumni ==
- Kyaw Kyaw Win
- Kyaw Thein
- Maung Kyaw Zan
- Myint Naing
- Twan Mrat Naing

== See also ==
- Technological University, Sittwe
- Yangon University of Foreign Languages
- List of universities in Myanmar
