= Kyaw Kyaw =

Burmese politician

Member of the Amyotha Hluttaw
- Incumbent
- Assumed office 31 January 2011
- Constituency: Rakhine State No.2

Member of the Amyotha Hluttaw
- Incumbent
- Assumed office 1 February 2016
- Constituency: Rakhine State No.4

Personal details
- Born: 8 July 1950 (age 76) Mrauk U, Rakhine State, Burma (Myanmar)
- Party: Rakhine National Party
- Spouse: Ma Ohn Myint
- Parent(s): Thar Wai (father); Sein Nyut Phyu (mother)
- Education: Yangon University B.A(L.L.B)

Kyaw Kyaw (Burmese: ကျော်ကျော် ်, born 8 July 1950) is a Burmese politician who currently serves as an Amyotha Hluttaw MP for Rakhine State No. 4 Constituency. He is a member of Rakhine National Party.

In the 2010 Myanmar general election, he was elected as an Amyotha Hluttaw MP and elected representative from Rakhine State № 2 parliamentary constituency.

== Early life and education ==
He was born on 7 July 1950 in Mrauk U, Rakhine State, Burma. He graduated with B.A(L.L.B) from Yangon University. His previous job is a lawyer.

== Political career ==
He is a member of the Rakhine National Party. In the Myanmar general election, 2015, he was elected as an Amyotha Hluttaw MP and elected representative from Rakhine State № 4 parliamentary constituency .
