= Kyaw Kyaw Win =

Burmese politician and lawyer

U Kyaw Kyaw win
- ကျော်ကျော်ဝင်း

Member of the House of Nationalities
- In office 3 February 2016 – 1 February 2021
- Constituency: Rakhine state № 8

Personal details
- Born: 10 December 1978 (age 47) Pauktaw Township, Rakhine State, Myanmar
- Party: Arakan National Party
- Parent: Kyaw Thar (father)
- Education: Sittwe University

U Kyaw Kyaw Win (ဦးကျော်ကျော်ဝင်း; born 10 December 1978) is a Burmese politician and lawyer who served as a House of Nationalities member of parliament for Rakhine State No. 8 constituency. He is a member of the Arakan National Party.

== Early life and education ==
Kyaw Kyaw Win was born on 10 December 1978 in Pauktaw Township, Rakhine State, Myanmar. He graduated with B.A (L.L.B) from distance education at Sittwe University. He worked Senior lawyer in the Maungdaw Township.

== Political career ==
He is a member of the Arakan National Party, he was elected as an Amyotha Hluttaw MP and elected representative from Arakan No. 8 parliamentary constituency.
