= RNDP =

RNDP may stand for

- National Rally for Development and Progress, a political party in Chad
- Rakhine Nationalities Development Party, a political party in Myanmar
- Radon Decay Product, a short-lived radioisotopes Po-218, Pb-214, Bi-214 and Po-214
