= Maung Kyaw Zan =

Burmese politician

Member of the Amyotha Hluttaw
- Incumbent
- Assumed office 1 February 2016
- Constituency: Rakhine State No.9

Personal details
- Born: 17 December 1964 (age 61) Rathedaung, Rakhine State, Burma (Myanmar)
- Party: Rakhine National Party
- Spouse: Tin Tin Nu
- Children: Bhone Myat Hlaing, Ray Zway Khine
- Parent(s): Pain Maung (father); Oo Sein Mya (mother)
- Education: B.A(History) Sittwe University

Maung Kyaw Zan (Burmese: မောင်ကျော်ဇံ, born 17 December 1964) is a Burmese politician and currently serves as an Amyotha Hluttaw MP for Rakhine State No. 9 Constituency. He is a member of Rakhine National Party.

== Early life and education ==
He was born on 17 December 1964 in Rathedaung, Rakhine State, Burma(Myanmar). He graduated with B.A(History) from Sittwe University.

== Political career ==
He is a member of the Rakhine National Party. In the Myanmar general election, 2015, he was elected as an Amyotha Hluttaw MP and elected representative from Rakhine State No. 9 parliamentary constituency. He also serves as a member of Amyotha Hluttaw Ethnic Affairs Committee.
