= Kyaw Thein =

Burmese politician

Member of the Amyotha Hluttaw
- Incumbent
- Assumed office 1 February 2016
- Constituency: Rakhine State No.7

Personal details
- Born: 11 March 1954 (age 72) Maungdaw, Rakhine State, Burma (Myanmar)
- Party: Union Solidarity and Development Party
- Spouse: Shwe Nyut
- Parent(s): Aung Shwe(father); Ma Thein Khaing (mother)
- Education: B.A. (L.L.B) Sittwe University

Kyaw Thein (Burmese: ကျော်သိန်း, born 11 March 1954) is a Burmese politician who currently serves as an Amyotha Hluttaw MP for Rakhine State No. 7 Constituency. He is a member of Union Solidarity and Development Party.

== Early life and education ==
He was born on 11 March 1954 in Maungdaw, Rakhine State, Burma (Myanmar). He graduated with B.A(L.L.B) from Sittwe University.

== Political career ==
He is a member of the Union Solidarity and Development Party. In the Myanmar general election, 2015, he was elected as an Amyotha Hluttaw MP and elected representative from Rakhine State No. 7 parliamentary constituency.
