= U Oo Tha Tun =

Rakhine politician (1917-1990)

- ဦးဦးသာထွန်း

Personal details
- Born: November 23, 1917 Mrauk U, Arakan State, Burma
- Died: August 14, 1990 (aged 72) Sittwe, Rakhine State, Burma
- Party: Arakan League for Democracy
- Occupation: Archaeologist, Politician

Sayargyi U Oo Tha Tun (Burmese: ဦးဦးသာထွန်း; born 23 November 1917 - died 14 August 1990) was a Rakhine archeologist, politician and historian. He is known for documenting historical information about the Rakhine people and for co-founding the Arakan League for Democracy (ALD).

== Early life ==
U Oo Tha Tun was born on 23 November, 1917, in Mrauk-U, Arakan State, Burma. After the death of his father, he was forced to leave school during his ninth grade. Later, he continued his education independently by studying Sanskrit, history, astrology, and archaeology under the guidance of his grandfather and other local mentors. From 1950 to 1955, he worked as a primary school teacher before joining the archaeological department in Mrauk-U, where he served from 1955 until 1977. He later continued as an advisor to the department from 1977 to 1983 and took part in the excavation of the ancient city of Waithali. However, later he eventually stepped away from archaeology and entered politics, believing it was his responsibility to contribute to the advancement of Rakhine nationalism.

== Political career ==
Under his leadership, the Arakan League for Democracy (ALD) gained strong support under his leadership among the Arakanese population. He travelled widely across Arakan State, speaking about the glory days of the Arakanese Kingdom and openly advocating for Arakanese nationalism.

In the following Myanmar 1990 general election, U Oo Tha Tun took campaign tours throughout the region. He visited towns such as Sittwe, Maungdaw, Mrauk-U, Kyauktaw, and Minbya, asking for votes. In the 1990 general election, he became a candidate for the Lower House in Kyauktaw Township for the Arakan League for Democracy. As his popularity grew in Arakan politics, the Myanmar military began watching his speeches closely. Some of his close friends and supporters advised him to escape to Bangladesh, but he refused.

Eventually he was later arrested in Sittwe. On May 22, 1990, local authorities sentenced him to prison under Section 5(j) of the Emergency Provisions Act. He was one of the first people in Arakan State to be imprisoned for political activities under this law. After his arrest, voters in Kyauktaw supported the Mro (Khami) National Unity Party in the 1990 election due to his absence.

== Death ==
He died in Sittwe prison on August 14, 1990, from high blood pressure and a brain haemorrhage. His ashes were taken to his hometown, Mrauk-U, and buried near the Shitthaung Temple.

=== Aftermath ===
Following the death of U Oo Tha Tun, the junta recognised only the party’s original 12 leaders and refused to accept newer members who had strengthened the organisation after its formation. Those recognised leaders were also subjected to pressure from the military to abandon the ALD. In the general election held on May 27, 1990, the National League for Democracy, led by Aung San Suu Kyi, secured a landslide victory by winning 392 of the 492 contested seats nationwide. Despite the results, the military government headed by Saw Maung refused to acknowledge the results and did not convene parliament. In Arakan State, the Arakan League for Democracy got 11 of the 27 available seats in the 1990 election. By March 6, 1992, only four members of the ALD Central Committee remained, leading to the party’s dissolution. Locals have regarded the death of U Oo Tha Tun as the turning point that marked the decline of the ALD.

=== Legacy ===
U Oo Tha Tun Day is observed by local Rakhine communities on 14 August to mark the anniversary of his death.
