= Saw Mra Razar Lin =

Burmese politician

- စောမြရာဇာလင်း

Chairperson of the Arakan Liberation Party (disputed)
- Incumbent
- Assumed office March 2023
- Preceded by: Khaing Ye Khaing

Personal details
- Born: Kyaukphyu, Rakhine State, Burma
- Occupation: Politician, former revolutionary
- Known for: First woman peace negotiator representing an EAO in Myanmar
- Awards: Yayori Award (2007); Zeya Kyaw Thu (2023); Wunna Kyaw Htin (2025)

Military service
- Affiliation: National United Front of Arakan
- Years of service: 1988–2012

Saw Mra Razar Lin, also known as Saw Mya Yarzar Lin (Burmese: စောမြရာဇာလင်း) is an Arakanese politician, former revolutionary soldier, and one of the two rival leaders claiming the chairmanship of the Arakan Liberation Party (ALP) following an internal split in 2023. She worked as a schoolteacher before taking up arms following the failed 8888 Uprising. In 2012, she became the first woman to formally participate in peace negotiations between the Myanmar government and the country's ethnic armed organizations (EAOs).

The 2021 military coup and the subsequent collapse of the formal peace process created deep strategic divisions among the EAOs, a fragmentation reflected in her own party. In 2023, a schism within the ALP resulted in two competing factions, with Saw Mya Yarzar Lin emerging as the self-appointed chairperson of the faction that chose to continue political engagement with the new military regime, the State Administration Council (SAC).

== Political career ==
=== Rebel life ===
Before entering politics, Saw Mya Yarzar Lin worked as a schoolteacher in her hometown of Kyaukphyu, located in western Myanmar's Rakhine State (formerly Arakan State). Her political engagement began during the 1988 pro-democracy uprising. During the uprising, she became active in the movement, participating in political mobilization efforts in the state capital, Sittwe. Following the military's suppression of the protests, she, along with many others, fled to the country's border regions, where she joined armed resistance movements opposing the military government. When martial law was declared in Burma in September 1988, the State Law and Order Restoration Council (SLORC) issued an order for the arrest of Saw Mya Yarzar Lin, dead or alive.

After leaving her home in Kyaukphyu, Saw Mya Yarzar Lin traveled to the Bangladesh–Myanmar border, where she joined the underground armed wing of the Arakanese resistance. Her initial involvement was with the National United Front of Arakan (NUFA), a group engaged in armed opposition to the central government. NUFA encountered significant logistical difficulties in the remote and mountainous border region, including shortages of food and weapons, and was eventually disbanded. Following the group's dissolution, she traveled to Thailand with the objective of acquiring arms to support the movement.

=== Return and involvement in the Arakan Liberation Party ===
Saw Mya Yarzar Lin lived in exile for approximately 24 years, from around 1988 until her return to Myanmar in 2012. She served as chairperson of the Rakhine Women Union (RWU), a Bangladesh-based organization, and continued to hold a position as a central committee member of the Arakan Liberation Party (ALP). Following the political reforms initiated by the quasi-civilian government of President Thein Sein, she was invited to return to Myanmar in late 2012. She re-entered the country from Bangladesh through the Maungdaw–Teknaf border crossing and was received at the Sittwe jetty by an estimated crowd of 600 people.

Upon her return, she outlined three primary objectives: to implement her political plans, to deliver personal donations for conflict-affected communities, and to establish official liaison offices for the Arakan Liberation Party (ALP) in Rakhine State, in line with agreements made with the government. As part of her reintegration strategy, she met with President Thein Sein, National League for Democracy (NLD) leader Aung San Suu Kyi, members of the 88 Generation Students Group, and representatives from Rakhine-based political parties, including the Rakhine Nationalities Development Party (RNDP).

=== As a peace negotiator ===
Saw Mya Yarzar Lin became the first woman to represent the Arakan Liberation Party (ALP) in formal peace negotiations with the government of Myanmar in 2012. Her involvement was a unique instance of a woman participating in a negotiation process that has historically been dominated by male representatives of ethnic armed groups and the government. Subsequently, Naw Zipporah Sein, vice-chairperson of the Karen National Union, also participated in the talks.

Saw Mya Yarzar Lin played a significant role in the peace process that led to the signing of the Nationwide Ceasefire Agreement (NCA) in 2015, to which the Arakan Liberation Party (ALP) was a signatory. In 2013, she was appointed as one of the Arakanese representatives to the Nationwide Ceasefire Coordination Team (NCCT), the main ethnic negotiating bloc involved in drafting the agreement. She participated in multiple high-level meetings focused on the framework and implementation of the NCA, engaging with senior government officials, including Union Minister Aung Min and, later, Lieutenant General Yar Pyae of the State Administration Council's peace committee following the 2021 military coup.

=== ALP split ===
During this period, Saw Mya Yarzar Lin advocated for the expansion of ALP liaison offices within Rakhine State. Her political strategy prioritized negotiation and continued engagement with the government, in contrast to other groups that shifted toward armed resistance following the 2021 military coup. This stance became a point of internal disagreement within the Arakan Liberation Party (ALP) and contributed to a formal split within the organization. The division resulted in two competing factions. One opposed the military junta and supported alignment with the broader anti-coup resistance movement. The other, led by Saw Mya Yarzar Lin, supported continued dialogue with the military authorities and maintained a commitment to the existing Nationwide Ceasefire Agreement (NCA) framework.

In January 2022, a faction within the Arakan Liberation Party (ALP), including Chairman Khaing Ye Khaing and then–Vice Chairperson Saw Mya Yarzar Lin, jointly expelled Vice Chairman Khaing Soe Naing Aung, accusing him of attempting to establish a new political party. Following this internal restructuring, Khaing Ye Khaing was no longer listed among the party's leadership.

On 5 March 2023, Saw Mya Yarzar Lin issued a statement announcing the formation of a new leadership group within the ALP and declared herself the party's new chairperson. She also named Khaing Ni Aung as vice chairman. This move was immediately contested by the existing ALP leadership, led by Chairman Khaing Ye Khaing and General Secretary Khaing Kyaw Khaing. On 20 March 2023, they issued a counter-statement rejecting the restructuring as "illegitimate" and declared that Saw Mya Yarzar Lin had been formally expelled from the party for violating its internal rules and procedures.

The political alignment of Saw Mya Yarzar Lin's faction placed it in direct opposition to the Arakan Army (AA), which has become the dominant force in Arakanese nationalism. Tensions escalated in mid-2024 when the AA accused the Arakan Liberation Army (ALA), the armed wing of the Arakan Liberation Party (ALP), of collaborating with the Tatmadaw in committing war crimes during a village massacre in Sittwe Township.

== Awards and honors ==
In August 2007, Saw Mya Yarzar Lin received the Yayori Award from the Women's Fund for Peace and Human Rights and the Asia-Japan Women's Resource Center, in recognition of her sustained contributions to the promotion of peace and democracy in Myanmar.

On 17 November 2023, Saw Mya Yarzar Lin was conferred the honorary title of Zeya Kyaw Thu by the military government in recognition of her service.

On 2 July 2025, Saw Mya Yarzar Lin was awarded the title of Wunna Kyaw Htin, one of Myanmar's highest civilian honors, by the State Administration Council (SAC).
