= Government Technical Institute (Pyay) =

Institute of higher education in Myanmar

- အစိုးရစက်မှုလက်မှုသိပ္ပံ (ပြည်)
- Location: Pyay, Bago Division, Myanmar

The Government Technical Institute, Pyay (Burmese: အစိုးရစက်မှုလက်မှုသိပ္ပံ (ပြည်)) was an institute of technology and engineering located in Pyay, Bago Division, Burma. It could graduate only Diploma of Technical.

Some Burmese politicians, such as Ko Ko Gyi and Kyaw Zaw Oo, did their post-high-school studies at the Government Technical Institute (Pyay).

== History ==
The Government Technical Institute (Pyay) was founded in 1972. During military junta days, its campus was taken by the government.

== Departments ==
- Department of Civil Engineering
- Department of Electronic and Communication Engineering
- Department of Electrical Power Engineering

== Programs ==
Graduate Program	Degree	year
Diploma of Civil Engineering	A.G.T.I. (Civil)	3 years
Diploma of Electronic and Communication Engineering	A.G.T.I. (EC)	3 years
Diploma of Electrical Power Engineering	A.G.T.I. (EP)	3 years

== See also ==
- Yenangyaung Government Technical Institute
