= Aye Nu Sein =

Burmese lawyer and politician

Sithu Aye Nu Sein
- အေးနုစိန်

Member of the State Administration Council
- In office 3 February 2021 – 1 February 2023

Vice-chair of the Arakan National Party

Personal details
- Born: 24 March 1957 (age 69) Akyab, Burma
- Party: Arakan National Party (?-present)
- Occupation: Politician; lawyer

Aye Nu Sein (Burmese: အေးနုစိန်, born 24 March 1957 in Sittwe) is a Burmese lawyer and politician. An ethnic Rakhine, she is vice-chair of the Arakan National Party, and a former member of Myanmar's State Administration Council, from 2021 to 2023. She was appointed to the council on 3 February 2021, in the aftermath of the 2021 Myanmar coup d'état. In November 2022, she was awarded the title of Thiri Pyanchi, one of the country's highest honors.
