= Arakan Front Party =

Arakan Front Party ရခိုင့်ဦးဆောင်ပါတီ
- Abbreviation: AFP
- Leader: Aye Maung
- Chairperson: Aye Maung
- Vice Chairperson: Kyaw Zaw Oo
- Spokesperson: Kyaw Zaw Oo
- Secretaries: Soe Win; Tin Maung Win; Tun Thein
- Founders: Aye Maung; Kyaw Zaw Oo; Tin Maung Win
- Founded: 11 October 2018
- Headquarters: Sittwe, Rakhine State
- Ideology: Arakanese self-determination Anti-Rohingya; Anti-Islam; Ultranationalism
- Political position: Right-wing to Far-right
- Slogan: "ရဲရင့်အသံရှင် ၊ မုန်တိုင်းပင်ဖြတ်သန်း ၊ အောင်ပွဲလှမ်းချီ ၊ ရခိုင့်ဦးဆောင်ပါတီ"
- Seats in the House of Nationalities: 3 / 224
- Seats in the House of Representatives: 0 / 440
- Seats in the Rakhine State Hluttaw: 2 / 47

Website
- Arakan Front blog

The Arakan Front Party (Burmese: ရခိုင့်ဦးဆောင်ပါတီ, romanized: r hko ng u saung parte; abbreviated AFP) is a political party in Myanmar seeking Arakanese self-determination and holding hardline ultranationalist, anti-Rohingya and anti-Islam stances. It was founded on 11 October 2018 by Dr. Aye Maung, former chairman of the Arakan National Party, and his colleagues, including his son Tin Maung Win.

== History ==
The AFP announced on 29 March 2020 that the party had elected a new leadership consisting of Aye Maung as chairperson, Kyaw Zaw Oo as Vice Chairperson, and Soe Win, Tin Maung Win, Tun Thein and Than Naing as secretaries. However, some members could not take their new leadership roles because their former party, the Arakan National Party, refused to let them resign and join the AFP. Aye Maung and Kyaw Zaw Oo are both known to be hardline nationalists.

In the 2020 general election, the AFP fielded its candidates in 42 constituencies. After the Union Election Commission cancelled the election in most of Rakhine State, the AFP's number of candidates was consequently reduced to three contesting in the House of Nationalities, five in the House of Representatives and ten in the Rakhine State Hluttaw. Out of these 18 contested seats, the AFP won one seat in the House of Representatives and two seats in the Rakhine State Hluttaw.

The AFP declined an offer by the Tatmadaw, which overthrew the elected government of Myanmar in a military coup on 1 February 2021, to accept a cabinet minister position in the State Administration Council.

In late 2022, Arakan Army, the Arakanese ethnic armed group battling the junta detained two high leaders of AFP, Kyaw Zaw Oo and Kyaw Lwin. They are currently still in detainment and the Arakan Army stated that they are interned in one of their military regions in Rakhine state and refused to disclose the reason of their detainment.

In 2023, Aye Maung stated that AFP would take part in the regime's planned potential elections and went to register in junta's electoral commission. Later on, Aye Maung also met two members of the Japanese parliament and lobbied for the junta in Japan. The leader of the junta, Min Aung Hlaing awarded Aye Maung the Wunna Kyawhtin title, a high order of merit award in January 2023.

== Election results ==
=== House of Nationalities (Amyotha Hluttaw) ===
Election	Leader	Total seats won	Total votes	Share of votes	+/-	Status
2020	Aye Maung	0 / 224	27,099	0.10%	New	Not recognised
2025–26	Aye Maung	3 / 224	24,457	0.19%	▲3	TBA

=== House of Representatives (Pyithu Hluttaw) ===
Election	Leader	Total seats won	Total votes	Share of votes	+/-	Status
2020	Aye Maung	1 / 440	39,821	0.15%	New	Not recognised
2025–26	Aye Maung	0 / 440	22,567	0.17%	▼1	Extra-parliamentary
