= Aye Maung =

Burmese politician

Dr. Aye Maung
- အေးမောင်
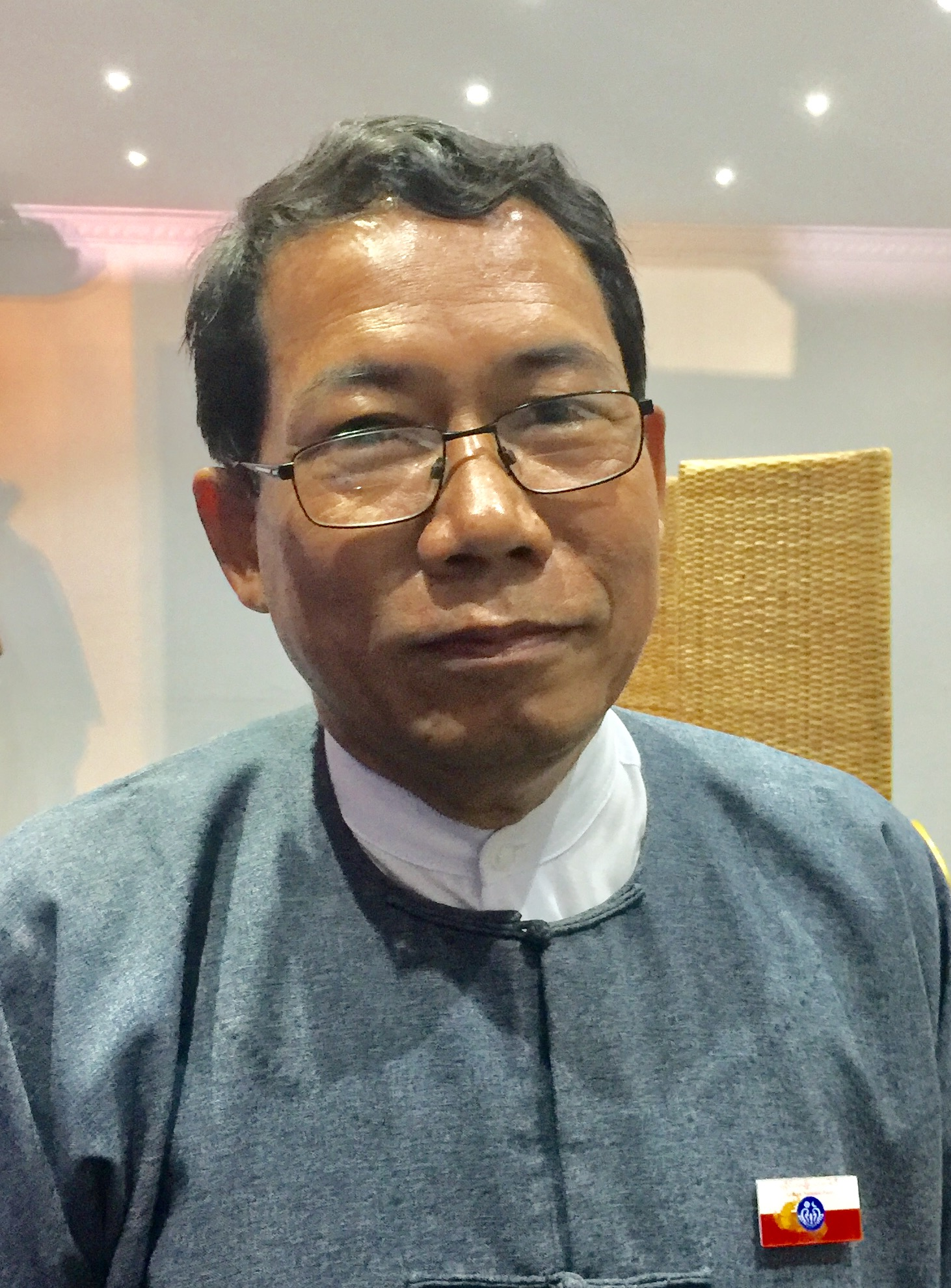

Member of the Pyithu Hluttaw for Ann
- In office 2 April 2017 – 20 May 2020
- Preceded by: Thein Swe
- Constituency: Ann

Member of the Amyotha Hluttaw
- In office 1 February 2011 – 31 January 2016
- Preceded by: Constituency established
- Succeeded by: Maung Thin
- Constituency: Rakhine State No. 1

Personal details
- Born: 1 November 1957 (age 68) Aung Seik Village, Rathedaung Township, Rakhine State
- Party: Arakan Front Party (2018–present); Rakhine Nationalities Development Party (2010–2014); Arakan National Party (2014–2017); Independent (2017–2018)
- Occupation: Politician

Aye Maung (Burmese: အေးမောင် [ʔé màʊɴ]) is a Burmese politician and was the chairperson of the Arakan National Party, one of Myanmar's ethnic political parties. He is currently the leader of the Arakan Front Party. He is a staunch nationalist known for his hardline stance against the Rohingya people, having tirelessly campaigned against the minority group and having been involved in instigating attacks against them in the communal violence in 2012.

== Political career ==
=== Political beginning ===
An ex-veterinarian, Aye Maung's political career began when he formed and chaired the Rakhine Nationalities Development Party to contest the 2010 general elections in Rakhine State. His party contested all the electoral seats available for the state in both Houses of Parliament and the state legislature, and won 35 out of 44 seats in the elections. Aye Maung personally won a seat for the Rakhine State No.1 constituency in the Amyotha Hluttaw, and assumed his role as member of parliament on 1 February 2011.

=== Bid for Chief Minister ===
In the run-up to the 2015 general elections, Aye Maung announced his intentions to secure the position of Chief Minister for his party, as well as to dominate the state legislature, in a direct challenge to the two main contenders, the Union Solidarity Development Party and the National League for Democracy. In accordance with the Constitution of Myanmar, the Chief Minister must be selected from among the members of the state legislature, and thus as part of his party's campaign he ran as a candidate for the state legislature in Manaung Township. However, during the elections, he lost the race to the candidate from the National League for Democracy, leading some Arakanese to denounce Manaung residents as traitors to the 'Arakan cause'. Ultimately, his party failed to secure either the position of Chief Minister or a majority in the Rakhine State Hluttaw.

=== Resignation from Arakan National Party ===
Following persistent internal strife within the party, Aye Maung tendered his resignation from the party as both chairman and member on November 27, 2017. The party has yet to make an official statement regarding the approval of his resignation.

On 8 January 2018, the party announced that they would 'suspend' Aye Maung as chairman, despite him having tendered his resignation five weeks prior. The party also stated that it would give him a time to reconsider his resignation from the Arakan National Party.

=== Arrest and release ===
On 18 January 2018, Aye Maung was arrested by the Myanmar Police Force at his home in Sittwe. This followed his attendance at a charity event two days prior in Rathedaung Township to commemorate the 233rd anniversary of the fall of the Kingdom of Mrauk U to the Konbaung dynasty in 1785, in which he allegedly gave a speech urging the Arakan people to "take advantage of the weakness of the government and to march towards the goal of sovereignty". Aye Maung was also scheduled that day to speak at an event in Mrauk U that devolved into violence. The police has announced that they intend to charge Aye Maung for unlawful assembly, as well as for the act of high treason and the incitement of rebellion against the government. He has become the first member of parliament to be arrested since the implementation of the latest constitution in 2008.

On 10 September 2018, the local court in Sittwe charged Aye Maung for high treason and conducting public mischief, while the charge for unlawful assembly was dropped.

On 19 March 2019, Sittwe District Court sentenced him to 20 years for high treason under section 122 of the Myanmar Penal Code and two years for incitement under section 505(b) of the Penal Code, to be served concurrently. The Union Election Commission stripped him of his lawmaker status on 20 May 2020 and barred him from running for future elections.

As part of a general amnesty to commemorate Union Day, Aye Maung was one of 23,000 prisoners conditionally released on 12 February 2021 under the orders of the Chairman of the State Administrative Council. He was awarded the title of Thiri Pyanchi, one of the country's highest honors in November 2022.

== Political views ==
Aye Maung has publicly praised Israel as a model for Rakhine state-building, seeking to apply Israel's control on Palestinians to the Rohingya.
