= Rakhine State Government =

- Flag of Rakhine State

Government overview
- Formed: 30 March 2010
- Jurisdiction: Arakan Parliament
- Headquarters: King Minbar Gyi Street, Sittwe, Rakhine State
- Government executive: U Naing Oo, Government Chief Minister
- Parent department: Rakhine State Government
- Website: www.rakhinestate.gov.mm

Rakhine State Government is the cabinet of Rakhine State. As of 2026, U Naing Oo is chief minister of the state government.

== Cabinet (April 2016–?) ==
No.	Name	Portfolio
(1)	Nyi Pu	Chief Minister
(2)	Min Than, Col.	Minister of Security and Border Affairs
(3)	Kyaw Aye Thein	Minister of Planning, Finance, Tax and Economy
(4)	Kyaw Lwin	Minister of Agriculture, Livestock, Forestry and Mines
(5)	Aung Kyaw Zan	Minister of Electricity, Industry and Transportation
(6)	Win Myint	Minister of Municipal Affairs
(7)	Chan Thar, Dr.	Minister of Social Affairs
(8)	Pon Bway	Minister of Chin Ethnic Affairs
(9)	Kyaw Hla Tun	State Advocate
(10)	Yin Hla	State Auditor

== See also ==
- Rakhine State Hluttaw
- Politics of Myanmar
