= Rakhine State Hluttaw =

Legislature of Rakhine State, Myanmar

Rakhine State Hluttaw ရခိုင်ပြည်နယ်လွှတ်တော်
- 2nd Rakhine State Hluttaw

Type
- Type: Unicameral

History
- Founded: 31 January 2011

Leadership
- Speaker: San Kyaw Hla, ANP since 8 February 2016
- Deputy Speaker: Pho Min, ANP since 8 February 2016

Structure
- Seats: 47; 35 elected MPs; 12 military appointees
- Political groups: Arakan National Party (18) Military (12); National League for Democracy (9)*; Arakan League for Democracy (4); Union Solidarity and Development Party (3) Independent (1)

Elections
- Last election: 8 November 2015

Meeting place
- State Hluttaw Meeting Hall; Sittwe, Rakhine State

Footnotes
- Includes one 'Ethnic Minister (Chin)' from the NLD.

Rakhine State Hluttaw (Burmese: ရခိုင်ပြည်နယ်လွှတ်တော်; lit. 'Rakhine State Assembly') is the legislature of the Rakhine State, Myanmar. It is a unicameral body, consisting of 47 members, including 35 elected members and 12 military representatives. As of February 2016, the Hluttaw was led by speaker San Kyaw Hla of the Arakan National Party (ANP).

Seats of Rakhine State Hluttaw by Parties (November 2010)
| Party | Seats | Seats % |
|---|---|---|
| RNDP | 18 | 38.30 |
| USDP | 14 | 29.79 |
| NDPD | 2 | 4.26 |
| NUP | 1 | 2.12 |
| Military appointees | 12 | 25.53 |
| Total | 47 | 100 |

In 2015 general election, the ANP won the most contested seats in the legislature. However, the ANP did not achieve a majority of seats in the legislature due to the 12 appointed seats for military personnel.

== Hluttaw Seat after General Election (Nov. 2015) ==
| Party | Seats | +/– | Seats % |
|---|---|---|---|
| Arakan National Party (ANP) | 22 | ▲4 | 46.81% |
| National League for Democracy (NLD) | 9 | ▲9 | 19.15% |
| Union Solidarity and Development Party (USDP) | 3 | ▼13 | 6.38% |
| Independent | 1 | ▲1 | 2.13% |
| National Unity Party (NUP) | 0 | ▼1 | |
| Military Appointees | 12 | | 25.53% |
| Total | 47 | | 100% |

== See also ==
- State and Region Hluttaws
- Pyidaungsu Hluttaw
- Rakhine State Government
