= Rakhine Nationalities Development Party =

Rakhine Nationalities Development Party ရခိုင်တိုင်းရင်းသားများတိုးတက်ရေးပါတီ
- President: Dr. Aye Maung
- Secretary: Khaing Pyi Soe
- Founded: 6 May 2010
- Dissolved: 13 January 2014
- Merged into: Arakan National Party
- Headquarters: Sittwe, Rakhine State
- Ideology: Rakhine nationalism
- Religion: Theravada Buddhism

Party flag

Website
- Official website

The Rakhine Nationalities Development Party (Burmese: ရခိုင်တိုင်းရင်းသားများတိုးတက်ရေးပါတီ; abbreviated RNDP) was a political party in Myanmar (Burma), representing the interests of the Rakhine people in Rakhine State and Yangon Region. The party contested 44 seats in the 2010 General Election, of which it won 35. The RNDP was the largest party in the Rakhine State Hluttaw, the sole State or Region Hluttaw whose largest party was not the Union Solidarity and Development Party following the 2010 election. The party was at times accused of stirring up anti-Muslim feelings.

On 7 June 2011, Kyaw Htun Aung, an Amyotha Hluttaw (Chamber of Nationalities) MP, Aung Kyaw Zan, a Pyithu Hluttaw (Chamber of Deputies) MP, and Maung Kyaw Thein, a Rakhine State Hluttaw MP, all representing Pauktaw Township's constituency, were disqualified by the Union Election Commission for allegedly defaming USDP and the State Peace and Development Council during the election campaign. They subsequently filed appeals with the commission, which cost 1 million kyat (US$1,250) to file. On 9 September 2011, the Commission reached a verdict and two of the three accused MPs (Kyaw Htun Aung and Maung Kyaw Thein) won their appeals, while Aung Kyaw Zan lost his seat in the Rakhine State Hluttaw.

On 17 June 2013, The Rakhine Nationalities Development Party and Arakan League for Democracy signed an agreement to merge under the name of Rakhine National Party. With recognition of the new party, the Rakhine Nationalities Development Party was officially dissolved on 6 March 2014.

== 2010 general election ==
The RNDP was specifically formed to contest the 2010 election. The party formally registered with the Union Election Commission on 4 May 2010 and the registration was approved on 6 May. The RNDP national headquarters is located in Sittwe, Rakhine State. The party is headed by chairman Dr. Aye Maung.

The RNDP contested for all seats in Rakhine state and the post of Rakhine Minorities Representative in Yangon Region. Of a total 44 seats contested, it won 35 seats.

It won seven seats in the Amyotha Hluttaw (House of Nationalities) and nine seats in the Pyithu Hluttaw (House of Representatives). It garnered 4.17% in the Amyotha Hluttaw, making it the second largest bloc in the house, after the junta backed Union Solidarity and Development Party (which won 129 seats with 76.79%). In the Pyithu Hluttaw, it came in fifth with nine seats (2.72%). It also won 18 seats in the Rakhine State Assembly.

== See also ==
- Arakan Front Party
- Arakan National Party
- United League of Arakan
- National Democratic Front
