= Arakan National Party =

Arakan National Party ရခိုင်အမျိုးသားပါတီ
- Abbreviation: ANP
- President: Thar Tun Hla
- Secretary: Khaing Pray Soe
- Policy Leadership Committee Member: U Oo Hla Saw, Aye Nu Sein
- Founded: 6 March 2014 (12 years ago)
- Merger of: Rakhine Nationalities Development Party; Arakan League for Democracy (until 2017)
- Headquarters: Sittwe, Rakhine State, Myanmar
- Ideology: Rakhine nationalism Buddhist nationalism Religious nationalism Anti-Islam; Anti-Rohingya
- Political position: Right-wing to far-right
- Religion: Theravada Buddhism
- Colours: White and red
- Seats in the Amyotha Hluttaw: 10 / 224
- Seats in the Pyithu Hluttaw: 12 / 440
- Seats in the Rakhine State Hluttaw: 18 / 47
- Ethnic Affairs Ministers: 1 / 29

Election symbol

The Arakan National Party (Burmese: ရခိုင်အမျိုးသားပါတီ, romanized: rahkineaamyoesarr parte; abbreviated ANP), is a political party in Myanmar (Burma), representing the interests of the Rakhine community in Rakhine and Yangon Region. The party was founded on 13 January 2014 and registered with the Union Election Commission on 6 March 2014. The chairman of the ANP is Thar Htun Hla. The party is known for its hardline ethnic nationalist stance, as well as its Islamophobic and anti-Rohingya ideologies. Some members of the party were involved in instigating violence against Rohingya people during the communal riots in 2012, which left dozens dead and thousands homeless.

== History ==
The Rakhine Nationalities Development Party (RNDP), led by Dr. Aye Maung, and the Arakan League for Democracy (ALD), led by Aye Thar Aung, signed an agreement on 17 June 2013 to merge into a single party under the name "Arakan National Party" after more than eight months of negotiations.

In the 2015 general election, the party contested 63 seats in Rakhine State, Chin State, Ayeyarwady Region, and Yangon Region. The party won 10 seats in Amyotha Hluttaw, 12 in Pyithu Hluttaw, 22 in Rakhine State Hluttaw, and one-party member became the Ethnic Affairs Minister.

Former leaders of the ALD announced on 8 January 2017 that they were splitting from ANP and were re-registering with the Union Election Commission for the 2020 elections, citing internal issues and RNDP dominance in the ANP as the reasons for the split.

On 27 November 2017, Dr. Aye Maung resigned as the party chairman and member, citing persistent conflicts within the top ranks of the party.

On 2 July 2024, the State Administration Council junta's Union Election Commission barred the ANP from taking part in the 2025 election due to alleged links with the Arakha Army.

== See also ==
- Arakan Front Party
- United League of Arakan
- National Democratic Front
