= Rakhine State =

State of Myanmar

Rakhine State ရခိုင်ပြည်နယ် Arakan State
- State

Myanmar transcription(s)
  - Rakhine: Rakhai Pray Nay
  - Burmese: ra.hkuing: prany nai
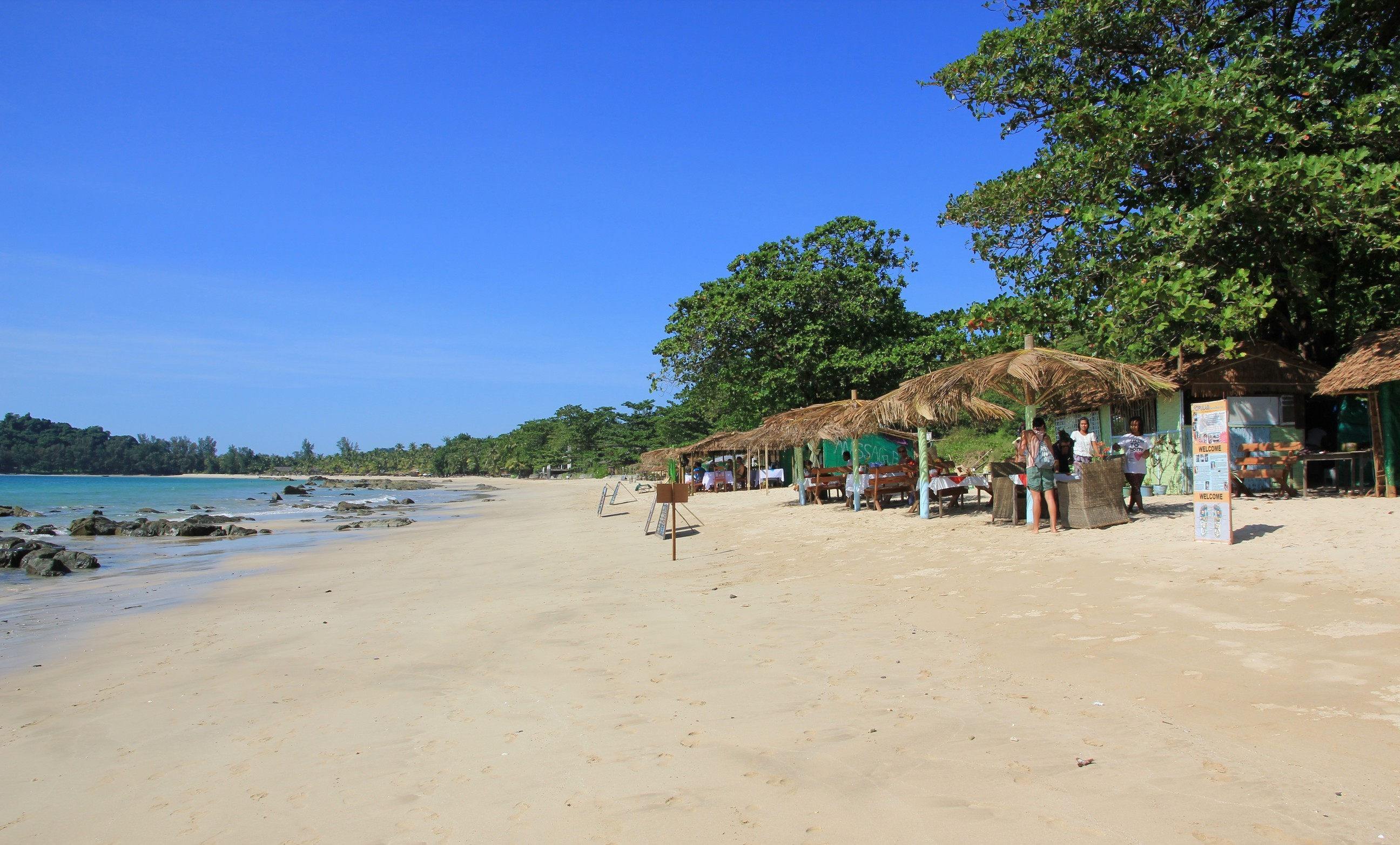
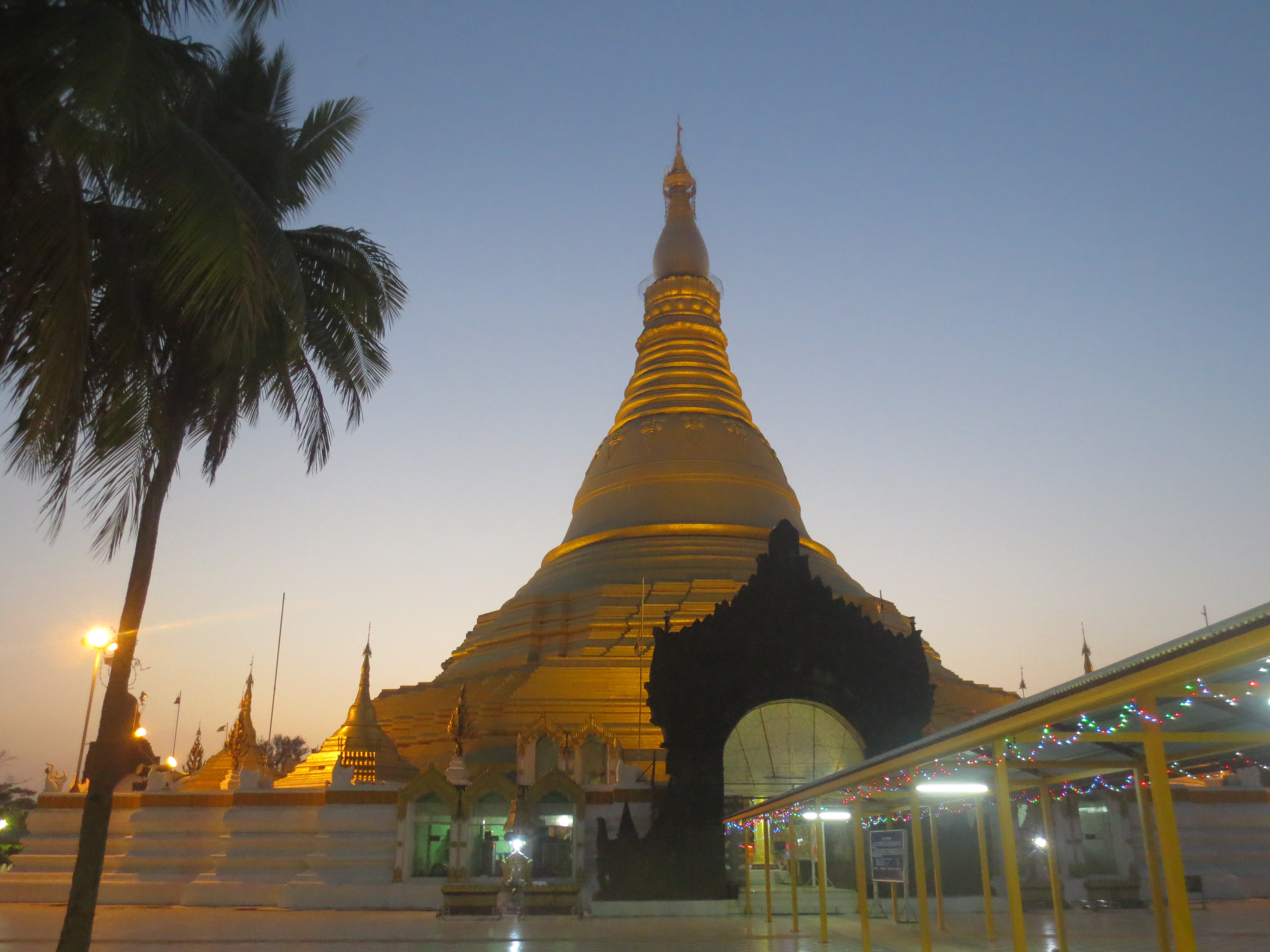
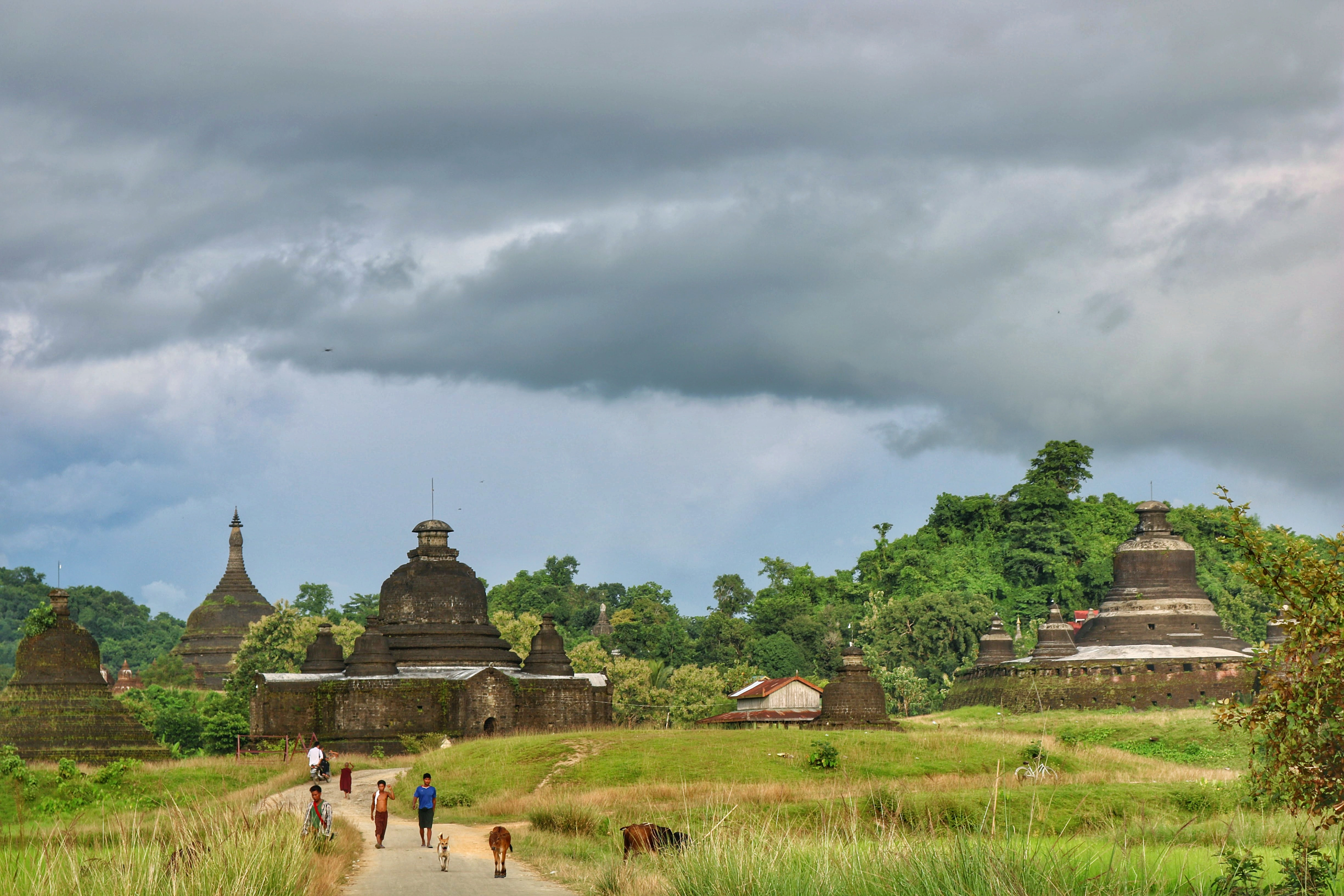
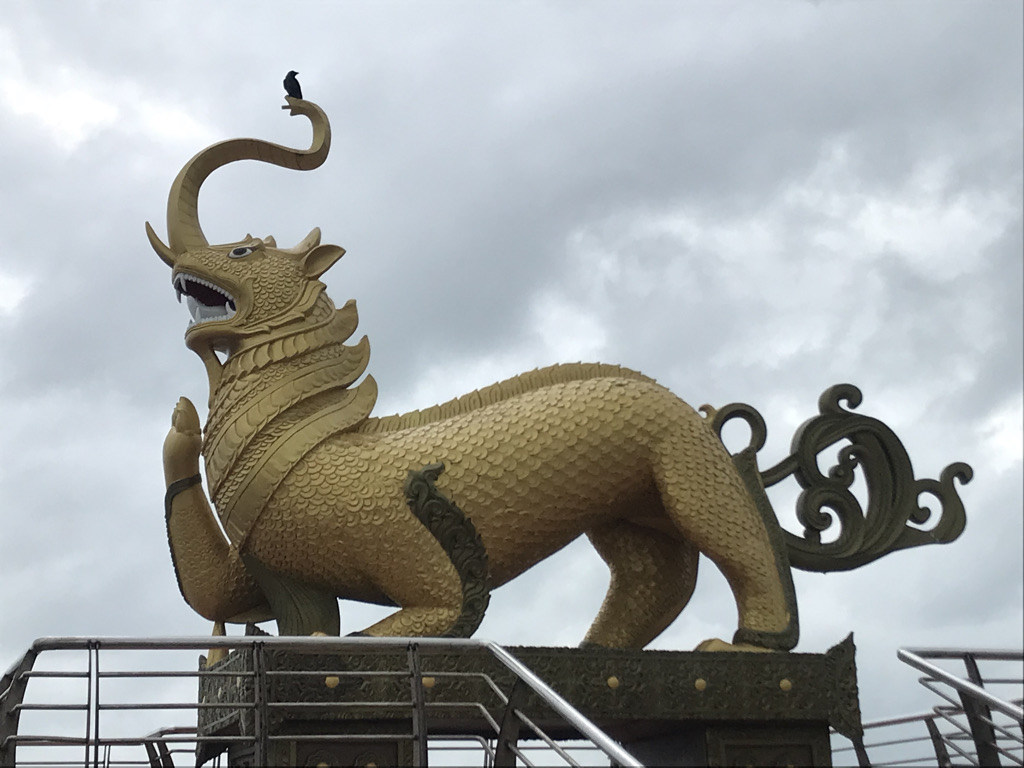
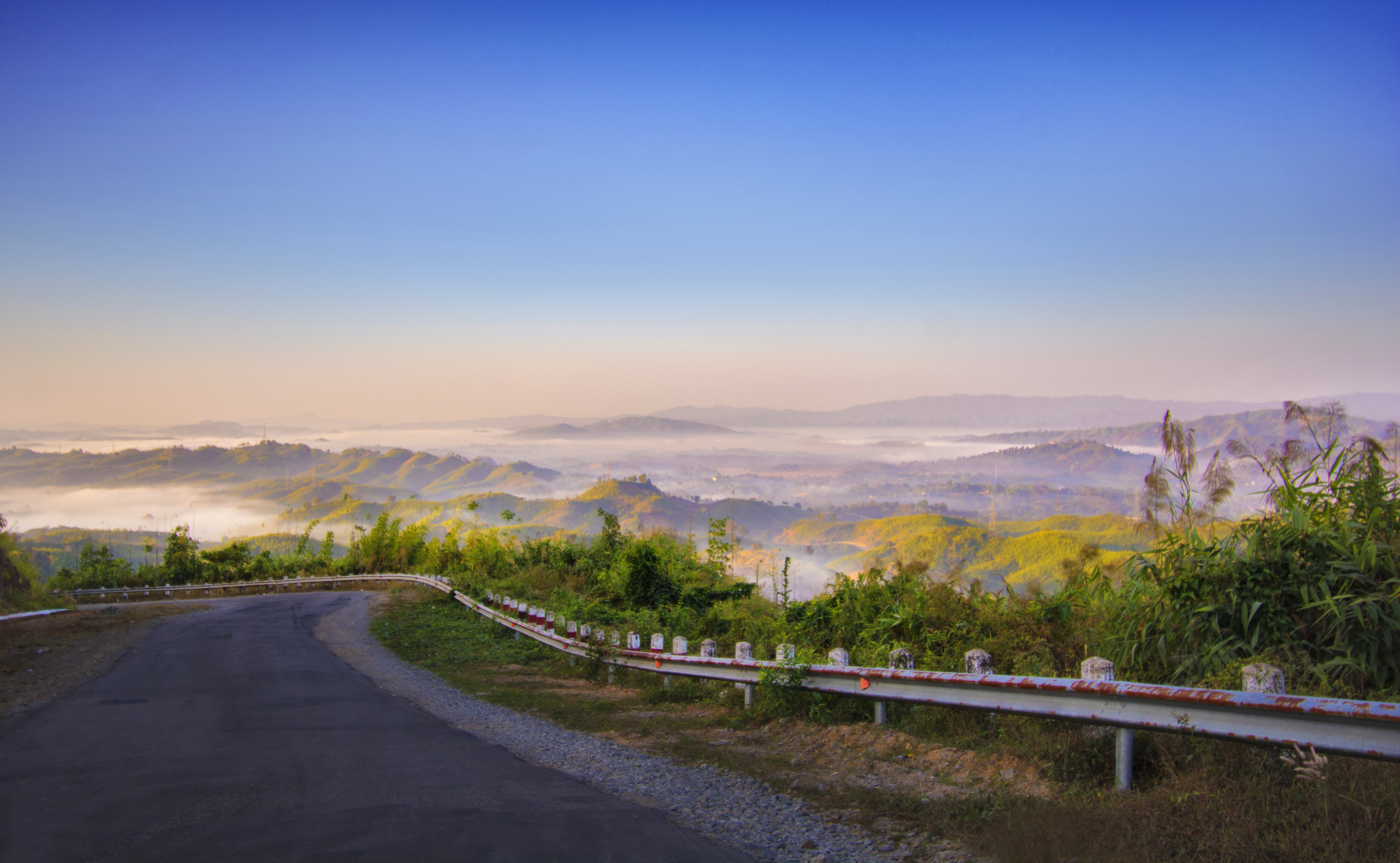
- Ngapali Beach Lawkananda Pagoda, Sittwe Temples in Mrauk U Bya La statue Highway in Ann District

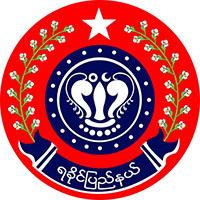
- Flag Seal

- Location of Rakhine State in Myanmar (Burma)
- Coordinates: 19°30′N 94°0′E
- Country: Myanmar
- Region: Lower
- Control: 80–90% under Arakan Army
- Before becoming State: Arakan Division
- renamed as Arakan State: 3 January 1974
- renamed as Rakhine State: 18 June 1989
- Capital: Sittwe

Government
  - Chief Minister: U Naing Oo
  - Cabinet: Rakhine State Government
  - Legislature: Rakhine State Hluttaw
  - Judiciary: Rakhine State High Court

Area
  - Total: 36,778.0 km^{2} (14,200.1 sq mi)
  - Rank: 8th
- Highest elevation (Kema Taung): 1,851 m (6,073 ft)

Population (2014)
  - Total: 3,188,807
  - Rank: 8th
  - Density: 86.7042/km^{2} (224.563/sq mi)

Demographics
  - Ethnicities: Arakanese (Rakhine), Bamars (Burmese), Chin, Kamein, Rohingya, Mro, Khami, That, Daingnet (Chakmas), Maramagyi and others
  - Religions (2024 estimate): 76.7% Buddhism; 21.1% Islam; 1.6% Christianity; 0.4% Hinduism; 0.1% Animism
- Time zone: UTC+06:30 (MMT)
- ISO 3166 code: MM-16
- HDI (2017): 0.520 low · 13th
- Website: rakhinestate.gov.mm

Rakhine State (/rəˈkaɪn/ rə-KYN; Burmese: ရခိုင်ပြည်နယ်, MLCTS: ra.hkuing pranynai, pronounced [jəkʰàiɰ̃ pjìnɛ̀]; Rakhine pronunciation: [ɹəkʰàiɰ̃ pɹènè]), formerly known as Arakan State, is a first-level administrative division in Myanmar (Burma). Situated on the western coast, it is bordered by Chin State to the north, Magway Region, Bago Region and Ayeyarwady Region to the east, the Bay of Bengal to the west and the Chattogram Division of Bangladesh to the northwest. The north–south Arakan Mountains or Rakhine Yoma separate Rakhine State from central Myanmar. Off the coast of Rakhine State there are some fairly large islands such as Ramree, Cheduba and Myingun. Rakhine State has an area of 36,762 square kilometres (14,194 sq mi) and its capital is Sittwe (formerly known as Akyab).

As of November 2025, the Arakan Army, an ethnic armed organization, maintains de facto control over approximately 90 percent of the state, including 14 of its 17 townships.

== Etymology ==
The region is named after the Rakhine people, who form the majority of its population. The state was historically known as Arakan in English until the Burmese government adopted the English name Rakhine in 1989.

The province was officially designated as a state under Myanmar’s administrative system during the 1974 Constitution referendum. Rakhine State Day is celebrated every year on 15 December.

== History ==
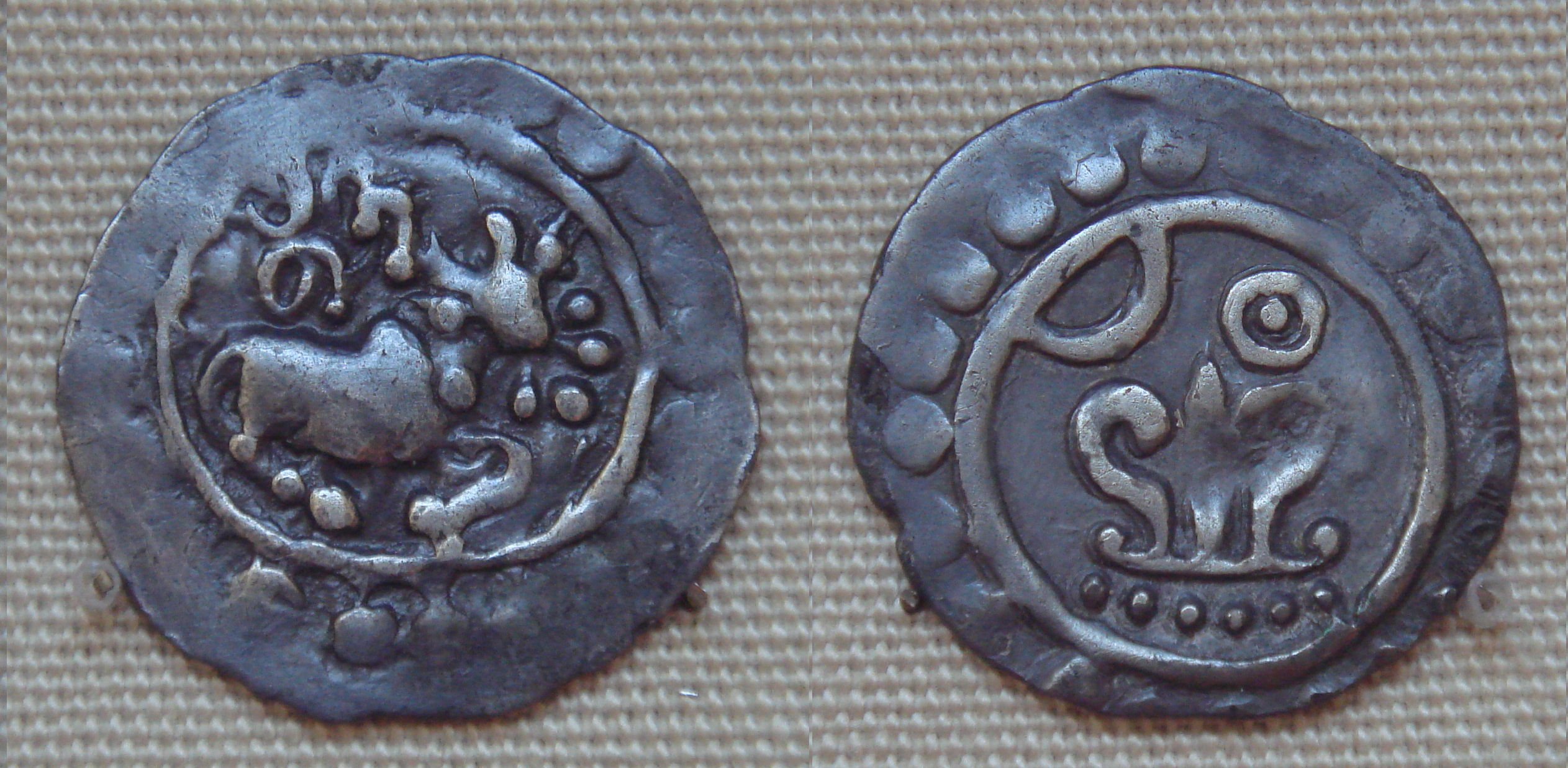
Silver coin of king Nitichandra, Arakan. Brahmi legend "NITI" in front, Shrivatasa symbol on the reverse. 8th century CE.

The history of the region of Arakan (now renamed Rakhine State) can be roughly divided into seven parts. The first four divisions and the periods are based on the location of the centre of power of the main polities in the northern Rakhine region, especially along the Kaladan River. Thus, the history is divided into the Dhanyawadi, Waithali, Laymro and Mrauk U. Mrauk U was conquered by the Konbaung dynasty of Burma in 1784–85, after which Rakhine became part of the Konbaung kingdom of Burma. In 1824, the first Anglo-Burmese war erupted and in 1826, Rakhine (alongside Tanintharyi) was ceded to the British East India Company as war reparations by the Burmese. Rakhine thus became part of the province of Burma in British India. In 1948, Burma was given independence and Rakhine became part of the newly independent state.

=== Independent kingdom ===
Beginning in the 400s, the Pyus and Kanyans of Tibeto-Burman people began migrating westward, crossing the Arakan Mountains and settling in what is now Rakhine State. By the 1100s, they had consolidated control of the region, becoming a tributary state of the Pagan Empire until the 13th century. Over time, these Tibeto-Burmans mixed with Indo-Aryans and formed a distinct cultural identity, eventually becoming the Rakhine people (also known as the Arakanese).

According to Arakanese legend, the first recorded kingdom was founded by the Sakya clan of Buddha who are ancient Hindus Indo-aryans, centred around the northern town of Dhanyawadi, arose in the 34th century BCE and lasted until 327 CE. Rakhine documents and inscriptions state that the famed Mahamuni Buddha image was cast in Dhanyawady in around 554 BCE when the Buddha visited the kingdom. After the fall of Dhanyawadi in the 4th century CE, the centre of power shifted to a new dynasty based in the town of Waithali. The Waithali kingdom ruled the regions of Arakan from the middle of the 4th century to 818 CE. The period is seen as the classical period of Arakan culture, architecture and Buddhism, as the Waithali period left behind more archaeological remains than its predecessor. A new dynasty emerged in four towns along the Lemyo River as Waithali waned in influence, and ushered in the Lemro period, where four principal towns served as successive capitals.

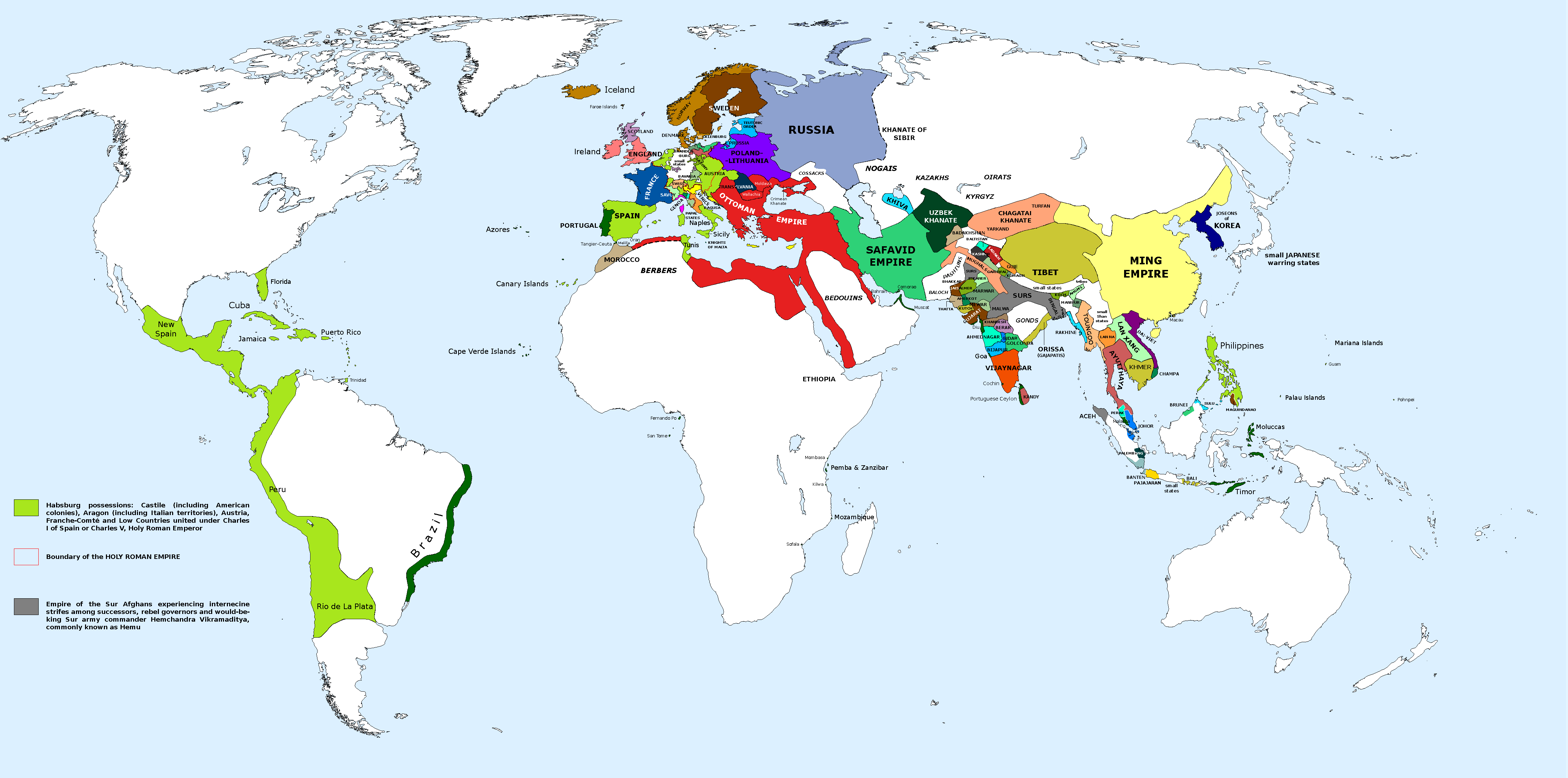
World Map during 1555 CE, Rakhine (Arakan) is seen neighbouring the Toungoo Empire and Bengal

The Kingdom of Mrauk U which was founded in 1429 by Min Saw Mon was the final independent Arakanese kingdom. It is seen by the Rakhine people as the golden age of their history, as Mrauk U served as a commercially important port and base of power in the Bay of Bengal region and involved in extensive maritime trade. The Kingdom of Mrauk-U went on to conquer Chittagong with the help of the Portuguese. The country steadily declined from the 18th century onwards after its loss of Chittagong to the Mughal Empire. Internal instability, rebellion and dethroning of kings were very common. The Portuguese, during the era of their greatness in Asia, gained a temporary establishment in Arakan.

=== Burmese annexation ===
On 2 January 1785, the internally divided kingdom fell to invading forces of the Konbaung dynasty. The Mahamuni Image was taken away by the Burmese Forces as war loot. Thus, an expansionist Burma came into direct territorial contact with territories of the British East India Company, which set the stage for future flaring of hostility. Various geopolitical issues gave rise to the First Anglo-Burmese War (1824–26). As the image of Mahamuni had been taken as war loot by the Burmese, this time the huge bell of the temple was taken by the Presidency armies and awarded to an Indian soldier, Bhim Singh, a Risaldar in the 2nd Battalion of the Bengal Army, for his bravery. This inscribed huge bell is still installed in a temple at village Nadrai near Kasganj town in present-day Kasganj district of Uttar Pradesh India. In the Treaty of Yandabo (1826), which ended hostilities, Burma ceded Arakan alongside Tanintharyi (Tenasserim) to British India. The British made Akyab (now Sittwe) the capital of Arakan. Later, Arakan became part of the province of Burma of the British Indian Empire, and then part of British Burma when Burma was made into a separate crown colony. Arakan was administratively divided into three districts along traditional divisions during the Mrauk U period.

=== British rule ===
Rakhine was the centre of multiple insurgencies which fought against British rule, notably led by the monks U Ottama and U Seinda. During the Second World War, Rakhine was given autonomy under the Japanese occupation of Burma and was even granted its own army known as the Arakan Defense Force. The Arakan Defense Force went over to the allies and turned against the Japanese in early 1945. Rakhine (Arakan) was the site of many battles during the Second World War, most notably the Arakan Campaign 1942–43 and the Battle of Ramree Island.

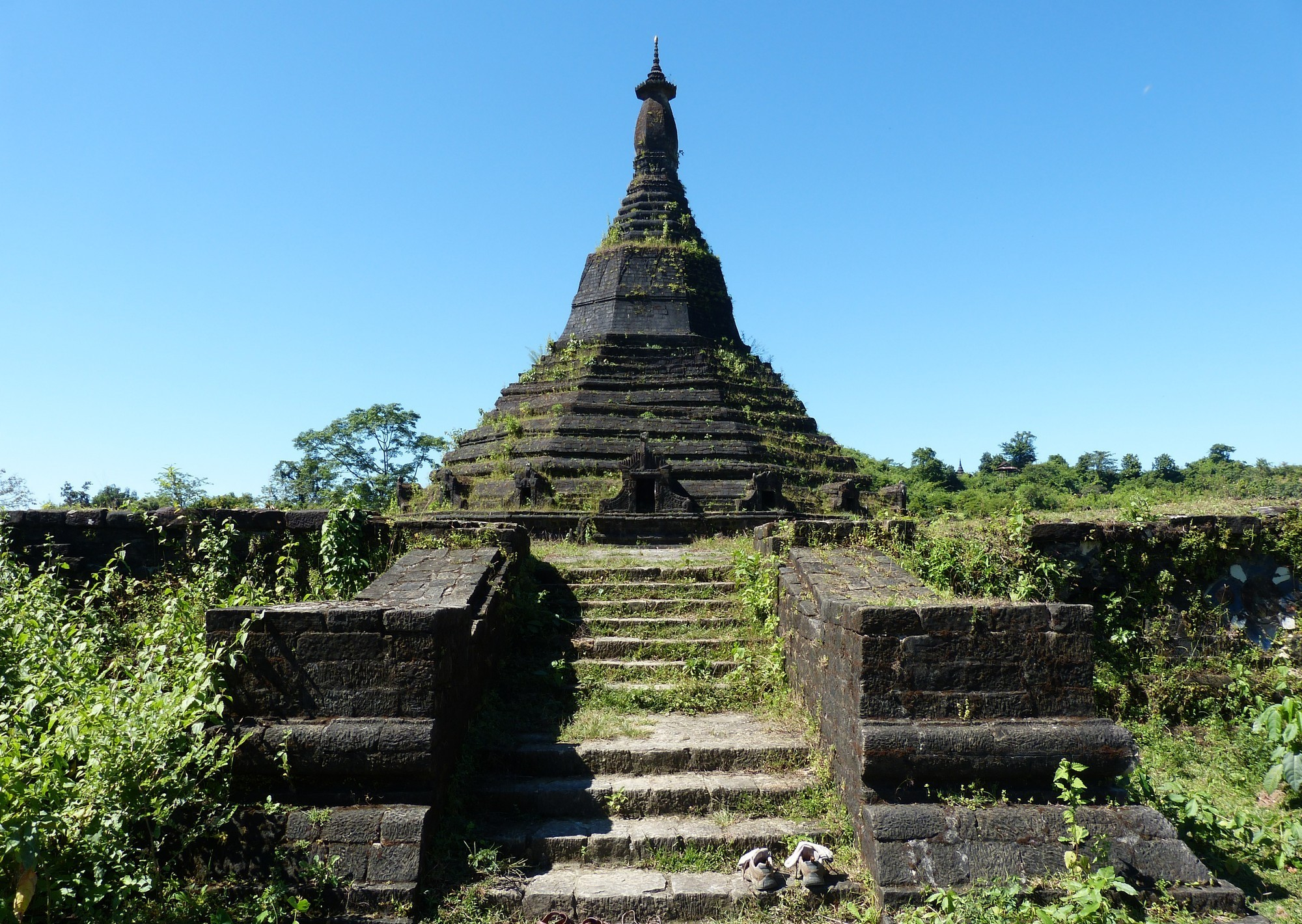
Laung Bwann Brauk Pagoda

=== Burmese independence ===
In 1948, Rakhine became a division within the Union of Burma, and the three districts became Arakan Division. From the 1950s, there was a growing movement for secession and restoration of Arakan independence.

=== 2010 onwards (after 2008 constitution) ===
Since 2010, Rakhine state has had two chief ministers: Hla Maung Tin and Major General Maung Maung Ohn. Hla Maung Tin (January 2011 – 20 June 2014) was an elected Rakhine State Hluttaw member representing USDP from Ann Township in 2010 general election. He resigned from the post after recurrent intense inter-communal conflicts between Muslims and Rakhine ethnic groups in 2012–14. In 2014, he was replaced by Major General Maung Maung Ohn (30 June 2014 – present). Ohn was Deputy Minister for Border Affairs and head of the Rakhine State's Emergency Coordination Center before he was named to become a military-appointed Rakhine State Hluttaw member by Election Commission on 21 June 2014. His appointment as Chief Minister was formalized on 30 June 2014 although Arakan National Party opposed it.

In June 2012, Rakhine State in Myanmar experienced severe communal violence between ethnic Rakhine Buddhists and Rohingya Muslims, resulting in at least 88 fatalities, 4,600 homes being burnt and displacement of approximately 100,000 people.

=== Resurgence of armed conflict (2016–present) ===
As of December 2024, the State Administration Council junta stably possesses only Sittwe Township, Kyaukpyu Township, and Munaung Township. The rest of Rakhine State is either controlled by the Arakan Army, or heavily contested.

=== Political repression by the Myanmar government ===
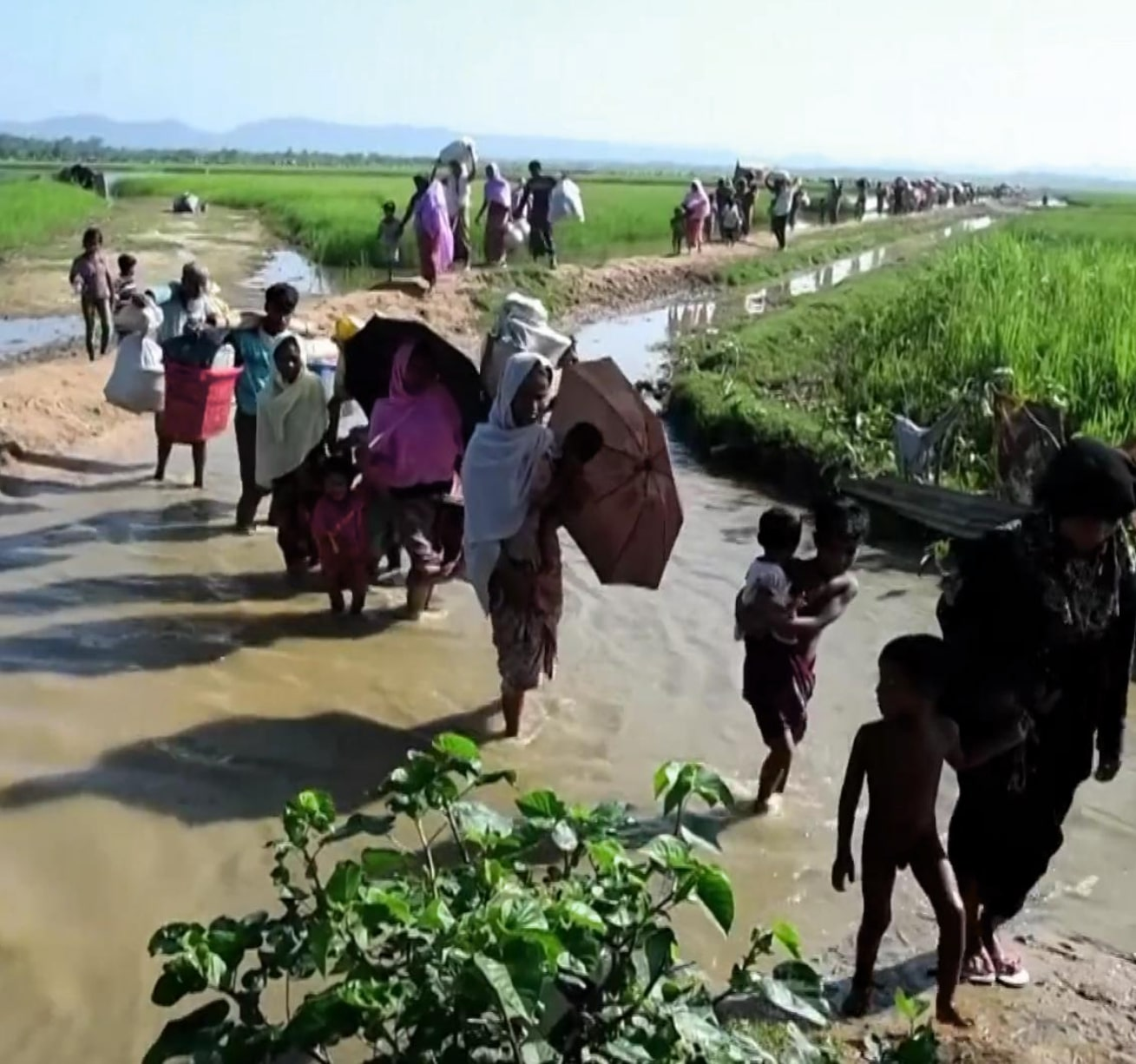
Rohingya refugees entering Bangladesh after being driven out of Rakhine State, 2017

The NLD government refused to share executive power at the state level after the Arakan National Party (ANP) won a majority of votes in Rakhine State during the 2015 general election. Arakanese lawmakers frequently complained that their proposals in the state parliament were rejected or ignored.

In 2017, State Counsellor Aung San Suu Kyi and the Tatmadaw reportedly rejected national-level political dialogue in Rakhine State, a mandatory step under the Nationwide Ceasefire Agreement (NCA). This dialogue would have allowed regional stakeholders to present proposals at large-scale public consultations, with the outcomes discussed at the Union Peace Conference, also known as the 21st Century Panglong. In February 2017, the Arakan Liberation Party (ALP)—one of eight NCA signatories—requested to hold ethnic-based national-level political dialogue in Rakhine State. Aung San Suu Kyi declined, stating that the ALP was not yet ready. Despite submitting three formal requests, the government did not respond. At a Joint Implementation Coordination Meeting (JICM), Suu Kyi again denied the request, citing the sensitive situation involving Rohingya Muslims in Rakhine State.

On 16 January 2018, thousands of residents in Mrauk U staged a protest after officials banned a memorial event commemorating the 233rd anniversary of the fall of the Mrauk U Kingdom. Local police opened fire on the crowd, killing seven people and injuring 12. Two speakers at the event—Aye Maung, a prominent Rakhine politician, and Wai Hun Aung, a Sittwe-based activist—were subsequently charged. Aye Maung was charged under Section 17(1) of the Unlawful Associations Act and Sections 121 and 505 of the Penal Code, relating to high treason and incitement, while Wai Hun Aung was charged with public mischief. Eight Rakhine youths injured in the protest were also detained and charged under Article 6(1) for allegedly damaging government and public property.

On 16 October 2020, the Union Election Commission (UEC) announced that the 2020 Myanmar general election would not be held in several areas of Rakhine State, including the townships of Pauktaw, Ponnagyun, Rathedaung, Buthidaung, Maung Daw, Kyauktaw, Minbya, Myebon, and Mrauk U; along with multiple quarters and village tracts in Kyaukphyu Township, Ann Township, Sittwe Township, and Toungup Township. The UEC stated that free and fair elections could not be held due to ongoing conflict and instability.

With the exception of Toungup Township, ethnic Rakhine parties have historically been dominant in these areas. The Rakhine Nationalities Development Party (RNDP) and Arakan National Party (ANP) won the majority of seats in these townships during the 2010 and 2015 general elections.

=== 2020–present ===
In November 2020, the Myanmar military and the Arakan Army (AA) reached an informal ceasefire, leading to a temporary reduction in hostilities in Rakhine State. However, after the military coup in February 2021, clashes resumed in the region.

Following the military coup in February 2021, Rakhine State experienced intensified armed conflicts, particularly between the Myanmar Armed Forces (MAF) and the Arakan Army (AA). By September 2021, the AA and its political wing, the United League of Arakan (ULA), had gained control over roughly 75% of Rakhine’s townships.

In early 2024, the battle for the border town of Maungdaw resulted in heavy fighting, leading to numerous civilian casualties and displacements. Reports indicate that during this period, civilians, including the Rohingya population, were subjected to coordinated killings, large-scale arson attacks, and shelling. Notably, on August 5, 2024, an attack in Maungdaw targeted Rohingya civilians attempting to flee by boat, resulting in numerous deaths.

On 27 October 2023, Operation 1027 was launched by the Three Brotherhood Alliance, consisting of the Arakan Army (AA), the Ta'ang National Liberation Army (TNLA), and the Myanmar National Democratic Alliance Army (MNDAA). The offensive led to the capture of over 130 military outposts and strategic bases in northern Shan State, including the key border town of Laukkai. Reports indicated significant losses for the Myanmar military, with hundreds of soldiers killed and over 4,000 troops, including senior officers, surrendering.

By February 2025, a CSIS report indicated that the Arakan Army had begun establishing local governments in the Rakhine townships under its control. However, little is known about their governance structure or the inclusion of non-Arakan ethnic groups. It remains unclear whether the AA will halt military operations after securing its claimed territory, as its offensives in Paletwa, Magway, and other areas suggest broader territorial ambitions. The group's stance on Myanmar’s political future is also uncertain, while it previously sought autonomy under the 2008 constitution like the United Wa State Army, it may now pursue full statehood or independence.

On 24 February 2026, Myanmar military aircraft dropped two bombs on a market in Yoe Ngu village, killing 17 and injuring 15. The village is home to approximately 850 internally displaced people (IDPs) with a total population of about 2,500. In July, a second aerial attack occurred about one mile from the village at a camp of IDPs, resulting in one injury. A defected Myanmar military Major told The Diplomat the day after the February airstrikes that attacks on the civilian population would increase in Rakhine’s liberated region, citing the military's mission to defend the three townships of Sittwe, Kyaukphyu, and Manaung that are still under its control. The other 14 townships in the state are effectively governed by the Arakan Army. A United Nations report stated that airstrikes were the leading cause of civilian casualties in Myanmar in 2025, killing at least 982 people, including 232 children.

== Demographics ==
Historical population
Year	Pop.	±%
1973	1,712,838	—
1983	2,045,559	+19.4%
2014	3,188,807	+55.9%
Source: 2014 Myanmar Census

Rakhine State, like many parts of the country, has a diverse ethnic population. Official Burmese figures state Rakhine State's population as 3,118,963.

=== Ethnic makeup ===
Ethnic composition of Rakhine State
Ethnic group	Percentage
Rakhine	69.6%
Rohingya (Note: the official statistics include Rohingya as Bengali foreigners)	25.9%
Chin	3.8%
Bamar	0.4%
Other	0.3%
Source: 2019 GAD township reports

The Rakhine make up the majority of the state's population, followed by a considerable population of Rohingya Muslims that is not officially recognized. Smaller ethnic minorities like the Thet, Kamein, Chin, Mro, Daingnet, Khami, Bengali Hindu and Maramagri inhabit mainly in the hillly regions of the state.

After the 2014 Myanmar census, the Burmese government indefinitely withheld release of detailed ethnicity data, citing concerns around political and social concerns surrounding the issue of ethnicity in Myanmar. In 2022, researchers published an analysis of the General Administration Department's nationwide 2018-2019 township reports to tabulate the ethnic makeup of Rakhine State.

=== Religion ===
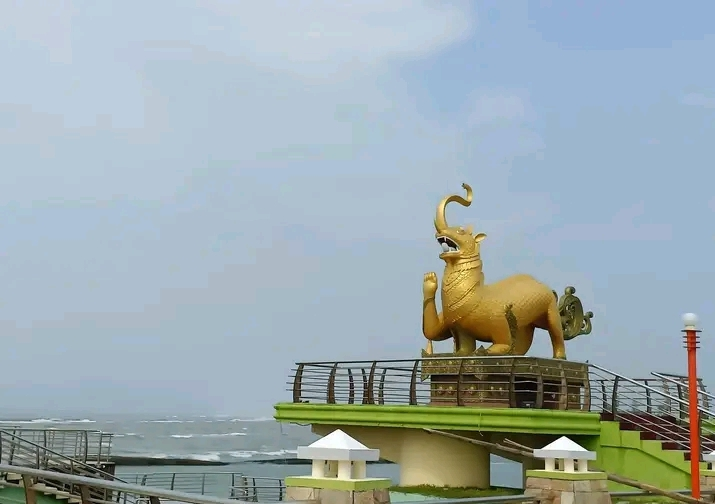
The Bya La statue in Sittwe

According to the State Sangha Maha Nayaka Committee's 2016 statistics, 12,943 Buddhist monks were registered in Rakhine State, comprising 2.4% of Myanmar's total Sangha membership, which includes both novice samanera and fully-ordained bhikkhu. The majority of monks belong to the Thudhamma Nikaya (88.9%), followed by Shwegyin Nikaya (3.9%), with the remainder of monks belonging to other small monastic orders. 534 thilashin were registered in Rakhine State, comprising 0.9% of Myanmar's total thilashin community.

The Rakhine are traditionally Theravada Buddhists. As per the 1983 Census, 98.63% of the Rakhine in Rakhine State were Buddhist and another 1.19% were Muslim who are recognized separately as Kamein. The Chin were the 3rd largest ethnic group, contributing 4% of the population in the 1983 Census. At that time, out of the 64,404 Chin people in Rakhine, 55.76% were Buddhist and 33.79% were Animist. Muslims constituted more than 80–96% of the population near the border with Bangladesh and the coastal areas. As per the 1983 Census, 99.82% of the Rohingya, 99.24% of the "Other foreigners", 89.20% of the "Mixed races", 85.50% of the Indians and 67.51% of the "Pakistanis" in the state were Muslims.

== Administrative divisions ==
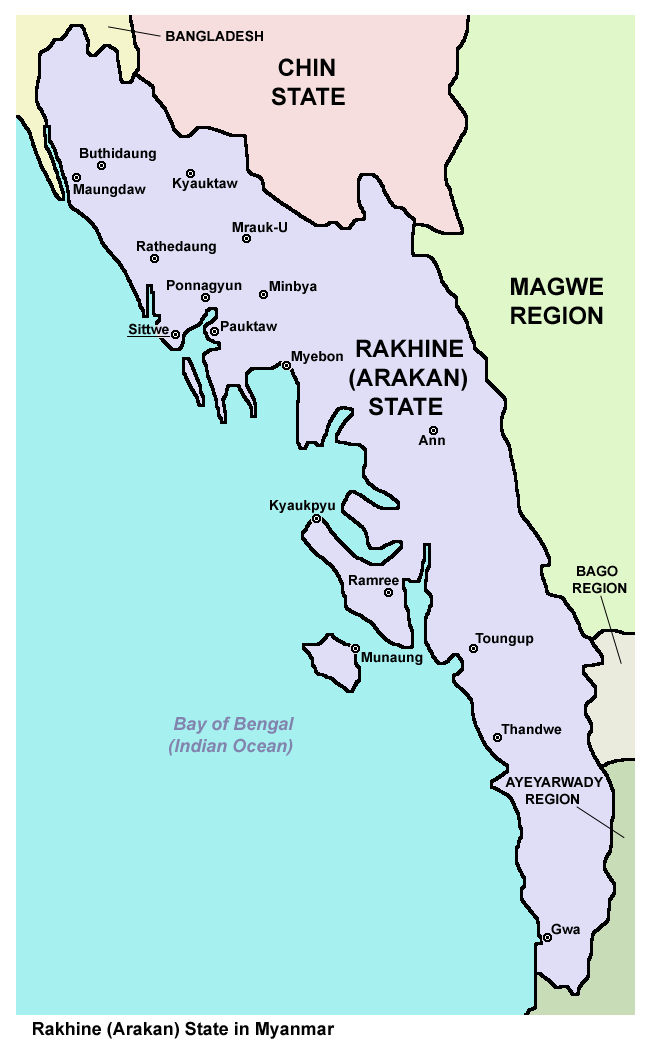
Map of the Rakhine State

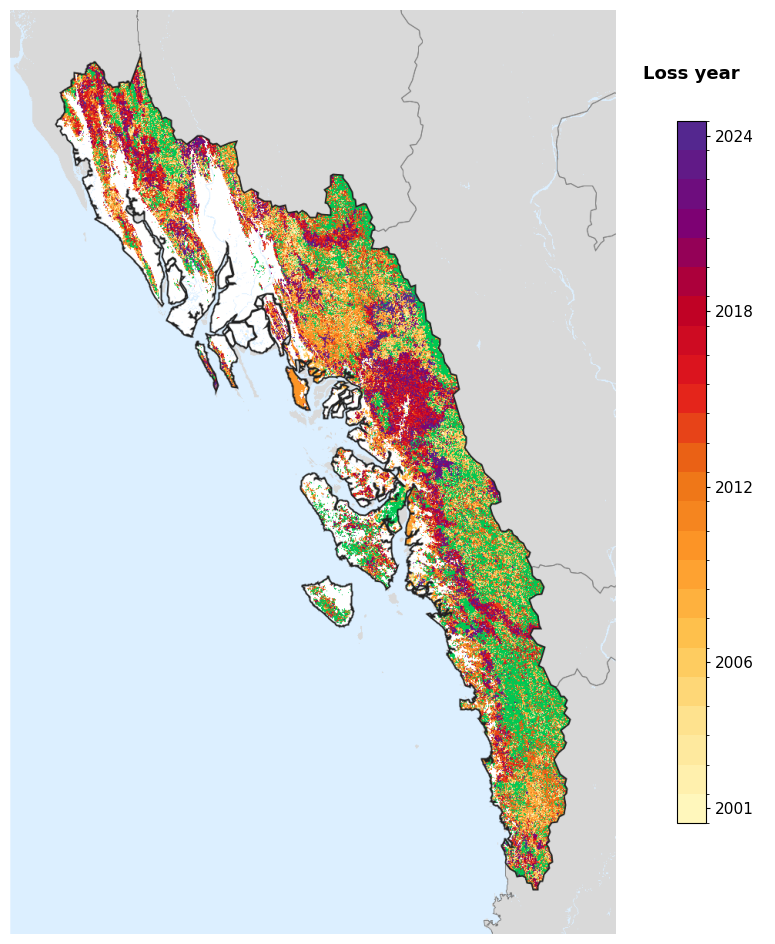
Tree-cover loss year in Rakhine State, 2001-2024, from the Global Forest Change dataset.

Rakhine State consists of seven districts, as below, showing areas and officially estimated populations in 2002:

- Maungdaw (3,538 km^{2}; 763,844 people)
- Sittwe (12,504 km^{2}; 1,099,568 people)
- Mrauk-U (recently created out of Sittwe District)
- Kyaukpyu (9,984 km^{2}; 458,244 people)
- Ann (NA km^{2}; NA people)
- Taungup (NA km^{2}; NA people)
- Thandwe (10,753 km^{2}; 296,736 people)
- Total Rakhine State: 36,778 km^{2}; 2,915,000 people

Combined, these districts have a total of 17 townships and 1,164 village-tracts. Sittwe is the capital city of the state.

== Government ==
=== Executive ===
The Rakhine State Government is the government of Rakhine State and is responsible for the state's administration and governance. Until 2026, the state was governed and administered by the State Administration Council (SAC), following the 2021 Myanmar coup.

=== Legislative ===
The Rakhine State Hluttaw is the legislature of Rakhine State, responsible for local governance, passing state laws, approving localized budgets, and overseeing the state cabinet. The latest election for the Hluttaw was the 2025-2026 general elections, which has been deemed a "sham" by many countries. The Hluttaw has 47 seats and is unicameral.

== Transport ==
Few roads cross the Arakan Mountains from central Burma to Rakhine State. The three highways that do are the Ann to Munbra (Minbya in Burmese pronunciation) road in central Rakhine, the Toungup to Pamtaung road in south central Rakhine, and the Gwa to Ngathaingchaung road in far southern Rakhine. Air travel still is the usual mode of travel from Yangon and Mandalay to Sittwe and Ngapali, the popular beach resort. Only in 1996 was a highway from Sittwe to the mainland constructed. The state still does not have a rail line (although Myanmar Railways has announced a 480-km rail extension to Sittwe from Pathein via Ponnagyun-Kyauttaw-Mrauk U-Minbya-Ann).

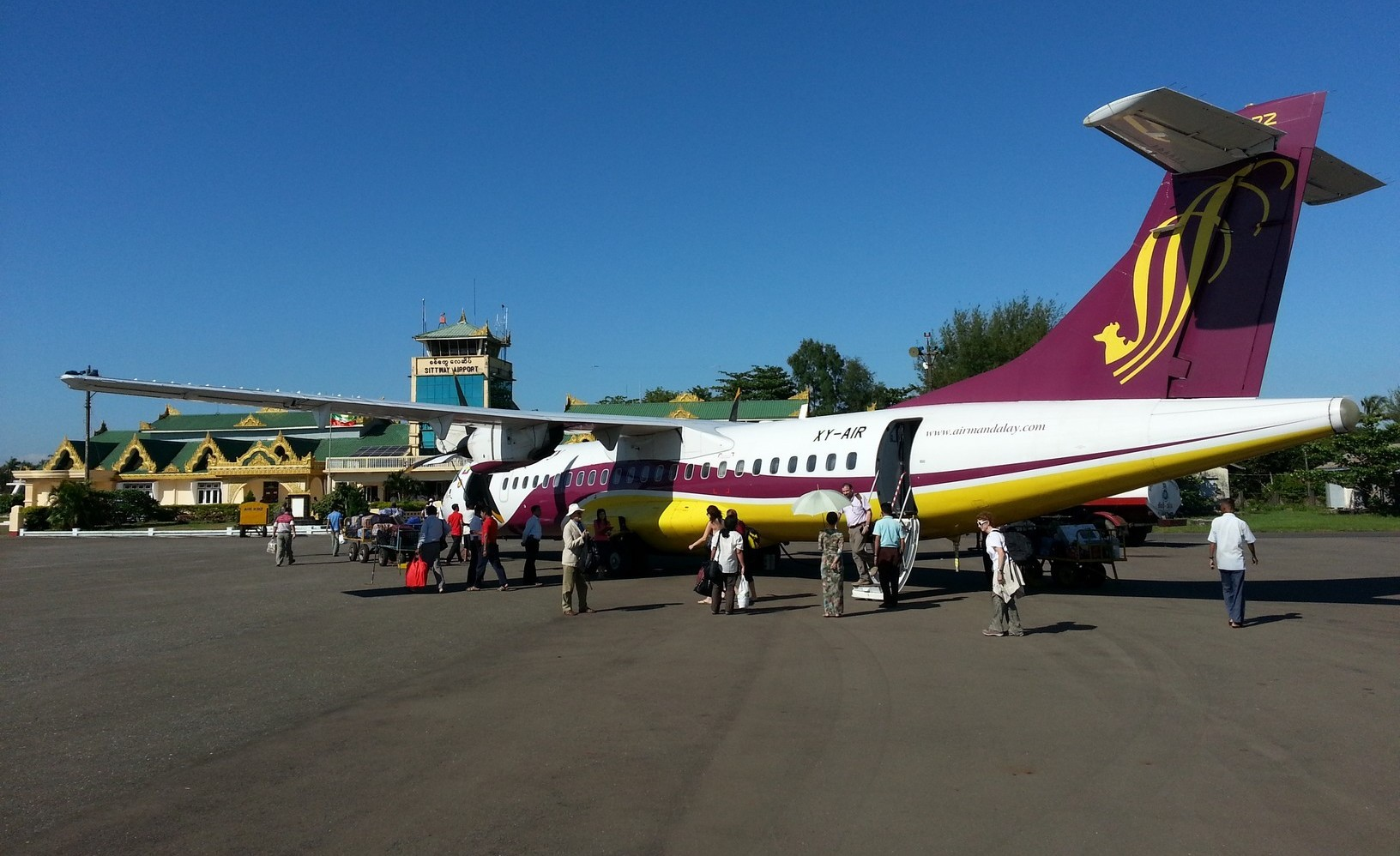
Sittwe Airport

The airports in Rakhine State are

- Sittwe Airport
- Kyaukpyu Airport
- Thandwe Airport
- Ann Airport
- Manaung Airport

With Chinese investment, a deep sea port has been constructed in Kyaukphyu to facilitate the transport of natural gas and crude oil from the Indian Ocean to China without passing through Strait of Malacca.

Rivers useful for transportation in Rakhine are

- Naf River
- Kaladan River
- Lemro River
- Mayu River

== Economy ==
Rakhine is one of the poorest states in Myanmar. Over 69% of the population live in poverty.

Rice is the main crop in the region, occupying around 85% of the total agricultural land. Coconut and nipa palm plantations are also important. Fishing is a major industry, with most of the catch transported to Yangon, but some is also exported. Wood products such as timber, bamboo and fuel wood are extracted from the mountains. Small amounts of inferior-grade crude oil are produced from primitive, shallow, hand-dug wells, but there is yet unexplored potential for petroleum and natural gas production.

Tourism is slowly being developed. The ruins of the ancient royal town Mrauk U and the beach resorts of Ngapali are the major attractions for foreign visitors, but facilities are still primitive, and the transportation infrastructure is still rudimentary.

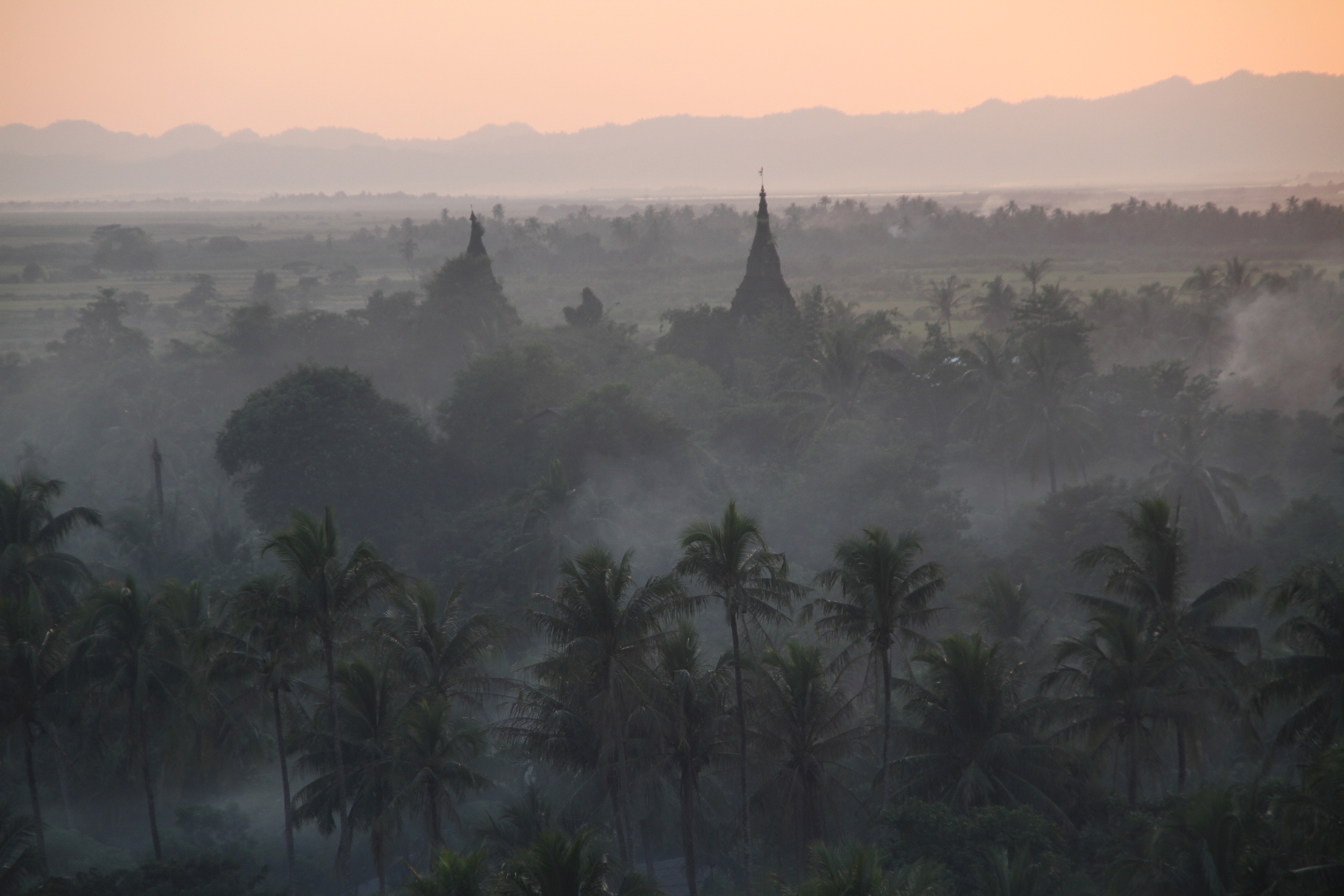
Mrauk U

The region suffers from chronic power shortages. In 2009, the electricity consumption of a state of 3 million people was 30 MW, or 1.8% of the country's total generation capacity. In December 2009, the military government added three more hydropower plants, Saidin, Thahtay Chaung and Laymromyit, at a cost of over US$800 million. The three plants together can produce 687 megawatts, with surplus electricity distributed to other states and divisions.

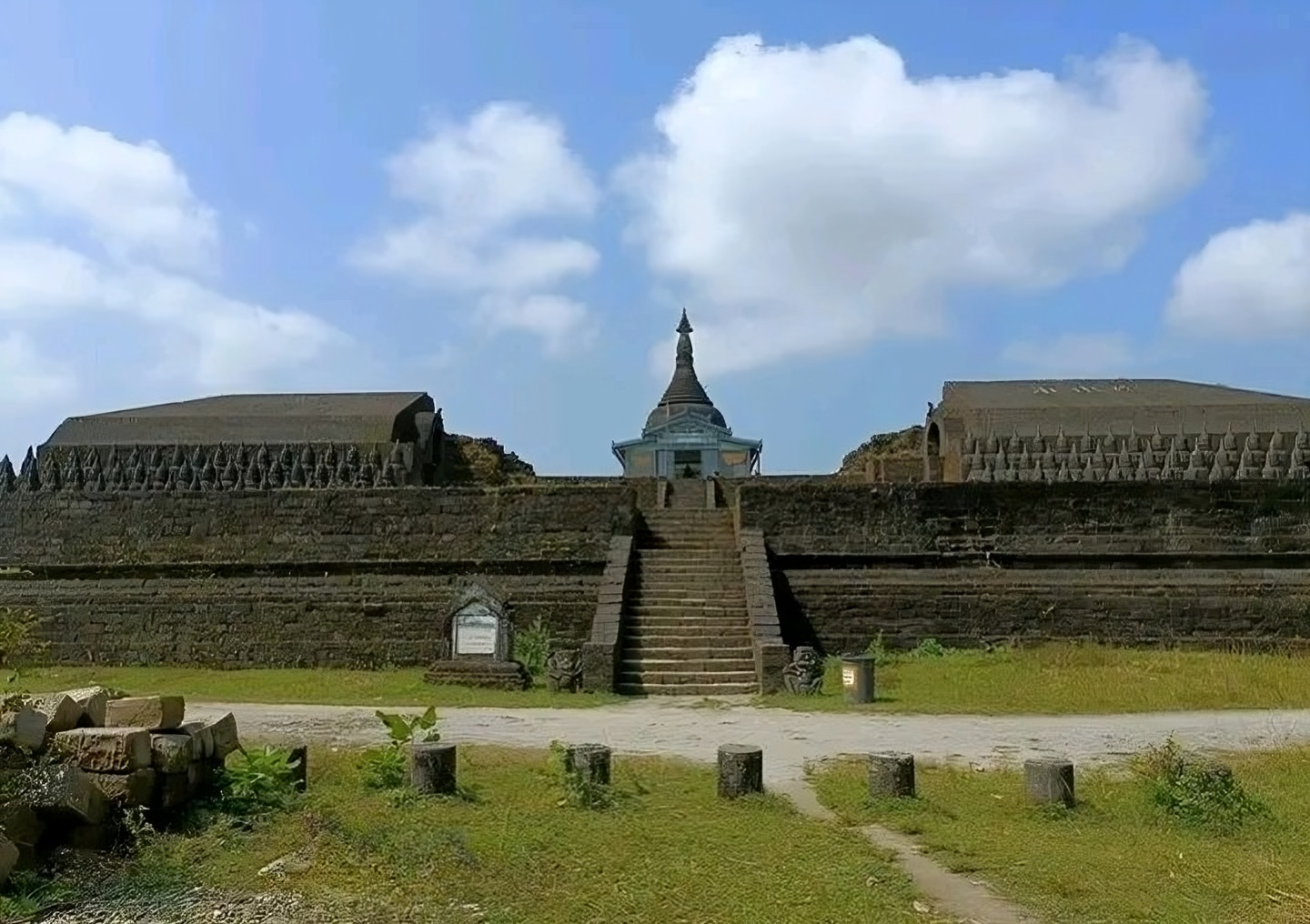
Temple of 90,000 Buddhas in Mrauk U of Rakhine State

Additionally, as of November 2024, reports indicate that over 2 million people in Rakhine State are at risk of famine due to reduced food production and ongoing conflicts. Without urgent action, it is predicted that 95% of the population will regress into survival mode.

== Global interests ==
=== China ===
Rakhine State hosts several major Belt and Road Initiative (BRI) projects, including the Kyaukphyu deep-sea port and oil and gas pipelines. The region serves as an important land and maritime route which allows China access to the Indian Ocean and reducing its dependence on the Strait of Malacca.

Myanmar also acts as a buffer state for China in managing Western and Indian influence in Southeast Asia. Despite international criticism, it is known that China has maintained close relations with Myanmar's military while also engaging with major ethnic armed organizations (EAOs).

=== India ===
India sees Myanmar as an important partner under its "Act East" policy, which aims to improve connectivity and strengthen India's influence in Southeast Asia. The nation has invested in projects such as the Kaladan Multi-Modal Transit Transport Project and the India-Myanmar-Thailand Trilateral Highway.

Route map of the Kaladan Multi-Modal Transit Transport Project

Like China, India also maintains flexible diplomacy by engaging with both Myanmar’s military government and EAOs operating near its borders, including the AA.

=== Others ===
The United States and European countries has stated to support Rakhine state's political aspirations if it aligns with the broader goals of democracy and human rights.

Bangladesh, which shares a border with Rakhine State, has primarily shown concerns about the Rohingya refugee movements. The country hosts over more than one million Rohingya refugees who fled the state.

== Education ==
Educational opportunities in Myanmar are limited outside the main cities of Yangon and Mandalay. The literacy rate in Rakhine State for people aged 15 and above is 84.7%, with 92.2% for males and 78.7% for females. The following is a summary of the public school system in the state in academic year 2013–2014.

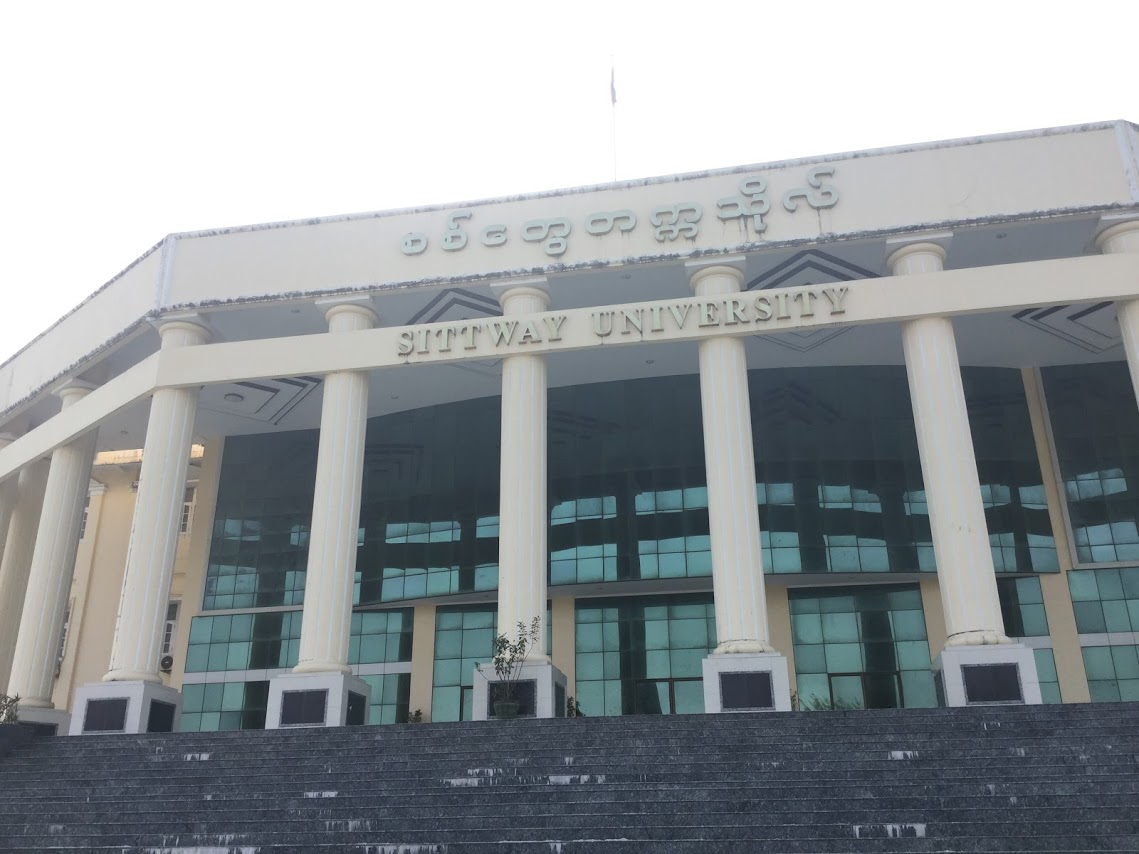
Sittwe University

AY 2013–2014	Primary	Middle	High
Schools	2,515	137	69
Teachers	11,045	2,909	1,337
Students	370,431	100,566	26,671

Sittwe University is the main university in the state. In addition, there are other institutions including Taungup University, Technological University, Computer University, and the Nursing and Midwifery Training School, Kyaukpyu.

The United League of Arakan (ULA) has launched Arakan National University in early 2026 to support the youth education during the civil war.

== Health care ==
The general state of health care in Myanmar is poor. The military government spends anywhere from 0.5% to 3% of the country's GDP on health care, consistently ranking among the lowest in the world. Although health care is nominally free, in reality, patients have to pay for medicine and treatment, even in public clinics and hospitals. Public hospitals lack many of the basic facilities and equipment. The entire Rakhine State has fewer hospital beds than the Yangon General Hospital. The following is a summary of the public health care system in the state.

2002–2003	# Hospitals	# Beds
Specialist hospitals	0	0
General hospitals with specialist services	1	200
General hospitals	16	553
Health clinics	24	384
Total	41	1,137

== See also ==
- List of Arakanese monarchs
- History of Rakhine
- Arakan
- Rakhine State Cultural Museum
