= List of massacres in Myanmar =

The following is an incomplete list of massacres that have occurred in Myanmar (formerly known as Burma).

Name	Date	Location	Deaths	Perpetrators	Victims
1879 massacre at Mandalay Palace	13 - 17 February 1879	Mandalay Palace, Mandalay	40	Hsinbyumashin, U Kaung, Taingda Mingyi and Maung Maung Toke	Princes, princesses and members of royal family
1930 Rangoon riots	1930	Rangoon (present-day Yangon)	120–200+	Bamar rioters	Ethnic Indian dockworkers
Arakan massacres	1942	Arakan (present-day Rakhine State)	20,000 Rakhine Buddhists killed; 40,000+ Rohingya Muslims killed	Rakhine Buddhists and Rohingya Muslims	Rakhine Buddhists and Rohingya Muslims
Kalagong massacre	7 July 1945	Kalagong	600–1,000	(Empire of Japan) Imperial Japanese Army	Villagers of Kalagong
Rangoon bombing	9 October 1983	Rangoon	21	North Korea	South Koreans
8888 Uprising and subsequent massacres	8–9 August 1988	Nationwide	3,000–10,000	Tatmadaw	Pro-democracy protesters
September military coup and massacres	18–19 September 1988	Rangoon	Unknown	Tatmadaw	Burmese civilians and government officials
Depayin massacre	30 May 2003	Depayin	70	Supporters of the SPDC-led military junta	Members of the National League for Democracy (NLD)
Saffron Revolution and massacre of monks	September 2007	Rangoon (near Sule pagoda and Shwedagon pagoda)	13–31	SPDC-led military junta	Buddhist monks
Du Chee Yar Tan massacre	13 January 2014	Du Chee Yar Tan (Killaidaung), Maungdaw Township	50+	Police and Security Forces and Extremist Rakhine Buddhists	Rohingya villagers
Kha Maung Seik massacre	25 August 2017	Kha Maung Seik	99	Arakan Rohingya Salvation Army	Hindu villagers
Chut Pyin massacre	26 August 2017	Chut Pyin	130–358	Myanmar Army and Rakhine villagers	Rohingya villagers
Gu Dar Pyin massacre	27 August 2017	Gu Dar Pyin	10–400+	Myanmar Army and Rakhine villagers	Rohingya villagers
Maung Nu massacre	27 August 2017	Maung Nu	82 killed or missing	Myanmar Army	Rohingya villagers
Tula Toli massacre	30 August 2017	Tula Toli (Min Gyi)	est. 500+	Myanmar Army	Rohingya villagers
Inn Din massacre	2 September 2017	Inn Din	10	Myanmar Army and Rakhine villagers	Rohingya villagers
Hlaingthaya massacre	14 March 2021	Hlaingthaya Township, Yangon	65+	Myanmar Army and Myanmar Police Force	Protesters
Bago massacre	9 April 2021	Bago	82+	Myanmar Army and Myanmar Police Force	Protesters
Mo So massacre	24 December 2021	Mo So	38+	Myanmar Army	Villagers of Mo So
Mon Taing Pin massacre	12 May 2022	Mondaingbin, Sagaing Region	37	Myanmar Army	Villagers
Let Yet Kone massacre	16 September 2022	Let Yet Kone, Tabayin Township	13	Myanmar Army and Myanmar Air Force	Villagers of Let Yet Kon
Hpakant massacre	23 October 2022	A Nang Pa, Hpakant Township	80+	Myanmar Air Force	Kachin civilians, musicians, Kachin Independence Organization officials
Tar Taing massacre	1-2 March 2023	Tartaing, Sagaing Township and Nyaungyin, Myinmu Township	17+	Myanmar Army	Villagers
Pinlaung massacre	11 March 2023	Namneng village, Pinlaung Township	30+	Myanmar Army and Pa-O National Army	Villagers and monks
Pazigyi massacre aka Kanbalu massacre	11 April 2023	Pazigyi, Kanbalu Township	≥165	Myanmar Air Force	Villagers
Laiza artillery strike	9 October 2023	Laiza (China–Myanmar border)	29+	Myanmar Army	Kachin civilians, refugees
Kanan massacre	7 January 2024	Kanan, Sagaing Region	17	Myanmar Air Force	Civilians
Akyi Pan Pa Lun massacre	9 May 2024	Akyi Pan Pa Lun, Magway Region	15+	Myanmar Air Force	Civilians
Lethtoketaw massacre	11 May 2024	Lethtoketaw, Sagaing Region	32	Myanmar Army	Civilians
Byian Phyu massacre	29-31 May 2024	Byian Phyu, Rakhine State	76	Tatmadaw; Rohingya militias Arakan Liberation Army (denied by ALA)	Villagers
Maungdaw Arakan Army's massacre	5 August 2024	Maungdaw, Rakhine State	30	Arakan Army	Rohingya Villagers
Kyauk Ni Maw massacre	8 January 2025	Kyauk Ni Maw, Ramree Island, Rakhine State	40	Tatmadaw	Villagers
Bhamo massacre	7 May 2025	Bhamo, Kachin State	15	Myanmar Air Force	Civilians
Ohe Htein Kwin massacre	12 May 2025	Ohe Htein Kwin, Tabayin Township, Sagaing Region	22	Myanmar Air Force	Teachers and students
Law Kaw Hlo airstrike	17 August 2025	Law Kaw Hlo, Kayah State	24	Myanmar Air Force	Civilians
Pyinnya Pan Khinn High School airstrike	12 September 2025	Thayat Tabin, Kyauktaw Township, Rakhine State	22	Myanmar Air Force	Students
Mrauk-U hospital airstrike	11 December 2025	Mrauk U, Rakhine State	31+	Myanmar Air Force	Civilians
Kyauktaw market airstrike	28 September 2026	Kyauktaw, Rakhine State	50+	Myanmar Air Force	Civilians
