= 2026 Kyauktaw market airstrike =

2026 airstrike in Rakhine State by Myanmar Air Force

2026 Kyauktaw airstrike
- Part of Airstrikes in the Myanmar civil war
- Kyauktaw (Myanmar)
- Location: 20°50′38″N 92°58′03″E; Kyauktaw, Kyauktaw Township, Rakhine State, Myanmar
- Date: 28 September 2026; Around 12:00 MMT
- Target: Market and bridge
- Attack type: Airstrike
- Weapon: Bombs dropped from military aircraft
- Deaths: 50+
- Injuries: 58+
- Perpetrator: Tatmadaw (Myanmar military)

On 28 September 2026, the Myanmar military launched an airstrike on a crowded wholesale market in Kyauktaw, Rakhine State, killing at least 50 people and wounding at least 58 others. The explosions caused massive fires that destroyed local buildings, markets, vehicles, and also significantly damaged a nearby bridge called Kisapanadi Bridge. According to Wai Hun Aung, a senior Rakhine rescue official, the airstrike is noted to be "the most deadliest aerial attack in Rakhine State's history".

== Background ==
The bombs fell at the India Market, as it is locally known, located beneath the Kisapanadi Bridge in Kyauktaw, an area crowded with shoppers, as well as near the bridge. The market is called “India Market” because it sells goods imported from India. Besides local residents of Kyauktaw, displaced people from towns such as Buthidaung, Maungdaw, Sittwe, and Pauktaw also sell goods there. It had more than 200 shops and was crowded with shoppers coming from across Rakhine State. The population included Rakhine people, and various minority ethnic groups including Daingnet people, Rohingya people, and Kamein people.

The Arakan Army controls most of Rakhine, including the area of Kyauktaw. The Myanmar's military has used Russian and Chinese supplied fighter jets in operations against rebel groups in the civil war and has repeatedly been accused of attacking civilian targets, including schools, monasteries and religious gatherings.

== Attack ==
The airstrike took place at around 5:30 GMT (between 12:10 and 12:14 MMT Local time) on Wednesday, September 28 2026, in Kyauktaw Township. The Myanmar Air Force carried out the attack using a fighter jet, which dropped at least two bombs on the area. The Arakan Army said that the bombs were around 500-pound and were dropped by a fighter jet on the bridge in Kyauktaw town and on the Indian market located about 500 yards from the bridge. The attack directly killed merchants inside the market as well as local residents and passersby. The market has been a major trading center, primarily dealing in dry goods such as beans, dried fish, and chili, as well as fuel. Wai Hun Aung stated to Radio Free Asia that a lot of people from nearby villages came there to buy and sell things, and the bombs were dropped around noon in that area. One bomb hit the bridge and fell underneath, while the other hit the market directly. After the bombings, the fire was extremely high leading to people getting caught in the flames.

== Casualties and damage ==
Shortly after the attack, the Arakan Army initially reported that at least 33 civilians had been killed and 36 wounded, noting that the death toll could rise. After more information, the reported death toll increased to 49-50, while the number of injured rose to 58. Among the 58 injured, 22 were wounded with sustained serious injuries. The injured included 32 women and 26 men.

Multiple locals including shoppers, vendors, tourists and other civilians were present at the scene at the time of the attack. Many of those killed included children, pregnant women, and elderly people.

== Aftermath ==
On the same day, the Myanmar regime carried out similar airstrikes in Minbya Township and at Ngapali Beach in Thandwe Township, resulting in nine civilians injured.

Shortly after, 22 unidentified bodies were buried together by the United League of Arakan as the corpses were severely burned that they were completely unrecognizable, making identification by family members or rescue workers impossible.

=== Reactions ===
The United League of Arakan (ULA) has accused the Myanmar government military of deliberately carrying out airstrikes on civilian areas where there was no active fighting, strongly condemning the airstrike attacks. The ULA also referred to previous airstrikes in Rakhine State, accusing the military of continuing to target civilian areas far from the front lines. U Khaing Thu Kha, Arakan Army spokesperson, said it will retaliate against the military and each person involved in the massacre.

UN officials including, Volker Türk, Antonio Guterres, Stephane Dujarric, the European Union, the UK government, and the ASEAN Parliamentarians for Human Rights (APHR) has issued similar statements strongly condemning the airstrike noting that the military regime has been unable to gain control of the ground and has relied heavily on airstrikes on densely populated areas leading to deaths of local people which is crimes against humanity.

== See also ==
- List of massacres in Myanmar
  - 2025 Mrauk-U hospital airstrike
  - 2025 Depayin School bombing
  - Thayet Thapin airstrike
  - Byian Phyu massacre
- War crimes in the Myanmar civil war (2021–present)
