= Rohingya massacres =

Rohingya massacres may refer to:

- Rohingya genocide
- Chut Pyin massacre, massacre of Rohingya people by the Myanmar Army and armed locals on 26 August 2017
- Gu Dar Pyin massacre, massacre of Rohingya people by the Myanmar Army and armed locals on 27 August 2017
- Inn Din massacre, massacre of Rohingya people by the Myanmar Army and armed locals on 30 August 2017
- Maung Nu massacre, massacre of Rohingya people by the Myanmar Army on 27 August 2017
- Tula Toli massacre, massacre of Rohingya people by the Myanmar Army on 2 September 2017

Rohingya massacres may also refer to:

- Arakan massacres in 1942
