= 2025 Mrauk-U hospital airstrike =

Killing of civilians by Myanmar Air Force

Mrauk U hospital airstrike
- Part of Airstrikes in the Myanmar civil war
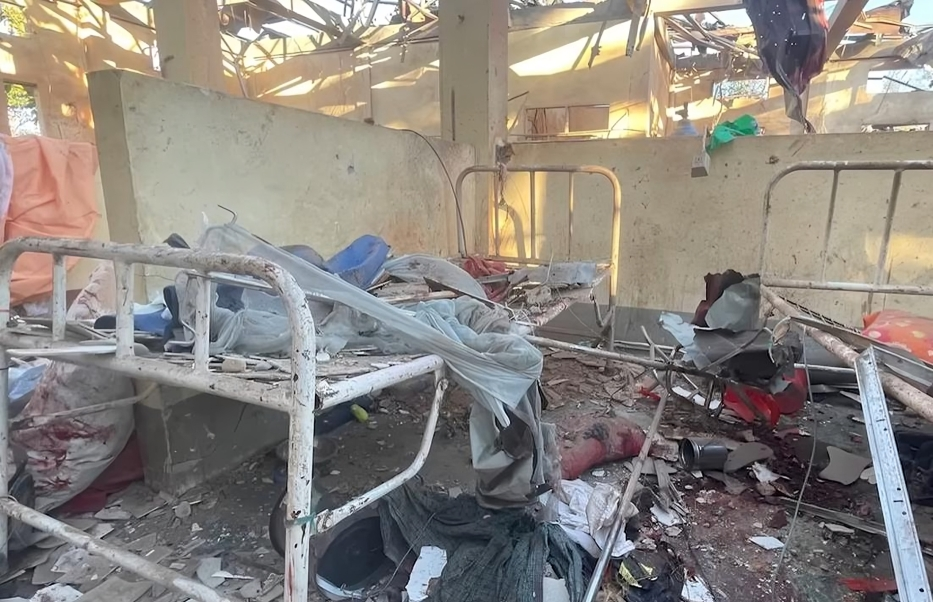
- Ruins of hospital in morning after the airstrike

- Mrauk U (Myanmar)
- Location: 20°36′29″N 93°10′34″E; Mrauk U, Mrauk-U Township, Rakhine State, Myanmar
- Date: 10 December 2025; At 21:13 MMT
- Target: Hospital
- Attack type: Airstrike
- Weapon: Bombs dropped from military aircraft
- Deaths: 33-34
- Injuries: 70-80+
- Perpetrator: Tatmadaw (Myanmar military)

On the night of 10 December 2025, a Myanmar military airstrike struck the general hospital in Mrauk‑U Township, located in western Rakhine State, Myanmar. The attack killed approximately more than 33 people and injured more than 70–80, including patients, caregivers, and hospital staff. The bombing caused severe destruction to the facility, leaving wards, operating theaters, and left nearby residential areas damaged. According to witnesses, aid workers, and the local group Arakan Army (AA), the strike was carried out by the military junta. The attack occurred amid the preceding Myanmar's planned national elections on 28 December 2025 and coincided with International Human Rights Day which drew attention for targeting a civilian medical facility.

== Background ==
The hospital is one of Mrauk-U’s most popular as it was known for being well-equipped. In February 2024, the town was captured by the Arakan Army, an armed group composed mainly of ethnic Rakhine who are the majority in the state.

In recognition of Human Rights Day, just hours ahead of the bombing, the EU, UK, Canada, Norway, and Australia issued statements denouncing Myanmar's human rights violations.

== Attack ==
The airstrike took place on Wednesday, 10 December 2025, at approximately 9:13 pm local time (21:13) in Mrauk‑U Township. Myanmar military's air force carried out the attack using a jet fighter, which dropped at least two bombs on the hospital compound. One bomb hit the recovery and ward area, while the other struck near the main hospital building. According to the Arakan Army health department, 10 patients were directly killed at the point. The bombs were approximately 500 pounds (226 kg) each.

The main target of the bombing was the Mrauk U General Hospital which was capable of potentially 300 patients. Large parts of the hospital were completely destroyed, including the main hall, operating theatre, and wards. Surrounding infrastructure, homes, and vehicles also suffered significant blast and shrapnel damage.

== Casualties and damage ==
According to the Arakan Army spokesperson Khaing Thu Kha, more than 33 individuals were reported dead, including both patients and caregivers, with 70–80 people being injured. Among the 33 individuals who passed away, 17 were males and 16 were females. Among the 27 individuals who were injured, 18 were males and 7 were females. Furthermore, 49 individuals experienced slight injuries. Those affected included hospital staff, support workers, patients, and family members. The hospital was a civilian medical facility, and the attack struck directly inside the building, not just nearby, which contributed to the high death toll. According to local sources, at least 3 local Muslims were also reportedly killed.

Hospital infrastructures including wards, recovery areas, and staff housing was either destroyed or severely compromised leaving the facility in ruins. Residents later discovered bodies and wounded people shortly after hearing loud explosions.

== Aftermath and reactions ==
The remaining patients were relocated to a secure location shortly after the strike.

The attack drew condemnations and statements of condolences from several international actors, including the European Union, Doctors Without Borders (MSF), the National Unity Government of Myanmar, UN officials like Volker Türk, WHO Director-General Tedros Adhanom Ghebreyesus, ASEAN, and Bangladesh's Foreign Ministry. All issued similar statements terming the attack as a war crime which violated international law, expressed support for the victims and their families, and demanded a full investigation.

=== Continued strikes ===
The day after the bombing of Mrauk-U Hospital, the military junta further bombed Ngalunzu village cluster in Kyaukphyu Township with a jet fighter killing eight civilians and injuring ten.

Later, the military junta issued a statement claiming the bombing targeted only armed groups' camps disguised as a hospital.

== See also ==
- List of massacres in Myanmar
  - 2026 Kyauktaw market airstrike
  - 2025 Depayin School bombing
  - Thayet Thapin airstrike
  - Byian Phyu massacre
- War crimes in the Myanmar civil war (2021–present)
