= Let Yet Kone massacre =

2022 massacre in Sagaing Region, Myanmar

Coordinates: 22°40′36″N 95°24′09″E

- Part of the 2021 Myanmar coup d'état and the Myanmar civil war (2021–present)
- Site of massacre (Myanmar)
- Location: Let Yet Kone, Sagaing Region
- Date: 16 September 2022
- Deaths: at least 13 (including 7 children)
- Perpetrators: State Administration Council; Myanmar Army; Myanmar Air Force
- Charges: None

The Let Yet Kone massacre was a mass killing of civilians on 16 September 2022, at a monastic school in the village of Let Yet Kone, near Tabayin in Sagaing Region, in north-western Myanmar. During the massacre, Myanmar Army and Myanmar Air Force troops killed at least 13 civilians, including 8 children. The event became one of Myanmar's deadliest civilian massacres involving children in 2022, during which 165 children were killed by military forces.

== Background ==
On 1 February 2021, the Myanmar Armed Forces staged a coup d'état and deposed the democratically elected government led by the National League for Democracy. Shortly thereafter, the military established a junta, the State Administration Council (SAC), and declared a national state of emergency. In response, civilians throughout the country staged large-scale protests to resist the military takeover.

By May 2021, the resistance had escalated into a civil war against the SAC, which was unwilling to compromise. Let Yet Kone (also spelt Letyetkon) is situated in the traditional Bamar Buddhist heartland, which quickly emerged as a stronghold of resistance against military rule. Given the fierce resistance, by November 2021, the Burmese military had begun launching airstrikes in Sagaing to regain control, forcing thousands of villagers to flee. Sagaing Region was previously the site of several other recent massacres, including the Mon Taing Pin massacre in May 2022, which killed 37 villagers.

== Incident ==
On the afternoon of 16 September 2022, class was in session at a monastic school near Maha Dhammayanthi Monastery in Let Yet Kone. The school teaches 250 students from kindergarten to the eighth grade, and serves Let Yet Kone and nearby villages.

Around 1 pm, two Russian-made Mi-35 helicopters launched an airstrike at the school, while Mi-17 helicopters led a ground attack. The helicopters shelled the school grounds for 45 minutes, firing rockets and machine guns as students scattered to hide, before ground forces launched an infantry attack. Several bodies were torn apart by the crossfire, while others died from excessive bleeding. Ground troops then entered the campus, to gather the students and schoolteachers. Throughout the afternoon, troops removed evidence of the attack, including victims' corpses. Troops also detained two teachers and 20 students, all seriously injured, along with 6 villagers as hostage. Russian-made S-5 rockets were later found at the massacre site.

== Perpetrators ==
The attack was carried out by Myanmar Air Force and Myanmar Army troops, including members of the 368th Light Infantry Battalion (LIB) under the command of the 10th Military Operations Command (MOC-10), which reports to Brigadier-General Thant Zin Oo. Both armed forces branches are under the command of Min Aung Hlaing, who also heads the military junta, the State Administration Council.

== Victims ==
At the time of their deaths, the 12 known victims ranged from the ages of 7 to 49, including 6 schoolchildren. One victim remained unidentified.

1. Phone Tayza – aged 7
2. Su Yati Hlaing – aged 7
3. Zin Nwe Phyo – aged 9
4. Win Win Khaing – aged 11
5. Saw Min Oo – aged 13
6. Pho Thar (aka Zin Ko Oo) – aged 14
7. Aung Aung Oo – aged 16
8. Aung Chit Moe – aged 22
9. Tin Soe Khaing – aged 31
10. Aung Saw Htwe – aged 34
11. Yu – aged 37
12. Kyaw Htun – aged 49

== Aftermath ==
In the immediate aftermath of the attack, 50,000 nearby villagers living on the western bank of the Mu River fled their homes. Army troops had secretly cremated victims' corpses at Ye-U cemetery, which is located 11 kilometres (6.8 mi) from the village. Villagers later uncovered the abandoned corpses of several victims, including that of a 13-year-old boy. The junta forced two surviving schoolchildren to read scripted testimonies claiming that the village was occupied by People's Defence Force troops, as a condition of their release from military custody.

The Burmese military has escalated its campaign against locals in the Bamar heartland, for supporting the anti-coup resistance movement. On 30 November, it began a new campaign, committing arson and raiding over 2,000 homes in 19 villages in Depayin Township, where Let Yet Kone is located. During the campaign, 200 homes in Let Yet Kone were torched by army troops. Between the February 2021 coup and January 2023, military forces had burned down over 5,000 houses throughout the township.

== Reactions ==
=== Domestic ===
On 20 September, Myanmar's military regime denied carrying out the aerial strike. State-run New Light of Myanmar claimed that security forces had inspected the village, after receiving a tip that resistance forces had been hiding there. The military junta's spokesperson, Zaw Min Tun, later claimed the attack was intended to target Kachin Independence Army and People's Defence Force soldiers, and alleged that resistance forces had used the schoolchildren as 'human shields.'

The opposition National Unity Government of Myanmar (NUG) issued a statement strongly condemning the targeted attack, calling the massacre a war crime. The NUG has called for a total ban on the sale of jet fuel to Myanmar. In November 2021, an Amnesty International investigation found that Myanmar's armed forces have diverted civilian jet fuel to the Air Force for military use.

=== International ===
The massacre was not picked up by international organisations until the following week. On 19 September, UNICEF condemned the incident, and the following day Save the Children followed suit. On 20 September, the spokesperson of António Guterres, the Secretary-General of the United Nations, condemned the attack. On 27 September, the UN's Independent Investigative Mechanism for Myanmar announced it was gathering evidence to assess criminal responsibility. Under international law, armed attacks that target civilians are considered war crimes or crimes against humanity. Guterres reiterated that attacks on schools violate humanitarian law, and constitute one of six grave violations against children.

In February 2023, the Canadian and British governments imposed new measures on the supply and sale of aviation fuel to Myanmar.

== See also ==
- 2021 Myanmar coup d'état
- Myanmar civil war (2021–present)
- List of massacres in Myanmar
