= Tabayin massacre =

2021 massacre in Myanmar

Coordinates: 22°39′27″N 95°13′48″E

- Part of the 2021 Myanmar coup d'état and subsequent protests
- Site of massacre (Myanmar)
- Location: Boke Ywar and Satpyarkyin,Tabayin Township
- Date: 2 July 2021
- Deaths: 41
- Perpetrators: Myanmar Army; Myanmar Police Force
- Defender: Local People's Defense Force
- Charges: None

On 2 July 2021, the Myanmar Army (Tatmadaw) conducted armed raids throughout villages in Tabayin Township, Sagaing Region. The massacre resulted in the deaths of 40 people, including six children and five university students.

== Details ==
On 2 July 2021, a local People's Defence Force (PDF) unit merely armed with homemade firearms immediately opened fire on multiple Myanmar Army companies attacking the villages. Although the military suffered at least 15 casualties, artillery shells and RPGs forced the PDF unit to retreat after firing for 20 minutes. During this time, the soldiers initiated a "shoot anything that moves" approach, resulting in the deaths of at least 40 people, including six schoolchildren and five university students. The soldiers then looted many houses in the area.

== See also ==
- Depayin massacre
