= Airstrikes in the Myanmar civil war (2021–present) =

Airstrikes by Myanmar military
- Part of Myanmar civil war (2021–present)
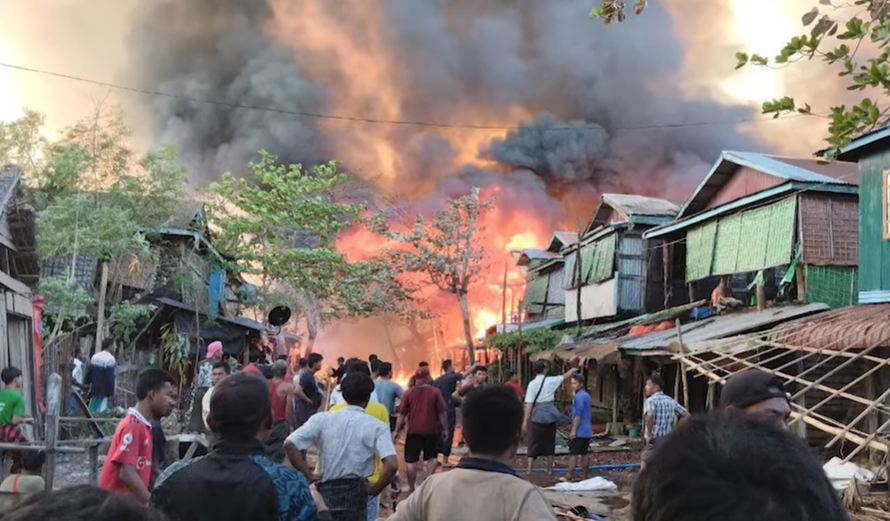
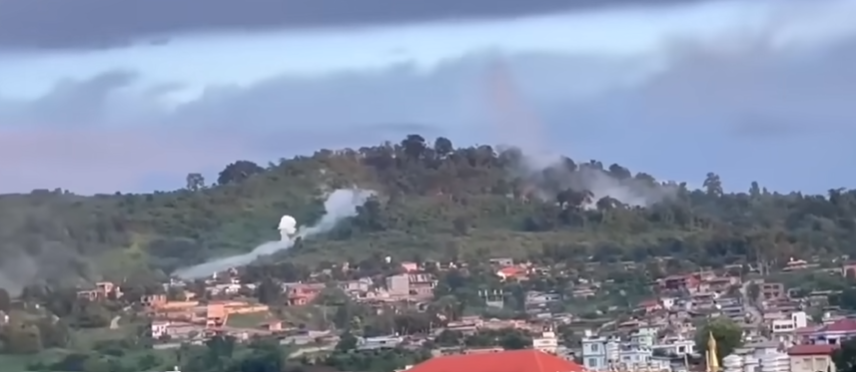
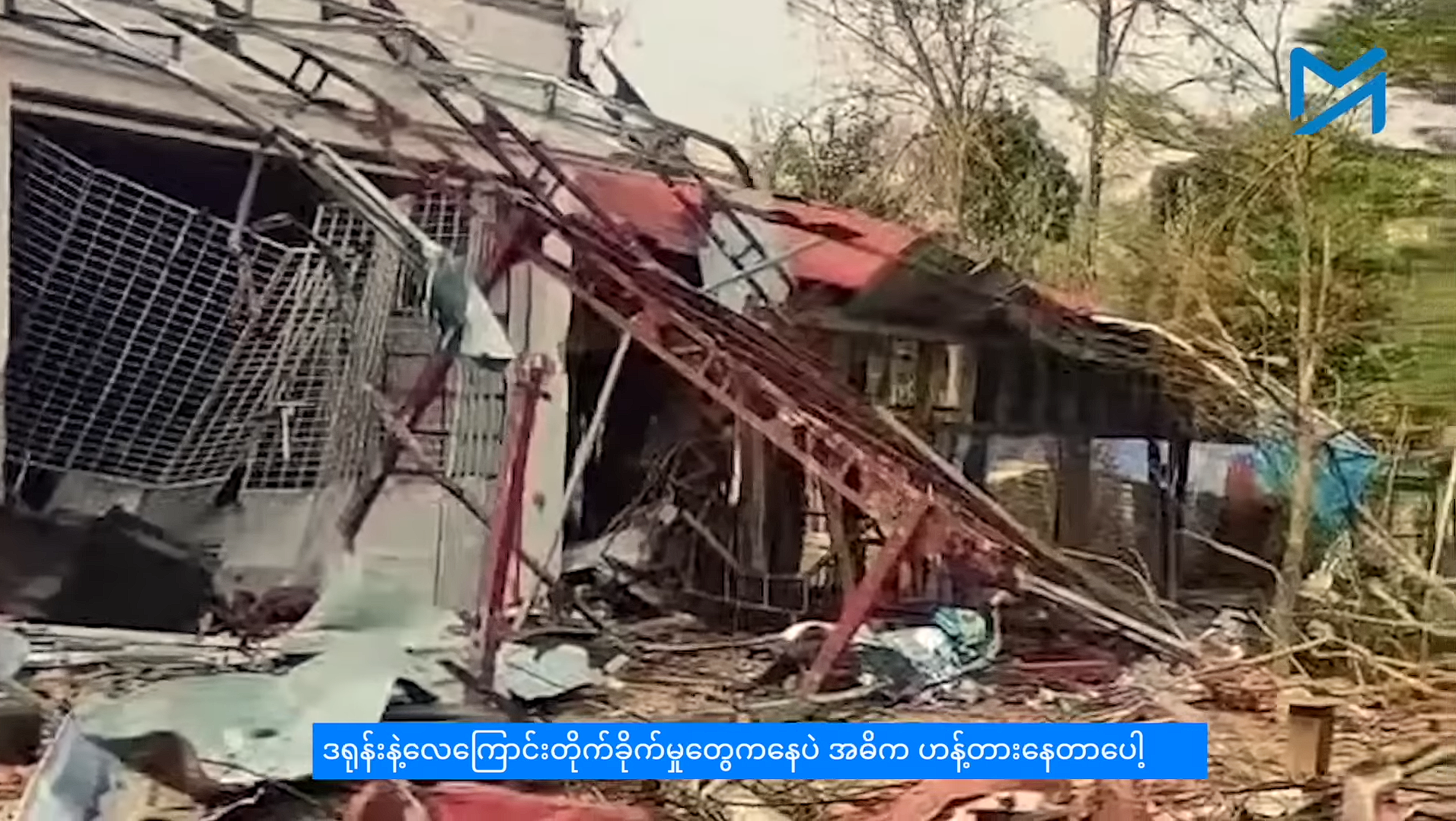
- MAF bombing of Kyauktaw; Military bombing of Lashio, Shan State; House damaged due to bombing in Bhamo
- Location: Across Myanmar (significantly in Sagaing Region, Rakhine state, Chin State and parts of Shan State)
- Date: 25 March 2021 – present (5 years, 7 months and 6 days)
- Attack type: Bombardment
- Deaths: 4000+ (Note: See Casualties)
- Injuries: 10,000+
- Perpetrators: Myanmar: Myanmar Army; Myanmar Air Force

The Myanmar Air Force has conducted numerous concerted aerial bombings on different states of Myanmar during the Myanmar Civil War which started since 2021.

== Background ==
The Myanmar civil war began after the military coup on February 1, 2021, when the Tatmadaw seized power from the elected government, sparking nationwide protests and armed resistance. Since then, ethnic armed groups have been occupying territories in the country. Unable to resist, the Myanmar junta has conducted airstrikes, causing widespread damage and casualties.

== Attacks ==
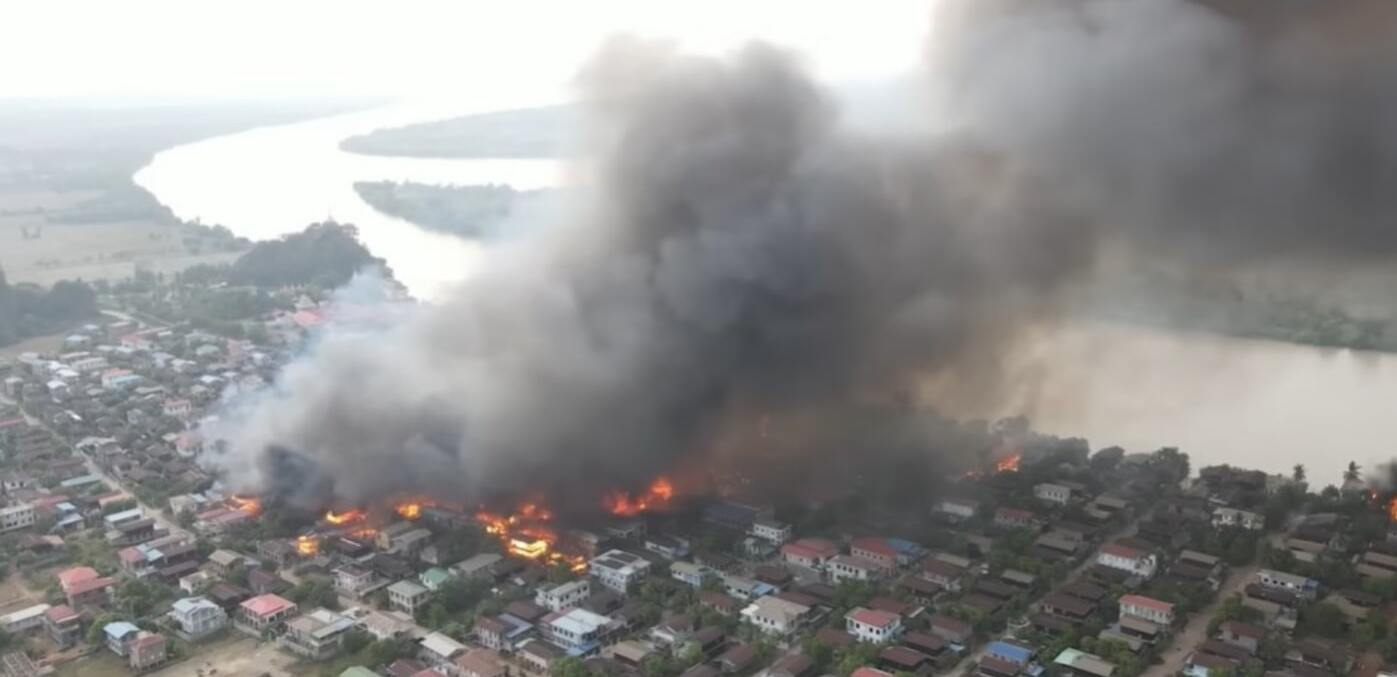
Mon State Kyomaro Township bombed by SAC's air attack on Dhammatha village

=== Schools ===
The military junta has intensified its aerial campaign against schools which have killed dozens of students and teachers across Rakhine, Sagaing, and Chin states. Between May and October 2025, bombings on schools in several townships have resulted in the deaths of more than 75 children and teachers, with hundreds more injured.

=== Religious sites ===
According to multiple reports, the junta's forces have held air-strikes, bombed and destroyed hundreds of religious sites, including Buddhist temples, Christian churches, and other faith buildings. Since 2021, at least 200 religious sites were bombed with air strikes in conflict zones across major states and regions. Air strikes have occurred numerous times even during major Buddhist festivals which resulted in killing and injuring dozens of civilians.

=== Hospitals ===
Human Rights Watch and Physicians for Human Rights reported that the Myanmar military junta's attacks through air-raids on healthcare facilities and workers have severely hampered the emergency response (including during the 2025 Myanmar earthquake). The junta continued to block access to critical medical services in opposition-controlled areas and during military operations. The military has conducted several notable airstrikes on hospitals and medical areas including the 2025 Mrauk U hospital airstrike. The military and allied forces have attacked at least 263 healthcare facilities and killed at least 74 health workers, according to the Swiss NGO Insecurity Insight.

=== Residential Homes, Weddings and funerals ===
The Junta has been accused of bombing directly on residential homes killing hundreds around Rakhine, Chin, and Sagaing regions. It has also increasingly targeted civilian gatherings, including weddings and funerals.

== Casualties ==
According to BMC reports, since early 2021 to November 2024, the junta carried out around 4,020 airstrikes nationwide which resulted in approximately 2,250 deaths and about 3,400 injuries. Sagaing Region experienced the most airstrikes of any region with more than 700 airstrikes. Northern Shan State has suffered 680 airstrikes, the second most during the period and Rakhine State has experienced around 600 airstrikes, the third most during the period.

According to Radio Free Asia, from 2021 to 2024, the airstrikes has led to 5,489 civilian casualties with around 1,769 dead and 3,720 injured.

In the year 2025 alone, the junta has conducted 5,608 aerial attacks killing approximately 2,181 civilians.

== See also ==
- War crimes during the Myanmar civil war (2021–present)
- Spillover of the Myanmar civil war (2021–present)
- Timeline of the Myanmar civil war (2021–present)
- Women in the Myanmar civil war (2021–present)
