= Wai Hun Aung =

Rakhine politician, writer, and charity leader

- ဝေဟင်အောင်
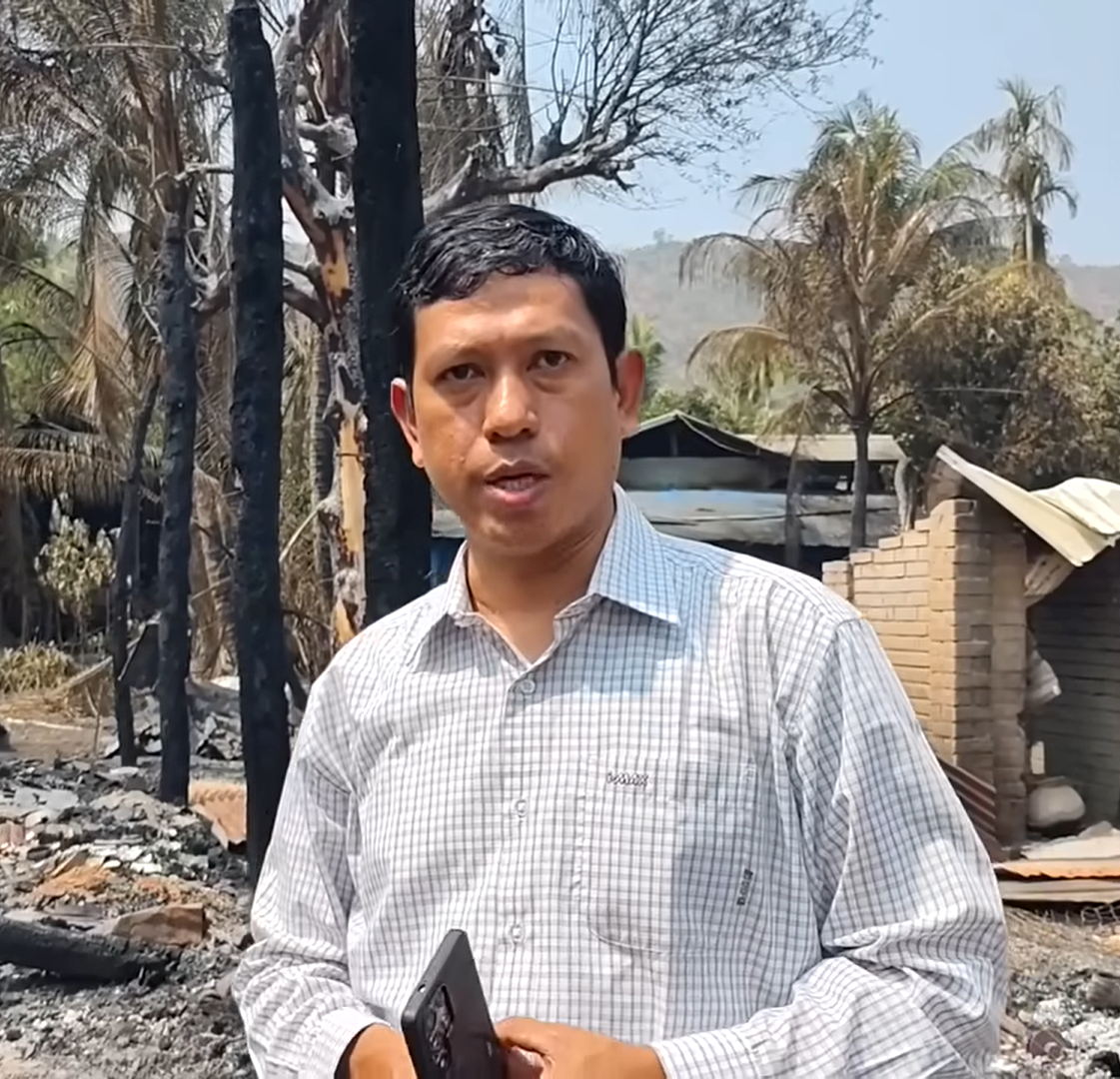
- Aung during an interview with Myanmar Now News after the military bombed a market area in Ponnagyun Township, Rakhine State

Personal details
- Born: Ponnagyun Township, Rakhine State Myanmar.
- Occupation: Activist and Charity leader

Wai Hun Aung (Burmese: ဝေဟင်အောင်) is an Arakanese writer, politician, and charity leader from Rakhine State, Myanmar. He works as a senior official for rescue operations in Rakhine where his reporting and updates have been referenced by various media outlets in their reporting on events in Arakan Army territorties.

== Early life ==
He is born Aung Kyaw Win in Ponnagyun Township, Rakhine State.

== Activism ==
In January 2018, Wai Hun Aung and another Rakhine politician Dr. Aye Maung were detained over remarks they made earlier that month during an event in Rathedaung Township on the 233rd anniversary of the fall of the Arakan kingdom to the Burmese in 1785. It is reported that he spoke about the need for a revolution to restore Rakhine sovereignty.

In 2019 he was sentenced for 20 years in prison for high treason and two more years for sedition cases. Later, he was released in February 2021 as part of junta's Union Day mass amnesty.

In May 2023, the Myanmar military government arrested Wai Hun Aung, including his daughter when they were traveling from Sittwe to Ponnagyun Township to deliver humanitarian aid to communities affected by the Cyclone Mocha. He was detained for suspected of carrying illegal items in charity car. A day later after arrest he was released after no solid proof of suspicion was found.

During an interview with the BBC in 2026, Wai Hun Aung stated the Kaladan project is strategically important for India due to the Sittwe port's role in regional trade, adding that military operations by Arakan Army are carried out through planned phases of attack, capture, and control.

On 8 June 2026, his home in Sittwe was sealed by the Rakhine State Government police claiming allegations of links to the AA.

== Philanthropy ==
He has a charity group run by his own name as the "Wai Hun Aung Charity Group". The organization works on providing necessary assistance to displaced people in Rakhine State. In July 2025, his organization has provided approximately 500 million kyats to over 4,000 displaced people in Ann and Mrauk-U townships. After the 2025 Mrauk U hospital bombing, the group has donated 4.1 billion kyats to the victims and damaged hospital.

== Personal life ==
He is married to Daw Aye Aye Nwe and has a daughter.
