= Rohingya crisis =

Rohingya crisis may refer to

- Rohingya conflict, an ongoing conflict in Myanmar
- Rohingya massacres (disambiguation)
- Rohingya genocide, persecutions by the Myanmar government against the Muslim Rohingya people beginning in 2016
- 2015 Rohingya refugee crisis, the mass migration of people from Myanmar in 2015
