= Maung Nu massacre =

Mass killings in Myanmar

- Location: 20°57′03″N 92°31′49″E; Maung Nu, Rakhine State, Myanmar
- Date: 27 August 2017; 11:00 AM (UTC+6:30)
- Target: Rohingya Muslims
- Attack type: Massacre
- Weapons: Machine guns and knives
- Deaths: 82 killed or missing 37 survivors
- Perpetrators: Myanmar Army (Battalion 564)
- Motive: Anti-Rohingya sentiment, Islamophobia

The Maung Nu massacre was a mass-killing of Rohingya people by the Myanmar Army that reportedly happened in the village of Maung Nu (also known as Monu Para), in Rakhine State, Myanmar on 27 August 2017. In February 2018, video evidence emerged allegedly showing government-contracted workers bulldozing parts of Maung Nu, with visible body bags and corpses in the footage.

== Background ==
The Rohingya people are an ethnic minority that mainly live in the northern region of Rakhine State, Myanmar, and have been described as one of the world's most persecuted minorities. In modern times, the persecution of Rohingyas in Myanmar dates back to the 1970s. Since then, Rohingya people have regularly been made the target of persecution by the government and nationalist Buddhists. The tension between various religious groups in the country had often been exploited by the past military governments of Myanmar. According to Amnesty International, the Rohingya have suffered from human rights violations under past military dictatorships since 1978, and many have fled to neighbouring Bangladesh as a result. In 2005, the United Nations High Commissioner for Refugees had assisted with the repatriation of Rohingyas from Bangladesh, but allegations of human rights abuses in the refugee camps threatened this effort. In 2015, 140,000 Rohingyas remained in IDP camps after communal riots in 2012.

On 25 August 2017, insurgents of the Arakan Rohingya Salvation Army (ARSA) launched their second large-scale attack on the Myanmar Army, leading to new "clearance operations" by the government, which critics argue targeted civilians. Many Rohingyas sought refuge at Maung Nu, after fleeing neighbouring villages upon hearing gunfire.

== Massacre ==
At around 11:00 AM on 27 August 2017, dozens of Myanmar Army soldiers from Battalion 564 arrived in Maung Nu, prompting most of the Rohingya villagers to hide in their homes. According to 37 alleged survivors of the massacre, a soldier demanded that the villagers come outside, and when nobody did the soldiers opened fire on the homes. Soldier then stormed into the homes, looting valuables, assaulting women, and detaining men and boys. Some of the men detained were allegedly executed afterwards on the order of the commanding officer.

== See also ==
- Gu Dar Pyin massacre
- Inn Din massacre
- 2017 Rohingya persecution in Myanmar
- List of massacres in Myanmar
