= Tar Taing massacre =

2023 mass killing in Sagaing Region, Myanmar

Coordinates: 21°55′59.4″N 95°38′41.4″E

- Part of the 2021 Myanmar coup d'état and the Myanmar civil war (2021–present)
- Site of massacre (Myanmar)
- Location: Tadaing, Sagaing Region
- Date: 1–2 March 2023
- Deaths: 17
- Perpetrators: (Myanmar) State Administration Council; Myanmar Army
- Charges: None

The Tar Taing massacre was a mass killing of civilians by Burmese military forces between 1 and 2 March 2023, in the village of Tadaing (variously spelt Tataing, Tar Taing, Tatai, Tartaing, and Tar Tine), Sagaing Region, located 28 miles (45 km) west of Mandalay, Myanmar's 2nd largest city. During the massacre, Myanmar Army troops killed at least 17 civilians, making it one of Myanmar's deadliest civilian massacres in 2023. Just nine days after this massacre, military troops killed at least 28 additional individuals in the Pinlaung massacre.

== Background ==
On 1 February 2021, the Myanmar Armed Forces staged a coup d'état and deposed the democratically elected government led by the National League for Democracy. Shortly thereafter, the military established a junta, the State Administration Council (SAC), and declared a national state of emergency. In response, civilians throughout the country staged large-scale protests to resist the military takeover.

By May 2021, the civilian-led resistance had escalated into a civil war against the SAC, which was unwilling to compromise. Tadaing is situated in the traditional Bamar Buddhist heartland, which quickly emerged as a stronghold of resistance against military rule. Tadaing is a small village of approximately 80 households, located at confluence of the Irrawaddy and Mu Rivers, and faces the nearby village of Nyaungyin.

In late February 2023, Myanmar Army troops launched a military offensive in Sagaing Region, where Tadaing is located, to intimidate and suppress local resistance, by burning and raiding villages, executing villagers, and driving thousands of people from their homes. By 23 February, 14 of the 50 townships placed under martial law were located in Sagaing Region.

== Incident ==
Insignia of the 99th LID

On 23 February, a special task force composed of soldiers from the 99th Light Infantry Division was deployed via helicopter into Ayadaw Township, which is located 50 kilometres (31 mi) north of Tadaing, and launched a series of village raids. The soldiers were stationed at the Northwest Military Command in Monywa. During the military offensive, army troops accompanied by Russian-made Mi-35 helicopters, torched and raided entire villages as they advanced toward the confluence of the Irrawaddy and Mu Rivers. On 26 February, an intense fight broke out in the village of Kandaw, after local fighters attempted to defend the village. That day, troops decapitated the heads of four resistance fighters, including two teenagers, in Kandaw and the nearby village of Nyaungpinkan.

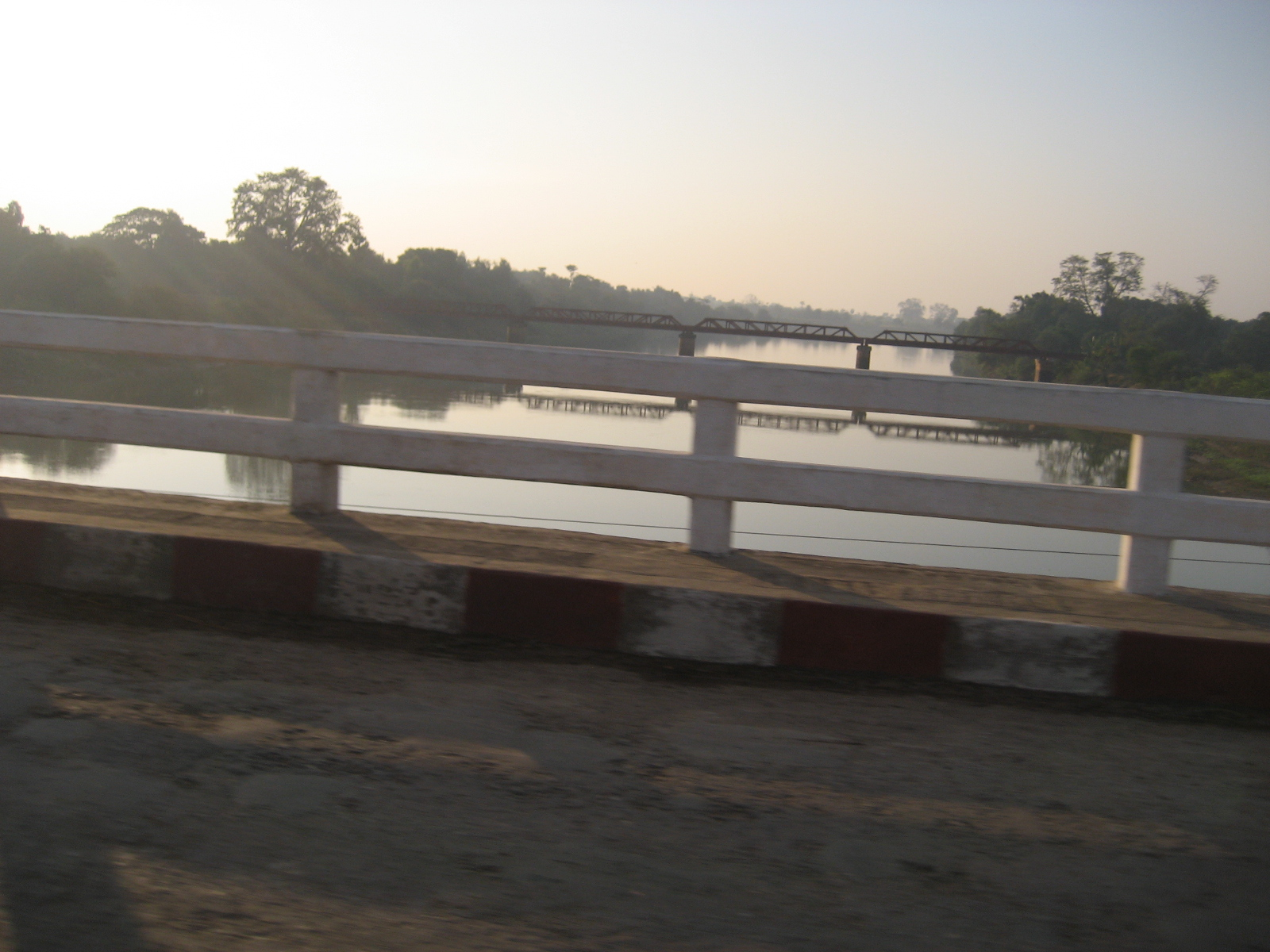
A view of the Mu River

On 1 March, around 3 am, army troops crossed the Mu River, and began raiding the village of Tadaing. Villagers there had not evacuated, under the false assumption that troops would not cross the river. That evening, army troops detained 70 to 100 villagers from Tadaing, taking them as hostage, at a local monastery. Soldiers raided village shops and homes, and tortured villagers throughout the raid.

The following morning, troops took the hostages as human shields, as they marched to the village of Nyaungyin, which is located 4 kilometres (2.5 mi) west of Tadaing. The Demon King Defence Force, a local resistance group, failed to rescue the hostages from troops. Later that day, army troops executed the hostages. Army troops also raped and sexually assaulted at least 3 women before killing them. The corpse of 'Michael' Kyaw Zaw, the only local resistance fighter among the victims, was heavily mutilated, as troops had decapitated and dismembered him, and left him with his internal organs displayed atop of his body. Another civilian, 'Yahu' Naing Lin Aung, was similarly decapitated.

== Perpetrators ==
The attack was carried out by Myanmar Army troops from the 99th Light Infantry Division (LID) under the command of Than Htike, who ultimately reports to Min Aung Hlaing, who also heads the military junta, the State Administration Council. The 99th LID previously led the deadly 2017 military offensives that forced 800,000 Rohingya villagers to flee into Bangladesh. Sagaing locals have described the 99th LID as the 'ogre column' (ဘီလူးစစ်ကြောင်း) due to their violence and brutality.

== Victims ==
All but one of the victims were civilians, and most had been farmers and fishermen. At the time of their deaths, the 17 known victims ranged from the ages of 17 to 67:

1. 'Michael' Kyaw Zaw (aged 47)
2. Kyaw Kyaw (aged 35)
3. Chit Kaung (aged 35)
4. Kyaw Soe (aged 37)
5. Soe Naing (aged 50)
6. U Lin (aged 40)
7. U Tun (aged 40)
8. Aung Aung (aged 40)
9. Ye Lin Aung (aged 25)
10. Thein Htaik (aged 60)
11. Zaw Phyo (aged 17)
12. 'Htila' Kyaw Moe (aged 42)
13. 'Yahu' Naing Lin Aung (aged 25)
14. Win Htay (aged 67)
15. Pan Thwe (aged 37)
16. Pan Nwe (aged 40)
17. Swe Swe Oo (aged 42)

== Aftermath ==
On 4 March, villagers discovered fourteen bodies on a small river sandbank and a mango plantation near Nyaungyin. Most victims had been executed by gunfire, with corpses showing signs of torture. Three additional corpses were also uncovered in Tadaing. Villagers struggled to recover the bodies, as troops had placed land mines around the bodies. Survivors from Tadaing could not return home, as the entire village had been torched.

Between 23 February and 5 March, army troops in the areas surrounding Tadaing killed a total of 99 villagers, beheaded 20 resistance fighters, and raped at least 3 women. After the massacre, military troops continued their offensive, raiding the nearby villages of Letkabin, Phomagyikin, and Alakapa. On 3 March, troops had advanced westward to Alakapa, which is also along the Monywa-Mandalay Road. On 5 March, troops detained Sayadaw Aggavaṃsa, a Mandalay-based monk who had departed to Sagaing, in order to help internally displaced persons. The 99th LID advanced westward, occupying the village of Lekkapin from 5 to 7 March, where troops killed at least 10 more villagers, most of whom had fled the nearby village of Mayogon. Their bodies were found by the Irrawaddy River, and showed signs of torture and mutilation.

== Reactions ==
=== Domestic ===
On 3 March, the opposition National Unity Government of Myanmar (NUG) issued a statement condemning the war crimes and crimes against humanity committed by the Burmese military during the 'brutal' massacre. The NUG has escalated the case, which violates international law, to international judiciary bodies, including the United Nations Security Council and the International Criminal Court. Aung Myo Min, the NUG's minister for human rights, deemed the massacre a democide. The Burmese military has not publicly responded.

=== International ===
As of March 2023, major international organisations and governments have not publicly responded to the massacre. At the 52nd Session of the U.N. Human Rights Council, Volker Türk, the United Nations High Commissioner for Human Rights, accused the military of sharply escalating its use of arson as a weapon against civilians, noting that 1.3 million people have been displaced since the coup, and that 25,000 of the 39,000 houses destroyed by military operations since February 2022 were in Sagaing Region.

== See also ==
- 2021 Myanmar coup d'état
- Myanmar civil war (2021–present)
- List of massacres in Myanmar
