= Bago massacre =

2021 massacre in Bago, Myanmar

Coordinates: 17°19′37″N 96°29′22″E

- Part of the 2021 Myanmar coup d'état and subsequent Myanmar protests (2021–present)
- Site of massacre (Myanmar)
- Location: Bago
- Date: 9 April 2021
- Deaths: 82+ civilians
- Perpetrators: Myanmar Army; Myanmar Police Force
- Charges: None

The Bago massacre was a mass killing of civilians on Friday, 9 April 2021, in the city of Bago, Myanmar. During the massacre, Myanmar Army troops and Myanmar Police Force officers killed at least eighty-two civilians. At the time, the massacre became the single deadliest domestic event to occur since the 2021 Myanmar coup d'état, preceded by the Hlaingthaya massacre less than a month earlier. The Bago massacre accounted for nearly 40% of civilian casualties in April 2021.

== Background ==
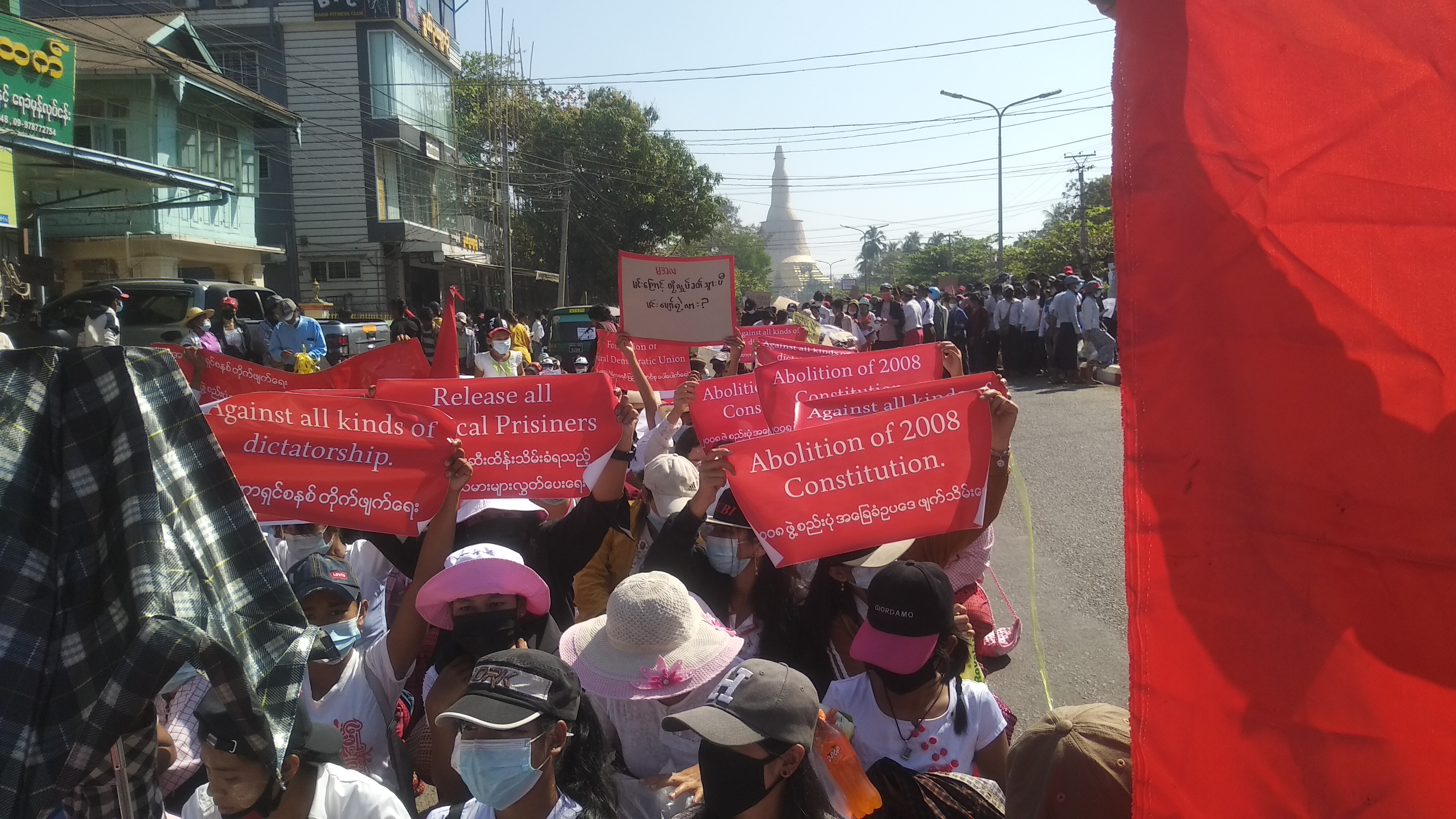
Protesters in Bago in February 2021.

On 1 February 2021, the Myanmar Armed Forces staged a coup d'état and deposed the democratically elected government led by the National League for Democracy. Shortly thereafter, the military established a junta, the State Administration Council, and declared a national state of emergency. In response, civilians throughout the country, including Bago, staged large-scale protests to resist the military takeover. The thoroughfare of Magadit Road, which was dotted with homemade barricades erected by protesters, became a key protest stronghold in Bago.

== Incident ==
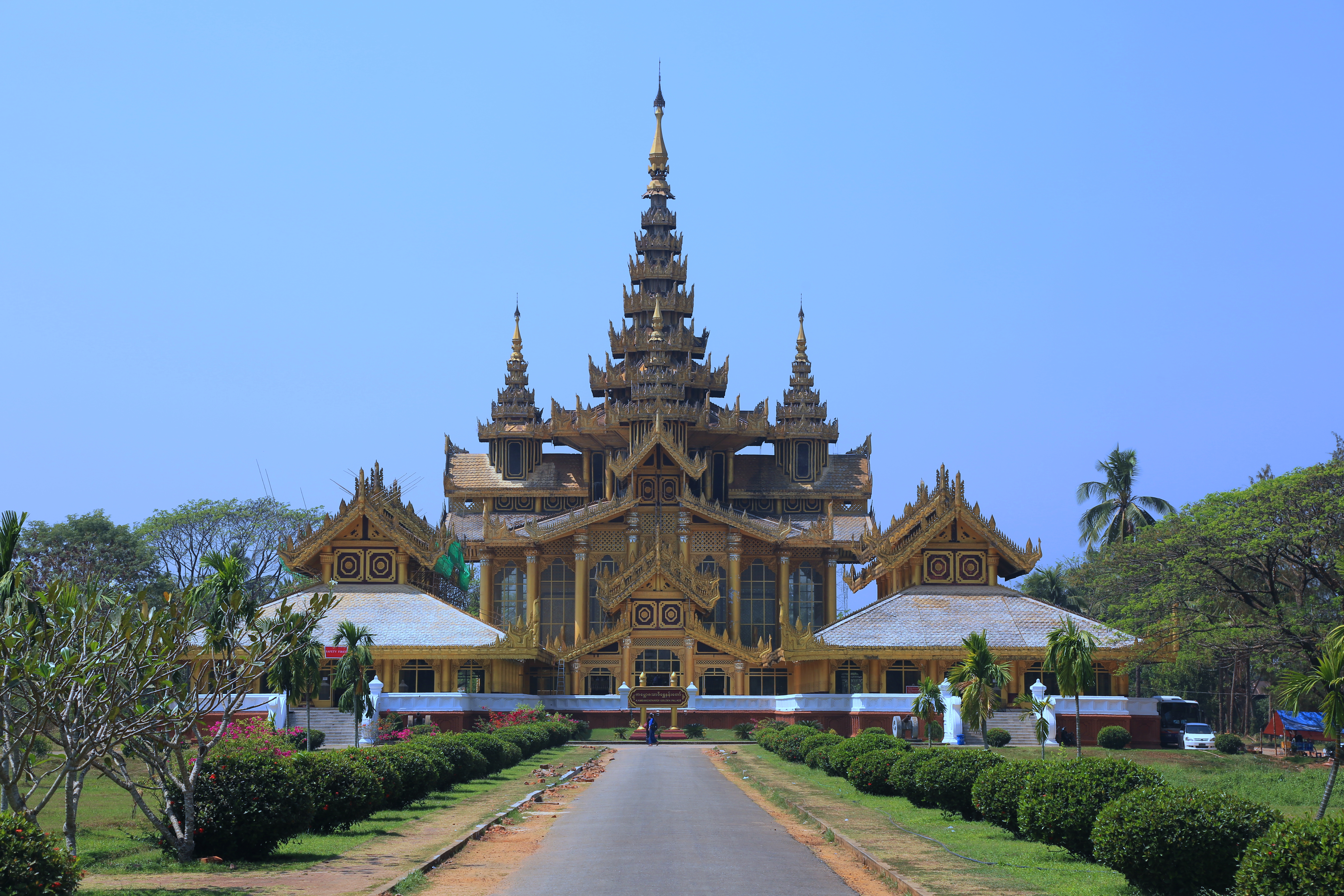
Kanbawzathadi Palace near the site of the massacre.

In the weeks leading up to the massacre, the military junta had implemented a nightly internet shutdown in Bago. During the prior evening, a rumour of an impending military operation had widely circulated among locals. On the morning of 9 April 2021, internet, phone, and electricity services were disconnected in Bago, to hamper coordination and communication among protesters.

At 4 am, the military launched operations with 250 soldiers raiding Bago's residential wards of Shinsawbu, Nantawya, Hmawkan, and Ponnasu, between Magadit and Sandawtwin Roads near the Kanbawzathadi Palace. Military forces blocked all of the city's main roads. By 5 am, security forces began indiscriminately shooting protesters with heavy weaponry as the forces removed ad-hoc roadblocks. Some civilians took defensive measures, launching fireworks and homemade projectiles at advancing forces. By 10 am, security forces had overtaken the last barricade on Sandawtwin Road, effectively establishing full control of the city. Security forces targeted volunteer medics during the massacre, and many victims died of excessive blood loss.

Security forces used counterinsurgency tactics against civilians, which resulted in a high number of casualties. In the immediate aftermath, the Assistance Association for Political Prisoners reported at least 20 deaths. By the following day, the death toll had increased to 82. As of November 2021, at least 50 victims remained unidentified. The Assistance Association for Political Prisoners (AAPP), which has been documenting the lists of fatalities and detention since the Feb.1 coup, said that about 82 people were killed by the regime’s troops during the Bago raids.The Bago University Students' Union said that their members of three university students—Ko Arkar Min Khant, a second-year zoology student, Ko Bo Bo Naing, a first-year zoology student, and Ko Kaung Kyaw Tun, 19, a first-year mathematics student—were killed during the raids.

== Perpetrators ==
The massacre was jointly executed by security forces from the Myanmar Army, including members of the 77th Light Infantry Division (LID), and the Myanmar Police Force An active military base is located 2 kilometres (1.2 mi) north of the massacre site. Security forces used battlefield-grade weapons against civilians, including assault rifles, and heavy weaponry like rocket-propelled and hand grenades. Medical treatment was denied to injured individuals.

== Aftermath ==
Following the massacre, military troops remained stationed near the massacre site. Thereafter, approximately 100,000 residents in the five nearby wards fled their homes. Victims' corpses were temporarily stored at the compound of Shin Sawbu Pagoda (also known as Zeyamuni Pagoda), which was cordoned off. Security forces barricaded the site for several days, rendering it impossible for civilians to retrieve the corpses. Following the crackdown, Bago University Students' Union said that the military demanded payments of 120,000 MMK (US$85) from families to retrieve victims' corpses.

== Reactions ==
=== Domestic ===
The following day, the military-run newspaper, the Global New Light of Myanmar, labelled the protesters as "rioters," and claimed that they had attacked security forces with handmade guns, Molotov cocktails, arrows, and grenades. A protest leader, Ye Htut, likened the massacre to a genocide.

=== International ===
Michelle Bachelet, the United Nations High Commissioner for Human Rights, issued a statement condemning the escalation of indiscriminate violence and use of military-grade weaponry against civilians. She compared the violence to incidents in the Syrian civil war.

On 12 April, the Special Advisory Council for Myanmar called for the United Nations Secretary General to immediately act in response to the crackdown in Bago. Thomas Andrews, the UN's special rapporteur for Myanmar, called the massacre a crime against humanity.

The American embassy in Myanmar mourned the loss of life in Bago. On 10 December 2021, the American government announced it had imposed sanctions on Myo Swe Win, the junta-appointed chief minister of Bago Region, in response to the massacre.

== See also ==
- 2021 Myanmar coup d'état
- Myanmar protests (2021–present)
- List of massacres in Myanmar
