= Gu Dar Pyin =

- Village
- Location in Myanmar (Burma)
- Coordinates: 20°45′12.24″N 92°32′38.76″E
- Country: Myanmar
- Division: Rakhine State
- District: Maungdaw District
- Township: Buthidaung Township
- Time zone: UTC+6.30 (MMT)

Gu Dar Pyin (Burmese: ဂူဒါပြင်) is a village in northern Rakhine State, Myanmar. On 27 August 2017, the Myanmar Army and local Rakhine collaborators massacred an estimated 400 Rohingya villagers in Gu Dar Pyin, and razed the village. Evidence of the massacre was first reported by the Associated Press on 1 February 2018.
