= Lethtoketaw =

Lethtoketaw လက်ထုတ္တော
- Village
- Location in Myanmar (Burma)
- Coordinates: 21°54′49″N 95°24′37″E
- Country: Myanmar
- Region: Sagaing Region
- District: Sagaing District
- Township: Myinmu Township
- Village tract: Lethtoketaw village tract
- Time zone: UTC+6.30 (MMT)

Lethtoketaw (Burmese: လက်ထုတ္တော) is a village in the Lethtoketaw village tract, Myinmu Township, Sagaing Region, Myanmar. Lethtoketaw has 700 houses and is located at the junction of Myaung-Mandalay and Monywa-Mandalay roads.

On 5 May 2023, military junta troops set fire to the village and more than 600 houses were burned.

On 11 May 2024, 32 civilians were massacred and at least two were arrested during a raid carried out by the military against the People's Defense Force.
