= Tar Taing =

Tar Taing တာတိုင်
- Village
- Location in Myanmar (Burma)
- Coordinates: 21°56′00″N 95°38′42″E
- Country: Myanmar
- Region: Sagaing Region
- District: Sagaing District
- Township: Sagaing Township
- Village tract: Shwe Hlay village tract
- Time zone: UTC+6.30 (MMT)
- Postal code: 005001

Tar Taing (Burmese: တာတိုင်; also spelt Tadaing, Tataing, Tatai, Tartaing, or Tar Tine) is a village in the Shwe Hlay village tract, Sagaing Township, Sagaing Region, Myanmar. The village lies near the Irrawaddy River in the southwestern corner of the township. Tar Taing has about 80 households and is near the border with Myinmu and Ngazun Township.

Between 1 and 2 March 2023, Myanmar Army allegedly carried out a massacre of civilians from the village.
