= War crimes in the Myanmar civil war (2021–present) =

The military of Myanmar (Tatmadaw), its allies, and anti-junta factions have committed numerous war crimes and crimes against humanity during the 2021–present Myanmar civil war.

According to a reports, from February 2021 to April 2024, the military junta has conducted 2,471 airstrikes across the country, resulting in the deaths of 1,295 innocent civilians which included women and children and injuring 1,634 others. The attacks also led to the destruction of 187 religious buildings, 114 schools, and 39 hospitals.

== Background ==
The military of Myanmar has been long accused of atrocities over the broader course of the ongoing conflict that has run for decades since 1948. Thaslima Begum, wrote for The Guardian that "widespread sexual violence perpetrated by Myanmar's soldiers has been a hallmark of the culture of abuse and impunity in the country's decades-long civil wars with its ethnic minorities." Matt Wells, the director of Amnesty International's Crisis Response program, has said that "the Myanmar military has a blood-stained résumé of indiscriminate attacks with devastating consequences for civilians".

== Children ==
Both the Tatmadaw and various non-state armed factions have been implicated in war crimes against children, including the recruitment of child soldiers, rape, attacks on schools, abductions, and using schools for military purposes. A boy under 16 from the Ayeyarwady Region who was conscripted by the Tatmadaw, Maung Zin Ko Ko, defected to rebels in Tanintharyi Region with weapons. However, the National Unity Government's Ministry of Defense reaffirmed principles to not recruit anyone under 18 on 29 August 2025.

== People with disabilities ==
According to statements made to an Al Jazeera documentary team, the Tatmadaw conscripts people with profound developmental disabilities at gunpoint where they are forced to attend rudimentary basic training sessions before being sent into battle.

== Prohibited weapons ==
Amnesty International has documented the use of banned cluster munitions by the Tatmadaw in northern Shan State.

== Massacres and civilian attacks ==
=== Junta ===
In October 2023, the Yangon-based Institute for Strategy and Policy wrote that the Tatmadaw had committed 22 massacres in the country since their 2021 coup d'état, defining a massacre as "the killing of 10 or more civilians at once". During the anti-junta forces's Operation 1027 offensive, war crimes and abuses by the Tatmadaw escalated. The military has repeatedly said it does not target civilians and often claims it is resistance forces that commit the violence.

The Tatmadaw has increased the use of its historic four cuts strategy that involves violent collective punishment against civilians. A video showed displaced people scrambling for cover under a cloud of tear gas in Myanmar.

The military used civilians as human shields, forcing people to walk ahead of troops to detonate potential landmines in their path, protecting their own troops.

In late 2021 and throughout 2022 Catholic Bayingyi villages were targeted by the Tatmadaw in Sagaing region, leading to at least 5 civilian deaths.

Over the course of a week in 2023, army troops in Sagaing killed a total of 99 villagers, beheaded 20 resistance fighters, and raped at least 3 women.

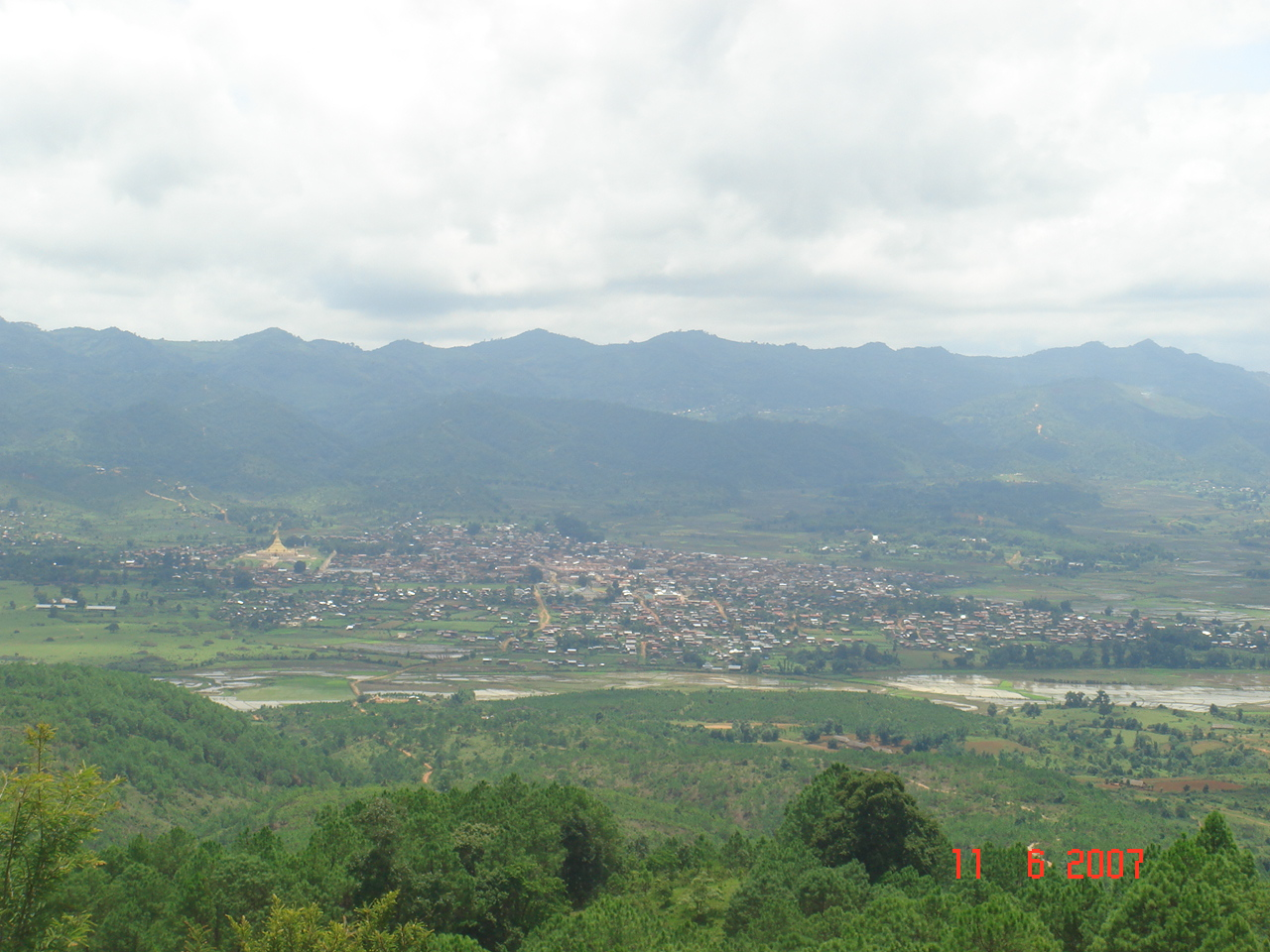
Pinlaung, southern Shan State

In March 2022, army troops tortured and executed at least 30 villagers during the Pinlaung massacre in Shan State, including 3 Buddhist monks. In mid-April, Myanmar Air Force bombed a celebration gathering during the Pazigyi massacre in Sagaing Region, killing at least 165 civilians, including several children, days before Thingyan, the Burmese new year. The junta's spokesperson General Zaw Min Tun stated that they chose to attack the village as the village was allegedly opening a PDF office. The United Nations condemned the attack, citing a disregard of the military's duty to protect civilians.

On 22 March 2025, an airstrike targeted a clinic in the village Hnan Khar in Magway, killing 11 people including a doctor.

In April 2025, in the span of one week, the Myanmar military carried airstrikes on villages of Kywegyan, Sinkhaung, Gazat, and Masein in the Kalewa Township, Sagaing, killing at least five people and injured several others.

On 12 May 2025, at least 22 civilians, including 20 children and two teachers, were killed in an airstrike on a school by the Myanmar Air Force in the village of Oe Htein Kwin, Tabayin in the Sagaing Region.

On 10 December 2025, at least 33 civilians were killed in an airstrike on a hospital by Myanmar Air Force in Mrauk U township of Rakhine State.

On 10 July 2026, at least 20 PDF fighters were killed between Taungtha and Chauk townships. Although the Tatmadaw claimed the rebels were killed in battle, independent analysis of drone footage indicated that some were captured alive before being shot down.

=== Anti-junta ===
On 21 February 2024, two members of the Karenni Nationalities Defence Force murdered a Free Burma Rangers aid worker. They were court-martialed by the KNDF and sentenced to 20 years in prison.

On August 5 and 6, 2024, Arakan Army forces launched attacks along the Myanmar-Bangladesh border, targeting thousands of fleeing Rohingya civilians. According to eyewitnesses and survivors, these assaults resulted in over a hundred deaths, including women and children, as they sought refuge in Bangladesh. In 2025, Human Rights Watch and Fortify Rights accused the Arakan Army of committing widespread abuses against Rohingya civilians in Arakan which includes forced labor, extortion, arbitrary detention, and recruitment of minors. Rohingyas were subjected to movement restrictions, property seizure and forced conscription disguised as “self-defense training.” Leaked videos and survivor testimonies revealed torture, executions and beheadings in AA detention centre. The AA also allegedly burned Rohingya villages in Buthidaung leading to massive displacement. The claims were denied by the Arakan Army.

On 10 July 2025, 8 members of a Shwebo District-based Local PDF were sentenced to 20 years in prison with hard labor for the murder of Catholic priest, Father Donald Martin.

== Attacks on religious buildings ==
According to Amnesty International photo and video analysis, as well as interviews with witnesses, indicated the Myanmar air force had dropped bombs on three locations near the St Peter Baptist Church in Sagaing's Kanan village on 7 January 2024, killed 17 villagers, including nine children, while at least 20 people were injured.

On 24 May 2021, four people were killed and eight others were injured in an attack in Sacred Heart Church by the Tatmadaw near Loikaw, Kayah State.

In 2022, the Tatmadaw looted and torched Catholic chapels in several Bayingyi villages of Sagaing Region, with clergymen targeted and arrested. The village of Chaung Yoe was reportedly the hardest hit, being attacked with artillery, leaving only 20 of the 350 buildings left standing.

On 8 April 2025, several airstrikes by the military junta destroyed a Catholic church in Falam. On 13 April, a Baptist Church in Mindat, Chin State was severely damaged by airstrikes by the military junta.

== Treatment of prisoners of war ==
=== Junta ===
Junta forces have committed severe abuses against captured rebels, including public executions and torture. As an example, on 7 November 2023, two members of the Yaw Defense Force, Phoe Tay and Thar Htaung, were publicly burned to death by junta soldiers and allied Pyusawhti militias members in the Gangaw township's Myauk Khin Yan village, Magway region, after suffering from torture. The military denied it was involved in the execution, though CNN has proven that the incident occurred at a time in which the regime was in full control of the village.

=== Anti-junta ===
Some factions within the anti-junta rebellion allegedly committed abuses against prisoners. Reports of beatings and forced labor from Yaw Defence Force (YDF) prison camps reached news groups such as Myanmar Now. Many of the victims were fellow members of the YDF or civilians.

Around January 2025, rebel forces (including Mobye PDF) attacked a military outpost near a monastery in Kayin State. During the battle, three rebel fighters were killed and four soldiers were killed. One Tatmadaw soldier walked towards the fighters with his weapons, and gave them to the fighters. The insurgents did not restrain him. When the soldier attempted to walk away, the rebels opened fire; two fighters were downed during this incident. As the soldier attempted to crawl, a fighter, "Joseph", killed the unarmed soldier. Joseph later defended his actions and told al-Jazeera that the soldier attempted to expose rebel positions to nearby Tatmadaw units; Joseph further claimed that he shot the soldier dead due to "[not] want[ing] him to suffer anymore," and that he does not feel guilty because "the [soldier] was stupid enough to join the Myanmar military. That's how he should go".

Around April 2025, two members of Battalion 802 of the Naypyidaw PDF allegedly beat and killed a member accused of rape during an interrogation. His body was then buried until November when complaints were sent to the NUG Minister of Defense, Yee Mon, and the Karenni Joint Chiefs of Staff.

On 23 November 2025, a pro-resistance village administrator in Bahin, Myaing Township, and two staff members were detained by the PDF. The administrator died in custody while the staff members remained missing. The incident was allegedly related to a motorcyclist being lashed four times by the administrator's law enforcement for noise violations.

== Pro-junta paramilitaries ==
The pro-junta Pyusawhti militias have been accused of several atrocities against civilians as well as forcibly recruiting local men by threatening to burn down their villages.

== International reactions ==
In February 2024, Amnesty International and SAC-M urged the Security Council to refer Myanmar to the International Criminal Court (ICC). An ICC investigation in Bangladesh/Myanmar on the issue of the deportation of Rohingya from Myanmar to Bangladesh had already been opened in November 2019.

On 27 November 2024, the ICC Prosecutor Karim Khan KC filed an arrest warrant application for the Senior General and acting president Min Aung Hlaing, the commander-in-chief of the Myanmar Defence Services, for his "criminal responsibility for the crimes against humanity of deportation and persecution of the Rohingya, committed in Myanmar, and in part in Bangladesh”. The prosecutor's statement also noted that more arrest warrant applications against high-level Myanmar government officials will follow.
