= Tabayin =

Tabayin ဒီပဲယင်း Dipeyin
- Town
- Location in Burma
- Coordinates: 22°28′17″N 95°09′12″E
- Country: Myanmar
- Region: Sagaing Region
- Township: Ye-U Township
- Township: Tabayin Township

Area
  - Total: 511.85000 sq mi (1,325.68541 km^{2})

Population (2005)
  - Religions: Buddhism
- Time zone: UTC+6.30 (MMT)

Tabayin or Dipeyin (Burmese: ဒီပဲယင်း; [dìbɛ́jɪ́ɴ], also spelled Depayin, Depeyin, or Dabayin) is a town in the Sagaing Region in Myanmar.

== Etymology ==
The town's classical name is Dīparaṅga (ဒီပရင်္ဂ), which means 'continental theatre' or 'dyed field' in Pali. According to the founding myth of Tabayin, when King Sithu I toured the land, the gods assumed the forms of goats and bleated as if they were thirsty. The king saw the signal of the deities and established a settlement on the spot thereafter. The settlement is named 'Dee-pae-yin' ( Here-bleat-those) after the bleat of the divine goats.

== History ==
The settlement of Depayin has been in existence for over 700 years and it was called 'Dhipaesyin' ( ဓိပေအ်သျင်) during the Bagan Dynasty.

Located a few kilometers west of Shwebo, the birthplace of Konbaung dynasty, Tabayin was a major source of many Konbaung soldiers and officials, including the country's most famous general Maha Bandula. Having Tabayin as fief was a powerful symbol before one became king. King Naungdawgyi was Prince of Tabayin before he became the second king of Konbaung dynasty in 1760. Crown Prince Thado Minsaw was another famous Prince of Tabayin, who conquered Arakan (now Rakhine State) in 1784. In 1808, Thado Minsaw's son Prince of Sagaing (later King Bagyidaw) inherited the title Prince of Tabayin.

On 30 May 2003, pro-military mobs perpetrated the Tabayin Massacre, which occurred during a stop in Depayin by opposition leader Aung San Suu Kyi's nationwide tour. The last stanzas of a recent poem titled "Diparinga" (ဒီပရင်္ဂ), which refers to the classical name of Debayin and extols the past glories of the place, by Khin Maung Than, raised the ire of the authorities as they read like a thinly veiled reference to the massacre.

In October 2022, the nearby village of Let Yet Kone became the site of the Let Yet Kone massacre, during which the Myanmar Armed Forces killed 13 civilians, including 6 schoolchildren.

== Transport ==
Tabayin is linked to Monywa, Budalin, Ye-U and Kin-U by road.

== Villages ==
Tabayin Township is also subdivided into 56 Village Tracts which include Ywar Shey Village Tract, Khun Taung Village Tract, Ta Nei Village Tract, Pauk Taw Village Tract, Bagan Village Tract, Let Tee Village Tract, Yin Dway Village Tract, Kyi Village Tract, Wa Bar Village Tract, Taw Kyaung Village Tract, In Taing Lay Village Tract, Sat Pyar Kyin Village Tract, In Boke Village Tract, Paung Taw Ku Village Tract, Na Gar Twin Village Tract, In Taing Gyi Village Tract, Tha Yet Kyin Village Tract, Saing Pyin Village Tract, Kya Khat Village Tract, Pyan Kya Village Tract, Min Te Kone Village Tract, Min Swe Hnit Village Tract, Tha Peik Le Village Tract, Ma Gyi Zauk Village Tract, Ein Yar Village Tract, Thein Bar Village Tract, Ye Kyi Waa Village Tract, Thane Mayar Chan Village Tract, Yet Thit Village Tract, Mu Kan Village Tract, Su Tat Village Tract, Tei Taw Village Tract, Kyaung Shar Taww Village Tract, Taik Village Tract, Boke Htan Taw Village Tract, Mi Chaung Aing Village Tract, Let Hloke Village Tract, Tha Yet Kan Village Tract, Nyaung Hla Village Tract, Na Myar Village Tract, Ma Ya Kan Village Tract, Me Oe Village Tract, Let Yet Kone Village Tract, Daing Nat Village Tract, In Pin Village Tract, Kaing Kan Village Tract, Htone Bo Village Tract, Htaung Tan Village Tract, Htan Ta Pin Village Tract, Na Gar Bo Village Tract, Ma Gyi Oke Village Tract, Tet Khaung Village Tract, Tauk Ka Shat Village Tract, Ohn Ta Pin Village Tract, Thit Yar Aik Village Tract, Sat Lu Village Tract, Se Taw Village Tract, In Kyin Pin Village Tract, In Kyin Tha Poe Village Tract, Chon Ywar Village Tract, Tha Yet Taw Village Tract, and Urban Village Tract. 192 Villages
