= Akyi Pan Pa Lun =

Ahkyipanpalun အကြည်ပန်းပလွန်း
- Village
- Location in Myanmar (Burma)
- Coordinates: 21°26′58″N 94°09′47″E
- Country: Myanmar
- Region: Magway Region
- District: Gangaw District
- Township: Saw Township
- Village tract: Ywatha village tract
- Time zone: UTC+6.30 (MMT)

Ahkyipanpalun (Burmese: အကြည်ပန်းပလွန်းရွာ) is a village in the Ywatha village tract, Saw Township, Magway Region, Myanmar. The village is located 6 miles from north of the town of Kyaukhtu.

On 9 May 2024, Myanmar Air Force launched an air strike to the village monastery killing least 15 civilians and injuring 30.
