= Let Yet Kone =

Village in Sagaing Region, Myanmar

Let Yet Kone လက်ယက်ကုန်း
- Village
- Location in Myanmar (Burma)
- Coordinates: 22°40′36″N 95°24′09″E
- Country: Myanmar
- Division: Sagaing Region
- District: Ye-U District
- Township: Tabayin Township

Population
  - Estimate: 3,000
- Time zone: UTC+6.30 (MMT)

Let Yet Kone (Burmese: လက်ယက်ကုန်း) is a village in Ye-U District, Sagaing Region of Myanmar. Let Yet Kone has about 3,000 villagers living in 400 houses. Most villagers in Let Yet Kone are rice or peanut farmers.

== Massacre ==
On 16 September 2022, Myanmar Air Force's two helicopters fired machine guns and heavier weapons at a monastic school in Let Yet Kone, killing 7 children and injuring 17 others. In addition, the ground column attacked the village after the air attack. After the attack, about 30 children were wounded and 20 children and three teachers were taken way by soldiers.
