= Women in the Myanmar civil war (2021–present) =

The roles that women and gender have played in the Myanmar civil war that began in 2021 have attracted significant attention and commentary.

According to the United States Institute of Peace, "Myanmar’s women have assumed an unprecedented leadership role in the pro-democracy resistance since the 2021 coup." In an August 2024 report, the Assistance Association for Political Prisoners verified at least 1132 women had been killed by the junta since the 2021 coup.

== Background ==
The Myanmar conflict has been ongoing since the country's independence from the United Kingdom in 1948. The conflict has principally consisted of local ethnic armed organisations (EAOs) fighting against the central Burmese government and its army, the Tatmadaw, for autonomy and self-determination. The conflict has significantly escalated since the 2021 Myanmar coup d'état, in which the Tatmadaw overthrew the democratically elected National League for Democracy government to take power as a military junta. The subsequent civil war has seen a number of EAOs and pro-democracy form alliances against the junta, such as the National Unity Government of Myanmar and its armed wing, the People's Defence Force.

== In the military ==
=== In the anti-junta forces ===
Some women have served as combatants during the civil war. According to a The Irrawaddy report on the role of women in the People's Defence Force, "women are part of the PDFs, as well as working as medics, raising funds and supporting the PDF base camps," and "ethnic women have joined ethnic armed organizations (EAOs) such as the KIA, the Karen National Union, Karenni Nationalities Defense Force (KNDF) and the Chin Defence Force (CDF)." According to Nu Nu Lusan of Al Jazeera, anti-junta fighters that she interviewed said that "along with destroying the military dictatorship, they want to overturn traditional gender norms and ensure women play an equal role in building a new nation."

Moe Gyo of Democratic Voice of Burma, however, has written that "while women attend military training and otherwise work within the revolutionary groups, they have almost entirely been assigned to traditional gender-stereotypical roles, such as cooking, sewing/repairing uniforms, cleaning (e.g., captured weapons), filling ammunition clips, preparing improvised explosive devices, etc." According to journalist Emily Fishbein of The New Humanitarian, the "anti-coup movement has upended traditional social norms and brought significant advancement for marginalised groups," however, "the armed resistance remains largely gendered, with few women serving on the front lines or in decision-making roles."

In 2021, the People's Defence Force announced the formation of the Myaung Women Warriors in the Sagaing Region, the first all-women combat unit in the country. The Karenni Nationalities Defence Force was the first ethnic armed organisation (EAO) to form an all-women combat unit, the KNDF Battalion 5, formed in May 2021. Most members of the unit are between 18 and 25 years old, especially university students and young public sector workers who opposed the coup.

=== In the Tatmadaw ===
In February 2024, the Tatmadaw announced that it would begin enforcing conscription, with all women between the ages of 18 and 27 forced to serve at least two years in the military. On International Women's Day 2024, eight Burmese women's organisations, including the Women's League of Burma, condemned the move, saying that conscription violated human rights, especially those of Burmese youth, and expressed concerns over gendered violence that conscripted women would face. Despite originally stating that it would begin conscripting women in the fifth round of conscription, the junta began conscripting women in some regions in the third round, in May 2024.

== Non-military participants ==
=== Anti-junta protestors ===
According to Deutsche Welle, "it was evident from the very beginning that women and their position in society played a special role in the protests" against the junta and the 2021 coup, especially as "the military is particularly steeped in the conservative tradition, seeing itself as the preserver of the "real" Myanmar, in which ethnic minorities and women are relegated to secondary status." According to the International Crisis Group, "prior to the coup, political power in Myanmar lay almost exclusively in the hands of older men," with young protestors using "their position to challenge traditional age and gender norms and push a progressive agenda, particularly in the political sphere."

=== Politicians ===
Ei Thinzar Maung, the National Unity Government's Deputy Minister of Women, Youths and Children Affairs, was awarded the International Women of Courage Award by the United States Department of State in 2022.

=== Human rights activism ===
Women have played leading roles in human rights activism during the civil war. According to Naw Hser Hser of The Diplomat, "women’s rights movement has also become more intersectional than ever. Women from urban and rural backgrounds, different ages, ethnic groups, and religions have united in their shared goal of defeating the Myanmar armed forces, quashing the patriarchy, and ensuring gender equality."

== War crimes and violence against women ==
The Tatmadaw has faced accusations of weaponising sexual violence during the war. Naw Hser Hser of the Women's League of Burma told the United Nations Security Council in July 2023 that sexual violence against civilians was the Tatmadaw's "modus operandi" and that "women risk their lives collecting information [and to provide] other essential services."

=== Online ===
The junta has faced accusations of weaponising sexual violence online against its opponents during the civil war. According to Pallabi Munsi of CNN, "attacks are prevalent online, and doxxing has emerged as a tool used extensively by supporters of the junta to threaten and silence people they see as their opponents... When men are targeted, posts typically insinuate that they are linked to terrorist groups working to bring down the junta, multiple experts from NGOs and digital rights groups in the region told CNN. But when women are doxxed, the attacks frequently feature sexist hate speech, often coupled with explicit sexual imagery and video footage of them."

According to Phyu Sin Shin Thant of The Diplomat, "the junta banned major platforms like Facebook, Messenger, and X (formerly Twitter), conducted random phone searches, and outlawed VPNs, isolating the country from global scrutiny while increasing its ability to monitor citizens," adding that "since the 2021 military coup, Myanmar’s legal system has collapsed amid the ongoing revolution, with the regime losing control and civil war fueling widespread lawlessness, allowing sextortion and other illicit activities to flourish without consequence for the criminals. Revolutionary groups focused on fighting the regime are also unable to address these issues, leaving victims without protection or justice."

== In popular culture ==
In 2024, Mar Mar Gyi of Chiang Mai University released a book titled Invisible Yet Invincible Women Who Dare: Narratives of Myanmar’s Women Warriors Fighting Against Dictators.
