= Chut Pyin massacre =

Massacre of Rohingyas in Myanmar, 2017

- Location: 20°34′12″N 92°38′33″E; Chut Pyin, Rakhine State, Myanmar
- Date: 26 August 2017 (UTC+6:30)
- Target: Rohingya Muslims
- Attack type: Massacre
- Weapons: Machine guns, machetes
- Deaths: 130–358
- Perpetrators: 33rd Light Infantry Division of the Myanmar Army
- Motive: Anti-Rohingya sentiment, Islamophobia

The Chut Pyin massacre was a massacre of Rohingyas by the Myanmar Army and armed Rakhine locals that purportedly took place in the village of Chut Pyin, in Rakhine State, Myanmar on 25 August 2017, the same day Arakan Rohingya Salvation Army (ARSA) insurgents attacked security forces along the Bangladesh–Myanmar border. The event was first brought to attention after a report was published by Human Rights Watch, which detailed accounts of rape and killings from survivors.

== Background ==
The Rohingya people are an ethnic minority that mainly live in the northern region of Rakhine State, Myanmar, and have been described as one of the world's most persecuted minorities. In modern times, the persecution of Rohingyas in Myanmar dates back to the 1970s. Since then, Rohingya people have regularly been made the target of persecution by the government and nationalist Buddhists. The tension between various religious groups in the country had often been exploited by the past military governments of Myanmar. According to Amnesty International, the Rohingya have suffered from human rights violations under past military dictatorships since 1978, and many have fled to neighbouring Bangladesh as a result. In 2005, the United Nations High Commissioner for Refugees had assisted with the repatriation of Rohingyas from Bangladesh, but allegations of human rights abuses in the refugee camps threatened this effort. In 2015, 140,000 Rohingyas remained in IDP camps after communal riots in 2012.

On 25 August 2017, insurgents of the Arakan Rohingya Salvation Army (ARSA) launched a large-scale attack against security forces, leading to new "clearance operations" by the Myanmar government, one of which was conducted in Chut Pyin.

== Massacre ==
According to eyewitnesses, the village of Chut Pyin was razed by Myanmar's security forces and local Rakhines on 26 August 2017, a day after attacks by ARSA on 25 August 2017. Prior to the village's destruction, members of the security forces allegedly threatened and raped Rohingya women, whilst Rohingya men were either killed or detained as ARSA suspects. In September 2017, the death count was reportedly 130; in May 2018, the final death count from violence in Chut Pyin was 358. Satellite imagery released on 16 September 2017 revealed that Chut Pyin had been completely burnt down.

== See also ==
- List of massacres in Myanmar
