= Tula Toli =

Tula Toli Min Gyi
- Village
- Location in Myanmar (Burma)
- Coordinates: 21°08′03″N 92°19′25″E
- Country: Myanmar
- Division: Rakhine State
- District: Maungdaw District
- Township: Maungdaw Township
- Time zone: UTC+6.30 (MMT)

Tula Toli, also known as Min Gyi, is a village in the Maungdaw District of Rakhine State, Myanmar, near the Bangladesh–Myanmar border. Myanmar Army soldiers carried out a massacre against Rohingyas in the village on 30 August 2017, allegedly with the support of local Rakhines who also resided in the village.
