= Maung Nu =

Maung Nu မောင်နူ Monu Para
- Village
- Location in Myanmar (Burma)
- Coordinates: 20°57′03″N 92°31′49″E
- Country: Myanmar
- Division: Rakhine State
- District: Maungdaw District
- Township: Buthidaung Township
- Time zone: UTC+6.30 (MMT)

Maung Nu (Burmese: မောင်နူ), also known as Monu Para, is a village in the Buthidaung Township of Rakhine State, Myanmar, near the Bangladesh–Myanmar border. It is the site of an alleged massacre by the Myanmar Army, carried out against Rohingyas in the village on 27 August 2017.
