= Tula Toli massacre =

Massacre in Rakhine State, Myanmar

- Location: 21°08′03″N 92°19′25″E; Tula Toli, Rakhine State, Myanmar
- Date: 30 August 2017 (UTC+6:30)
- Target: Rohingya Muslims
- Attack type: Massacre, ethnic cleansing
- Weapons: Assault rifles, machine guns, RPGs
- Deaths: est. 500+
- Perpetrator: Myanmar Army
- Motive: Anti-Rohingya sentiment, Islamophobia

The Tula Toli massacre was a mass-killing of Rohingya people that occurred during a Myanmar Army clearance operation in the village of Tula Toli (also known as Min Gyi), Rakhine State, near the Bangladesh–Myanmar border. According to eyewitnesses, Burmese soldiers carried out the massacre with the support of local Rakhines who also resided in the village. Eyewitnesses state that at least 200 women and 300 children were killed.

Satellite images collected before and after the massacre by Amnesty International showed Rohingya neighbourhoods in Tula Toli completely destroyed, whilst Rakhine neighbourhoods remained intact.

== Background ==
The Rohingya people are an ethnic minority that mainly live in the northern region of Rakhine State, Myanmar, and they have been described as one of the world's most persecuted minorities. In modern times, the persecution of Rohingyas in Myanmar dates back to the 1970s. Since then, Rohingya people have regularly been made the target of persecution by the government and nationalist Buddhists. The tension between various religious groups in the country had often been exploited by the past military governments of Myanmar. According to Amnesty International, the Rohingya have suffered from human rights violations under past military dictatorships since 1978, and many have fled to neighbouring Bangladesh as a result. In 2005, the United Nations High Commissioner for Refugees had assisted with the repatriation of Rohingyas from Bangladesh, but allegations of human rights abuses in the refugee camps threatened this effort. In 2015, 140,000 Rohingyas remained in IDP camps after communal riots in 2012.

On 9 October 2016, insurgents of the Arakan Rohingya Salvation Army (ARSA) launched their first large-scale attack on Burmese border posts on the Bangladesh–Myanmar border, with a second large-scale attack on 25 August 2017, leading to new "clearance operations" by the government, one of which was conducted in Tula Toli.

== Prelude ==
According to eyewitnesses, a group of around 90 Myanmar Army soldiers arrived in Tula Toli three days prior to the massacre and ordered the villagers to move to an area which is located east of the settlement, locals call the area "the sands" because of its infertile soil. The commander of the soldiers ordered the villagers not to flee and he also ordered the villagers to continue farming and fishing, and he also warned them that "If you run, we will shoot." Villagers who escaped from the massacre claim that during the briefing, soldiers and collaborators who live in Rakhine went to all of the huts which were inhabited by Rohingyas to loot valuables and detain people at random.

The day before the massacre at Tula Toli, residents from Dual Toli, a village which is located across the river, swam over to Tula Toli in an attempt to escape from an attack which soldiers launched on their village. According to eyewitnesses, ten of those who were fleeing from the attack drowned in the river. Dual Toli was razed and burnt to the ground as the residents of Tula Toli helplessly watched.

== Massacre ==
On the morning of 30 August 2017, the Myanmar Army and local collaborators surrounded Tula Toli and blocked off all the exit points. The Rakhine chairman of the village assured the Rohingya villagers that the soldiers would not harm them, but that their homes would be torched. He then told the villagers to assemble in one place where they would be safe. By the end of the morning, the huts of Rohingyas in the village were all burnt down. Satellite images provided by Amnesty International show all the Rohingya huts in the village burnt, whilst the Rakhine ones remained intact.

Women and children were separated from the men first and were told to sit next to the river. Women in the river were ordered to get out and sit down along the riverbank. After a while they were all ordered to stand up, then sit down again. Finally they were ordered to stand, and the soldiers shouted at the women to run. As they started running, the soldiers opened fire on them. Some of the women attempted to escape the bullets by swimming across the river, only to drown in the river's current. Babies and young children were thrown into a river by soldiers.

According to survivors, the men were lined up along the riverbank and shot by automatic rifles, decapitated, burned alive, lynched or blown up by rocket-propelled grenades. The soldiers paused for a moment afterwards and shouted for any survivors to stand up, then fired their rifles again to ensure the victims' deaths. The bodies were buried in mass graves alongside the riverbank by the army and burnt to avoid leaving evidence of the massacre.

In a BBC World Service Newshour interview, filmmaker Shafiur Rahman described how testimonies gathered for his documentary suggested the military operation at Tula Toli was pre-planned.

== Aftermath ==
After the massacre, a group of around 30 women were still alive. They alleged that the soldiers told them to wait along the river again, where they divided them into groups of five, took them into nearby huts and raped them. After raping them, the soldiers allegedly stole their jewelry, beat them and set their huts ablaze. According to a survivor of the massacre, a group of children managed to escape from the massacre by taking shelter in a nearby paddy field, but later, they were captured, placed on the floor and impaled by the military. Then, the military threw their bodies in the river.

== See also ==
- Gu Dar Pyin massacre
- Inn Din massacre
- 2017 Rohingya persecution in Myanmar
- List of massacres in Myanmar
