= Chut Pyin =

Village in Rakhine State, Myanmar

Chut Pyin ချွတ်ပြင်
- Village
- Location in Myanmar (Burma)
- Coordinates: 20°34′11″N 92°38′30″E
- Country: Myanmar
- Division: Rakhine State
- District: Sittwe District
- Township: Rathedaung Township
- Time zone: UTC+6.30 (MMT)

Chut Pyin (Burmese: ချွတ်ပြင်) is a village in the Rathedaung Township of Rakhine State, Myanmar. It is the site of an alleged massacre by the Myanmar Army, carried out against Rohingyas in the village on 26 August 2017.
