= Mrauk-U Township =

Township in Rakhine State, Myanmar

Mrauk-U Township မြောက်ဦးမြို့နယ်
- Township
- Location in Mrauk-U district
- Coordinates: 20.6°N 93.2°E
- Country: Myanmar
- State: Rakhine State
- District: Mrauk-U District

Area
  - Total: 490.97 sq mi (1,271.6 km^{2})

Population (2019)
  - Total: 244,981
  - Density: 498.97/sq mi (192.65/km^{2})
  - Ethnicities: Rakhine; Chin
  - Religions: Buddhism; Christian
- Time zone: UTC+6:30 (MMT)

Mrauk-U Township (Burmese: မြောက်ဦးမြို့နယ်) is a township of Mrauk-U District in the Rakhine State of Myanmar. The principal town is Mrauk-U, which contains the township's 7 urban wards. The township additionally is divided into 96 village tracts, grouping a total of 248 villages.
