= Gu Dar Pyin massacre =

2017 massacre in Rakhine State, Myanmar

- Location: 20.7534°N 92.5441°E; Gu Dar Pyin, Rakhine State, Myanmar
- Date: 27 August 2017; 12:00 PM (UTC+6:30)
- Target: Rohingya Muslims
- Attack type: Massacre
- Weapons: Assault rifles, machine guns, knives, machetes, rocket launchers, and grenades
- Deaths: 10 (government claim); 75–400+ (local estimates)
- Perpetrators: Myanmar Army and armed locals
- Motive: Anti-Rohingya sentiment, Islamophobia

The Gu Dar Pyin massacre was a mass-killing of Rohingya people by the Myanmar Army and armed Rakhine locals that reportedly happened in the village of Gu Dar Pyin, in Rakhine State, Myanmar on 27 August 2017. According to eyewitness testimony and video evidence first reported by the Associated Press, victims of the massacre were buried in five mass graves by the Myanmar Army and burnt with acid. An official count given by the Burmese government put the death toll at ten, whilst Rohingya village elders recorded a list of 75 people who may have died in the massacre and locals estimated that up to 400 people were killed in the massacre.

== Background ==
The Rohingya people are an ethnic minority that mainly live in the northern region of Rakhine State, Myanmar, and have been described as one of the world's most persecuted minorities. In modern times, the persecution of Rohingyas in Myanmar dates back to the 1970s. Since then, Rohingya people have regularly been made the target of persecution by the government and nationalist Buddhists. The tension between various religious groups in the country had often been exploited by the past military governments of Myanmar. According to Amnesty International, the Rohingya have suffered from human rights violations under past military dictatorships since 1978, and many have fled to neighbouring Bangladesh as a result. In 2005, the United Nations High Commissioner for Refugees had assisted with the repatriation of Rohingyas from Bangladesh, but allegations of human rights abuses in the refugee camps threatened this effort. In 2015, 140,000 Rohingyas remained in IDP camps after communal riots in 2012.

On 25 August 2017, insurgents of the Arakan Rohingya Salvation Army (ARSA) launched their second large-scale attack on the Myanmar Army, leading to new "clearance operations" by the government, which critics argue targeted civilians.

== Massacre ==
According to survivors of the massacre, the Myanmar Army had planned out and prepared for the massacre prior to it happening; this was possibly done with the intent of enacting revenge for attacks made by the Arakan Rohingya Salvation Army (ARSA). Locals in Gu Dar Pyin spotted soldiers buying twelve large containers of acid near the village market two days prior to the massacre. On 27 August 2017, at around noon, over 200 soldiers from the Tatmadaw stormed Gu Dar Pyin from a Buddhist village to the south, firing on fleeing Rohingya villagers. Many of those fleeing hid in a coconut grove near the river and watched as the Myanmar Army and masked local collaborators looted homes of valuables before burning them down. Afterwards, Myanmar Army soldiers and their collaborators began searching for survivors in the grove, executing those found. According to eyewitnesses, children and elderly were thrown into burning huts by soldiers.

Another group of soldiers surrounded Gu Dar Pyin from the north whilst soldiers were still searching in the grove, entrapping remaining Rohingyas in Gu Dar Pyin. Some survivors of the initial attack managed to hide under a bridge near Gu Dar Pyin as soldiers began burning corpses with acid and loading them onto three trucks heading for the cemetery. One eyewitness described watching the village burn for 16 hours until the Myanmar Army finally withdrew.

== Aftermath ==
Days after the massacre, survivors and Rohingyas from nearby villages went back to the charred remains of Gu Dar Pyin to retrieve victims left for dead and corpses the Myanmar Army had left behind.

The Associated Press stated on 1 February 2018 that it had confirmed the massacre took place in Gu Dar Pyin, after interviewing over two dozen survivors and obtaining video evidence of the mass killing and its aftermath. Myanmar's government responded by insisting the massacre never happened, and that only 19 "terrorists" were killed and "carefully buried" in the village.

== Responses ==
Myanmar: The Myanmar government's information committee issued a statement on 2 February 2018, denying the accusations that a massacre took place, stating that a team of 17 government officials were sent to Gu Dar Pyin and returned without evidence or confirmation from villagers that it happened. The statement further claimed that only 19 "terrorists" were killed in Gu Dar Pyin by security forces "acting in self-defense". An Associated Press spokesperson rejected the government's claims, saying, "The Associated Press stands by our reporting."

United States: The day after the Associated Press confirmed the existence of the mass graves, U.S. State Department spokeswoman Heather Nauert said in a press briefing, "We are deeply, deeply troubled by those reports of mass graves [in Myanmar]. We are watching this very carefully. We remain focused on helping to ensure the accountability for those responsible for human rights abuses and violations."

== See also ==
- Inn Din massacre
- Tula Toli massacre
- 2017 Rohingya persecution in Myanmar
- List of massacres in Myanmar
