= Monastic schools in Myanmar =

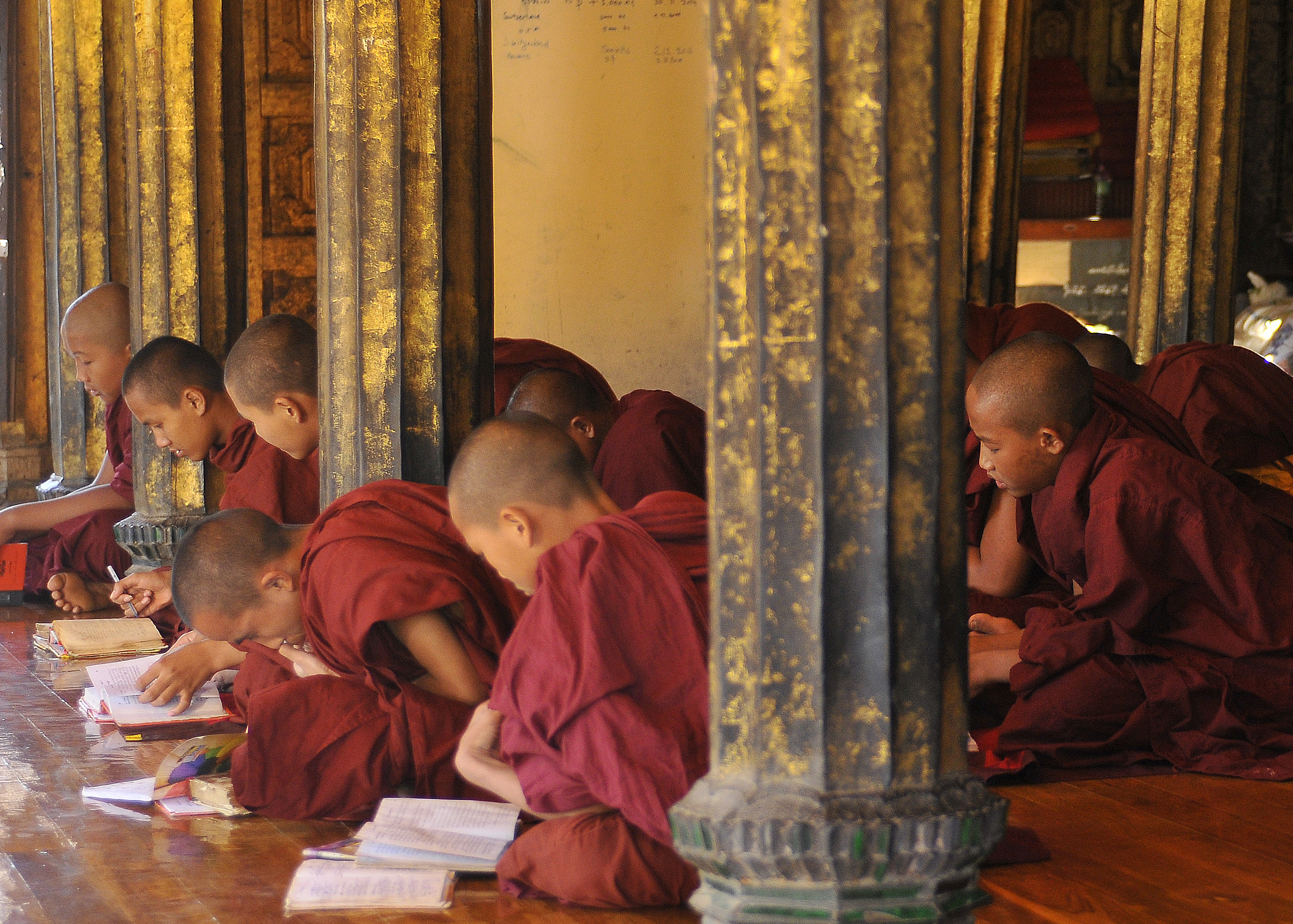
Novices in a modern monastic school in Taunggyi, Shan State

The Buddhist monastic school system in Myanmar is an old education system dated back to the 11th century. The schools were decentralised and provided education to all boys, across backgrounds, in Buddhist scriptures. The schools served mostly to instill moral values, support cultural assimilation and increase literacy- all aspects of the system that provided the Burmese monarch with religious and social legitimacy. The system survived through the British colonial period and was encouraged to fill a perceived gap in the secular schooling system, ultimately being co-opted by the socialist government after the 1962 coup d'état.

== Pre-colonial schooling ==
The monastic schooling is best documented in lowland Burma, with historical records dating back to the 11th century during the Bagan Kingdom. There is some evidence that the system began in earlier Mon-dominated Kingdoms. The Pyu city-states had some form of monastic school, with boys and girls attending monasteries or convents as novices.

In pre-colonial Burma, the Sangha was the primary educational institution. The Burmese word for school, kyaung, is synonymous with the word for monastery from this connection. In dynastic Burma, one of the main Buddhist obligations of the king was to provide welfare to the people. The schools were independent from the government, often supported by local donations to the monastery. The state, however, had a vital interest in its development and promulgation. The various dynasties that ruled lowland Burma built monasteries and provided charity to attract and support the monastic school system. This in turn provided religious legitimacy through direct welfare in the lives of ordinary people. However, for most agriculturalist rural villages, students had little need for the Pali language instruction in Buddhist scripture. Instead, the teaching served two practical purposes; they instilled moral character into young Bamar men and 'civilised' conquered non-Bamar minorities by imbuing religious and cultural values.

The schools provided important education needs throughout Myanmar's history and they were the only source of education for lives ranging from royal princes to unskilled workers. The Buddhist monastic schools helped to give Myanmar a rate of literacy considerably above those of other East Asian countries in the early 1900s. In 1931, 56% of males over the age of five and 16.5% of females were literate — approximately four times as high as those reported for India at the same time. Early European travellers and later British colonial administrators acknowledged the impressive literacy rate, supported by regular censuses of literacy conducted by various kings to prove their efficacy and legitimacy. Even as early as the 17th century, a Venetian traveller noted that the kingdom was governed by pen, with many people needing paper and writing to travel between even rural villages.

The schooling system, by nature of its monastic code, was only available to boys. Girls were educated at home, gaining basic literacy skills and other home or marketplace skills. There is, however, evidence of a much smaller parallel system run by educated laypeople for female students.

== Post-independence monastic schools ==
Upon independence in 1948, the Burmese government centralised schooling, basing it on state funding. However, the government recognised the role of religious instruction in providing moral character and enshrining Burmese tradition. The civil insurgencies that broke out soon after independence were socially attributed, in part, to the inadequacies of secular schools in rooting out anti-social behaviours. After the 1962 coup d'état, the new socialist government nationalised all schools, but those were unable to fill all gaps. The monastic schools were co-opted to fill remaining gaps through the Basic Education Law of 1966 and remodelled to resemble the dynastic system of patronage.

Nowadays, the monastic schools assist in providing basic education needs of the country especially for children from needy families and orphans — filling the significant gap in the education system. The primary school children of Myanmar attend the Buddhist monasteries to acquire literacy and numeracy skills as well as knowledge of the Lord Buddha’s teachings. Thus, the schools provide curriculum education and ethics and moral foundation. Their role as principal education providers may have ceased for many years, but their contribution is still significant in 21st century Myanmar. Supplementing the government elementary schools, they provide underprivileged children all the basic education needs exactly as it does in government elementary schools by using the same curriculum.

Generally, Myanmar monastic schools accept children from needy families who live nearby and are unable to attend government schools. Many of the orphans who attend monastery schools in Yangon and Mandalay are from remote areas and have been sent by senior monks from their villages and small towns. Some operate similarly as boarding schools and some as day schools depending on the situation and support of the public.

The schools are required to cooperate closely with township education authorities to be officially recognized. The operation and finance rely heavily on donations and collaboration from the public. The fees of most of the students at the school were covered by these donations, and some parents were able to make a small contribution.

In the 2004-2005 academic year, there were nearly 1190 monastic schools, providing primary and secondary education to more than 100,000 Myanmar children.
