= Byian Phyu massacre =

2024 killing of civilians by the Myanmar Tatmadaw

- Part of the Myanmar civil war
- Byian Phyu (Myanmar)
- Location: 20.170065°N 92.896660°E; Byian Phyu, Rakhine State, Myanmar
- Date: 29–31 May 2024
- Deaths: 76
- Injuries: Unknown
- Perpetrators: Tatmadaw; Rohingya militias Arakan Liberation Army (denied by ALA)
- Motive: Suspicions of Arakha Army sympathies in the village

The Byian Phyu Massacre (Burmese: ဗျိုင်းဖြူရွာ သတ်ဖြတ်ခံရခြင်း, alternatively spelt Byai Phyu or Byaing Phyu) occurred over two days in late May 2024 during the Myanmar civil war where 76 people were tortured and killed by the Tatmadaw in Byian Phyu, Sittwe Township.

== Background ==
Following the 2021 Myanmar coup d'etat, civil war resurged in Myanmar. In late 2023, the Arakha Army launched the Rakhine offensive and swept through most of northern Rakhine State, becoming one of the most effective ethnic fighting forces in Myanmar. Byian Phyu is a village just outside the state capital of Sittwe.

== Events ==
Around noon on 29 May 2024, around 170 soldiers from the Tatmadaw entered the village of Byian Phyu and extrajudicially killed over 70 of the villages residents due to suspicions of Arakha Army and Karen National Liberation Army sympathies.

According to villagers, State Administration Council soldiers went door to door in Byian Phyu and checked houses with lists of household members. Some people were beaten, with three allegedly killed by beatings and other men being taken away. The soldiers then ordered all residents all villagers to gather.

The soldiers forced all of the villagers into the centre of the village, where the men were separated from the women and children. The men were taken away in trucks, tortured and killed, while several women were raped by the soldiers. The soldiers denied the women and children food, water, and shelter until the next day. Eyewitness reports said that everyone was forced outside in the hot sun and that they were forced to drink the soldiers' urine. The soldiers cut off the skin of men who had tattoos supportive of the Arakha Army and set them on fire. The army torched over 80 homes and the village monastery, and abducted over 100 remaining village inhabitants for "interrogation". 3 days later, junta soldiers burned down the nearby villages of Minkin Taw Ywar Thit and Minkin Taw Ywar Haung.

On 7 June, the junta released 47 of the over 100 abductees. 4 days later, the junta arrested over 40 of the remained abductees after reportedly torturing them during their interrogation.

== Reactions ==
The Arakha Army claimed that the pro-junta Arakan Liberation Army (ALA), an Arakanese insurgent group, participated in the killings, which the ALA denied. The Arakha Army pledged to punish all Tatmadaw and ALA soldiers involved in the massacre.

Junta spokesperson Zaw Min Tun denied the killings, claiming that junta forces had summoned suspected Arakha Army members for questioning and that 3 men had been killed when they had tried to seize an officer's firearm.
