= Thayet Thapin airstrike =

2025 airstrike in Myanmar

Thayet Ta Pin airstrike
- Part of Internal conflict in Myanmar
- Location map of Kyauktaw, in Rakhine State
- Native name: သရက်တပင်ရွာစာသင်ကျောင်းဗုံးကြဲမှု
- Location: 20.859170°N 93.048362°E; Thayet Ta Pin village, Kyauktaw Township, Rakhine State, Myanmar
- Date: 12 September 2025; At 01:00 MMT
- Target: Pyinnyar Pan Khinn, A Myin Thit Private Boarding Schools
- Attack type: Airstrike
- Weapon: Bombs dropped from military aircraft
- Deaths: Up to 20
- Injuries: Two Dozens
- Perpetrator: Tatmadaw (Myanmar military)

The Thayet Thapin airstrike (Burmese: သရက်တပင်ရွာစာသင်ကျောင်းဗုံးကြဲမှု) conducted by the Tatmadaw, the military of Myanmar, on 12 September 2025, targeted two private boarding schools — Pyinnyar Pan Khinn and A Myin Thit — in Thayet Ta Pin village, Kyauktaw Township, Rakhine State. The attack occurred around 1:00 a.m. local time, reportedly while students were asleep in their dormitories. The attack resulted in a death toll of 22 students aged between 14 and 21, and wounded 22 more.

According to the Arakan Army, a military jet dropped two 500-pound bombs on Pyinnyar Pan Khinn and A Myin Thit High Schools while students were sleeping. The strike also damaged nearby homes.

== International response ==
The United Nations Children's Fund (UNICEF) expressed deep concern over the attack, emphasizing the need to protect children and educational institutions in conflict zones.

The ASEAN Parliamentarians for Human Rights (APHR), a regional network of lawmakers in ASEAN, issued a strong condemnation of the Myanmar military's airstrike. APHR described the attack as a "calculated act of terror" and a violation of international humanitarian law. Chairperson Mercy Chriesty Barends called for urgent international action, while Co-Chairperson Charles Santiago and Board Member Wong Chen criticized ASEAN’s response and urged member states to take concrete steps to support democratic forces and hold the junta accountable.

== See also ==
- 2025 Depayin School bombing
