= 2025 Depayin School bombing =

2025 bombing of a school in Depayin, Myanmar

- Part of the Myanmar conflict
- Location map of Depayin, in Sagaing Region
- Native name: ဒီပဲယင်းကျောင်းဗုံးကွဲမှု
- Location: 22.6505°N 95.2084°E; Oe Htein Kwin village, Tabayin Township, Sagaing Region, Myanmar
- Date: 12 May 2025; Around 09:00 MMT
- Target: School operated by the pro-democracy movement
- Attack type: Airstrike
- Weapon: Bombs dropped from military aircraft
- Deaths: Up to 22
- Injuries: Dozens
- Perpetrator: Tatmadaw (Myanmar military)

The 2025 Depayin School bombing (Burmese: ဒီပဲယင်းကျောင်းဗုံးကွဲမှု) was an airstrike carried out by the Tatmadaw, the military of Myanmar, on 12 May 2025, targeting a school in Oe Htein Kwin village, located in Tabayin Township (also known as Depayin), Sagaing Region, Myanmar. The attack resulted in the deaths of up to 22 individuals, including 20 students and two teachers, and injured dozens more. The school was operated by the pro-democracy movement and was in session at the time of the attack. The bombing was done despite the ceasefire announced by military junta.

== Background ==
Since the military coup in February 2021, Myanmar has experienced widespread armed resistance against military rule. The Sagaing Region, particularly Tabayin Township, has been a stronghold of the resistance movement. The Myanmar military has increasingly utilized airstrikes to suppress opposition, often targeting areas with significant civilian populations.

== Attack ==
At around 09:00 MMT on 12 May 2025, a Myanmar military MiG-29 fighter jet carried out an airstrike on a pro-democracy school in Oe Htein Kwin village, dropping two bombs. The school was in session, with students ranging from primary to high school levels. The attack killed up to 20 students and two teachers, and injured more than 102 people. Additionally, three nearby houses were damaged.

Due to this attack, approximately 500 residents from the village where it is home to around 300 households have fled in search of safety.

== Aftermath ==
Eyewitnesses, aid workers, and opposition figures condemned the attack, accusing the military of deliberately targeting civilian areas to erode support for the resistance. The opposition National Unity Government of Myanmar stated that the death toll could rise and highlighted the military's pattern of attacking schools, hospitals, and other civilian infrastructure. The NUG's Ministry of Human Rights condemned the military's systematic targeting of children as a war crime and called for global legal action and UN pressure to end such attacks. Furthermore, a UK Minister and Myanmar's ambassador to United Nations, Kyaw Moe Tun criticized the airstrike.

State-run MRTV television denied the reports of the airstrike, claiming that opposition forces were spreading misinformation and that the military was working to maintain peace in the area.

== See also ==
- 2025 Kyauktaw Thayet Thapin School airstrike
- Depayin massacre
- 2022 Dedebit Elementary School airstrike in Tigray, Ethiopia
- 2021 Myanmar coup d'etat
- Myanmar conflict
- Internal conflict in Myanmar
- Human rights in Myanmar
