= Tabayin Township =

Depeyin Township
- Township
- location in Ye-U district

- location in Sagaing region
- Coordinates: 22°42′N 95°20′E
- Country: Myanmar
- Region: Sagaing Region
- District: Ye-U District
- Capital: Tabayin
- Time zone: UTC+6.30 (MMT)

Tabayin Township (also spelt Depeyin or Depayin) is a township in Ye-U District in the Sagaing Region, Myanmar. The township is located in the north-western part of the country. The principal town is Tabayin.

== History ==
On 12 May 2025, a Myanmar Air Force airstrike targeted a school in Ohteintwin, a small village in Tabayin, killing at least 20 people, including 20 children and two teachers. The military junta, the State Administration Council called the airstrike, dubbed the 2025 Depayin School bombing, "fabricated news."
