= Sittwe =

Capital of Rakhine State, Myanmar

Sittwe စစ်တွေ
- Capital Town
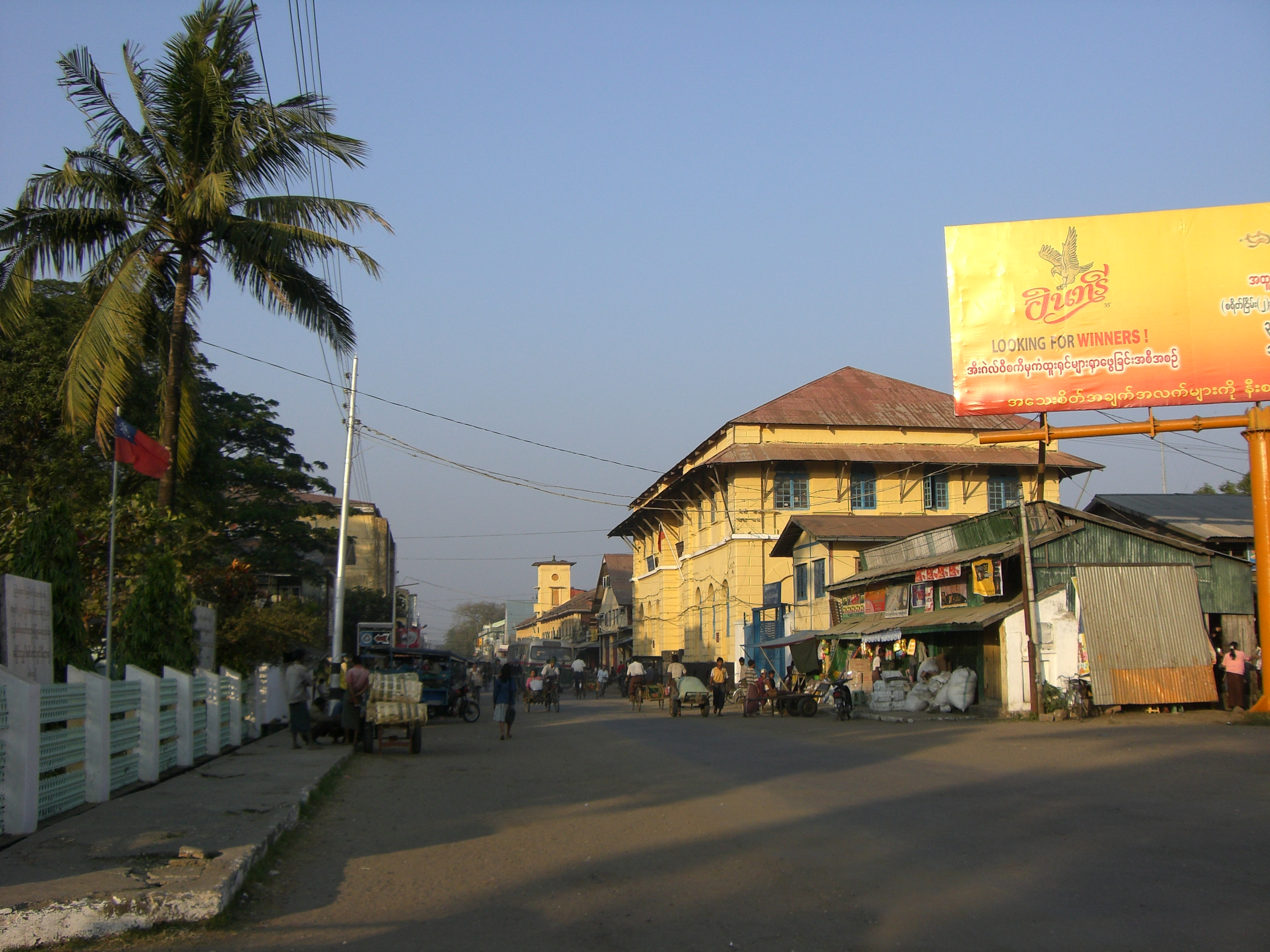
- Sittwe main street
- Interactive map of Sittwe
- Coordinates: 20°08′13″N 92°53′06″E
- Country: Myanmar
- State: Rakhine State
- District: Sittwe District
- Township: Sittwe Township

Government
  - Mayor: U Myint Soe Win (USDP)

Area
  - Total: 6 sq mi (16 km^{2})

Population (2019)
  - Total: 124,679
  - Density: 21,000/sq mi (8,000/km^{2})
  - Ethnicities: Rakhine; Rohingya; Bamar; Daingnet; Bengali; Kaman; Maramagyi; Mro; Thet
  - Religions: Buddhism; Islam; Christianity; Hinduism
- Time zone: UTC+6.30 (MMT)
- Area codes: 42, 43
- Climate: Am

Sittwe (Burmese: စစ်တွေမြို့, MLCTS: cac twe mrui., Burmese pronunciation: [sɪʔtwè mjo̰]), formerly Akyab (Burmese: အာကျပ်, MLCTS: a kyap), is the capital of Rakhine State, Myanmar (Burma). Sittwe is located on an estuarial island created at the confluence of the Kaladan, Mayu, and Lay Mro rivers emptying into the Bay of Bengal. As of 2019 the city has an estimated population of over 120,000 inhabitants. It is the administrative seat of Sittwe Township and Sittwe District.

== Names ==
The name Sittwe (စစ်တွေမြို့) is derived from the Burmese pronunciation of Arakanese စစ်တွေ, meaning "the place where the war meets". When the Burmese king Bodawpaya invaded the Mrauk U Kingdom in 1784, the Rakhine defenders encountered the Burmese force at the mouth of Kaladan river. In the ensuing battle, which was waged on both land and water, the Mrauk U forces were defeated. The place where the battle occurred came to be called Saittwe by the Rakhine and then as Sittwe by the Burmese. The name was initially anglicized as Tset-twe and Site-tway.

According to local traditions, the city's name originated from "Sit-tai" referring to a place where Arakan royal naval forces would temporarily rest and camp. Over time, the name gradually evolved into "Sittwe".

The colonial name Akyab (အာကျပ်) derived from the town's hill Akyatkundaw or A-khyat-dau-kun (ကုန်း), named for one of its four stupas whose own name Ankyeit, Akyattaw, Akyatdaw or Ahkyaib-daw ("Royal Rear-Jaw Pagoda") referenced its supposed possession of a Buddhist relic, a rear section of Siddhartha Gautama's jawbone.

== History ==
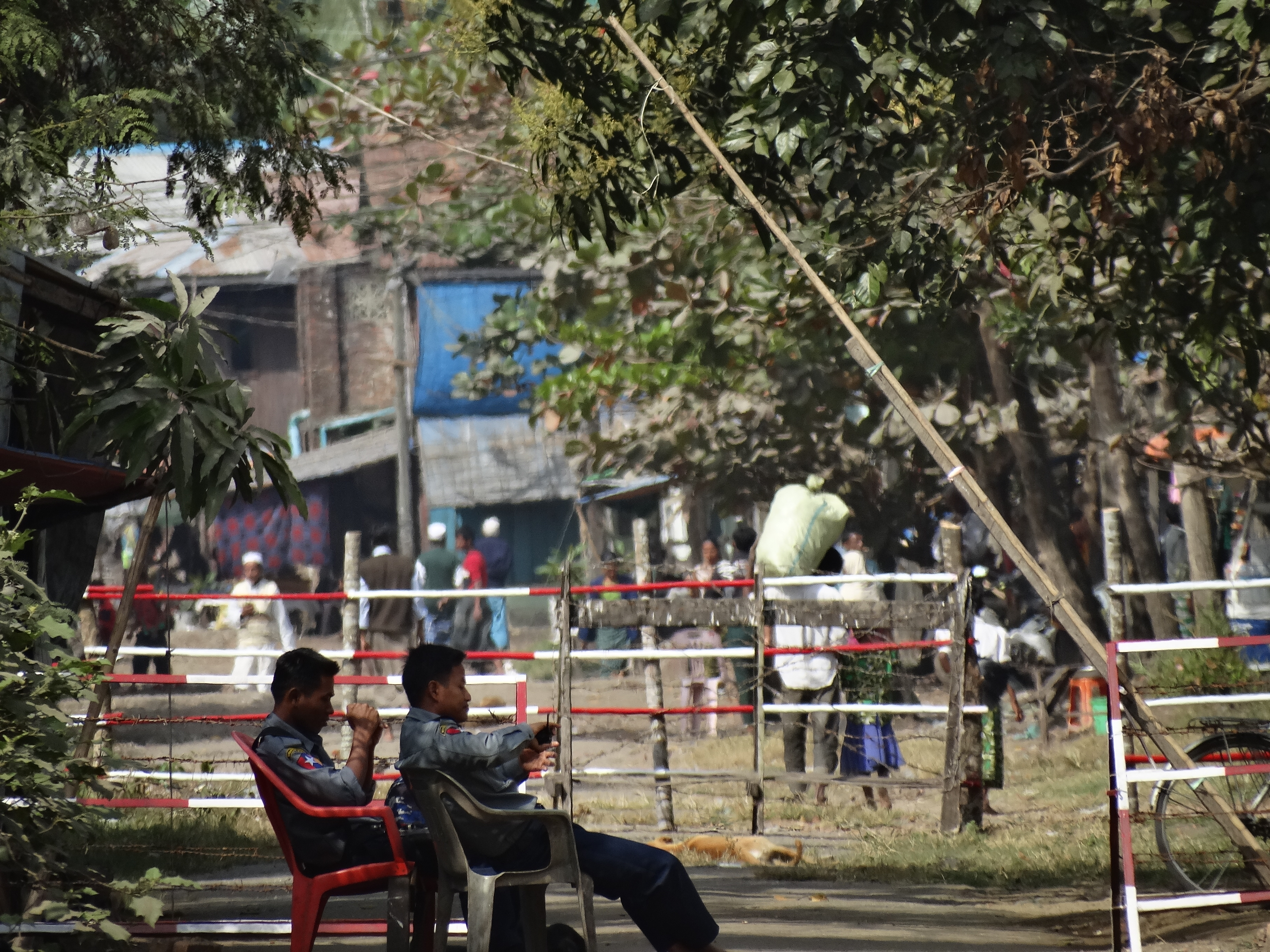
Police checkpoint next to Aung Mingalar in Sittwe

The area of modern Sittwe was the location of a battle during the conquest of the Kingdom of Mrauk U (later Arakan and now Rakhine State, Myanmar) by the Burmese king Bodawpaya. In 1784, a Burmese expeditionary force said to be 30,000 strong encountered the governor of U-rit-taung Province, General ("Saite-ké") Aung and his force of 3000. Although heavily outnumbered, the Arakanese force tried to fight the Burmese forces on both land and sea, but were brutally crushed. This defeat opened the route towards the inland Arakanese capital of Mrauk-U, which was soon conquered, ending the independence of the Arakanese. According to Arakanese lore, all of the Arakanese defenders were killed.

Sittwe was only a small fishing village at the time of the British conquest of Burma, but its four poorly maintained stupas Akyattaw, Thingyittawdhāt, Letyatalundaw, and Letwetalundaw were later claimed to date to the 16th century and to hold various relics of the Buddha: part of his rear jawbone, his thigh, his right shinbone, and his left shinbone respectively.

The local defenses were stormed by the British under Gen. Morrison in 1825 during the First Anglo-Burmese War. Despite Morrison and many of his men succumbing to malaria, cholera, and other tropical diseases to the point the entire settlement was abandoned for a time, the port was chosen to serve as Arakan's seat of government in 1826 largely because Mrauk U was considered even more unhealthy. It was renamed Akyab after the town's hill and its eponymous pagoda. The bell of the pagoda at the Mahamuni Buddha Temple south of Mandalay was removed to the basement of the Akyab courthouse until 1867.

Sittwe was developed highly into a formal town beginning with Mi Zan Ward under the guidance of British colonial officials alongside Arakanese leaders. Under British occupation, the town grew into an important maritime base, particularly for the export of the area's rice. Despite its bad reputation for disease, historical records indicate Akyab was no more dangerous to its European colonizers than other locations along the India coast. Its population increased to 15,536 inhabitants c. 1865, 33,200 c. 1880, and 31,687 by 1901, when it was the third largest port city in British Burma. In the 1860s, the Consulate General of the United States (Kolkata) had a consular agency in Akyab. The four stupas along the ridge overlooking the town were rebuilt in the late 19th century very plainly and unattractively.

During World War II, Sittwe was an important site of many battles during the Burma Campaign due to its possession of both an airfield and a deepwater port.

On August 13, 1967, in Sittwe, security forces under General Ne Win's regime fired upon civilians in a protest demanding rice, killing over 300 protesters.

Sittwe is the birthplace of political monks in Myanmar. It was the birthplace of U Ottama, the first monk who protested against the colonial British in Myanmar. Also, in the recent 2007 protest marches, known as the Saffron Revolution, it was the monks in Sittwe who started the protest against the military government in Myanmar. Sittwe houses the Dhanyawadi Naval Base, named after the ancient Rakhine city-state of Dhanyawadi.

Since 2012, the Myanmar government has held tens of thousands of Rohingyas in camps at Sittwe. There are now some 140,000 Rohingyas living in poor condition huts with limited electricity and food. Rohingya refugees can not go out or move around and also not allowed to work outside of camp. The beach at Ohn Daw Gyi became the main departure point.

In early 2024, as a result of the Myanmar Civil War, Sittwe was surrounded by Arakan Army forces, which gained control of most of Rakhine State. Sittwe and a number of other cities are the only remaining areas in the state still controlled by the ruling military junta. A mass population exodus has been reported, with the only remaining avenue of escape being the airport. As of December 2024, Sittwe remains only one of three major towns in Rakhine state under junta control, along with Kyaukphyu and Manaung. In early March 2026, the Arakan Army started to advance around Sittwe.

== Climate ==
Sittwe's climate is classified as a tropical monsoon climate (Am), according to the Köppen climate classification system. The city experiences a dry season from December through April, and an extraordinarily rainy wet season covering the remaining seven months. Sittwe sees average rainfall in excess of 1 metre (40 in) per month during June, July and August. Conditions are noticeably cooler and less humid in the months of December, January and February than during the remainder of the year.

Climate data for Sittwe (1991–2020)
Month	Jan	Feb	Mar	Apr	May	Jun	Jul	Aug	Sep	Oct	Nov	Dec	Year
Record high °C (°F)	37.0 (98.6)	39.5 (103.1)	40.0 (104.0)	38.0 (100.4)	38.9 (102.0)	37.2 (99.0)	37.7 (99.9)	38.0 (100.4)	38.0 (100.4)	39.5 (103.1)	35.0 (95.0)	34.0 (93.2)	40.0 (104.0)
Mean daily maximum °C (°F)	28.4 (83.1)	30.1 (86.2)	31.9 (89.4)	33.2 (91.8)	32.7 (90.9)	30.3 (86.5)	29.5 (85.1)	29.6 (85.3)	30.6 (87.1)	31.6 (88.9)	31.0 (87.8)	29.1 (84.4)	30.7 (87.2)
Daily mean °C (°F)	21.4 (70.5)	23.0 (73.4)	25.8 (78.4)	28.4 (83.1)	28.7 (83.7)	27.4 (81.3)	26.8 (80.2)	26.8 (80.2)	27.2 (81.0)	27.5 (81.5)	25.7 (78.3)	22.9 (73.2)	26.0 (78.7)
Mean daily minimum °C (°F)	14.4 (57.9)	16.0 (60.8)	19.8 (67.6)	23.5 (74.3)	24.8 (76.6)	24.5 (76.1)	24.1 (75.4)	24.0 (75.2)	23.8 (74.8)	23.4 (74.1)	20.4 (68.7)	16.6 (61.9)	21.3 (70.3)
Record low °C (°F)	6.0 (42.8)	7.5 (45.5)	10.0 (50.0)	15.5 (59.9)	18.8 (65.8)	18.0 (64.4)	19.0 (66.2)	18.0 (64.4)	18.5 (65.3)	16.8 (62.2)	11.0 (51.8)	8.0 (46.4)	6.0 (42.8)
Average precipitation mm (inches)	9.7 (0.38)	10.3 (0.41)	8.2 (0.32)	27.2 (1.07)	330.2 (13.00)	1,129.4 (44.46)	1,334.4 (52.54)	937.5 (36.91)	563.1 (22.17)	303.0 (11.93)	84.9 (3.34)	12.5 (0.49)	4,750.4 (187.02)
Average precipitation days (≥ 1.0 mm)	0.5	0.5	0.7	2.0	12.4	24.4	28.1	27.2	20.8	11.3	3.3	1.1	132.3
Average relative humidity (%)	74	69	70	72	74	89	92	92	88	84	80	79	80
Source 1: World Meteorological Organization
Source 2: Meteo Climat (record highs and lows), Deutscher Wetterdienst (humidity 1951-1967)

== Demographics ==
The largest ethnic group in Sittwe is the Rakhine people. Alongside, there are Rohingya Muslims and some Burmese from other parts of the country.

As of 2019, the General Administration Department reported 170,355 "Bangladeshi foreigners" living in Sittwe' metro area- Sittwe Township and only 144,773 Rakhine residents in the township. Accordingly, 53.4% of the overall township adheres to Islam. There are no comparable statistics for just the city of Sittwe as the township's population nearly doubled between 2018 and 2019.

The vast majority practises Theravada Buddhism and Islam. The Rohingya Muslim quarter used to be called Aung Mingala, until the Muslims were driven out by mobs during riots in October 2012.

== Economy ==
Sittwe is politically and militarily the most important and developed city in Rakhine state. It additionally hosts international investments such as the Kaladan project. In February 2007, India announced a plan to develop the port under the Kaladan Multi-Modal Transit Transport Project, which would enable ocean access from Indian north-eastern states, so called "Seven sisters", like Mizoram, via the Kaladan River. The project envisions three transport links: an ocean link between Sittwe and Kolkata, a river link from Sittwe to Paletwa, and a road from Paletwa to Zorinpui in Mizoram. The ocean shipping route began in 2023. As of 2026, the road link remains incomplete due to weather, flooding and the Myanmar Civil War.

Sittwe serves as a gateway for goods from Bangladesh and supports trade with townships across Arakan. Local livelihoods are based on agriculture, fishing, shrimp farming, trade, and other activities. The city also hosts rice mills, fish and shrimp trading centers, ice plants, salt production facilities, and garment-related works. Seafood and agricultural exports are transported through Shwe Min Gan Port to Bangladesh and also distributed through multiple routes to central Myanmar. Sittwe also has local banks such as Kanbawza Bank (KBZ), Yoma Bank, Innwa Bank, Myanmar Economic Bank and other financial buildings.

== Attractions ==
- Point is a viewpoint at the southernmost tip of Sittwe and the most well-known attraction in the city. It is situated where the Kaladan River flows into the Bay of Bengal.
- The hundred-year old Shwezedi Monastery is a famous monastery in Sittwe. It was the monastery of U Ottama, who was the first political monk in Myanmar.
- Sittwe Pharagri, the focal point of Sittwe's Buddhist environment, beside Shwezedi Monastery.
- Ahkyaib-daw, is one of the most sacred Buddhist pagodas, possibly originating from the 3rd century BCE in the days of Emperor Asoka. The pagoda Ahkyaib-daw, meaning maxillary bone, is believed to be built on a foundation encasing a piece of Buddha’s maxillary bone.
- Rakhine State Cultural Museum, which contains exhibits on Rakhine culture and history.
- Lawkananda Pagoda, Sittwe, which is the largest Buddhist temples in Sittwe.
- Lay Shan Taung Lighthouse, colonial era lighthouse which was built in 1844

== Education ==
- Computer University, Sittwe
- Sittwe University
- Technological University, Sittwe

== Sport ==
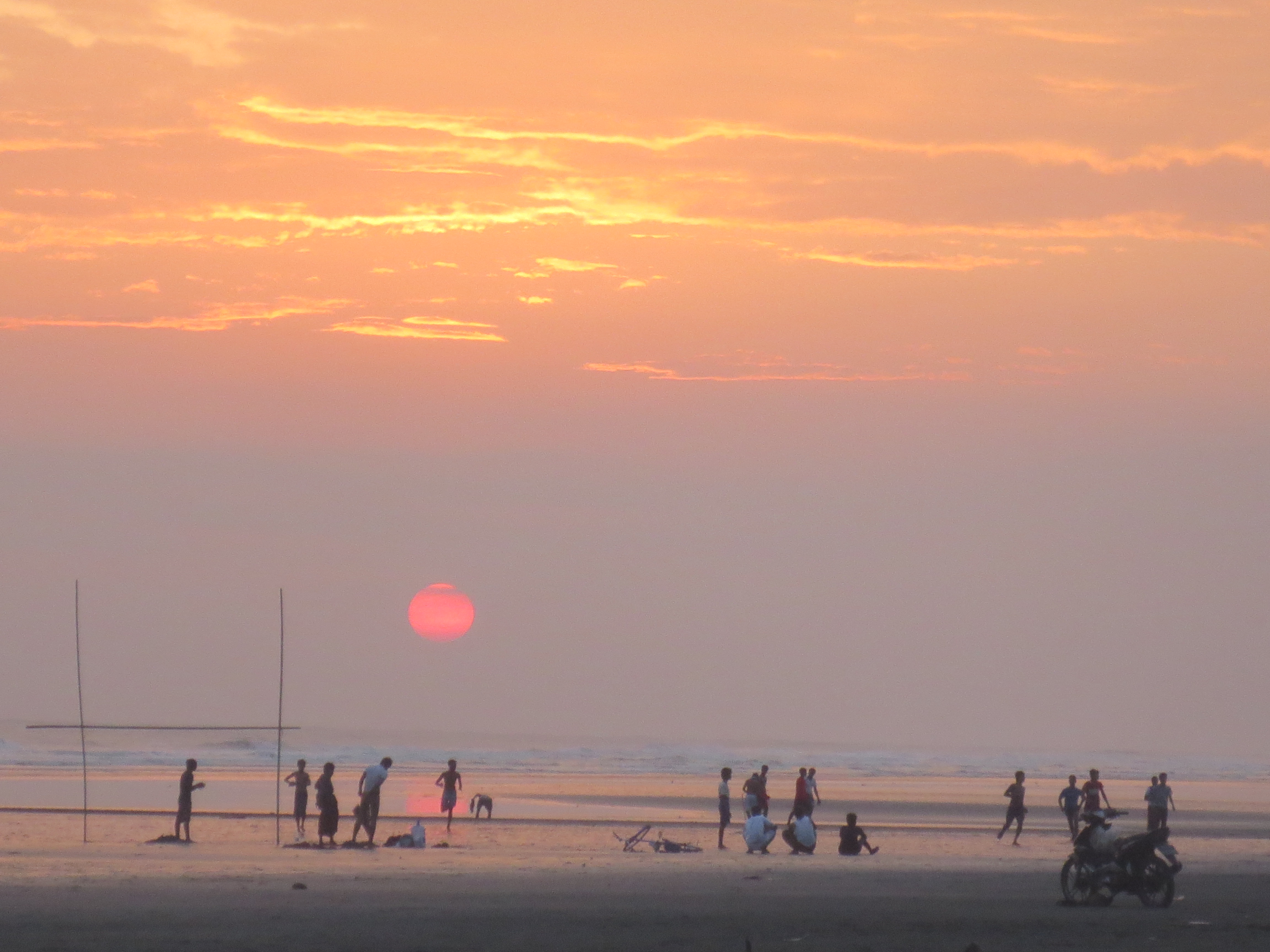
Boys playing soccer on Sittwe Beach

The 7,000-seat Wai Thar Li Stadium is the home ground of Rakhine United F.C., a Myanmar National League (MNL) football club. Dhanyawaddy Stadium, also with 7,000 capacity, is the current home ground of Arakan United FC of the Myanmar Amateur League.

== Notable people ==
- Kyaw Hla Aung, civil rights activist
- Shwe Zan Aung, scholar, translator and civil servant
- Twan Mrat Naing, commander in chief of the Arakan Army
- Aye Nyunt (aka Zura Begum), female politician and MP
- Kyaw Soe Oo, investigation journalist
- Saki (Hector Hugh Munro), writer and playwright, born in Sittwe in 1870

== Image gallery ==
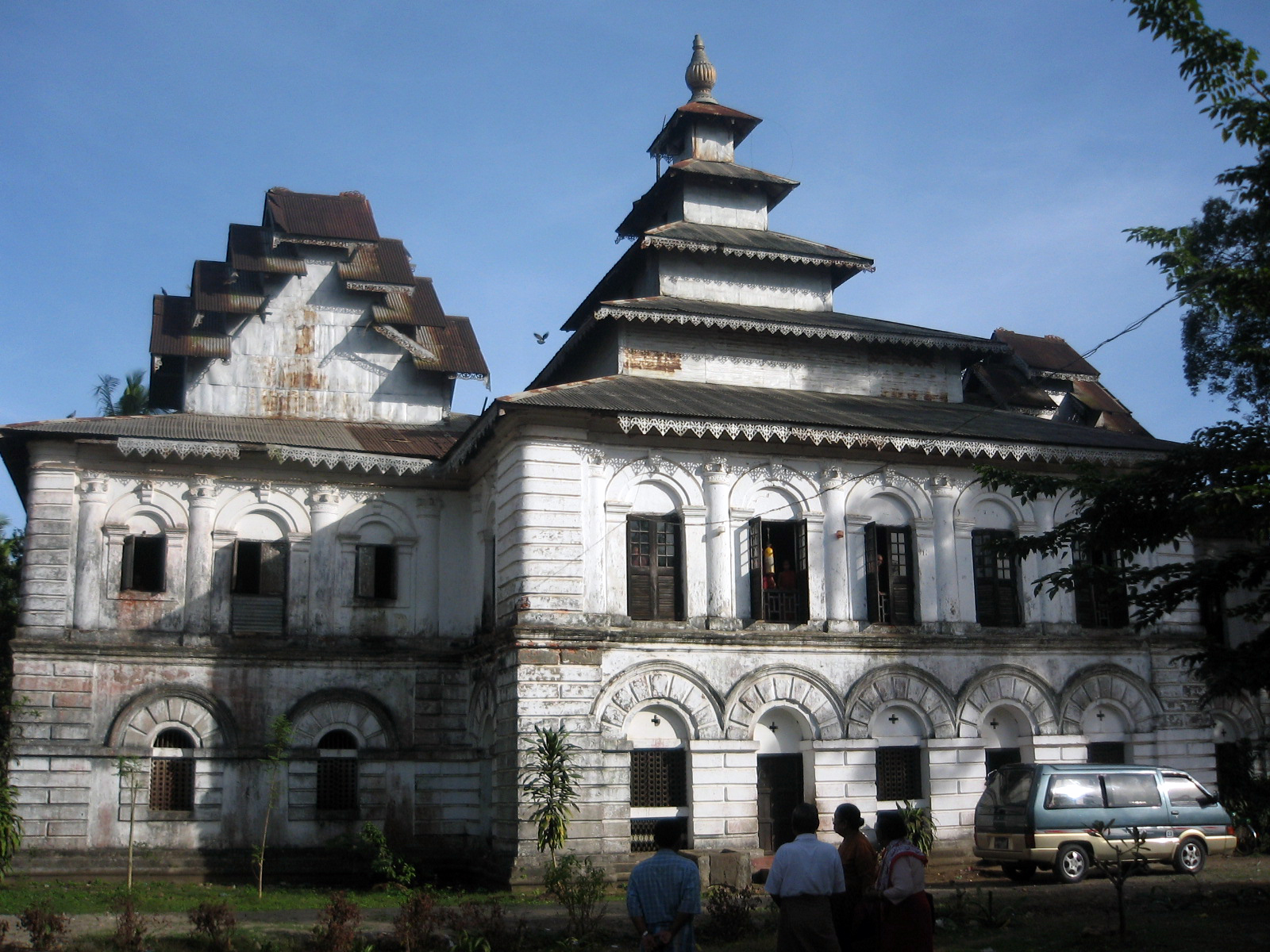
Shwezedi Monastery

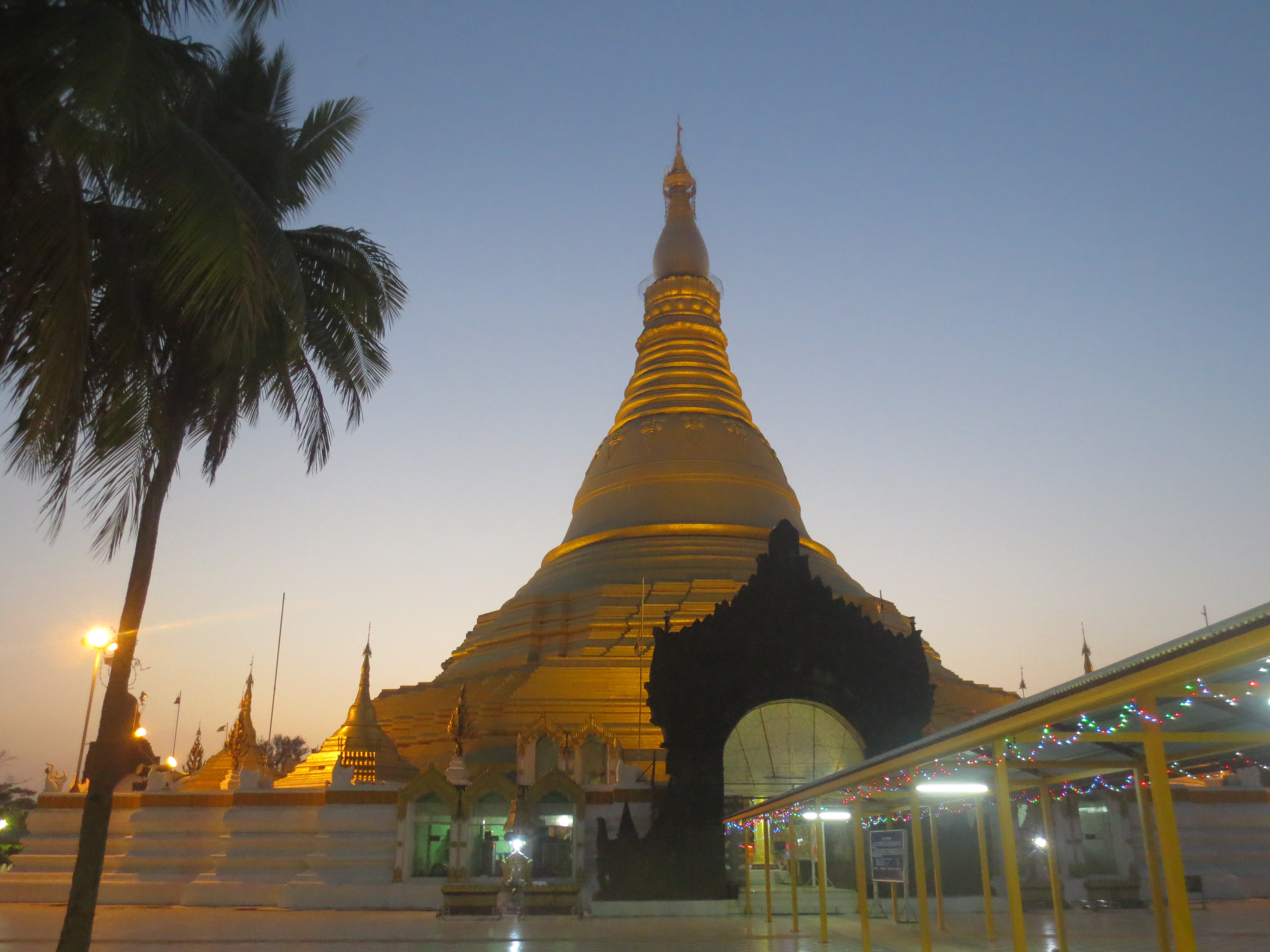
Lawkananda Pagoda, Sittwe

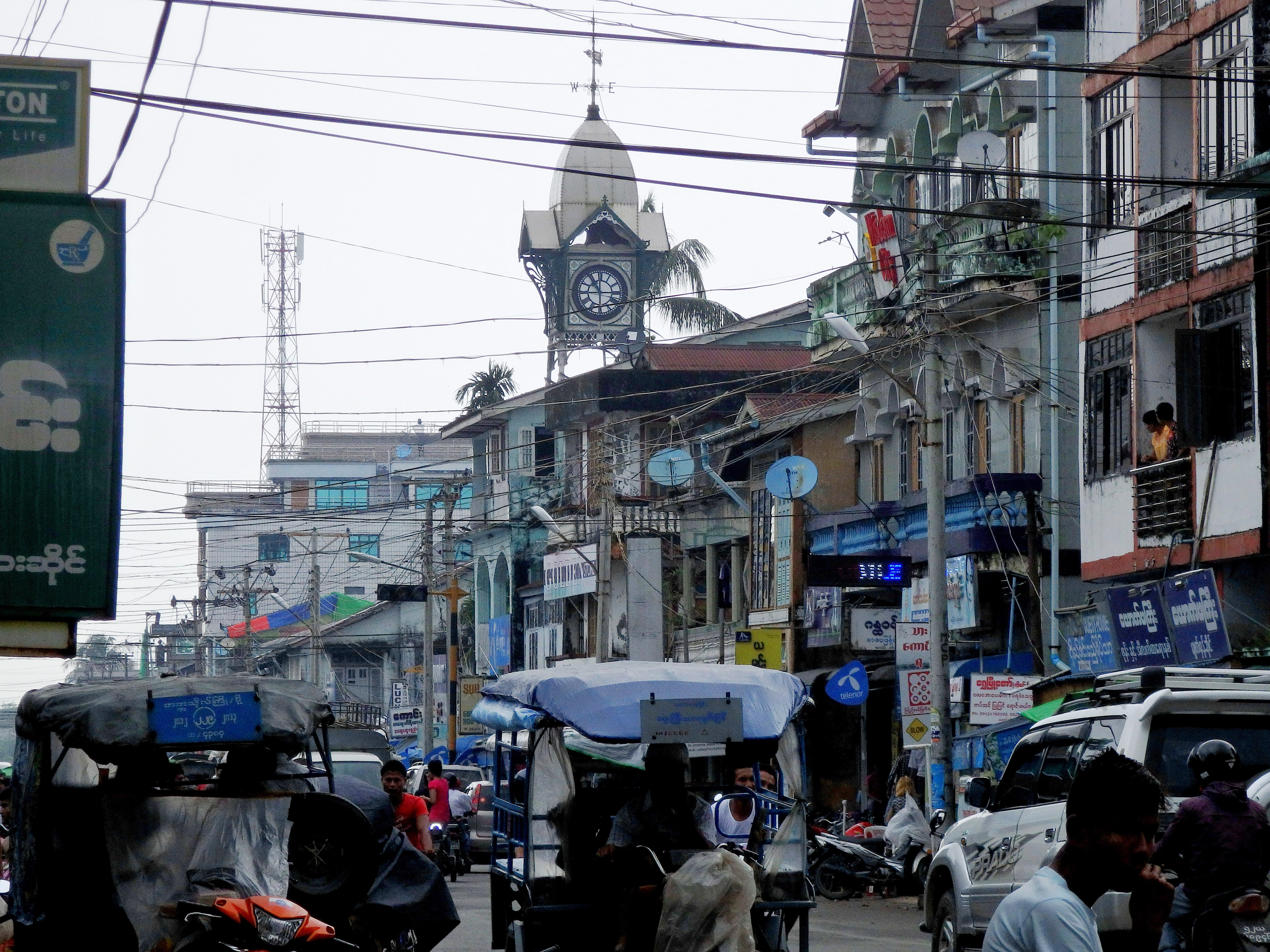
The main street

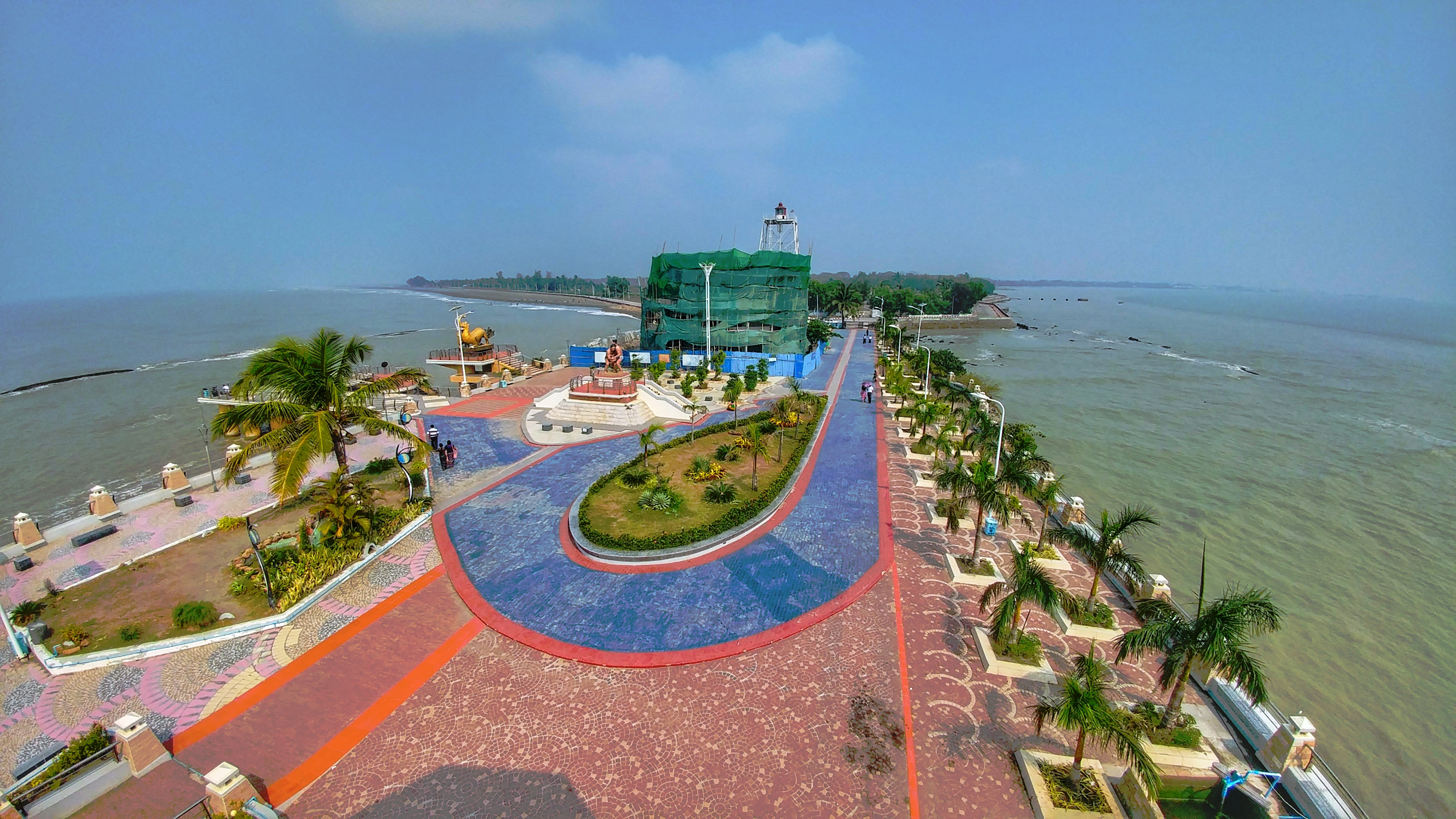
Sittwe View Point Park

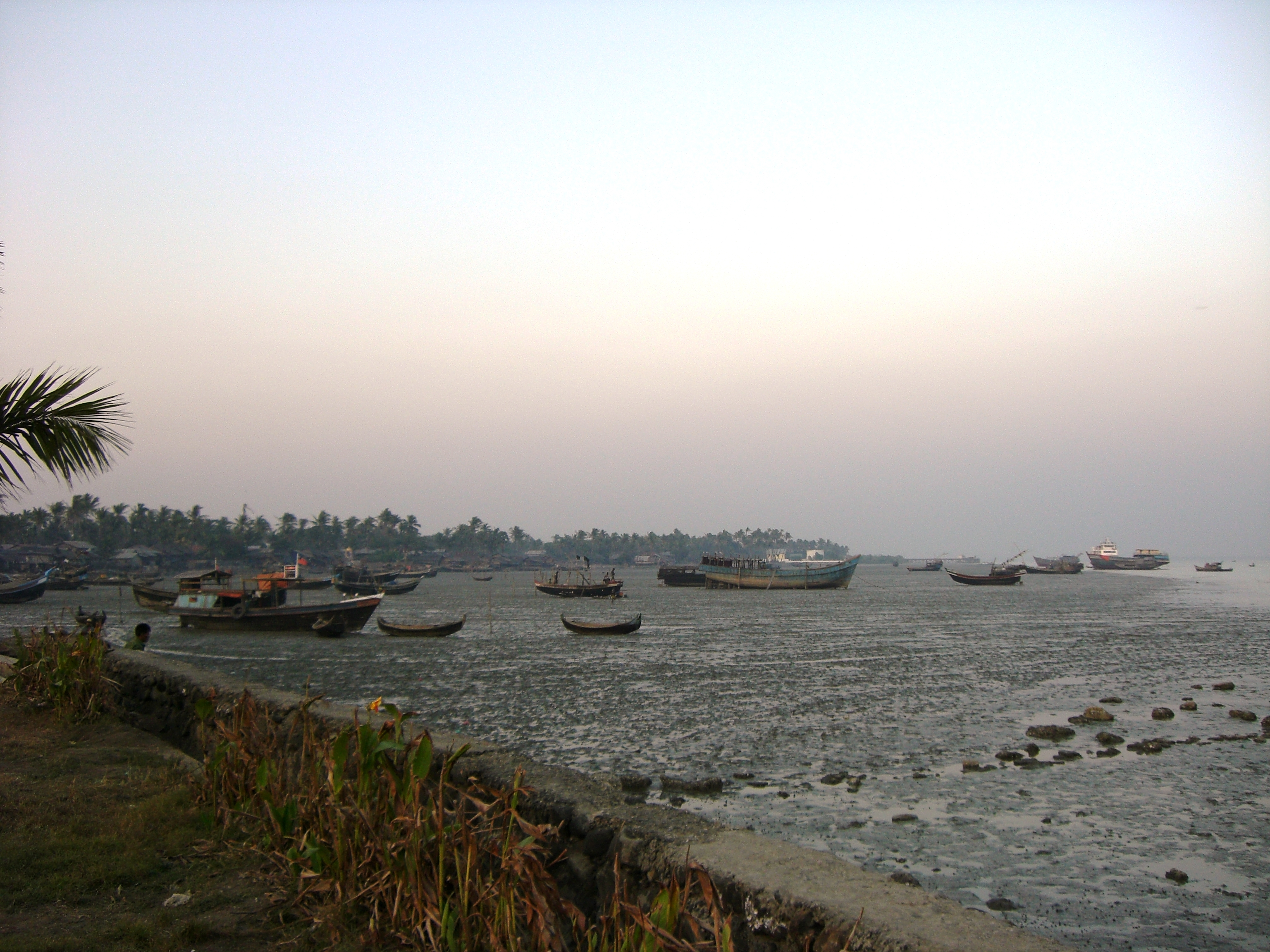
Foreshore

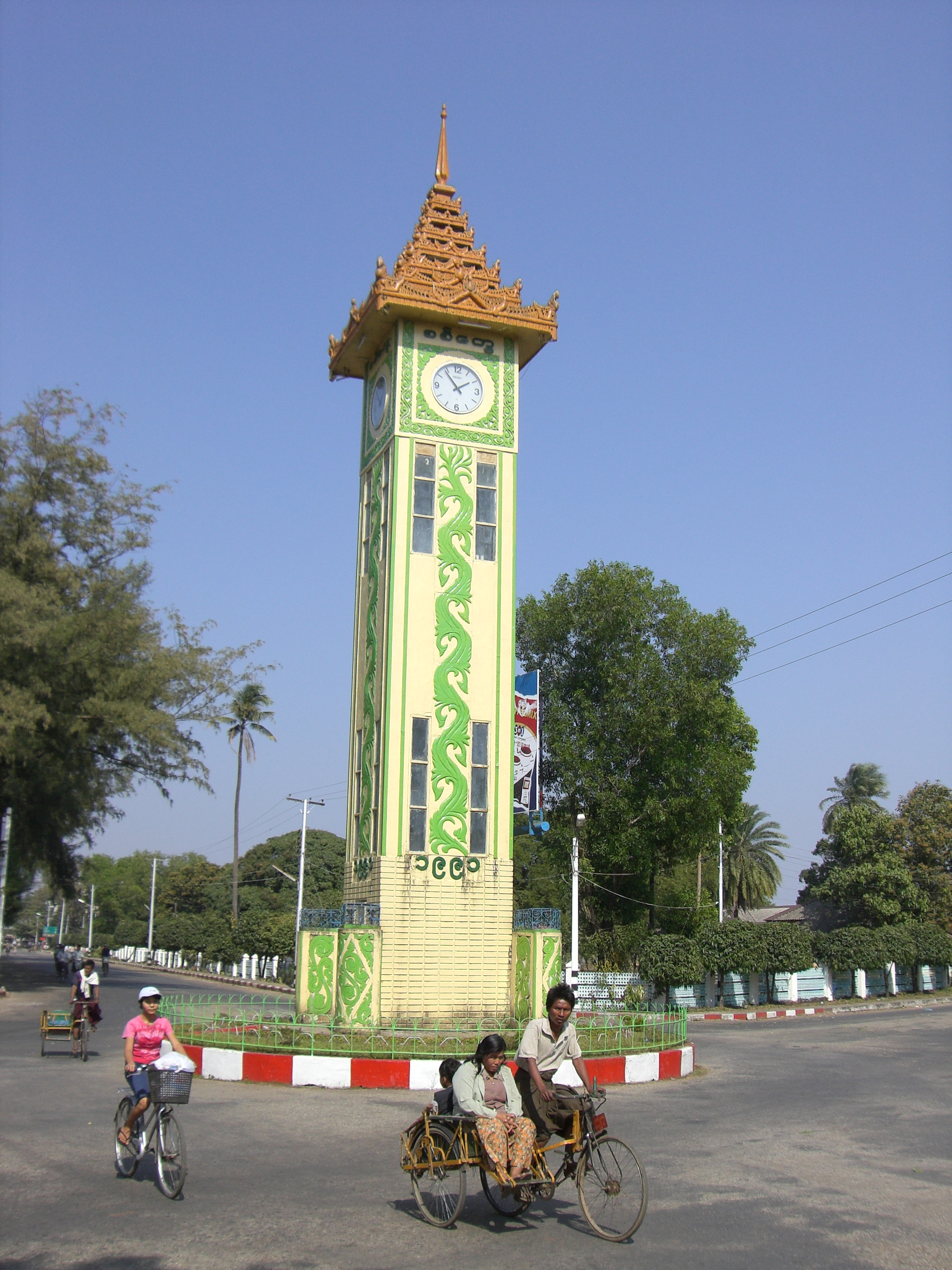
New clock tower

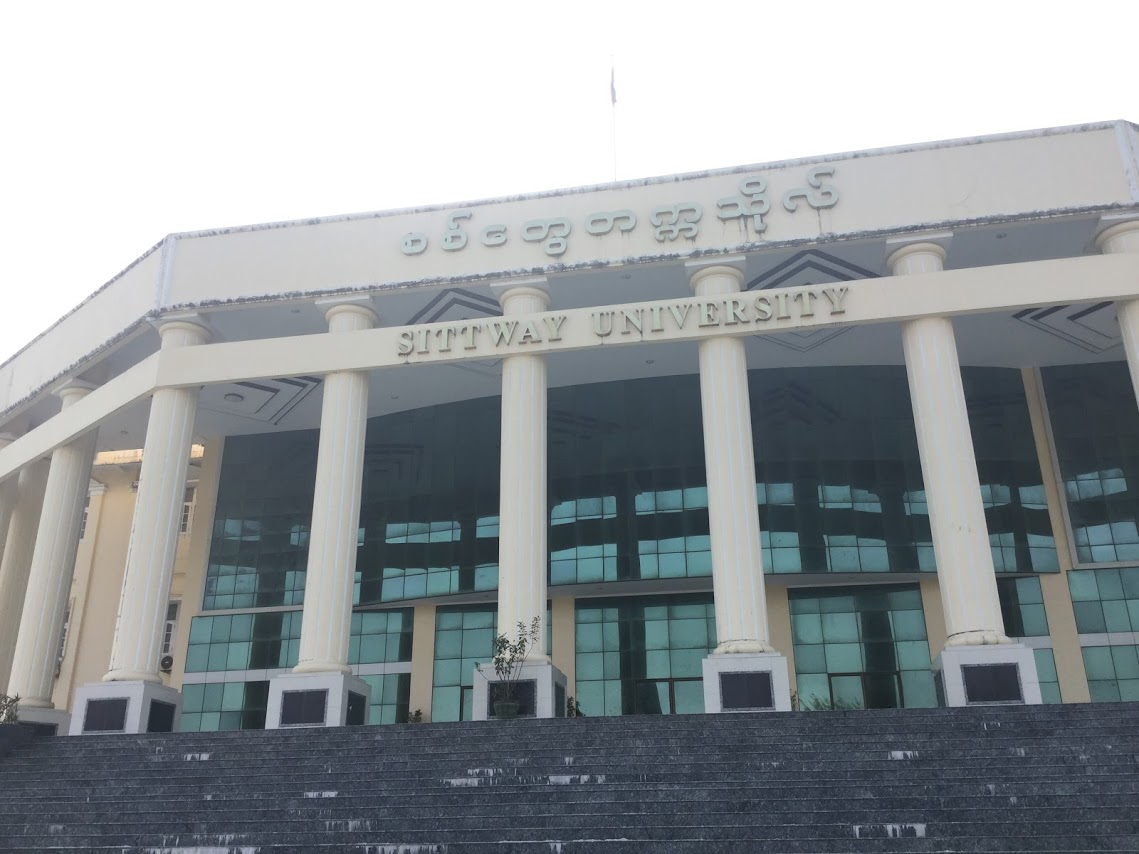
Sittwe University

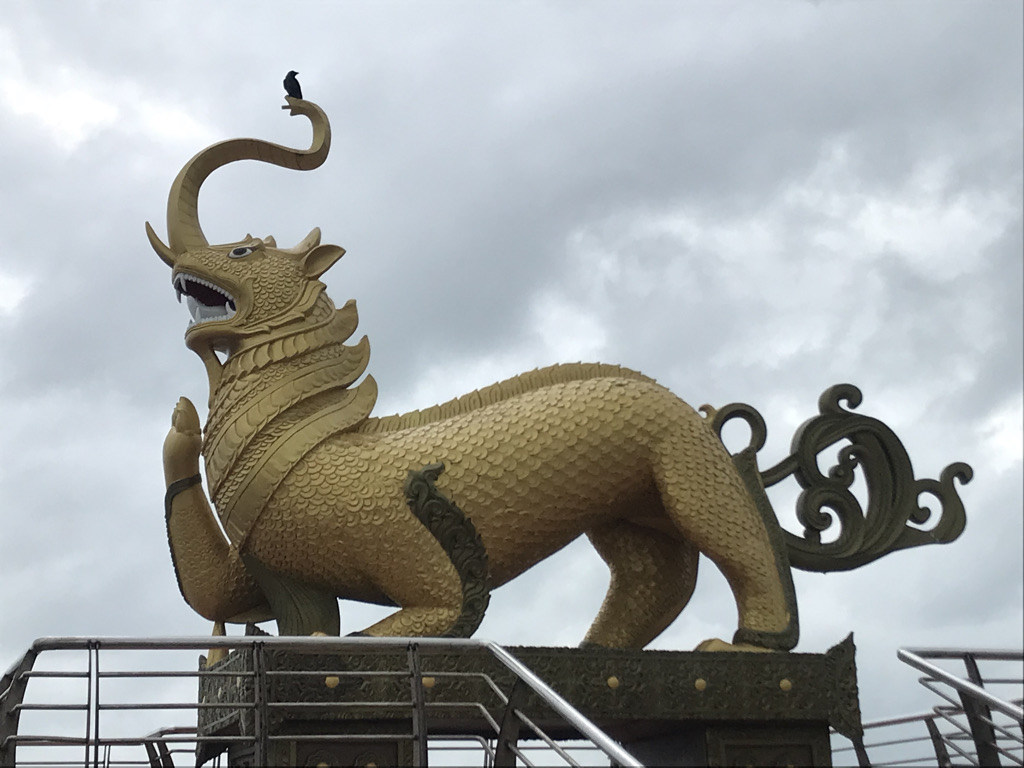
Bya La statue (Nawarupa) in Sittwe

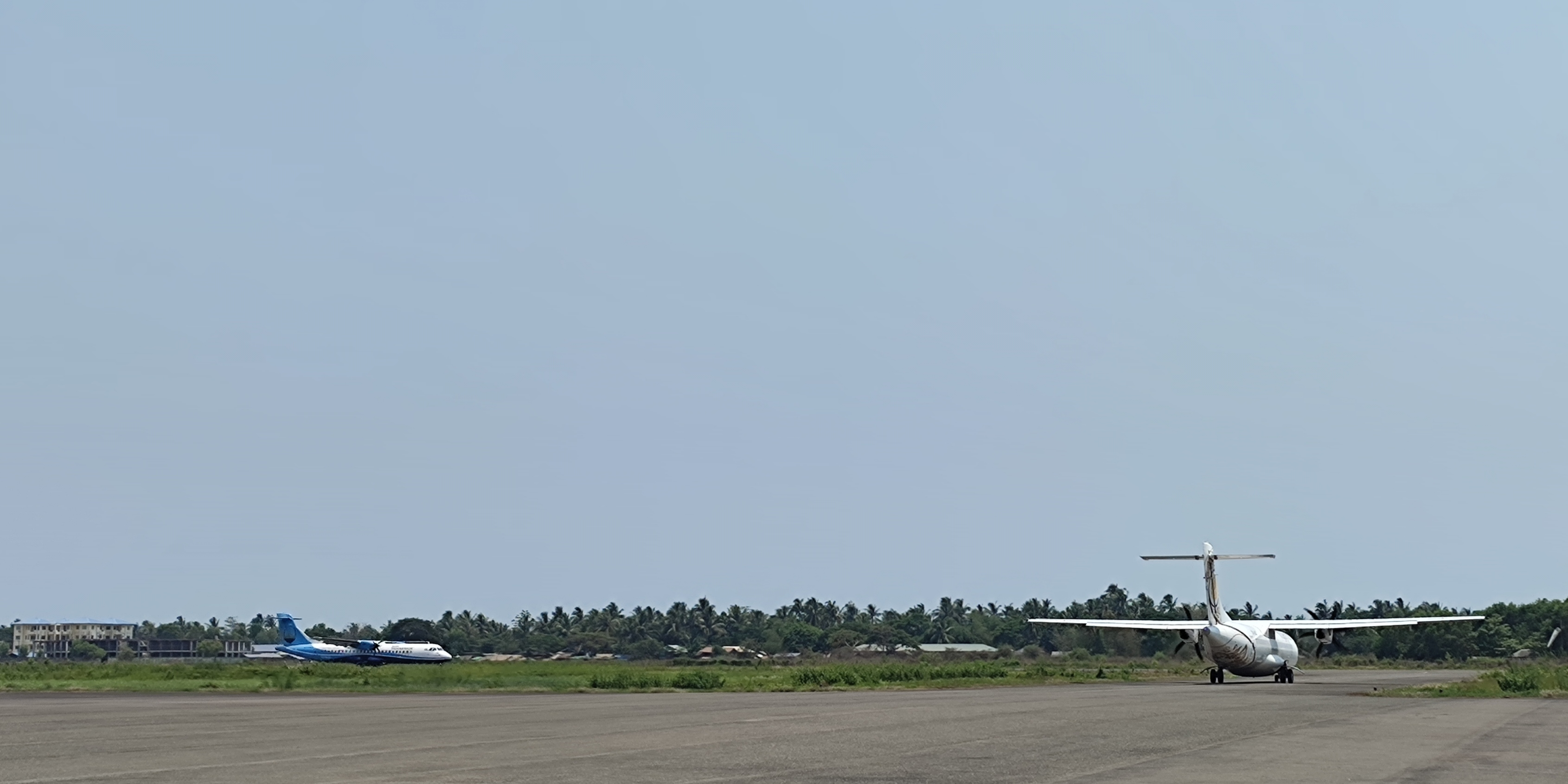
Sittwe Airport

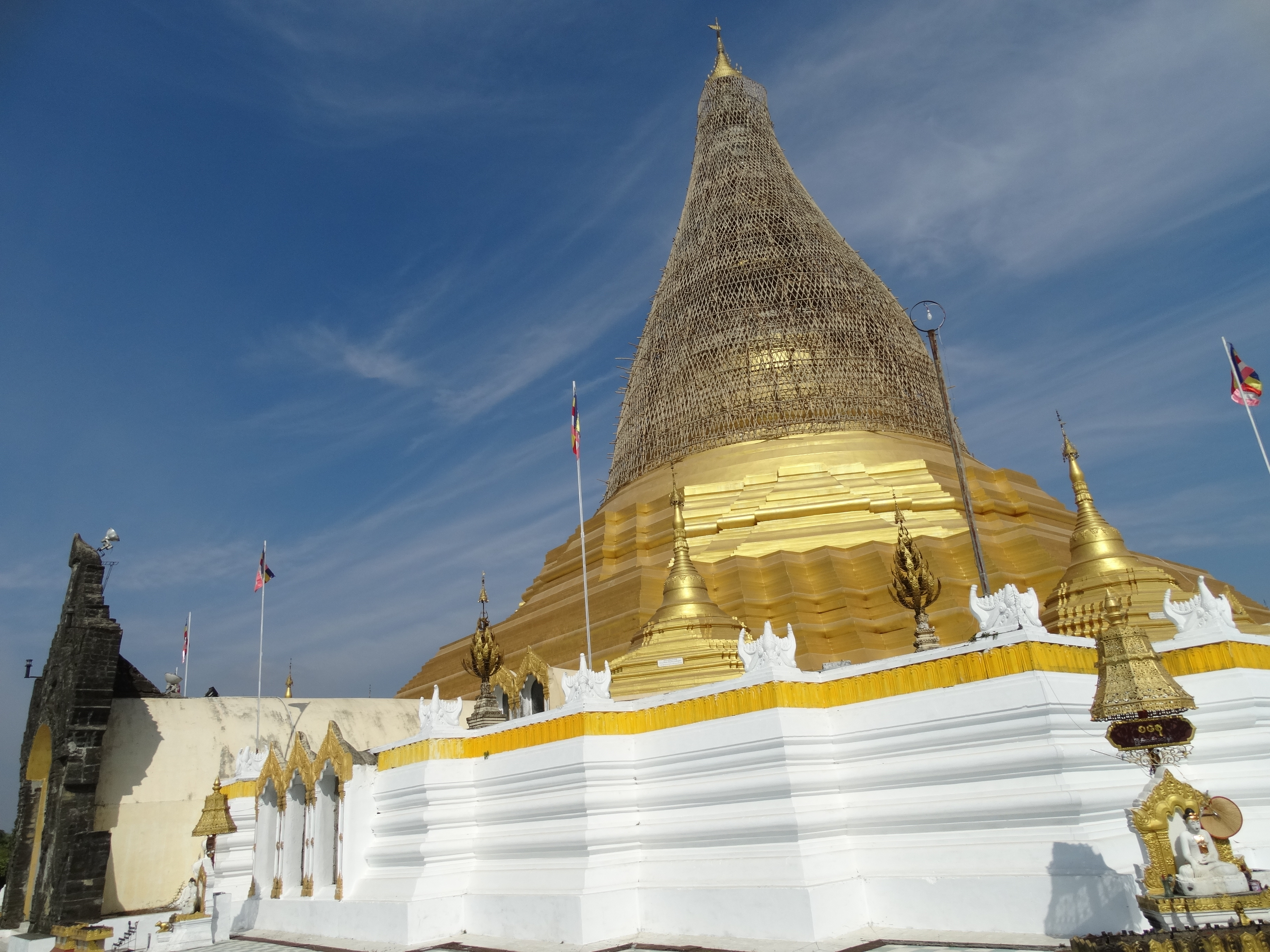
View of Lokananda Paya

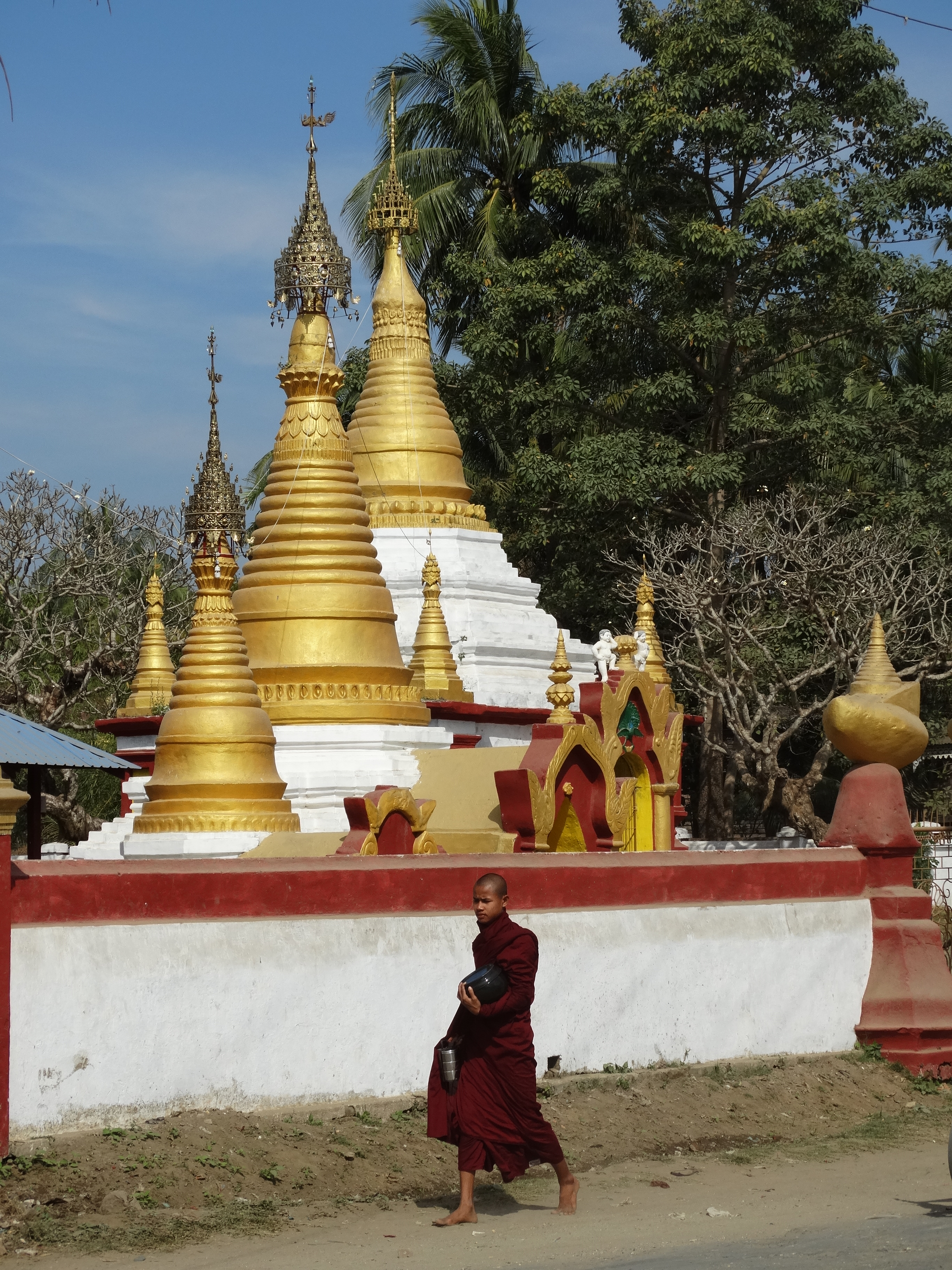
A monk passes through a pagoda

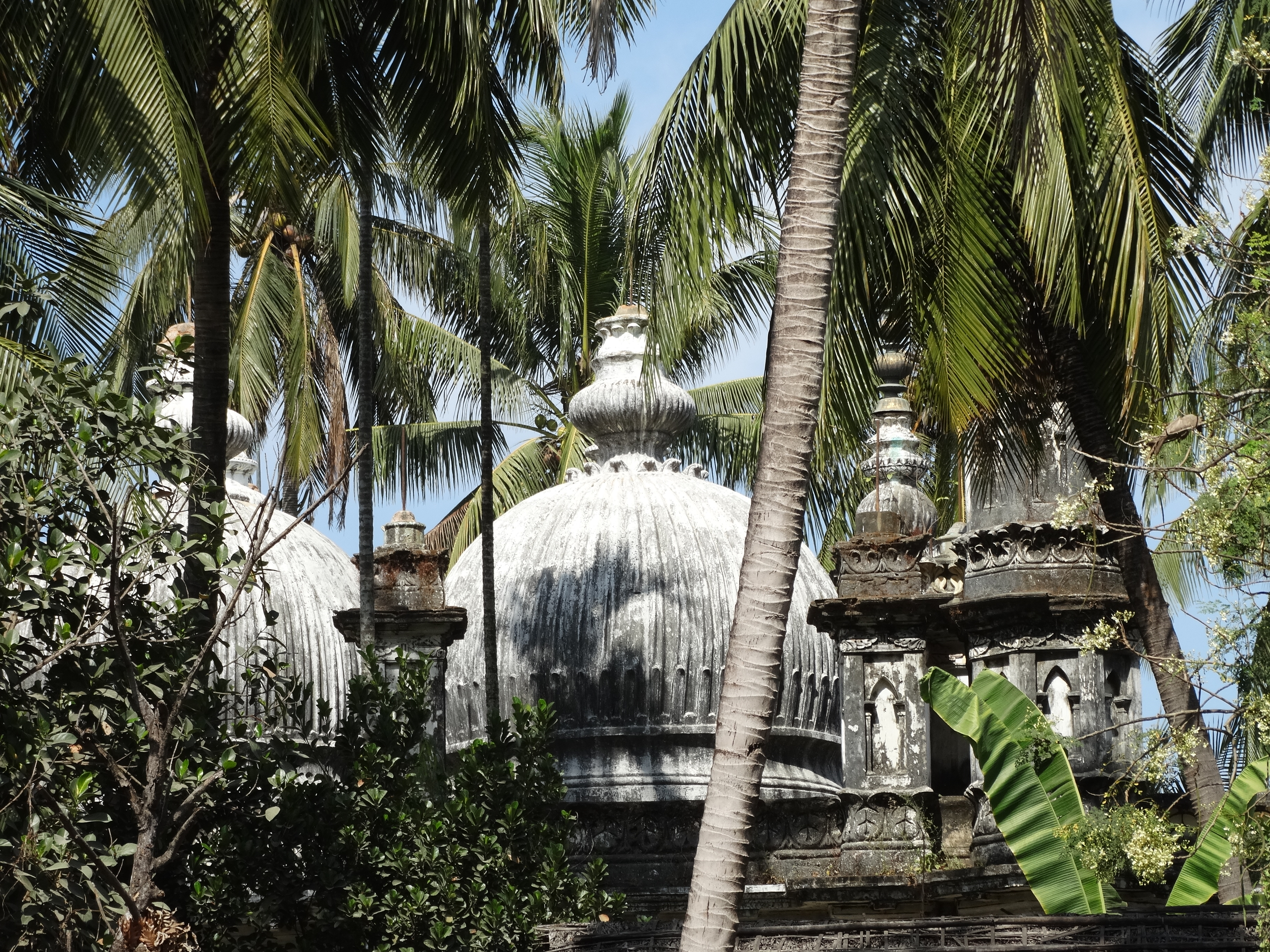
Sittwe Jama Mosque

== See also ==
- Point, Sittwe
- Sittwe Airport

Sittwe
Preceded by None	Capital of British Arakan; 24 February 1826 – 31 January 1862	Succeeded by Yangon
