= Shwezedi Monastery =

Buddhist monastery in Sittwe, Myanmar

- ရွှေစေတီကျောင်း
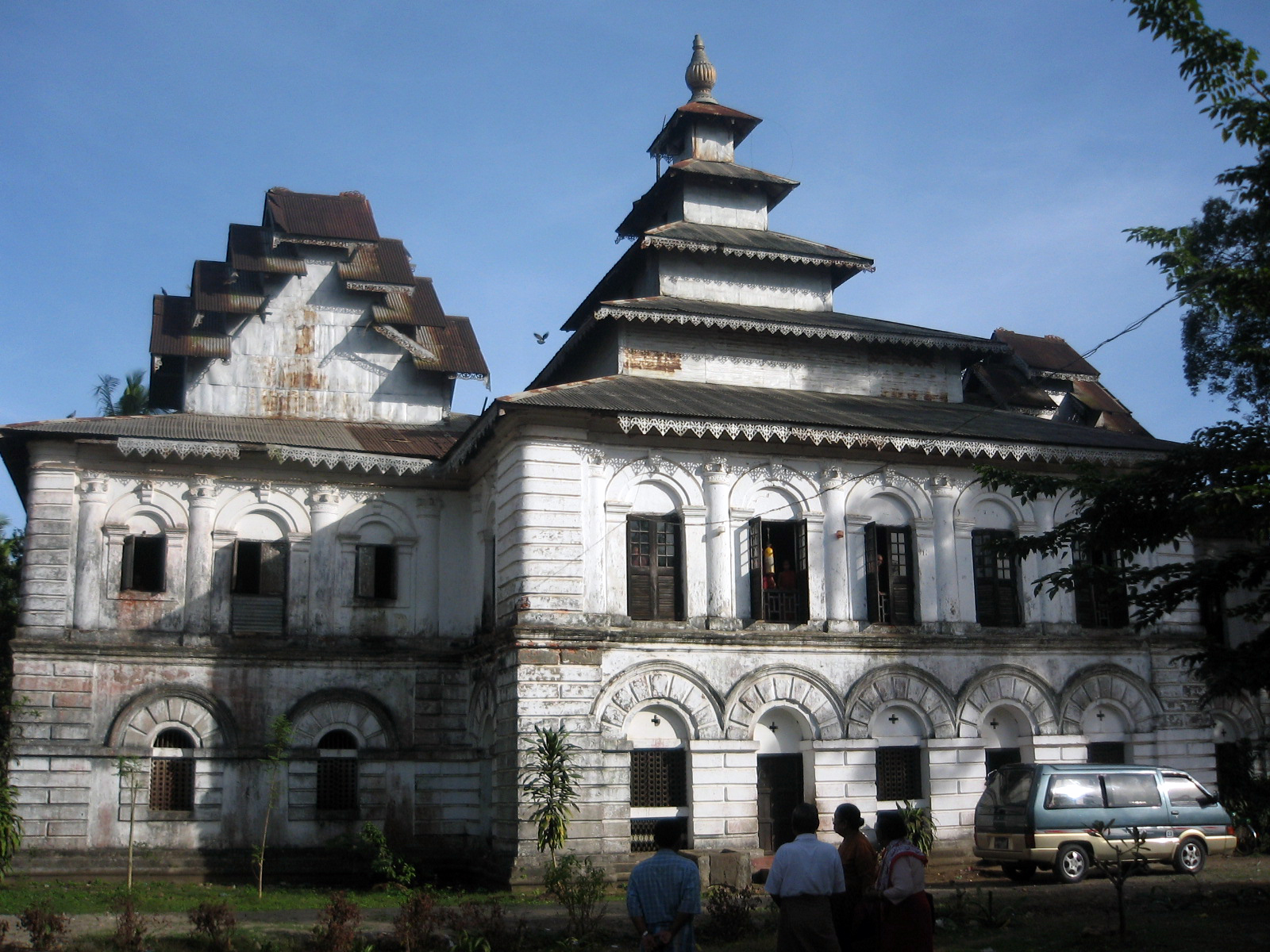
- Shwe Zedi Kyaung

- Location within Burma

Religion
- Affiliation: Theravada Buddhism

Location
- Country: Sittwe, Rakhine State, Myanmar
- Coordinates: 20°08′47.19″N 92°53′40.31″E

Architecture
- Founder: U Ottama
- Completed: 1903; 123 years ago

The Shwezedi Monastery (Burmese: ရွှေစေတီကျောင်း [ʃwè zèdì tɕáʊɰ̃]; lit. 'Golden Pagoda Monastery') is a famous Theravada Buddhist monastery in Sittwe, Rakhine State, Myanmar. Founded in 1903, the monastery is one of the main Buddhist monasteries in the city.

== Importance ==
Venerable U Ottama was a resident of the monastery during the 1920s and 1930s. He was the first political monk in the then British Burma, helping to establish a key factor in modern Burmese politics - that of political monks. He is considered one of the national heroes of Burmese independence movement.

The monastery is seen as a focal point of Burmese and Arakanese politics and the birthplace of political Buddhism in Myanmar. The monastery now runs a gratis school and an Arakanese cultural school to help the local residents.

The monastery has been visited by Indian prime ministers Jawaharlal Nehru and Indira Gandhi, and in 2002 by Aung San Suu Kyi.
