= Rice Killing Day =

1967 Killing of protestors in Rakhine State

1967 Sittwe rice killing day
- Date: 13 August 1967
- Location: Sittwe, Rakhine State, Myanmar
- Caused by: Due to food shortages in Rakhine state
- Result: Army crackdown and shooting at protestors

Parties
Rakhine protesters	Government of Burma: Burma Socialist Programme Party; Myanmar Armed Forces

Lead figures
No centralized figure	Ne Win

Casualties
- Deaths: 24 (government claim); 200-300 (claimed by eyewitnesses)
- Injuries: 100+

On 13 August 1967, an incident occurred in Sittwe, Rakhine State, where Ne Win's military regime fired on Arakanese protestors, killing over 300 Arakanese people. The protest erupted due to severe food shortages caused by government hoarding and forced rice exports, despite local starvation.

The day is annually commemorated by the Rakhine community on August 13 to remember the brutality of the military dictatorship.

== Names ==
The event is referred to as multiple names including "Rice Killing Day", "Rice Crisis Day" and "Rice Massacre".

== Event ==
The event occurred during the rule of General Ne Win and the Burma Socialist Programme Party (BSPP). Earlier that year, a cyclone in May significantly reduced rice production which lead to widespread food shortages. At the same time, government policies prioritized rice exports to other parts of the country and domestic supply was limited. As a result, many people in Arakan faced serious difficulties obtaining food, regardless of their ability to pay. Some turned to alternative foods such as taro root and roselle, while others experienced severe hunger.

In Sittwe, these conditions led to public unrest. On August 13, residents organized a protest, which was met with a military response. The military regime's security forces opened fire on the crowd, causing multiple casualties.

== Casualties ==
The government's statement said the death toll to be at 24, but eyewitness claimed that more than 300 people died. Around 100 people were also injured.

== Legacy ==
The anniversary is held by Rakhine diaspora in several places including in Bangladesh, India, Thailand, Malaysia, Japan and USA.
