= Point, Sittwe =

Park in Sittwe, Myanmar

Viewpoint
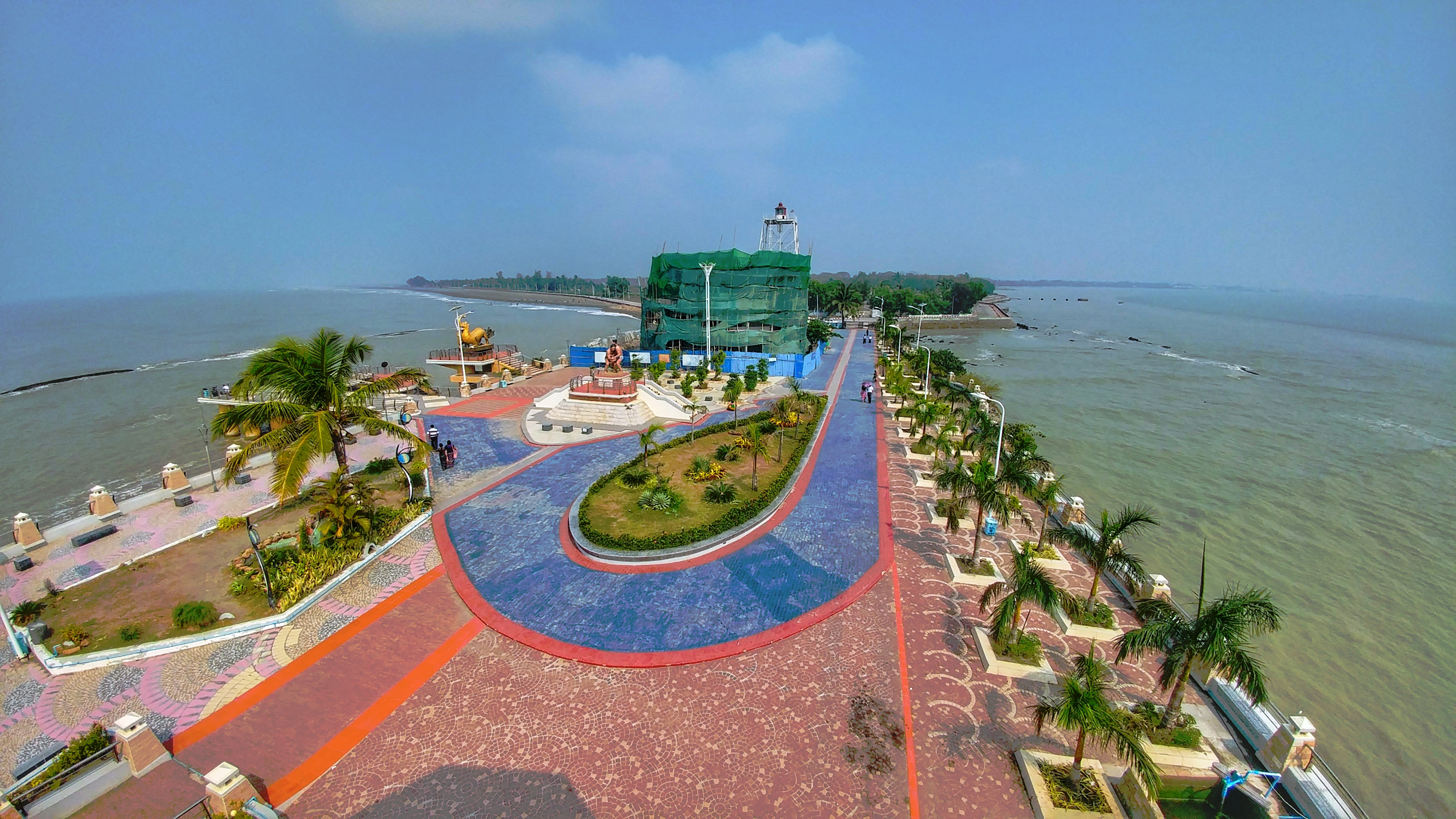
- Interactive map of Viewpoint
- Type: Urban park
- Location: Shukhin Tha Kanar Road, East Sanpya Quarter
- Nearest city: Sittwe
- Coordinates: 20°06′47.14″N 92°53′52.83″E
- Status: Open all year

Viewpoint, popularly known as Point, is the principal attraction in Sittwe, the capital of Rakhine State, Myanmar. It is an urban park which serves mainly as a viewing deck into the Indian Ocean and the nearby scenery.

== Location ==
It is the southernmost tip of the city and looks out onto where the Bay of Bengal and the mouth of the Kaladan River meet. It is built on a rock jutting out into the Indian Ocean, with the ocean to the west and the river on the east. The Point consists of the main deck, an old look-out tower, a modern lighthouse, a few statues of Rakhine cultural aspects, including a Rakhine mythical creature, Byala (known as Nawa Rupa in Burmese), and a scene of two wrestlers competing in Kyin wrestling, the traditional wrestling of the Rakhine people, and part of the Sittwe Beach. The two main roads of Sittwe, the Old Strand and the New Strand Roads, converge at the entrance to Point.

The Dhanyawadi Naval Base of the Myanmar Navy forms the northern border of Point.

== Attractions ==
The merging of the Kaladan River and the Bay of Bengal can be seen from Point. The Phayonekar or Baronga Islands and the western approaches of the Arakan Yoma are also visible. It also provides an excellent view of both Sittwe beach and Sittwe harbour, and both the sunrise and sunset.

An old cannon is still mounted, although its base has been cemented into a single block. The cannon points towards the Indian Ocean.

Point is a favourite hangout for young couples and other locals.
