= U Ottama =

Buddhist monk and leader of the Burmese independence movement

Sayadaw U U Ottama
- ဆရာတော် ဦးဥတ္တမ
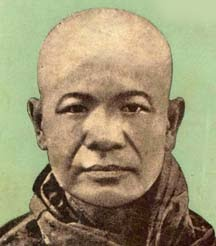
- Title: Saradaw

Personal life
- Born: Paw Tun Aung; 28 December 1879; 1st waning of Pyatho 1241 ME Rupa Village, Sittwe District, Arakan Division, Burma, British India
- Died: 9 September 1939 (aged 59); 11th waning of Wagaung 1301 ME Yangon, Pegu Division, British Burma
- Occupation: Buddhist monk

Religious life
- Religion: Buddhism
- School: Theravada
- Dharma name: 𑀉𑀢𑁆𑀢𑀫; Uttama

Senior posting
- Based in: Shwezedi Monastery, Sittwe

Sayadaw U Ottama (Burmese: ဆရာတော် ဦးဥတ္တမ [sʰəjàdɔ̀ ʔú ʔoʊʔdəma̰]; Pali: 𑀉𑀢𑁆𑀢𑀫, Uttama; 28 December 1879 – 9 September 1939) was a Theravada Buddhist monk, author, and a leader of the Burmese independence movement during British colonial rule. The ethnic Rakhine (Arakanese) monk was imprisoned several times by the British colonial government for his anti-colonialist political activities.

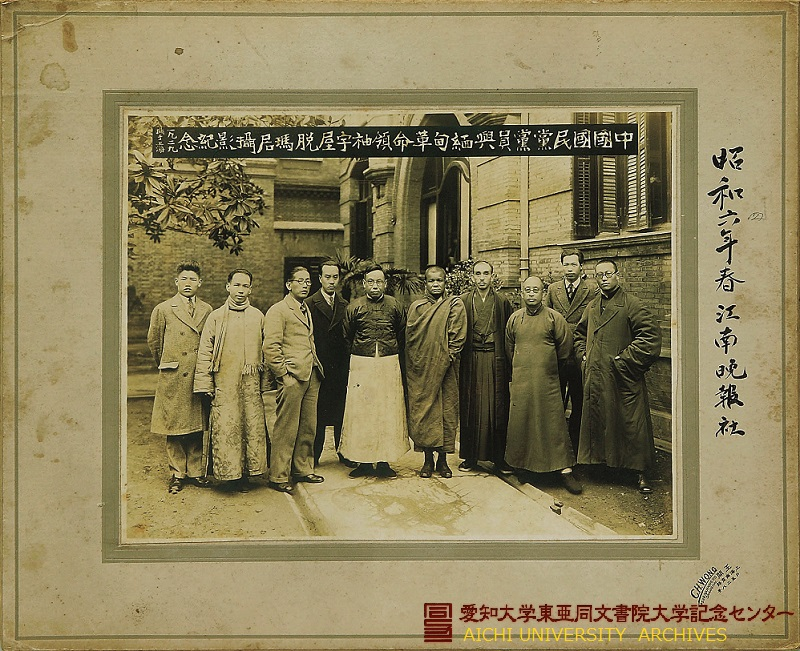
Group photo featuring U Ottama with members of the Chinese Nationalist Party. U Ottama is the fifth person from the right.

== Biography ==
=== Early life ===
He was born Paw Tun Aung, son of U Mra and Daw Aung Kwa Pyu, in Rupa, Sittwe District, in western Burma on 28 December 1879. Paw Tun Aung assumed the religious name Ottama when he entered the Buddhist monkhood.

=== Education ===
Ashin Ottama studied in Calcutta for three years. He then travelled around India, and to France and Egypt.

In January 1907, he went to Japan, where he taught Pali and Sanskrit at the Academy of Buddhist Science in Tokyo. He then travelled to Korea, Manchuria, Port Arthur, China, Annam, Cambodia, Thailand, Sri Lanka, and India. In Saigon, he met with an exiled former Burmese prince, Myin Kun (who led a rebellion along with Prince Myin Khondaing in 1866 and assassinated the heir to the Burmese Crown, Crown Prince Kanaung).

== Anti-colonial and political activities ==
Upon his return to British Burma, U Ottama started his political activities, toured the country, lecturing for the Young Men's Buddhist Association and giving anti-colonial speeches. In 1921, he was arrested for his infamous "Craddock, Get Out!" speech against the Craddock Scheme by Sir Reginald Craddock, then Governor of British Burma. Repeatedly imprisoned on charges of sedition, he carried on. Ottama was one of the first monks to enter the political arena and the first person in British Burma to be imprisoned as a result of making a political speech, followed by a long line of nationalists such as Aung San and U Nu.

Inspired by Gandhian principles, U Ottama advocated nonviolent resistance, promoting peaceful protests, boycotts of British goods, and a revival of indigenous values and self-reliance. He framed his opposition to colonial rule through Buddhist ethics, creating a compelling message that strongly resonated with the Burmese people. According to academics; between 1921 and 1927, U Ottama spent more time in prison than outside.

While Ashin Ottama did not hold any post in any organization, he encouraged and participated in many peaceful demonstrations and strikes against British rule. An admirer of Mahatma Gandhi, he did not advocate the use of violence.

He represented the Indian National Congress at the funeral of Dr. Sun Yat-Sen in June 1929. The only time he held a post was as leader of the All India Hindu Mahasabhas in 1935.

== Demise ==
U Ottama died in Rangoon Hospital on 9 September 1939.

== Legacy ==
U Ottama's legacy remains significant in modern Myanmar. His contributions are commemorated through annual events in Sittwe and Yangon. His former monastery, Shwe Zedi in Sittwe remains as a historically relevant associated with political and social activism.

Annually, his death-recorded on 9 September 1939 is commemorated by various groups in Myanmar and abroad. These commemorations are often referred to as "U Ottama Day" is served to honor his memory and to remind contemporary generations of the long struggle against colonial oppression. His anniversary is widely observed across Rakhine State including Kyaukphyu, Taungup and other townships. It is also celebrated abroad by the Rakhine people in Thailand, Malaysia and Japan.

== Notes ==
- Ba Yin (2007). Sayadaw U Ottama: Sower of Seed of Independence Movement (in Burmese). Yangon.
